= Culture of Poland =

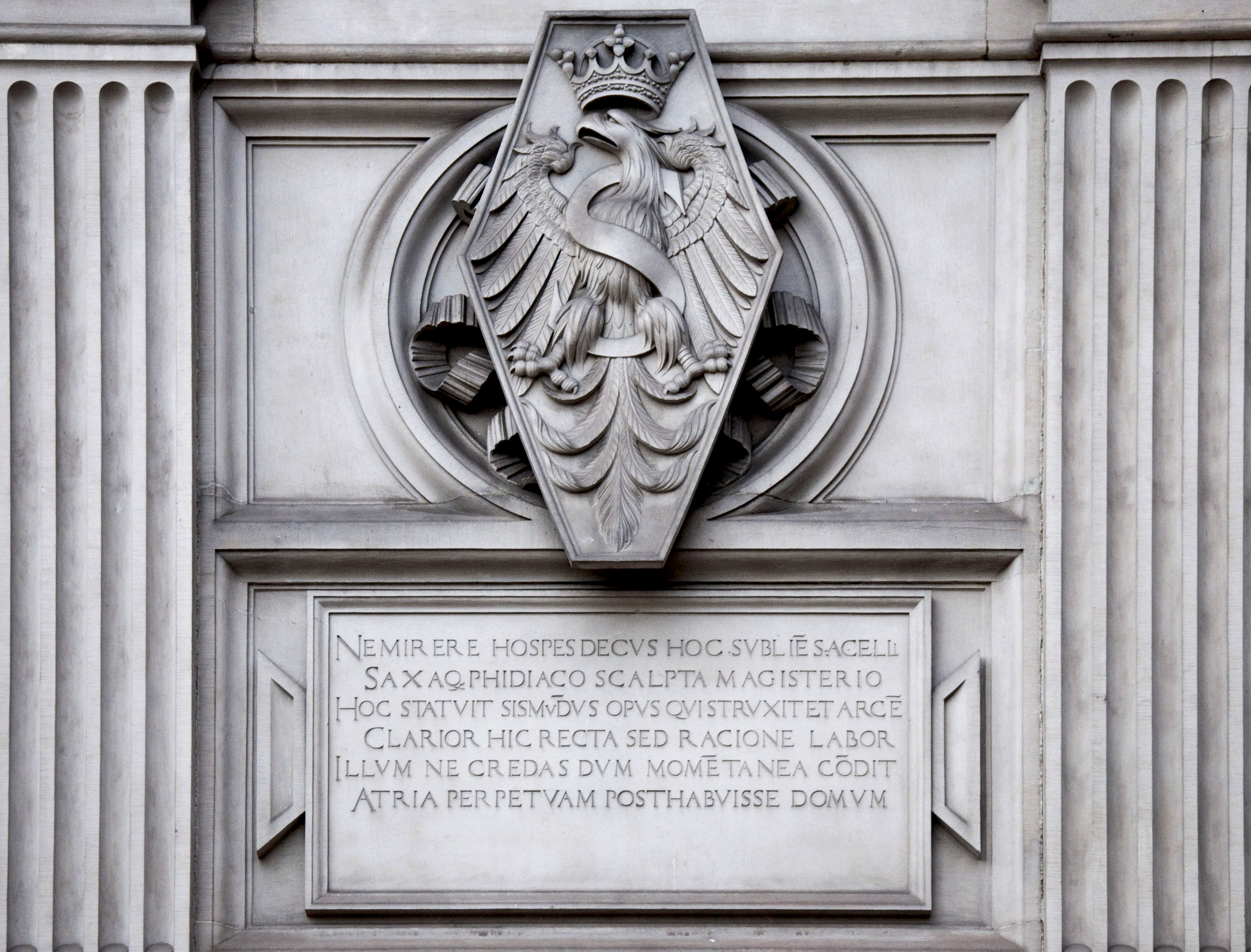
The Polish White Eagle is Poland's enduring national and cultural symbol.

The culture of Poland (Polish: Kultura Polski or kultura polska) is the product of its geography and distinct historical evolution, which is closely connected to an intricate thousand-year history. According to the 2021 census, 71.3% of Poland's population declared affiliation with the Roman Catholic Church. The unique character of Polish culture developed as a result of its geography at the confluence of various European regions.

Ethnic Poles are generally understood to have developed from West Slavic populations in the region, alongside the assimilation of earlier and neighboring groups, including Celts, Balts, and Germanic tribes. The adoption of Latin Christianity by Mieszko I in 966 initiated the Christianisation of the Piast state and its gradual integration into the cultural sphere of Western Europe. The culture of the Polish lands subsequently developed through both local traditions and exchanges with neighbouring societies and broader European artistic and intellectual movements, reflecting the region's historical ethnic and religious diversity.

The people of Poland have traditionally been seen as hospitable to artists from abroad and eager to follow cultural and artistic trends popular in other countries. In the 19th and 20th centuries, the Polish focus on cultural advancement often took precedence over political and economic activity. These factors have contributed to the versatile nature of Polish art, with all its complex nuances.

== History ==
Cultural history of Poland can be traced back to the Middle Ages. In its entirety, it can be divided into the following historical, philosophical artistic periods: Culture of medieval Poland (from the late 10th to late 15th century), Renaissance (late 15th to the late 16th century), Baroque (late 16th to the mid-18th century), Enlightenment (second half of the 18th century), Romanticism (from around 1820 until the suppression of the 1863 January uprising against the Russian Empire), Positivism (lasting until the turn of the 20th century), Young Poland (between 1890 and 1918), Interbellum (1918–1939), World War II (1939–1945), People's Republic of Poland (until the 1989 Autumn of Nations), and Modern.

== Language ==
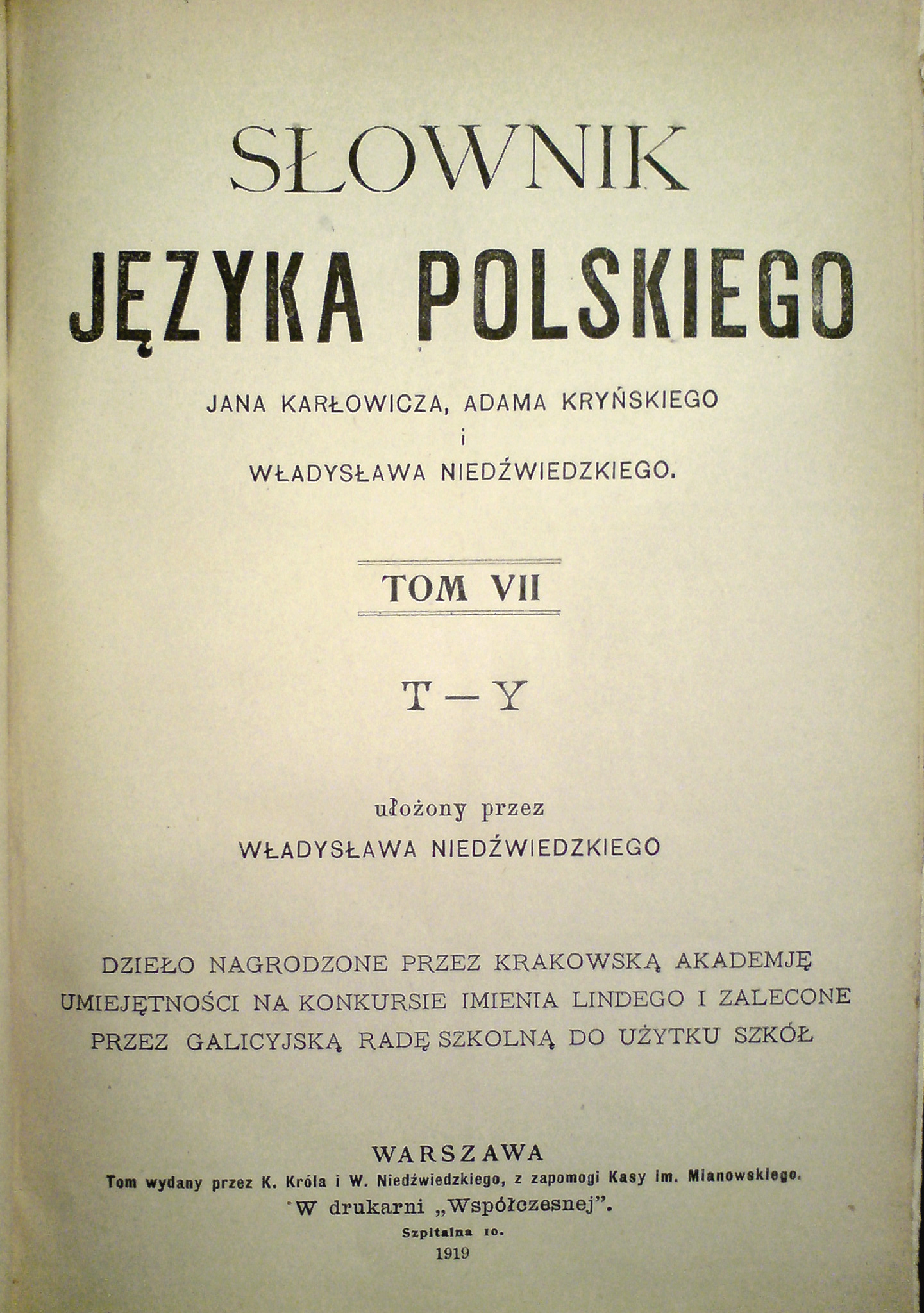
The first Polish language dictionary published in the Second Polish Republic, 1919

Polish (język polski, polszczyzna) is a West Slavic language belonging to the Lechitic subgroup of the Indo-European language family. Related Lechitic varieties include Kashubian and the extinct Polabian; Slovincian is generally classified as an extinct variety of Kashubian. The status of Silesian as a separate language or a dialect of Polish remains disputed. Polish is the official language of Poland and is also spoken by Polish communities abroad. It is written using the Polish alphabet, which is based on the Latin script and includes additional letters with diacritics. According to the 2021 census, 99.6% of Poland's residents reported using Polish at home, while 95.3% reported using it as their only home language.

== Cuisine ==
Polish foods include kiełbasa, pierogi (filled with meat, potatoes, cabbage, cheese or holiday fruits), pyzy (meat-filled dough balls), kopytka, gołąbki (meat and rice stuffed cabbage), śledzie (herring), bigos, schabowy, oscypek and much more. Traditionally, food such as soups flaki, rosół, zupa ogórkowa, zupa grzybowa (mushroom soup), żurek, zupa pomidorowa (tomato soup) have been prepared in large vessels intended for groups, often necessitating the use of devices such as oars in their preparation. Traditionally, hospitality is very important.

In the Middle Ages, as the cities of Poland grew larger in size and the food markets developed, the culinary exchange of ideas progressed & people got acquainted with new dishes and recipes. Some regions became well known for the type of sausage they made and many sausages of today still carry those original names. The peasants acknowledged their honorable judgment, allowing them to remain nourished for longer periods of time.

The first known written mention of vodka was in 1405 in Akta Grodzkie, the court documents from the Palatinate of Sandomierz in Poland. At the time, the word vodka (wódka), referred to chemical compounds such as medicines and cosmetics' cleansers, while the popular beverage was called gorzałka (from the Old Polish gorzeć meaning to burn).

According to a 2009 Ernst & Young report, Poland is Europe's third largest beer producer: Germany with 103 million hectolitres, UK with 49.5 million hl, Poland with 36.9 million hl. Following consecutive growth in the home market, Polish Union of the Brewing Industry Employers (Związek Pracodawców Przemysłu Piwowarskiego), which represents approximately 90% of the Polish beer market, announced during the annual brewing industry conference that consumption of beer in 2008 rose to 94 litres per capita, or 35,624 million hectolitres sold on domestic market. Statistically, a Polish consumer drinks some 92 litres of beer a year, which places it a third behind Germany. Drinking beer as a basic drink was typical during the Middle Ages. Wine is recently becoming more popular. In fact, Polish mead, a honey wine was a traditional drink dating back also to the Middle Ages.

Soft drinks include "napoje gazowane" (carbonated drinks), "napoje bezalkoholowe" (non-alcoholic drinks) like water, tea, juice, coffee or kompot. Kompot is a non-alcoholic beverage made of boiled fruit, optionally with sugar and spices (clove or cinnamon), served hot or cold. It can be made of one type of fruit or a mixture, including apples, peaches, pears, strawberries or sour cherries. Also, Susz is type of kompot made with dried fruits, most commonly apples, apricots, figs. Traditionally served on Christmas Eve.

Among holiday meals, there is a traditional Christmas Eve supper called Wigilia. Another special occasion is Fat Thursday ("Tłusty Czwartek"), a Catholic feast celebrated on the last Thursday before the Lent. Traditionally it is a day when people eat large amounts of pączki and other sweets and cakes that are afterwards forbidden until Easter day (see also: the Polish traditional Easter Breakfast).

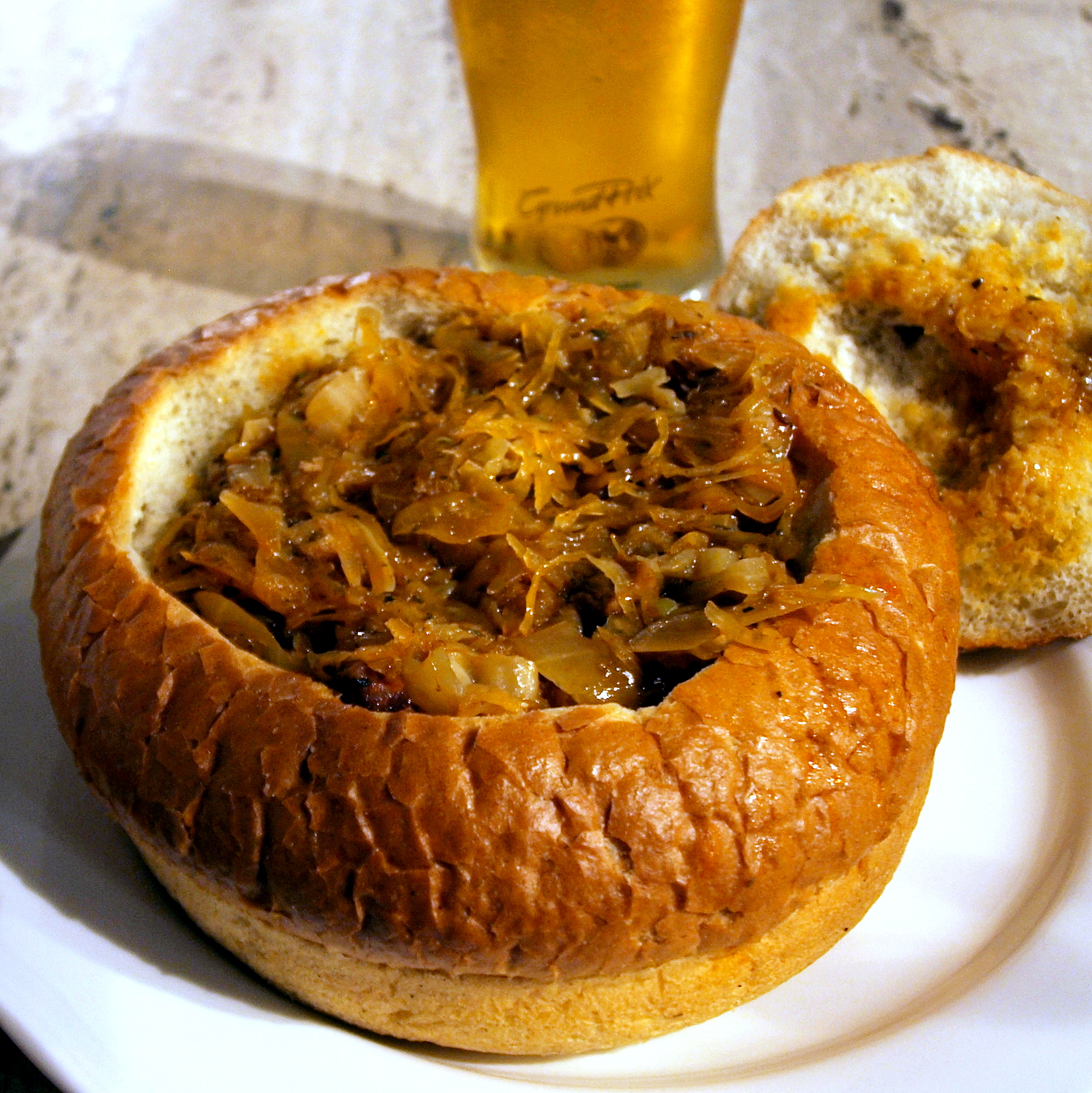
Bigos stew and a glass of Tyskie beer

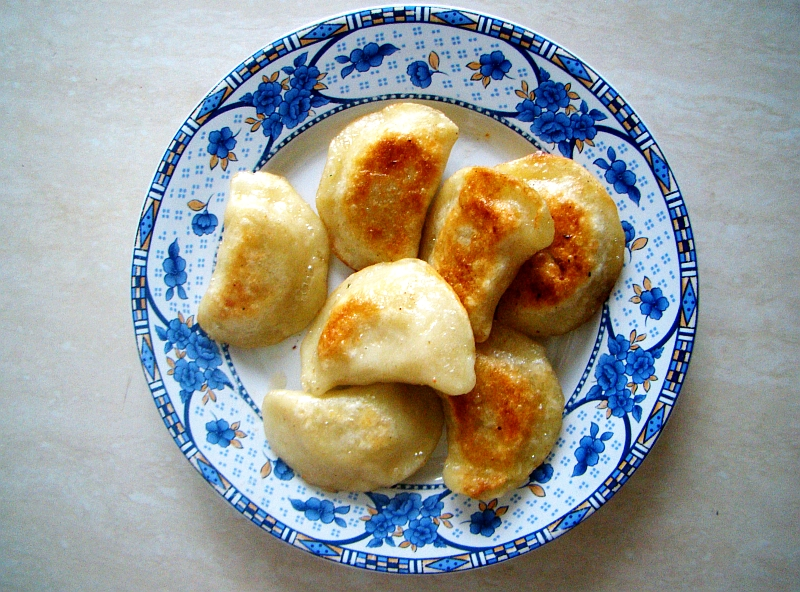
Traditional Christmas Eve Pierogi

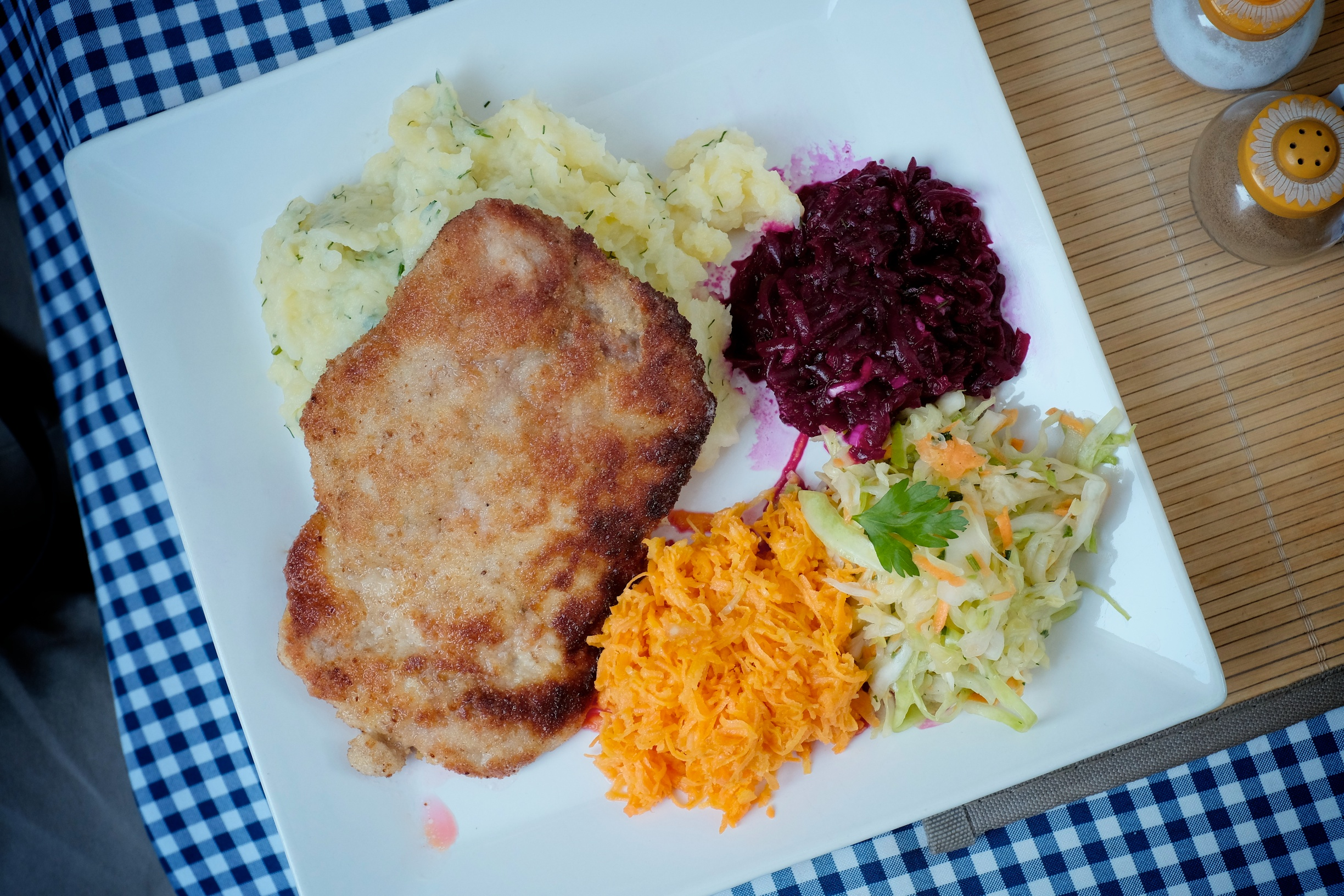
Kotlet schabowy served with potatoes and raw vegetable salads

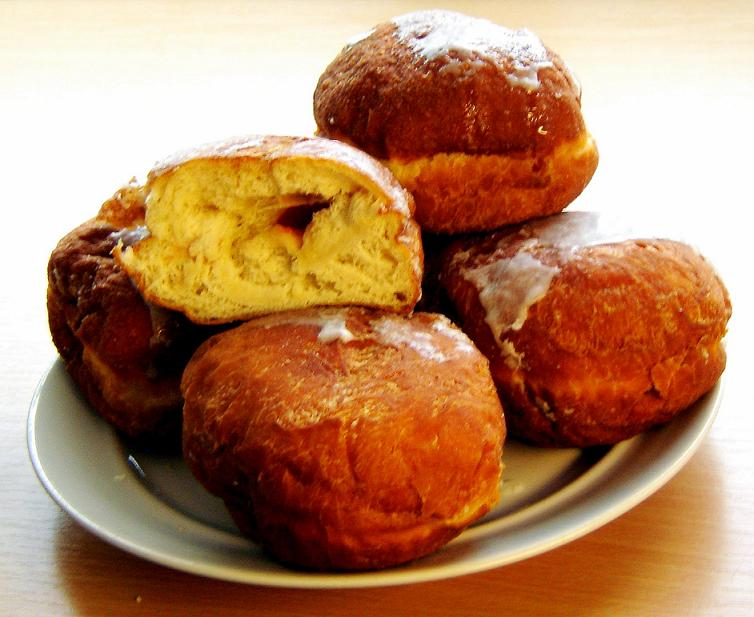
Pączki jam doughnuts
Traditional Polish kitchen
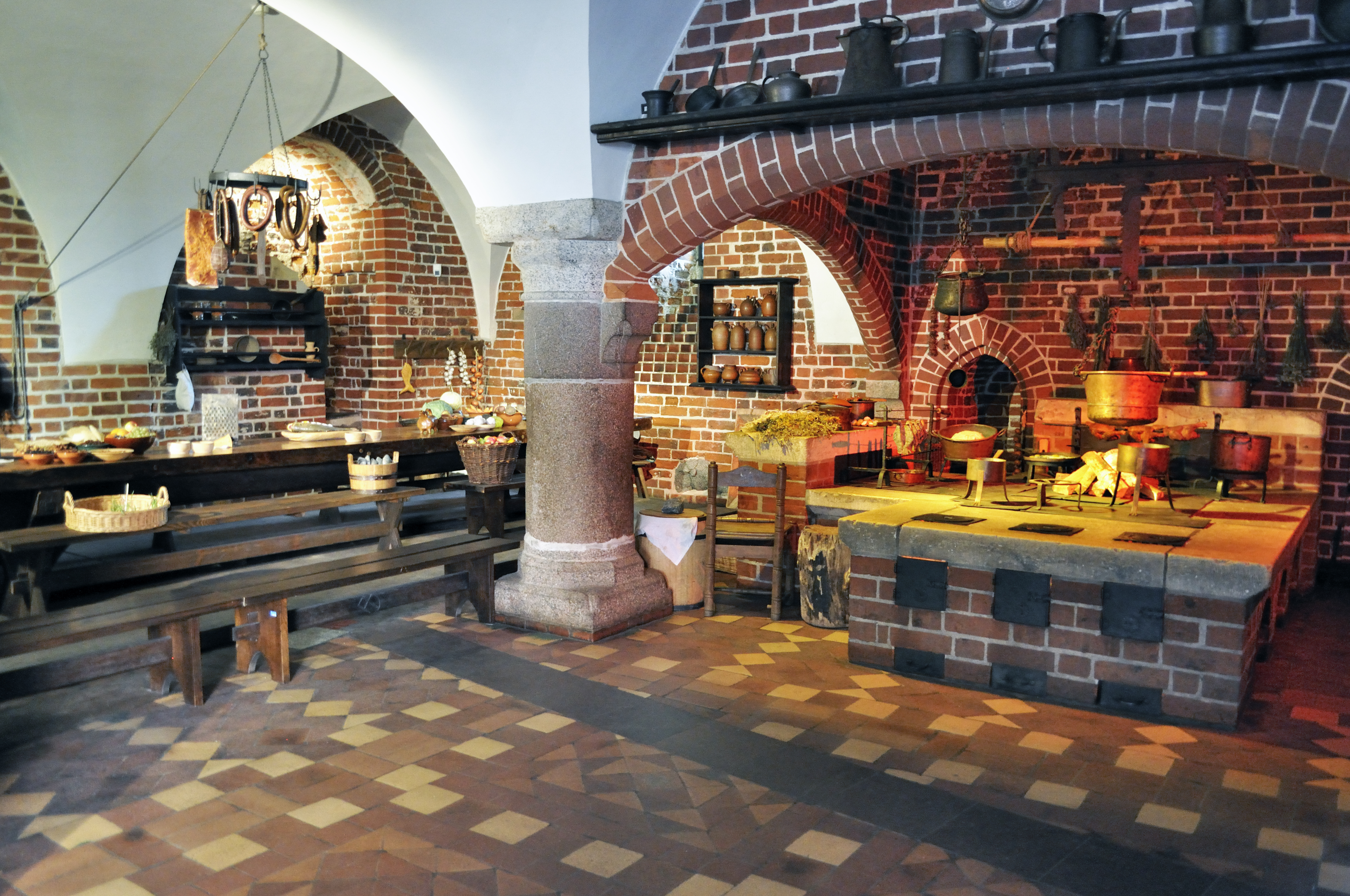
Medieval kitchen from the 14th century

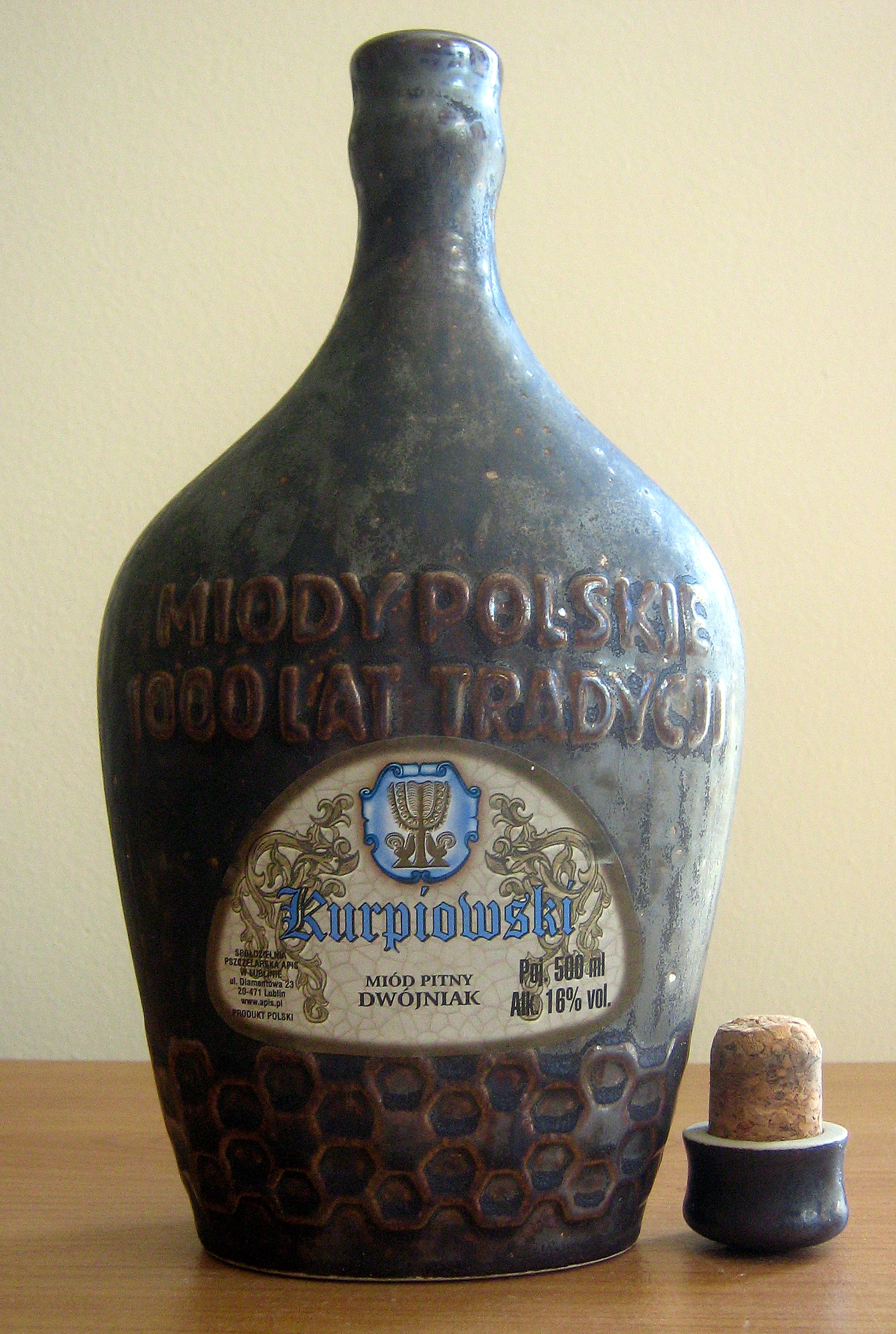
Mead Kurpiowski Dwójniak

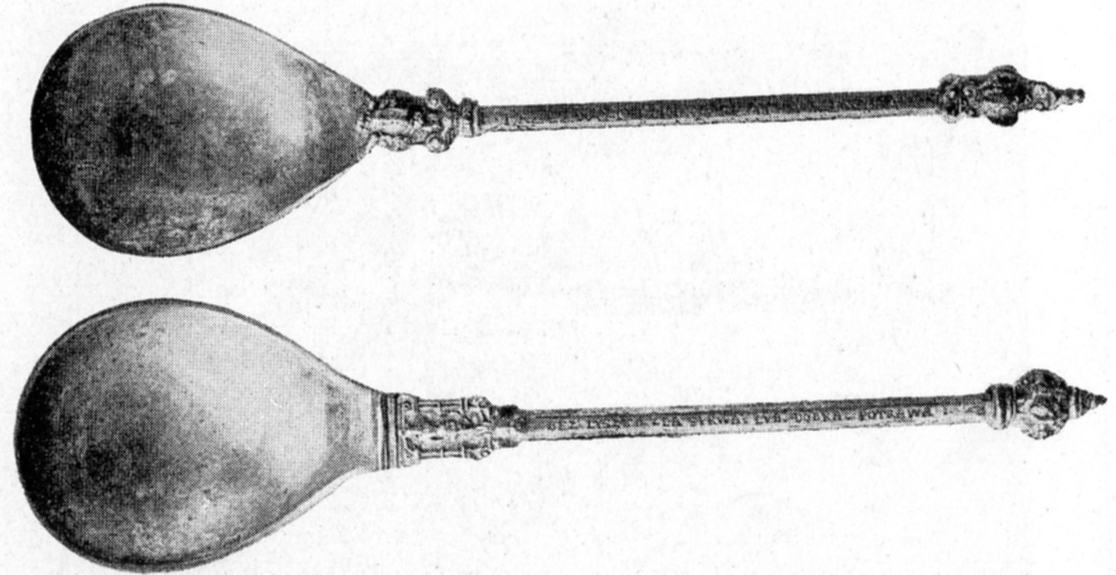
Polish spoons from the 16th century

== Architecture ==
Polish cities and towns reflect the whole spectrum of European styles. Poland's (along with Hungary's) eastern frontiers used to mark the outermost boundary of Western architecture on the continent, with strong influences derived from Italy, Germany and the Low Countries. Cities established under Magdeburg Law evolved around central marketplaces (plac, rynek), encircled by a network of streets forming an old town (stare miasto). Poland's built heritage and landscape include elaborate churches, tenements and town halls. The most noticeable feature of historic Polish architecture are façades with decorated attics above the cornice.

The architecture of Gdańsk is mostly Hanseatic, common in cities along the Baltic Sea and in the northern part of Central Europe. The architectural style of Wrocław is representative of Bohemian, Austrian and German architecture, since it was German-speaking for centuries. The center of Kazimierz Dolny on the Vistula is a good example of a well-preserved medieval town, also local variation of Renaissance architecture has been developed called Lublin Renaissance it has preserved in Lublin as Lublin Old Town and Old City of Zamość in Zamość. Poland's former capital, Kraków, ranks among the best-preserved Gothic and Renaissance urban complexes in Europe. Polish architecture also spread to the cities and towns across the Eastern Borderlands of what was then the Polish–Lithuanian Commonwealth, with Wilno (Vilnius) and Lwów (Lviv, Lemberg) being most notable examples.

One of the best-preserved examples of the Modernist architecture in Europe is located in Katowice, Upper Silesia, designed and built in the 1930s. Interesting buildings were also constructed during the Communist era in the style of Socialist Realism; some remarkable examples of modern architecture were erected more recently.

Architecture of Poland
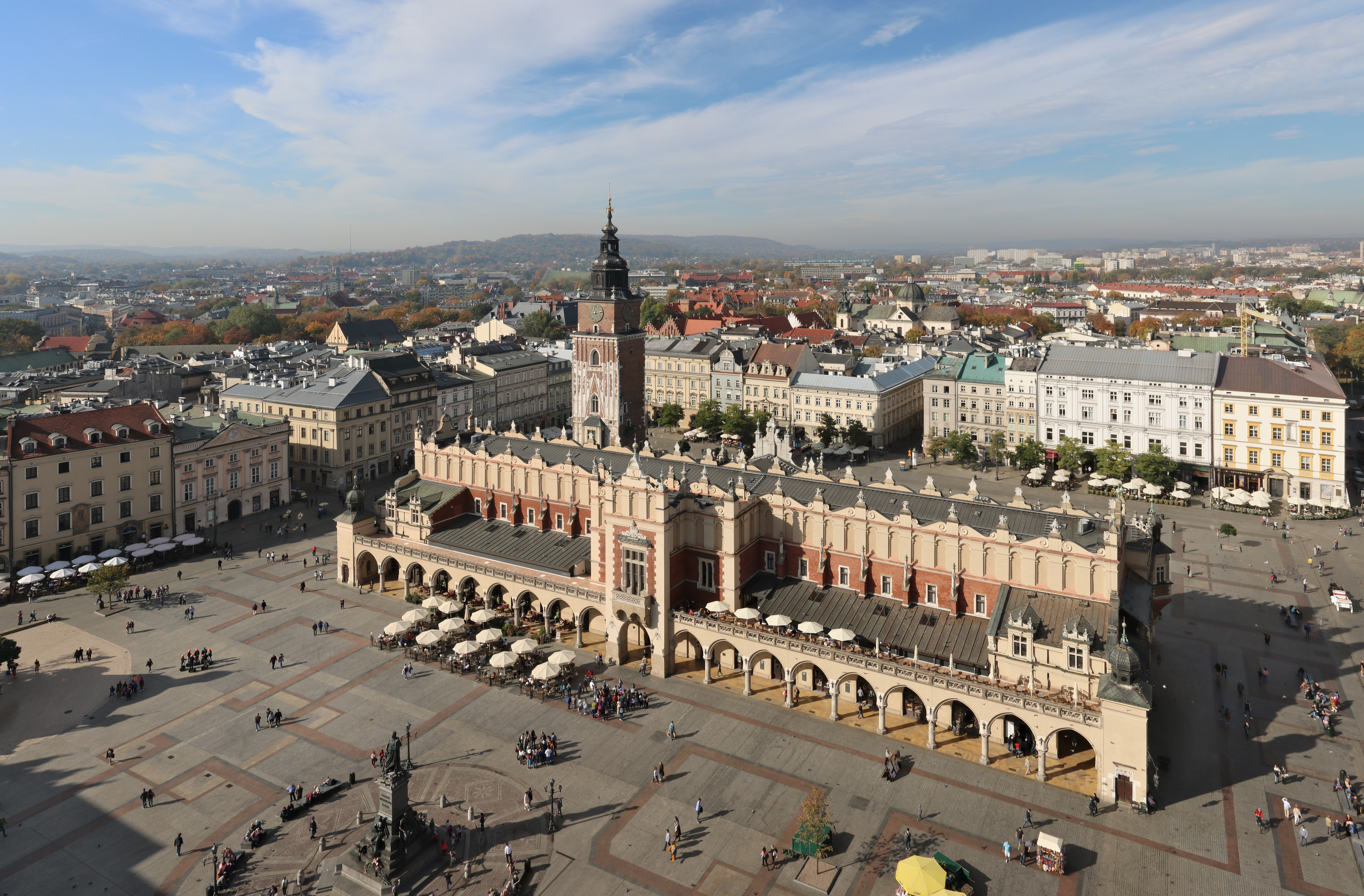
Sukiennice (cloth-hall), with medieval Kraków ratusz (city-hall) tower on the left.

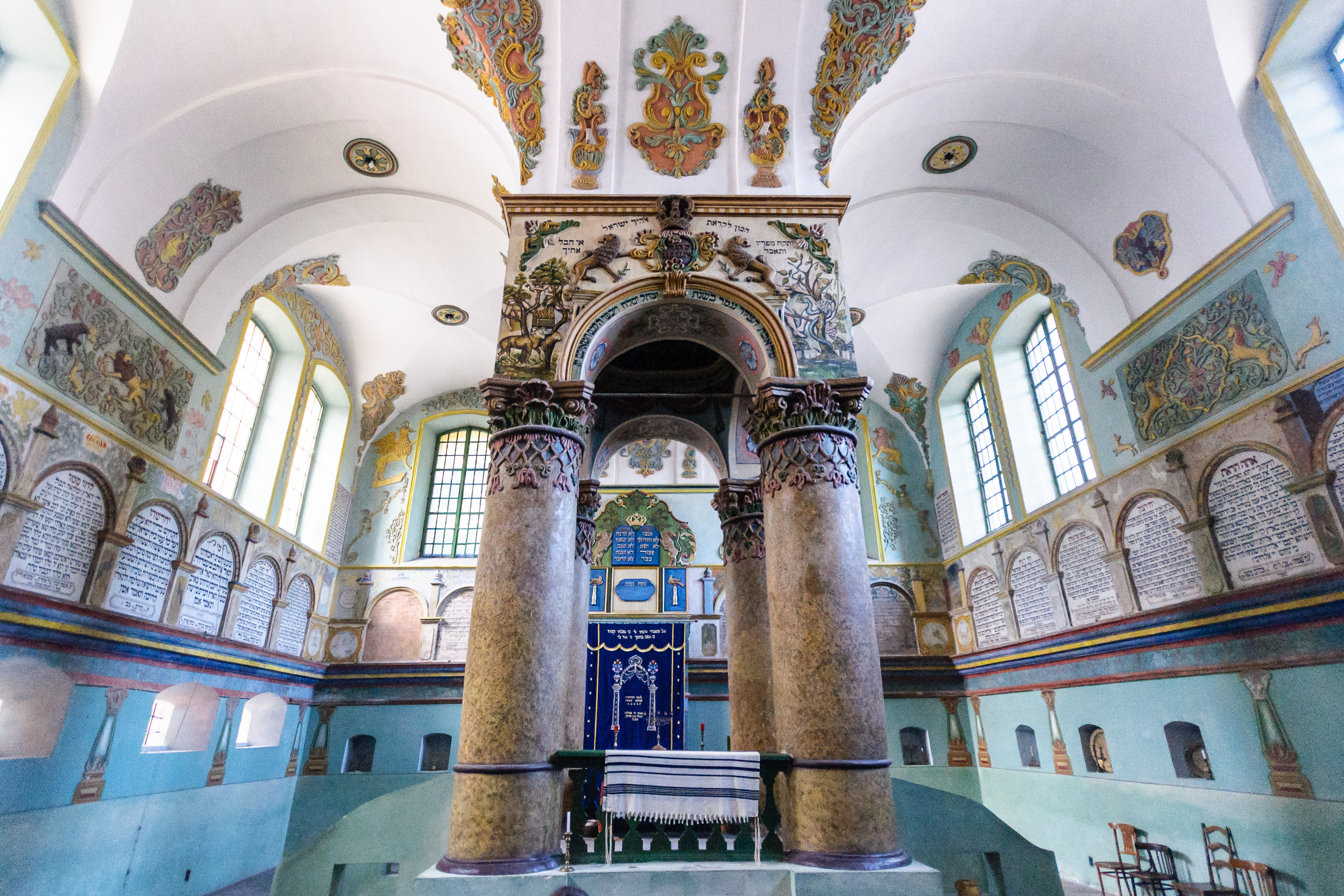
Interior of the Łańcut Synagogue, a testament to Poland’s rich Jewish heritage.

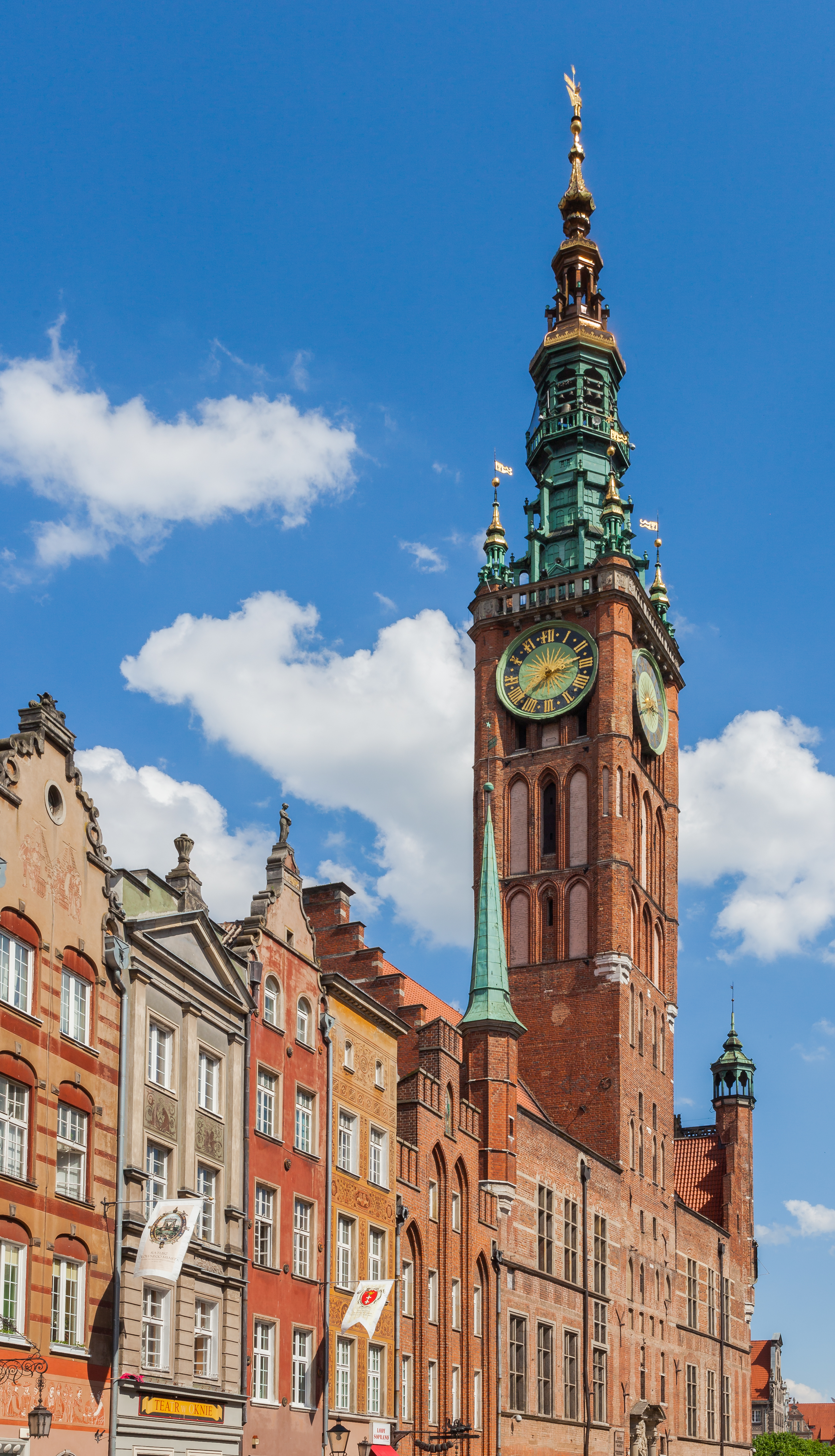
City hall in Gdańsk, where the architecture reflects historical ties to the Hanseatic League.

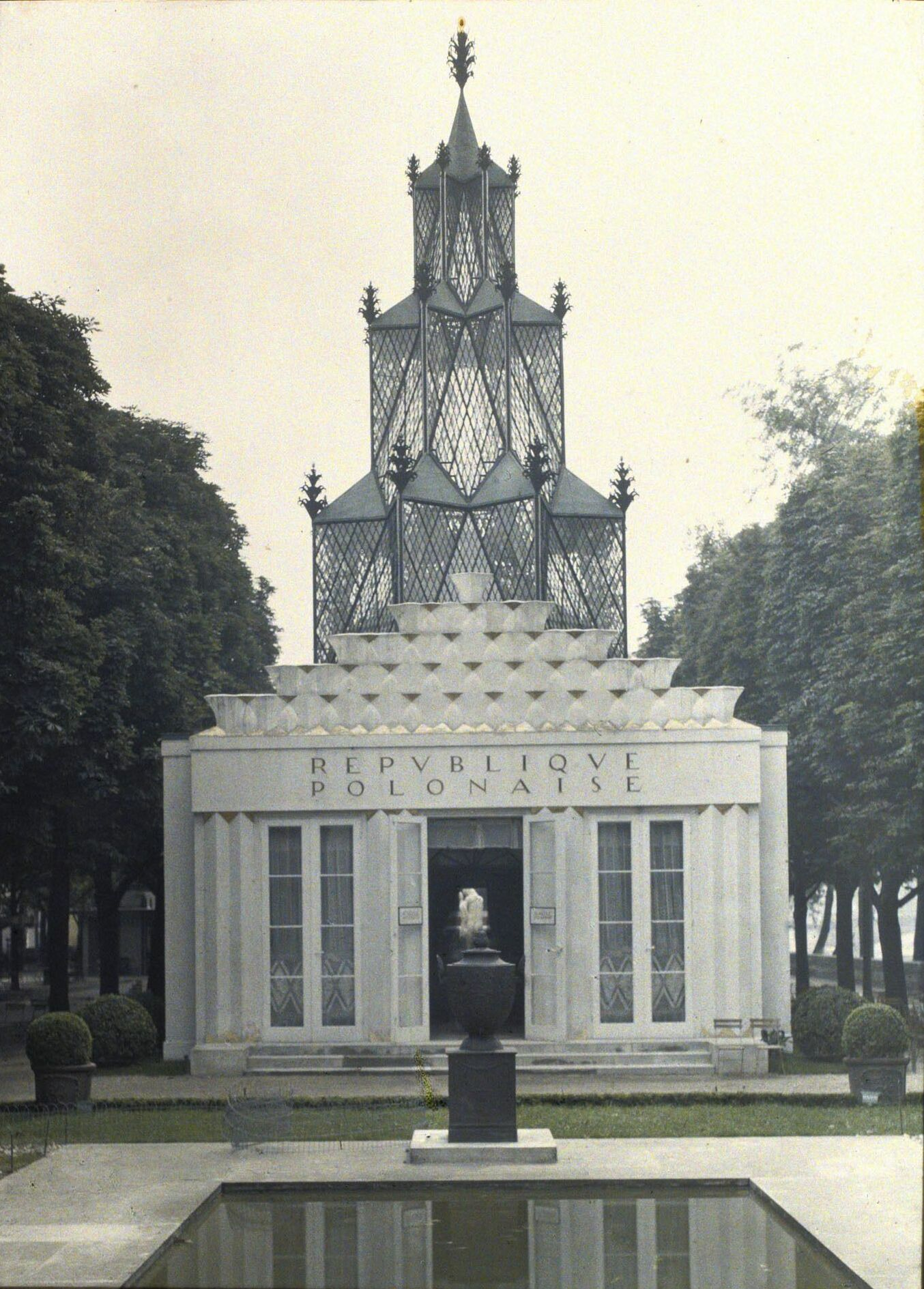
Polish art déco pavilion including its artworks representing the culture of Poland, Paris, 1925. The building was awarded the Grand Prix.

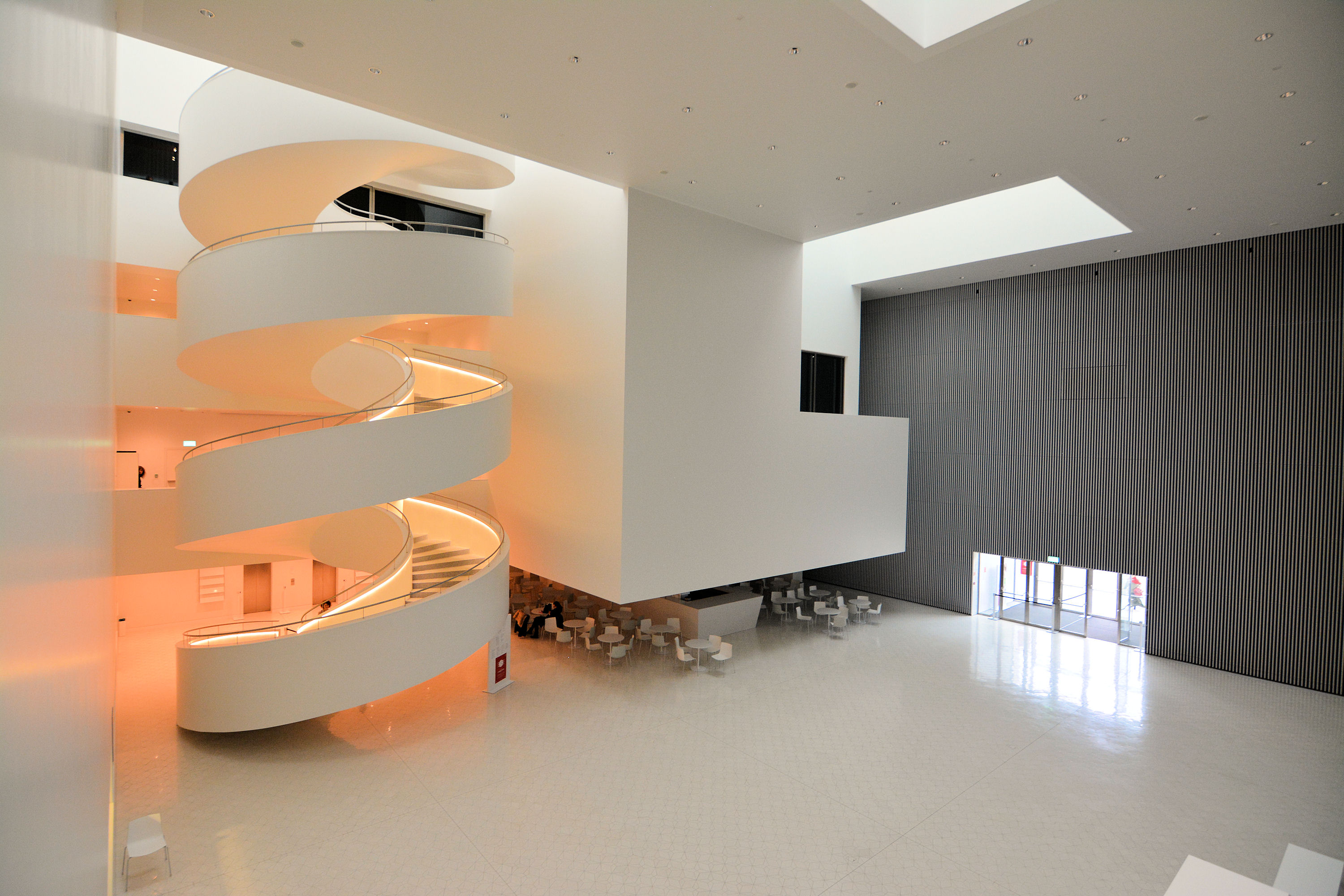
Szczecin Philharmonic was awarded the European Union Prize for Contemporary Architecture

== Art ==
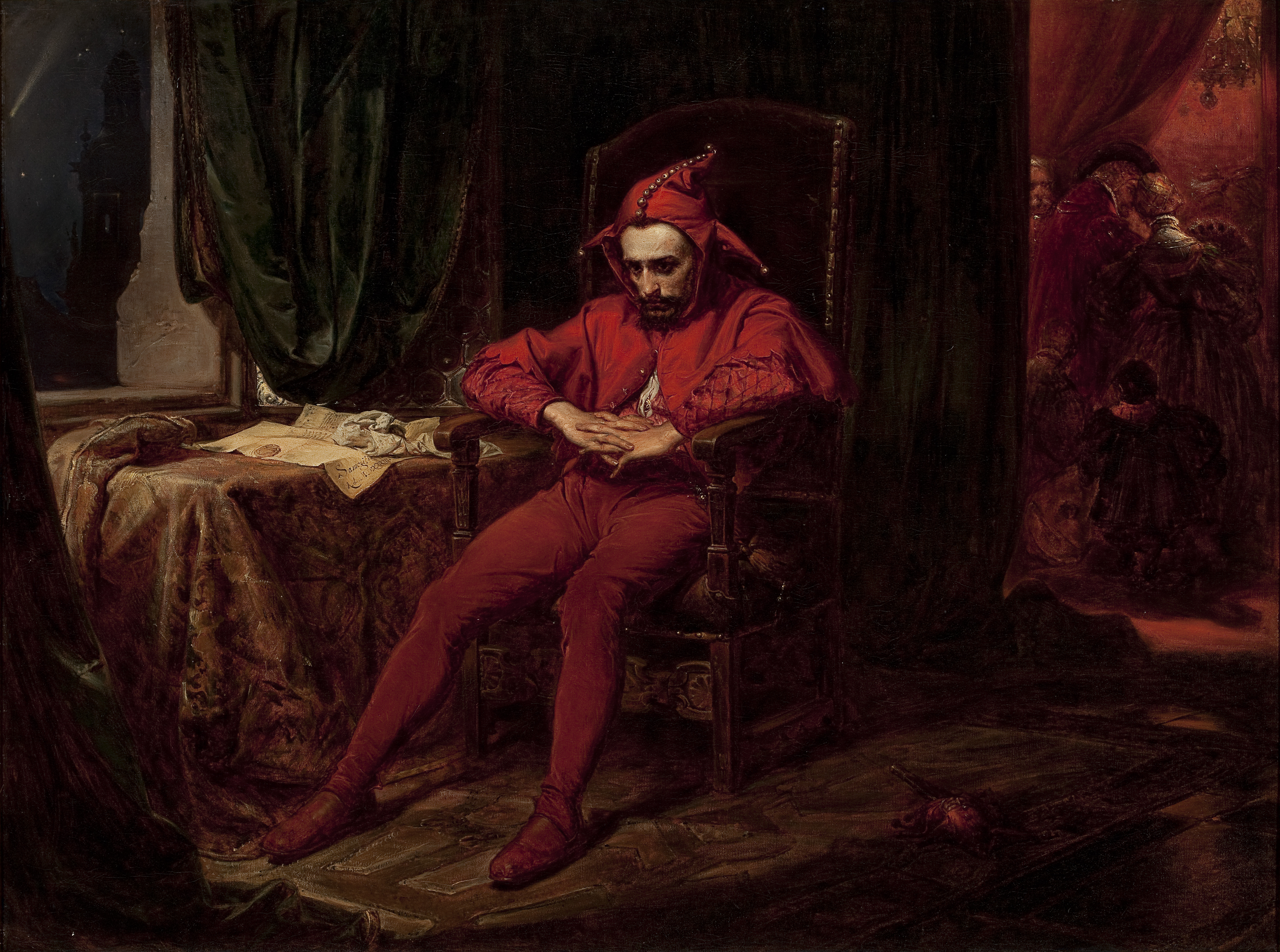
Stańczyk, painted in 1862 by Jan Matejko

Polish art has always reflected European trends while maintaining its unique character. The Kraków school of Historicist painting developed by Jan Matejko produced monumental portrayals of customs and significant events in Polish history. Stanisław Witkiewicz was an ardent supporter of Realism in Polish art, its main representative being Jozef Chełmoński.

The Młoda Polska (Young Poland) movement witnessed the birth of modern Polish art and engaged in a great deal of formal experimentation led by Jacek Malczewski (Symbolism), Stanisław Wyspiański, Józef Mehoffer, and a group of Polish Impressionists. Artists of the 20th century Avant-garde represented various schools and trends. The art of Tadeusz Makowski was influenced by Cubism; while Władysław Strzemiński as well as Henryk Stażewski worked within the Constructivist idiom, and Tamara de Lempicka in the Art Deco style. Distinguished contemporary artists include Monika Sosnowska, Roman Opałka, Leon Tarasewicz, Jerzy Nowosielski, Mirosław Bałka, and Katarzyna Kozyra and Alicja Kwade in the younger generation. The most celebrated Polish sculptors include Xawery Dunikowski, Katarzyna Kobro, Alina Szapocznikow and Magdalena Abakanowicz. Since the inter-war years, Polish art and documentary photography has enjoyed worldwide recognition. In the 1960s, the Polish Poster School was formed, with Henryk Tomaszewski and Waldemar Świerzy at its head.

Leading Polish painters
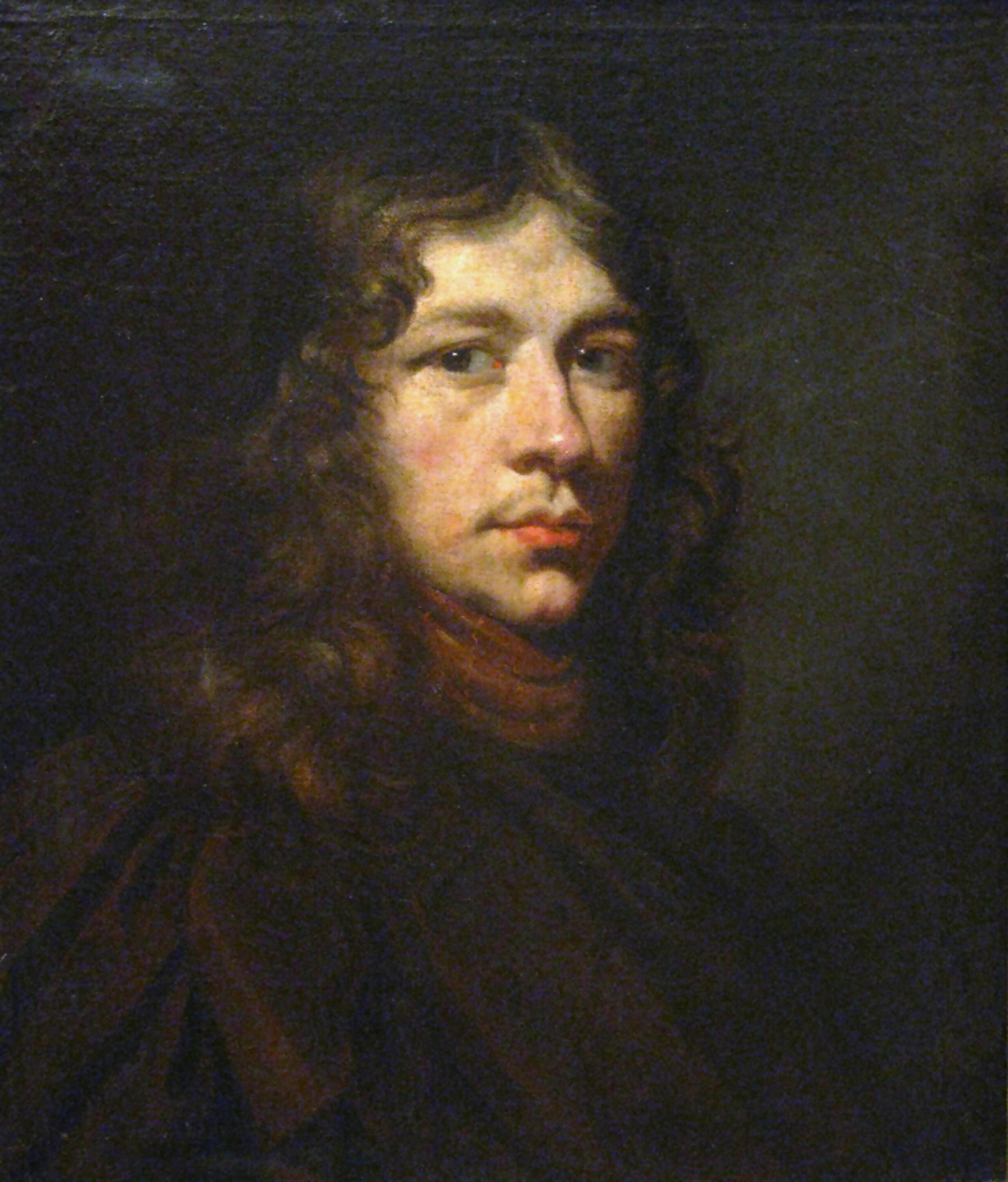
Daniel Schultz
(1615–1683)

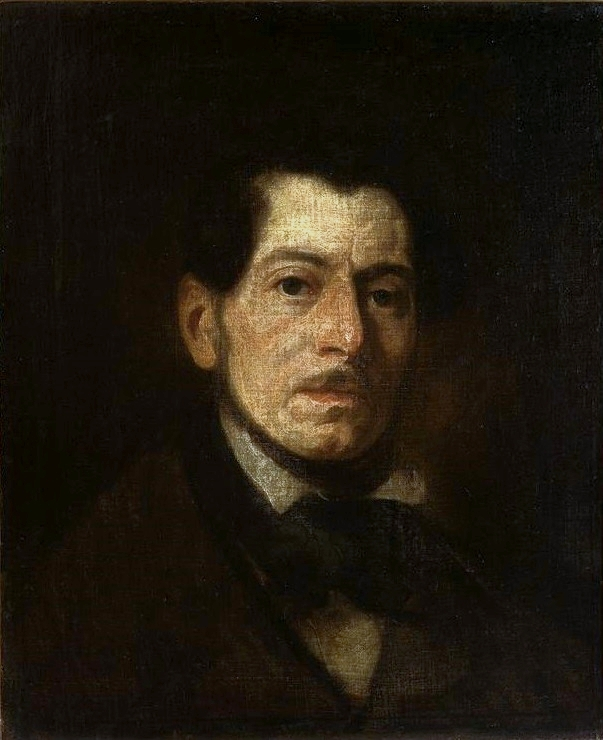
Piotr Michałowski
(1800–1855)

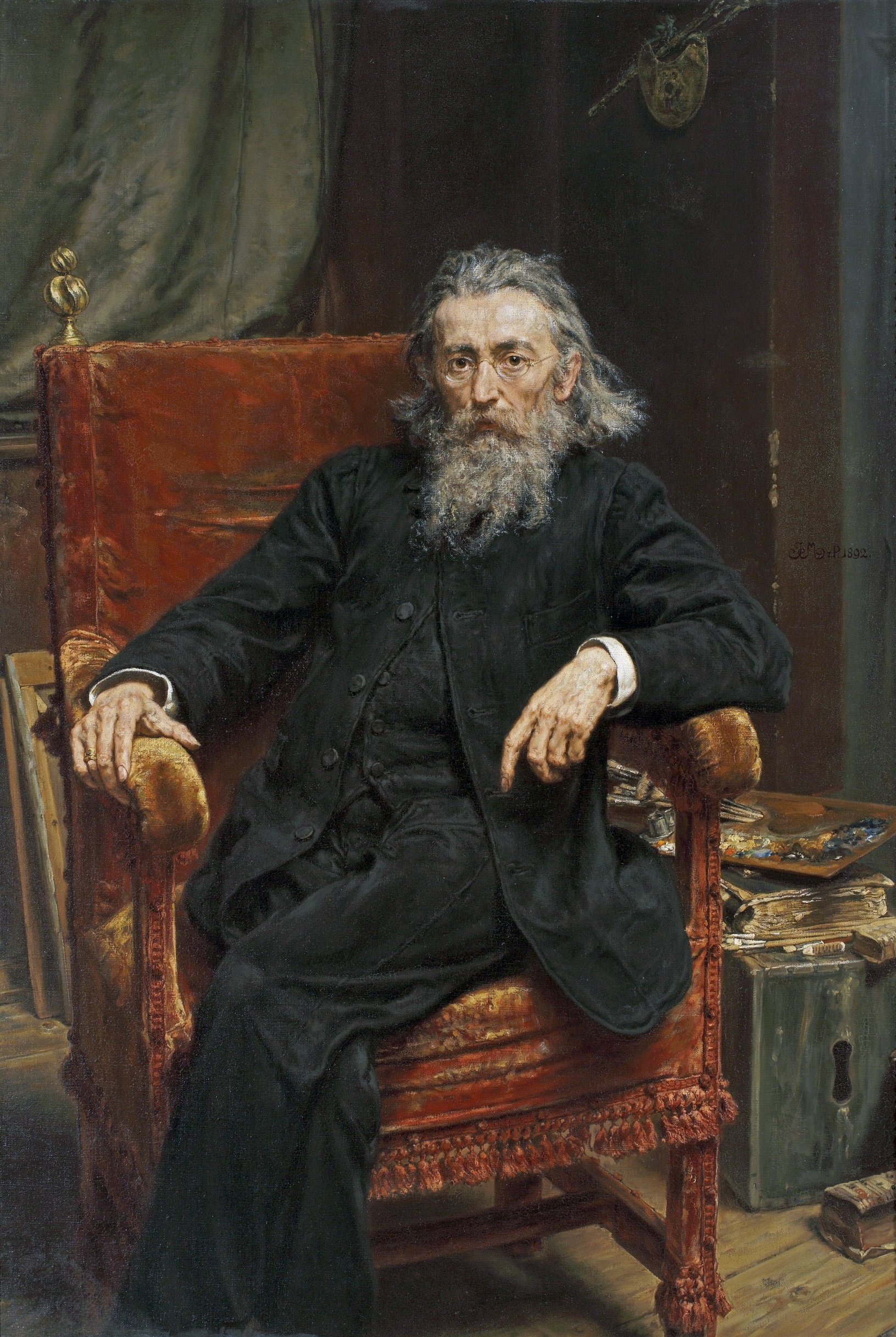
Jan Matejko
(1838–1893)

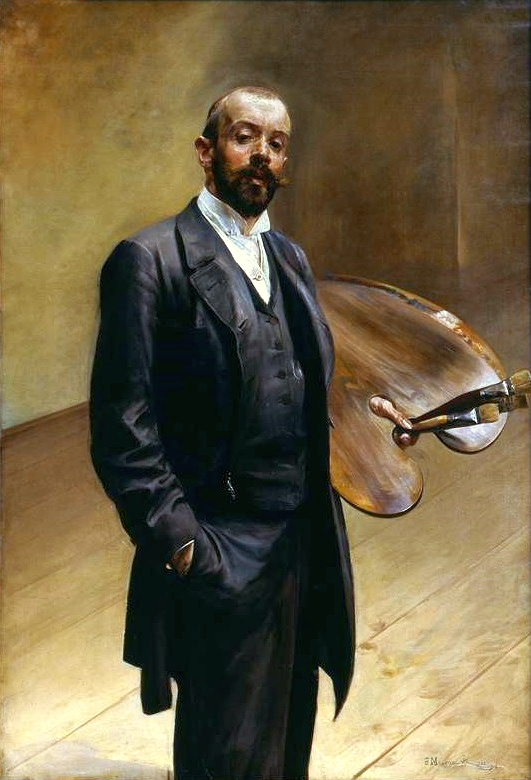
Jacek Malczewski
(1854–1929)
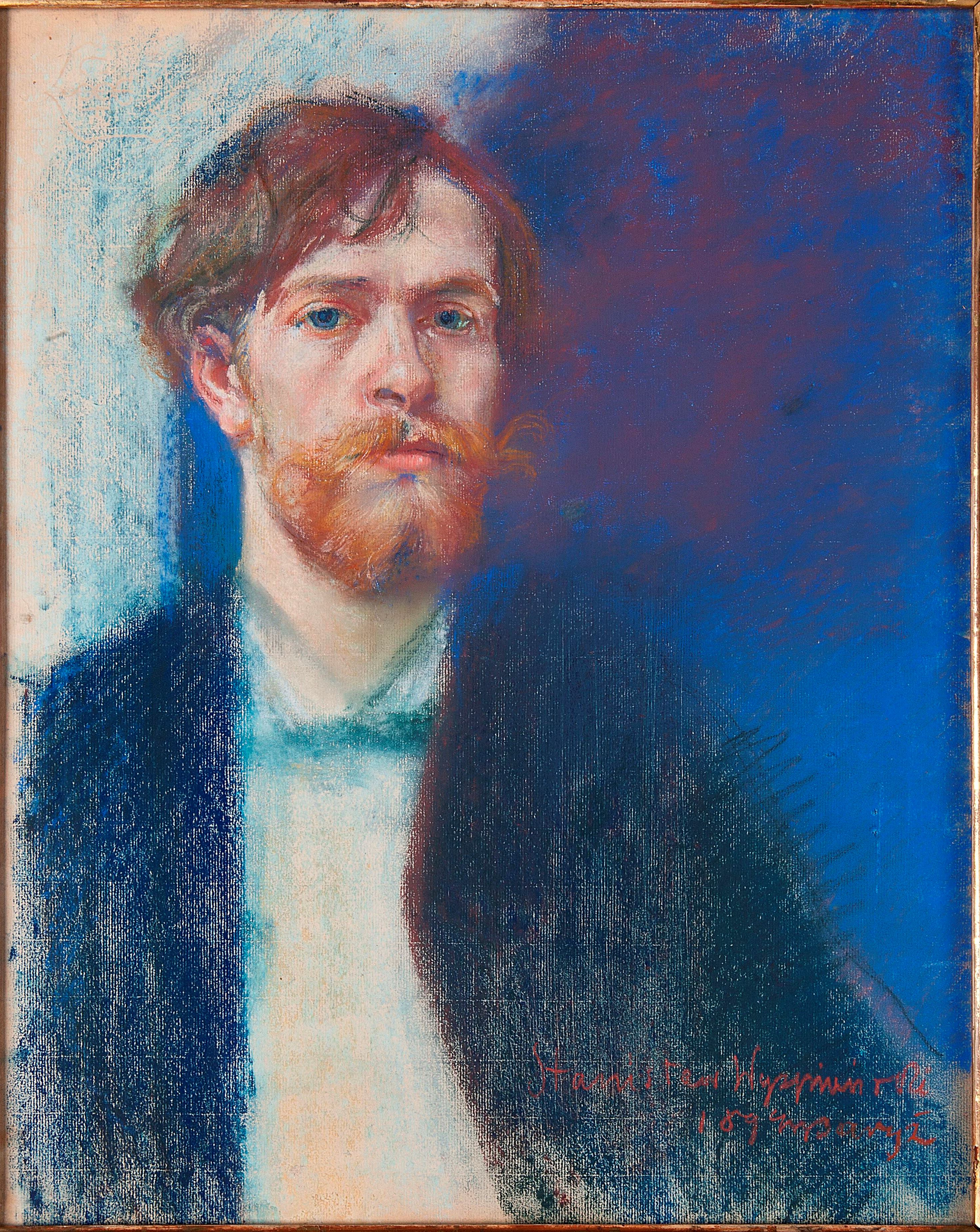
Stanisław Wyspiański
(1869–1907)

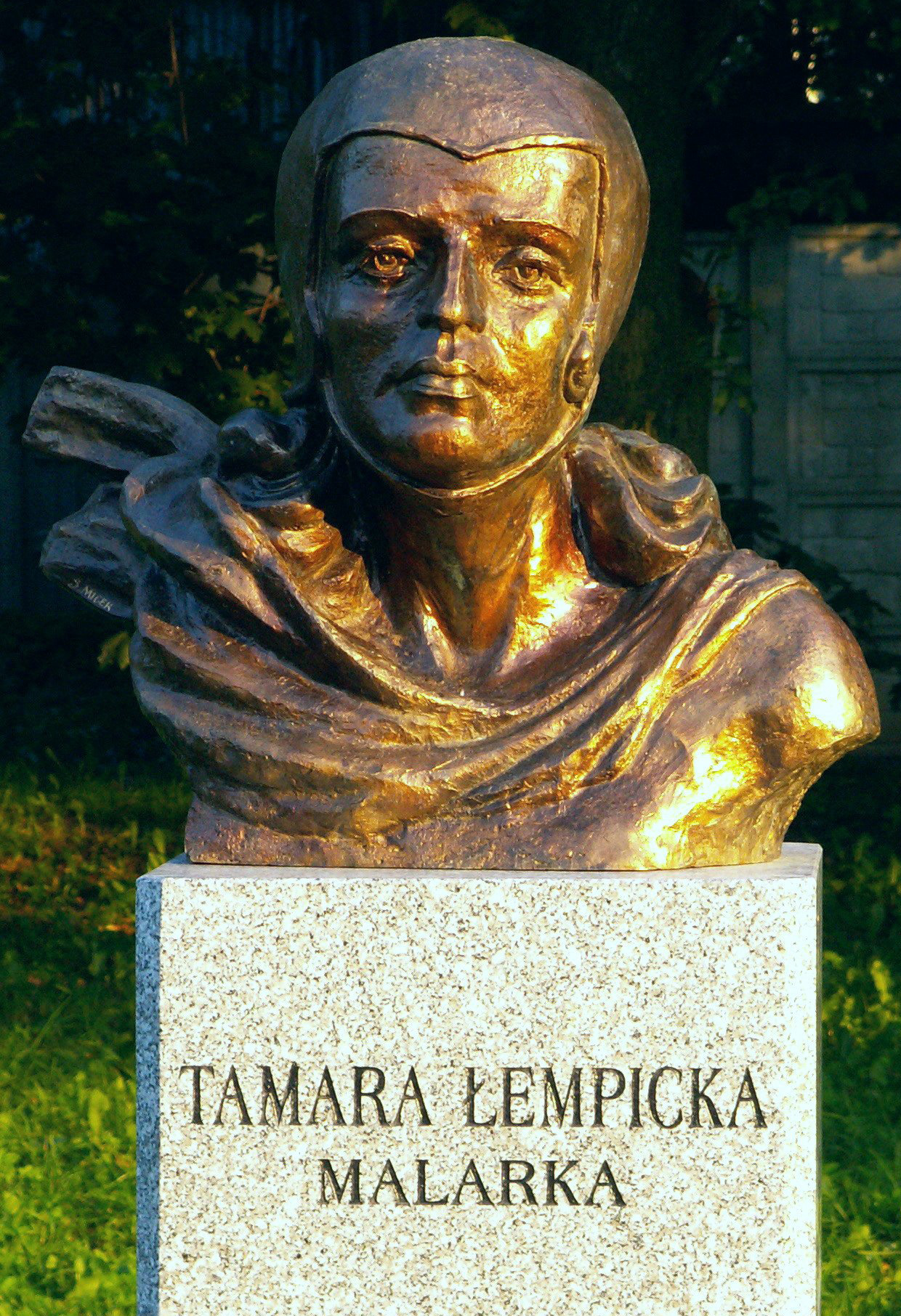
Tamara de Lempicka
(1898–1980)

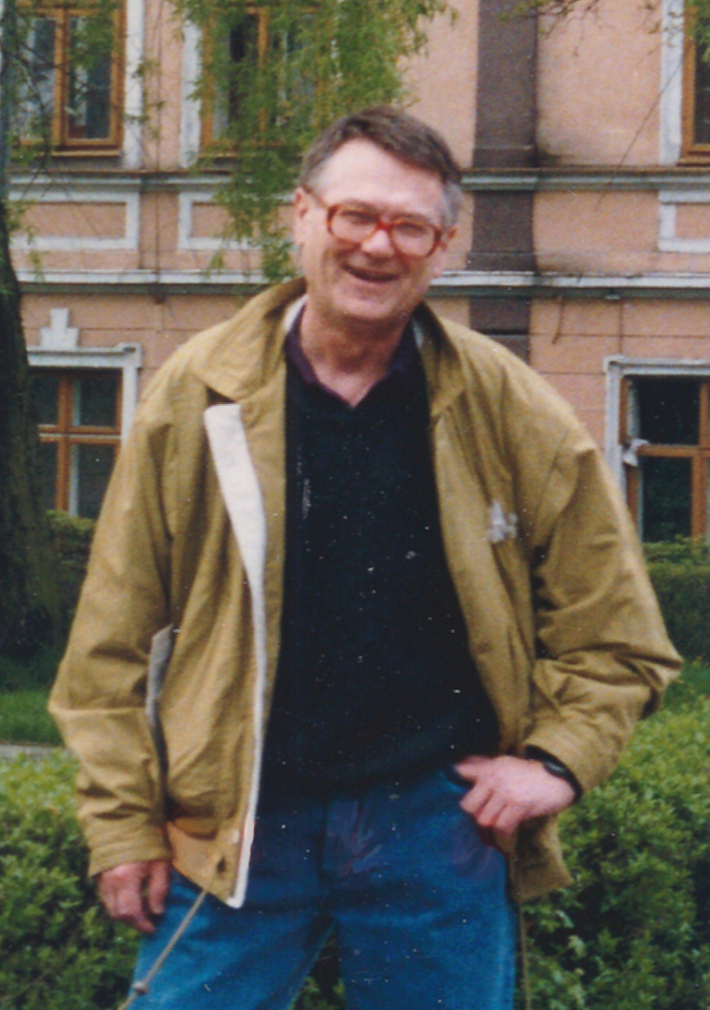
Zdzisław Beksiński
(1929–2005)

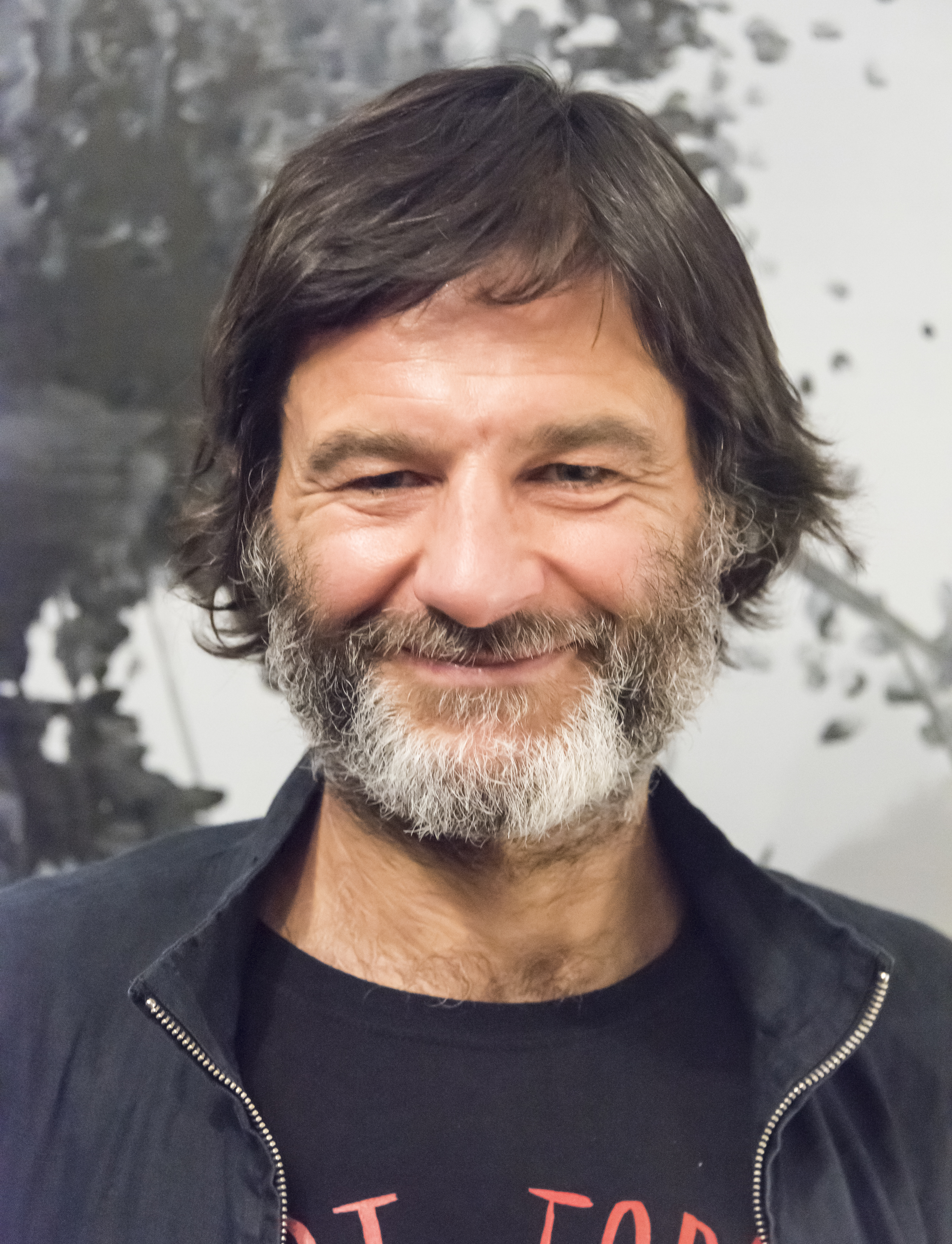
Wilhelm Sasnal
(b. 1972)

== Dance ==
Dance in Poland consists of a diverse array of traditional and contemporary forms of dance. Traditional dances are often an important part of cultural celebrations, and these dances vary across regions of the country. The national dances of Poland are krakowiak (cracovienne), oberek, polonaise, kujawiak and mazur (mazurka).

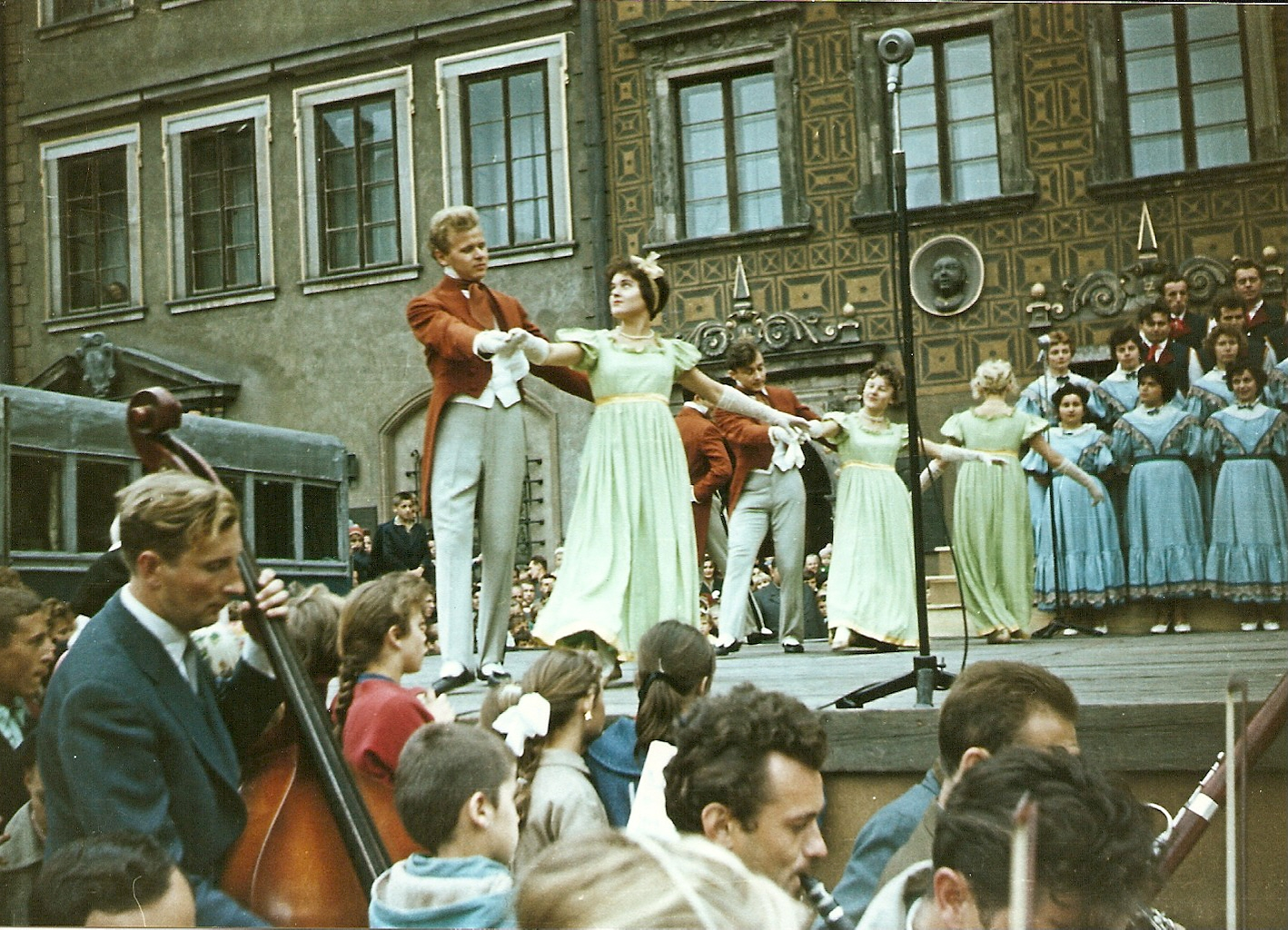
Polonaise

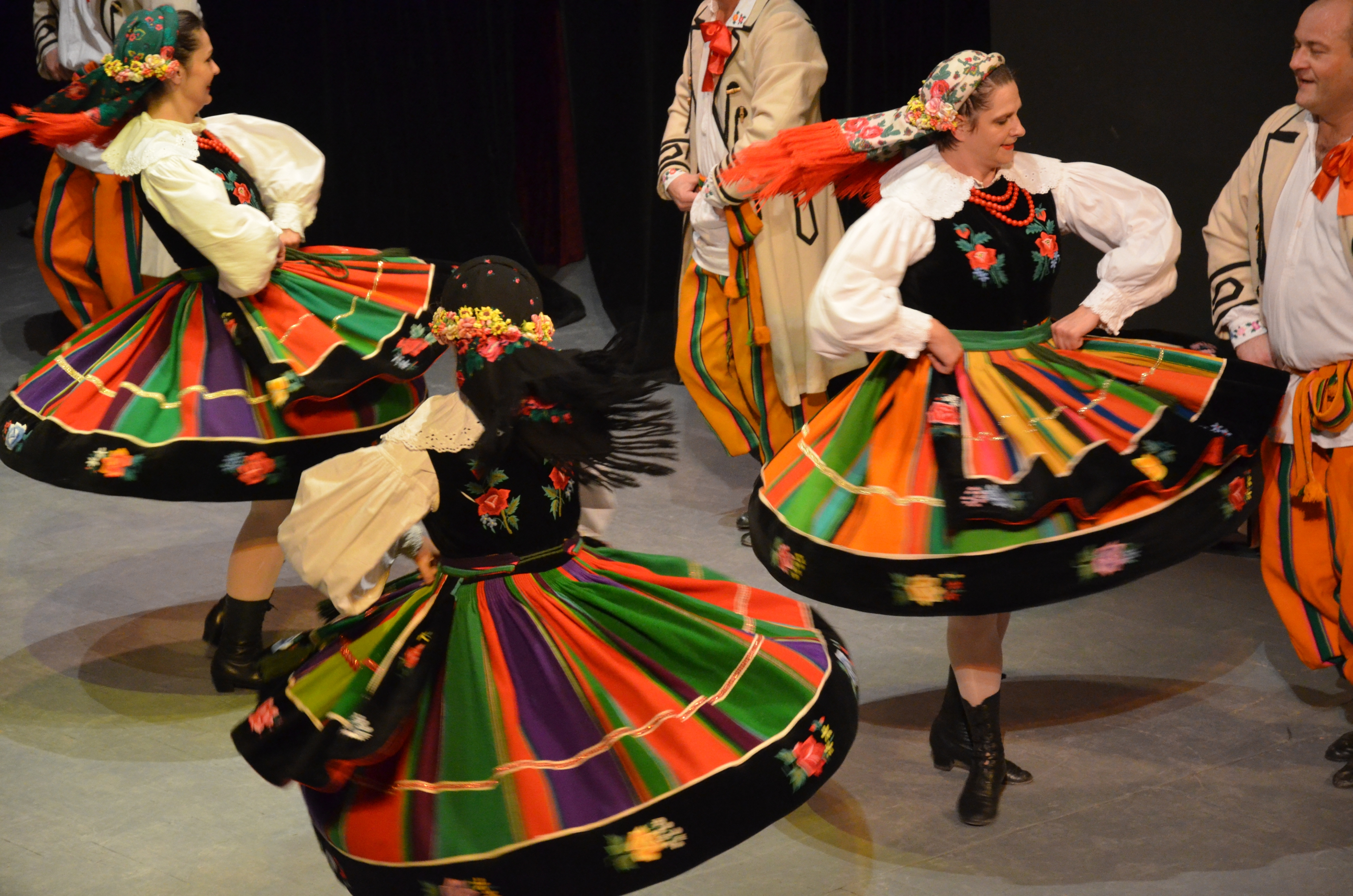
Oberek

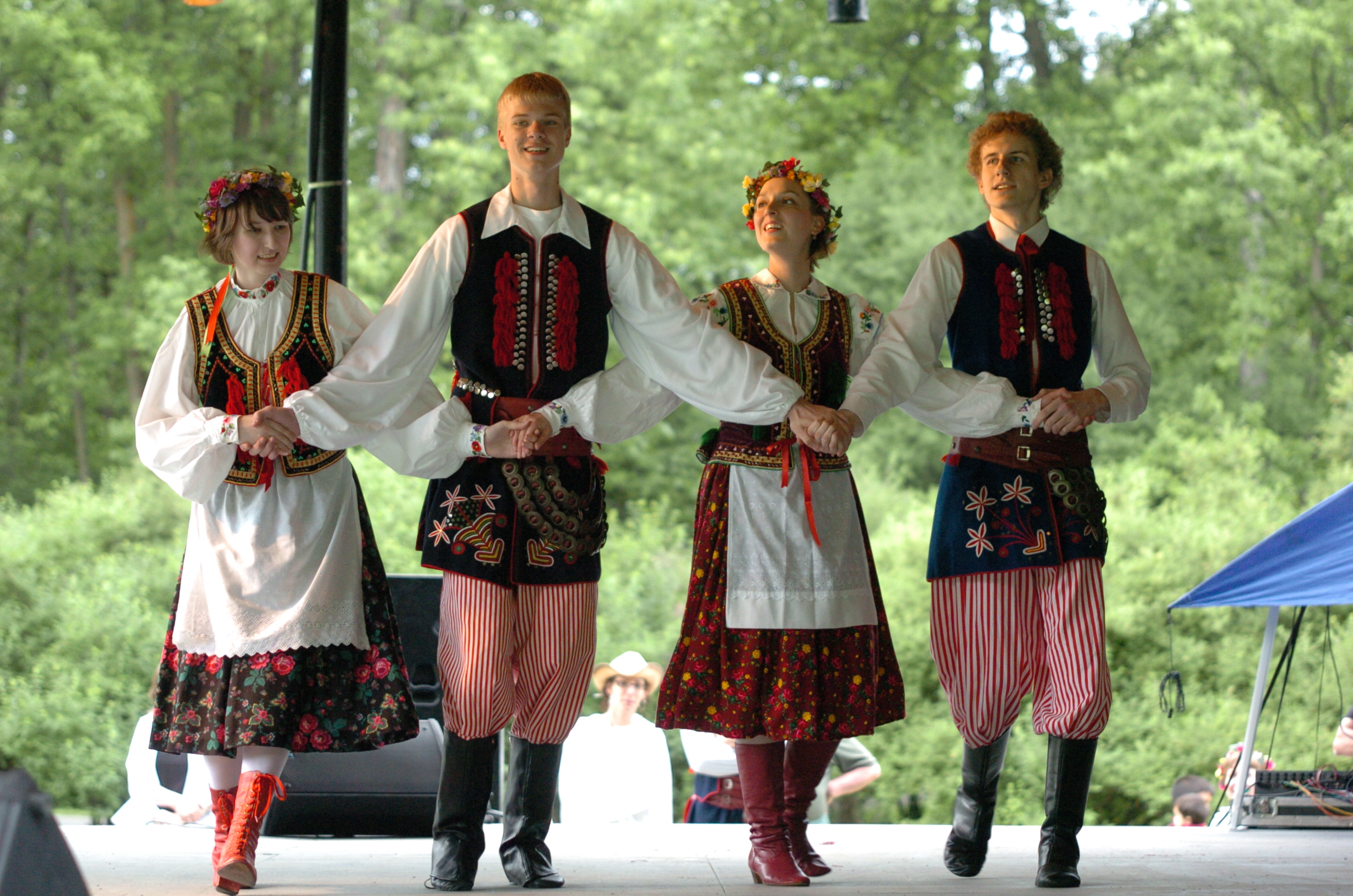
Kujawiak

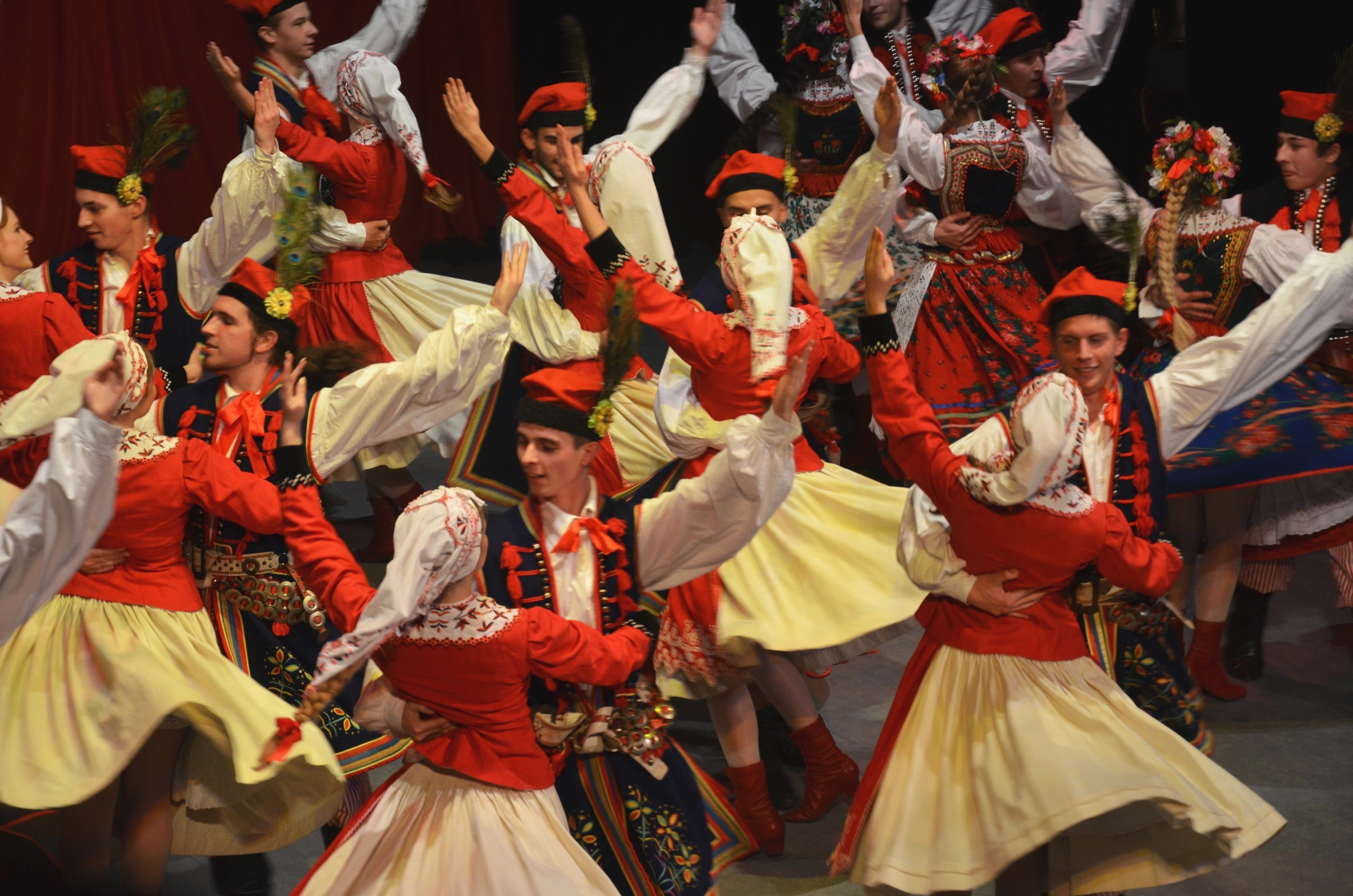
Krakowiak (cracovienne)

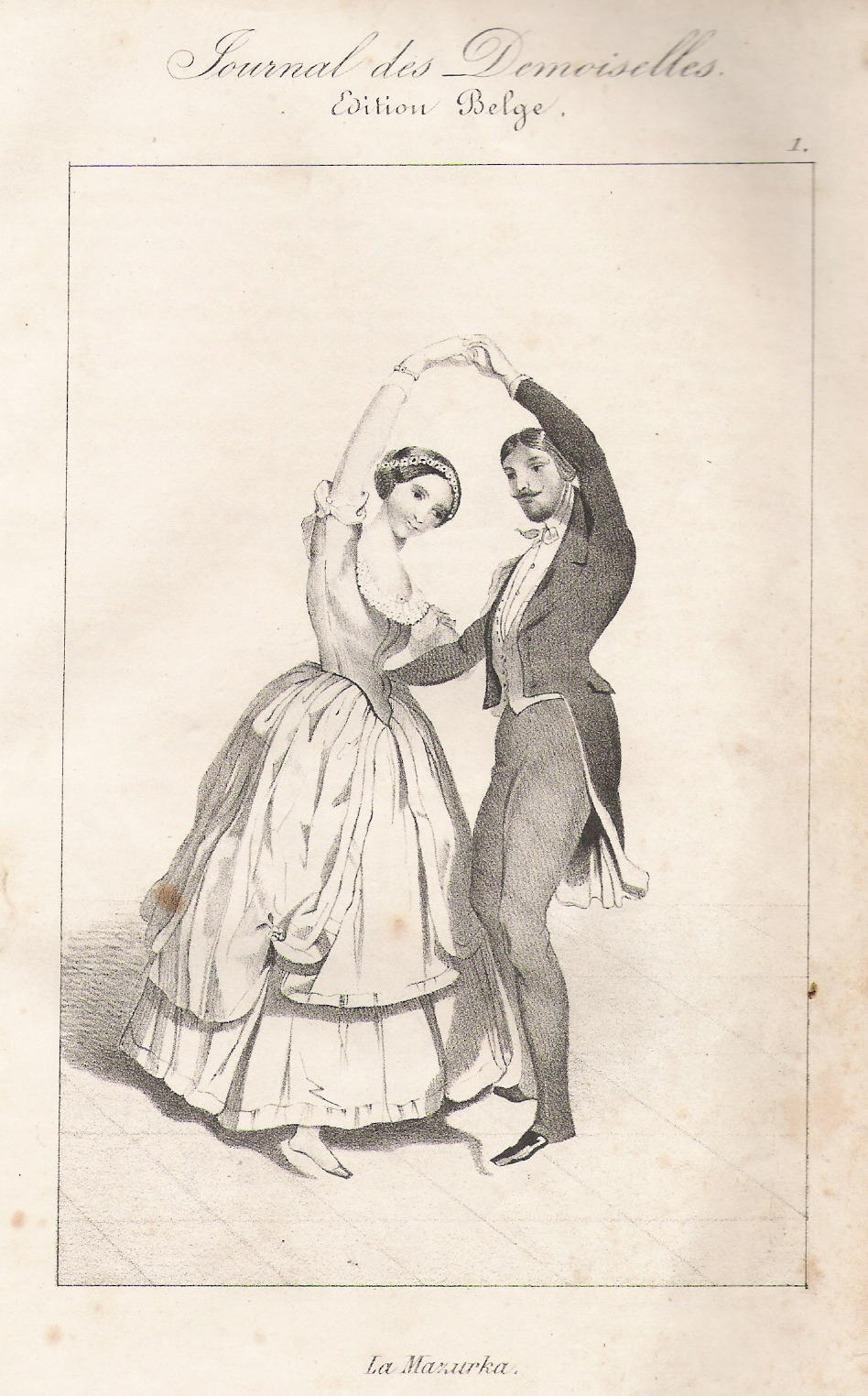
Mazur (mazurka)

== Music ==
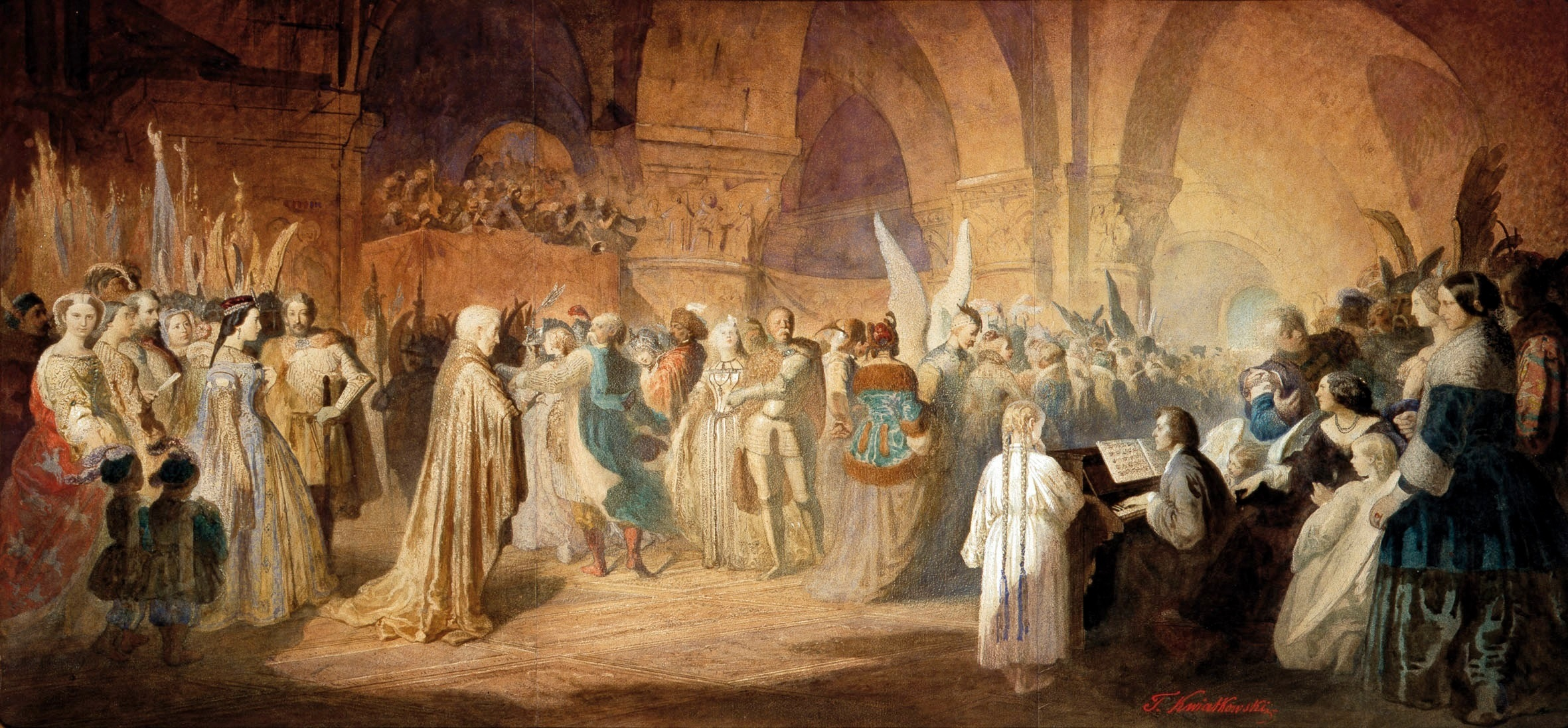
Chopin's Polonaise, by Kwiatkowski, depicting a ball at Count Czartoryski's Hôtel Lambert in Paris. National Museum, Poznań

Artists from Poland, including composers like Karol Lipiński, Frédéric Chopin or Witold Lutosławski and traditional, regionalised folk musicians, represent the variety of Poland's music scene. Today in Poland, one may find trance, techno, house music, and heavy metal. Poland also has its own music genres, such as sung poetry.

The origin of Polish music can be traced as far back as the 13th century, from which manuscripts have been found in Stary Sącz, containing polyphonic compositions related to the Parisian Notre Dame School. Other early compositions, such as the melody of Bogurodzica, may also date back to this period. The first known notable composer, however, Mikołaj z Radomia, lived in the 15th century. The melody of Bóg się rodzi by an unknown composer was a coronation polonaise for Polish kings.

During the 16th century, mostly two musical groups – both based in Kraków and belonging to the King and Archbishop of Wawel – led the rapid innovation of Polish music. Composers writing during this period include Wacław z Szamotuł, Mikołaj Zieleński, and Mikołaj Gomółka. Diomedes Cato, a native-born Italian who lived in Kraków from about the age of five, became one of the most famous lutenists at the court of Sigismund III. He imported some of the musical styles from southern Europe and blended them with native folk music.

Among the best classical modern composers are Polish musicians Grażyna Bacewicz, Witold Lutosławski, Krzysztof Penderecki and Henryk Górecki.

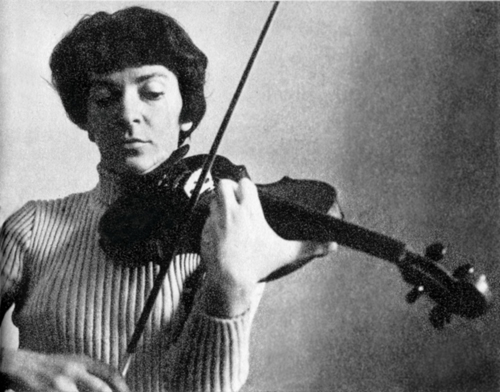
Wanda Wilkomirska

The Polish world renown virtuosos of classical music of all time include composers Karol Lipiński, Artur Rubinstein, Ignacy Paderewski, Mieczysław Horszowski, Grażyna Bacewicz, Wanda Wilkomirska and Krystian Zimerman.

Jazz musician Krzysztof Komeda was known after WWII especially for his film soundtracks, including film directed by Roman Polański, but also for his 1966 album Astigmatic.

In the Polish music industry Rap stand out as the most prominent and widely recognized genre. Polish rappers are celebrated for their talents and achievements. Over the years, most Polish rappers stuck to the contemporary rap music, but in the 21st century several new‐generation artists began to diversify into other genres including Trap. Νotable Polish rappers include Magik, Peja and Popek. In terms of Rap, there are many female artists, but none have gained mainstream publicity. Polish contemporary music also consists of disco polo, which is identified as ‘our own,’ local, and Polish with Zenon Martyniuk, the king of the disco polo and co-founder of the legendary Akcent band, achieving massive success through his hit “Przez Twe oczy zielone”, the second most popular Polish song on YouTube with over 100 million views.

Poland has one of the most prominent electronic dance music (EDM) scenes in Europe. One of the biggest record labels of EDM in Poland was Empire Records. The death metal band Vader is considered the most successful Polish Metal act and have gained commercial and critical praise internationally. Their career spans more than three decades with many international tours. They are often seen as an influence for modern Death Metal. Behemoth and Decapitated have found success inside and outside of Poland. Both groups have toured extensively across Europe, America and, in the case of Decapitated, Australia and New Zealand. Recently Indukti, Hate, Trauma, Crionics, Lost Soul and Lux Occulta have started to become well known outside of Poland. There is also an active grindcore, and a vigorous black metals scenes as well, the later led by Graveland, Darzamat, Kataxu, Infernal War and Vesania.

Leading classical composers
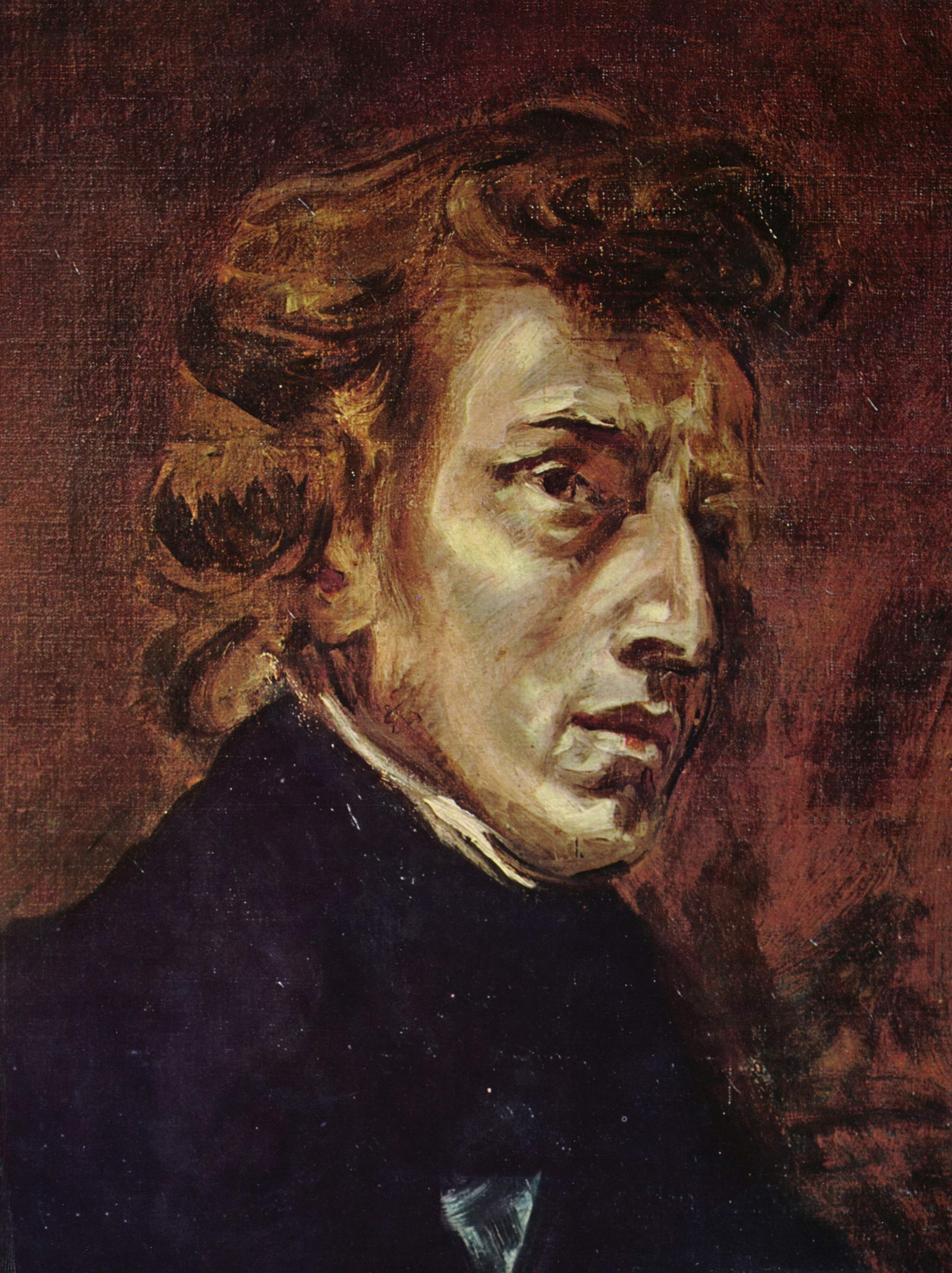
Frédéric Chopin
(1810–1849)

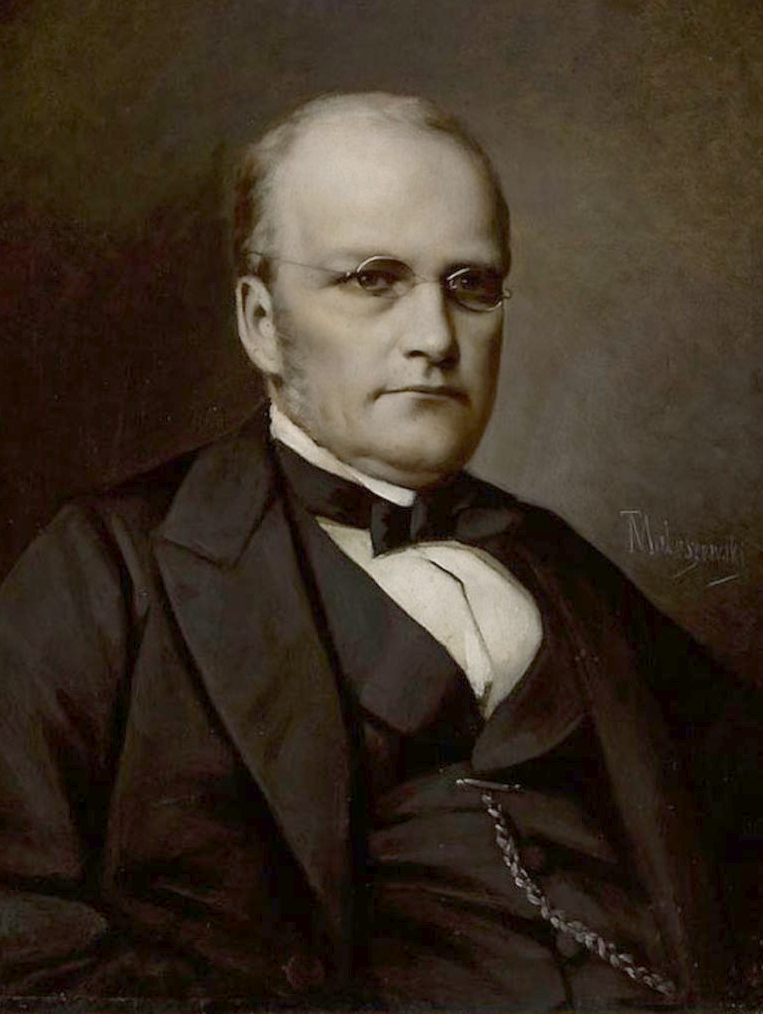
Stanisław Moniuszko
(1819–1872)

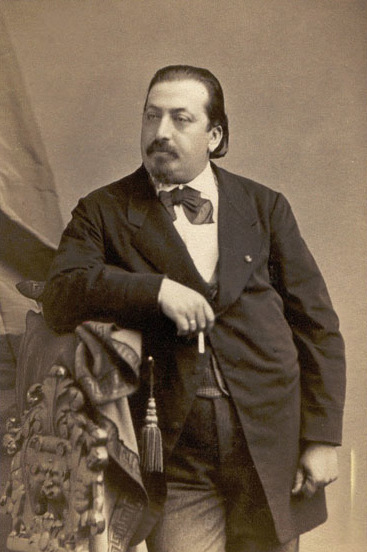
Henryk Wieniawski
(1835–1880)

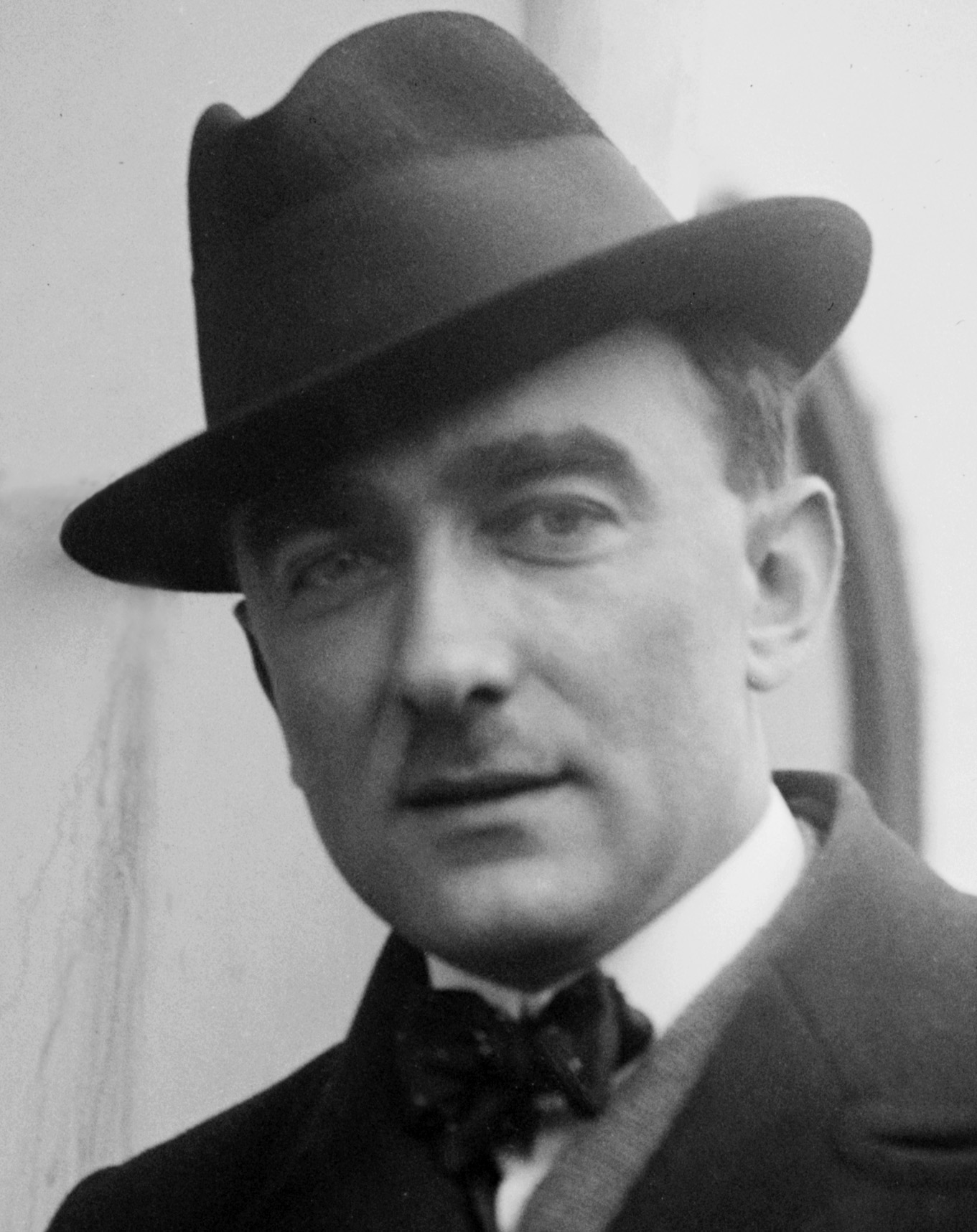
Karol Szymanowski
(1882–1937)
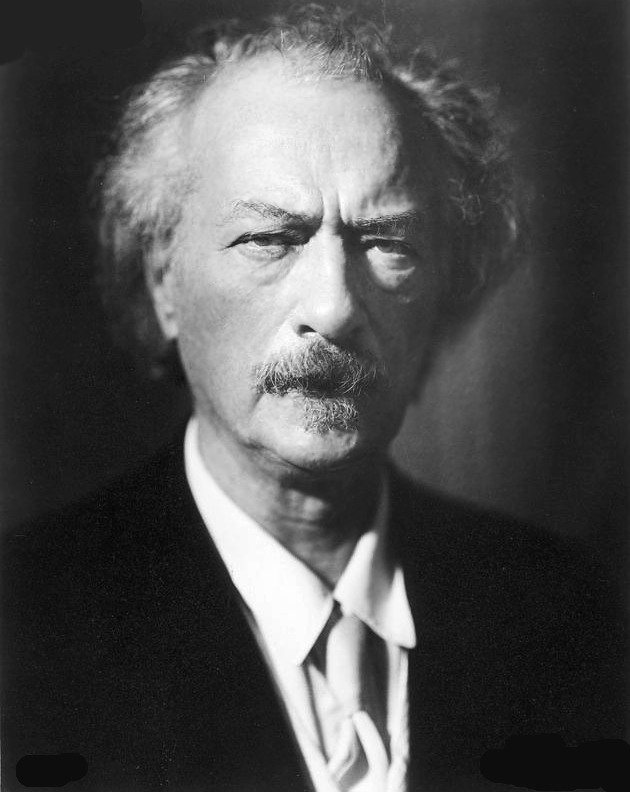
Ignacy Jan Paderewski
(1860–1941)

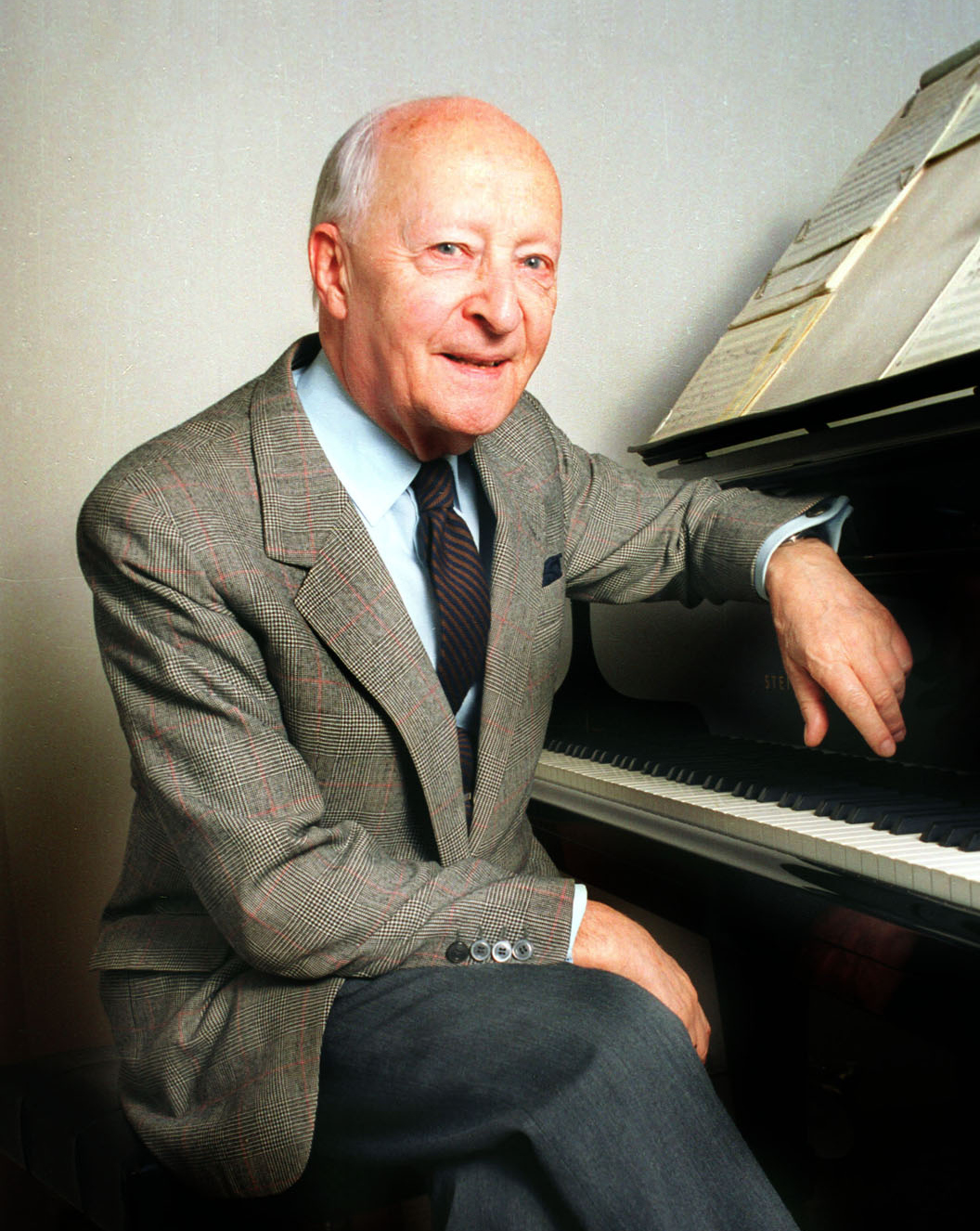
Witold Lutosławski
(1913–1994)

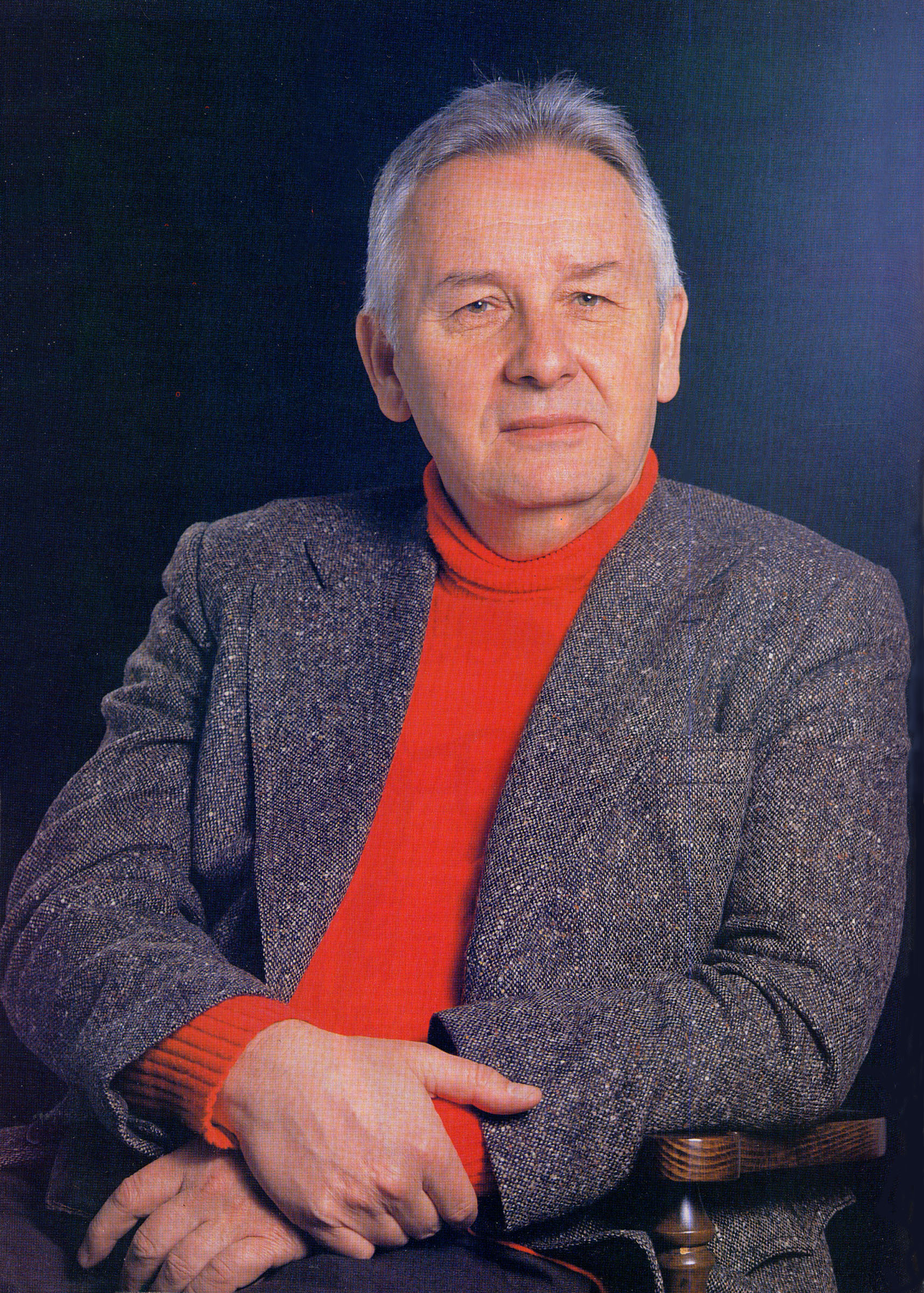
Henryk Górecki
(1933–2010)

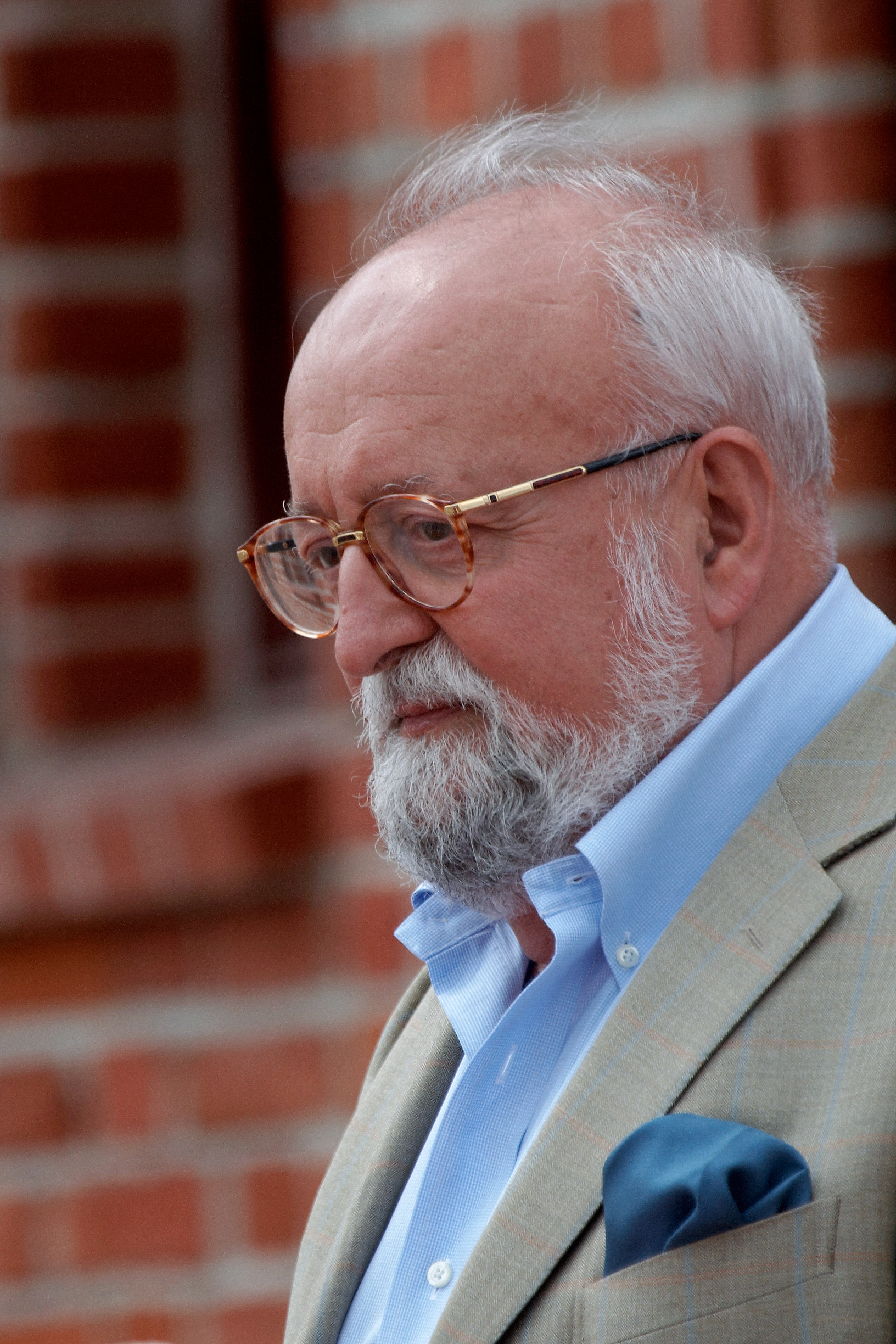
Krzysztof Penderecki
(1933–2020)

== Literature ==
Since the arrival of Christianity and the subsequent access to Western European civilization, Poles developed a significant literary production in Latin. Conspicuous authors of the Middle Ages are among others Gallus Anonymus, Wincenty Kadłubek and Jan Długosz, an author of the monumental work on the history of Poland. With the arrival of the Renaissance, Poles came under the influence of the artistic patterns of the humanistic style, actively participating in the European issues of that time with their Latin works.

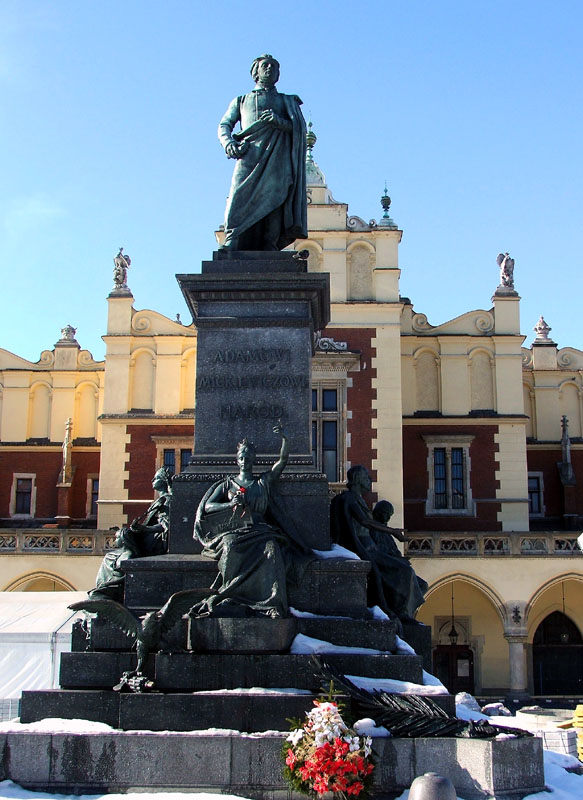
Monument to Adam Mickiewicz, one of the greatest Polish poets, at the Main Market Square in Kraków

The origins of Polish literature written in Polish go back beyond the 14th century. In the 16th century the poetic works of Jan Kochanowski established him as a leading representative of European Renaissance literature. Baroque and Neo-Classicist belle letters made a significant contribution to the cementing of Poland's peoples of many cultural backgrounds. The early 19th century novel "Manuscrit trouvé à Saragosse" by Count Jan Potocki, which survived in its Polish translation after the loss of the original in French, became a world classic. Wojciech Has's film based on it, a favourite of Luis Buñuel, later became a cult film on university campuses. Poland's great Romantic literature flourished in the 19th century when the country had lost its independence. The poets Adam Mickiewicz, Juliusz Słowacki and Zygmunt Krasiński, the "Three Bards", became the spiritual leaders of a nation deprived of its sovereignty, and prophesied its revival. The novelist Henryk Sienkiewicz, who won the Nobel Prize in 1905, eulogised the historical tradition. It is difficult to grasp fully the detailed tradition of Polish Romanticism and its consequences for Polish literature without a thorough knowledge of Polish history.

In the early 20th century, many outstanding Polish literary works emerged from the new cultural exchange and Avant-Garde experimentation. The legacy of the Kresy marshlands of Poland's eastern regions with Wilno and Lwów (now Vilnius and Lviv) as two major centres for the arts, played a special role in these developments. This was also a region in which Jewish tradition and the mystic movement of Hasidism thrived. The Kresy were a cultural trysting-place for numerous ethnic and national groups whose achievements were inspiring each other. The works of Bruno Schulz, Bolesław Leśmian, and Józef Czechowicz were written there. In the south of Poland, Zakopane was the birthplace of the avant-garde works of Stanisław Ignacy Witkiewicz (Witkacy). And, last but not least, Władysław Reymont was awarded the 1924 Nobel prize in literature for his novel Chłopi (The Peasants).

After the Second World War, many Polish writers found themselves in exile, with many of them clustered around the Paris-based "Kultura" publishing venture run by Jerzy Giedroyc. The group of emigre writers included Witold Gombrowicz, Gustaw Herling-Grudziński, Czesław Miłosz, and Sławomir Mrożek.

Zbigniew Herbert, Tadeusz Różewicz, Czesław Miłosz, and Wisława Szymborska are among the most outstanding 20th century Polish poets, including novelists and playwrights Witold Gombrowicz, Sławomir Mrożek, and Stanisław Lem (science fiction). The long list includes Hanna Krall whose work focuses mainly on the war-time Jewish experience, and Ryszard Kapuściński with books translated into many languages.

Leading Polish writers and poets
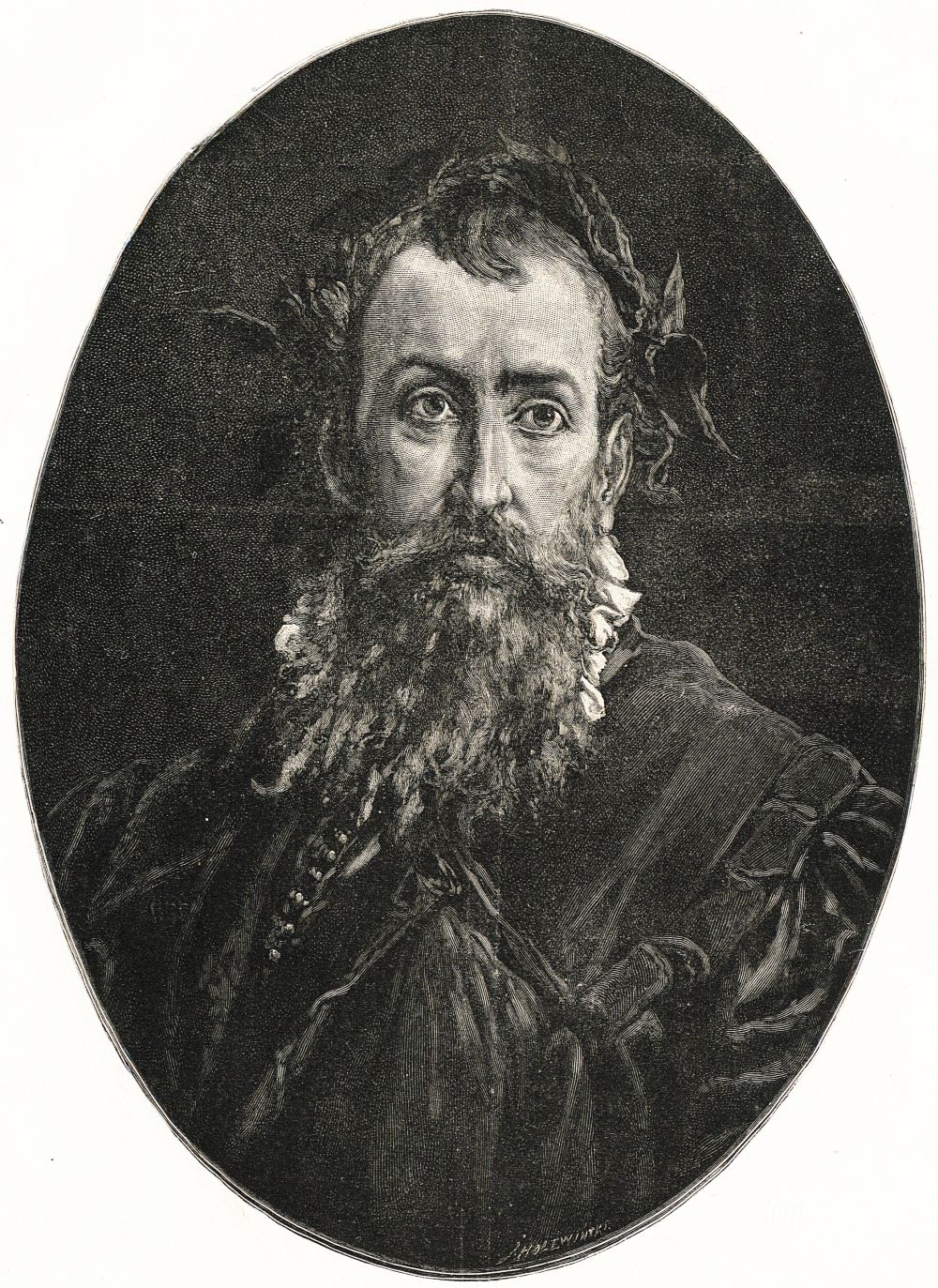
Jan Kochanowski
(1530–1584)

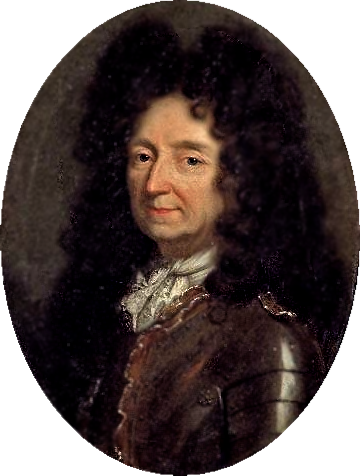
Jan Andrzej Morsztyn
(1621–1693)

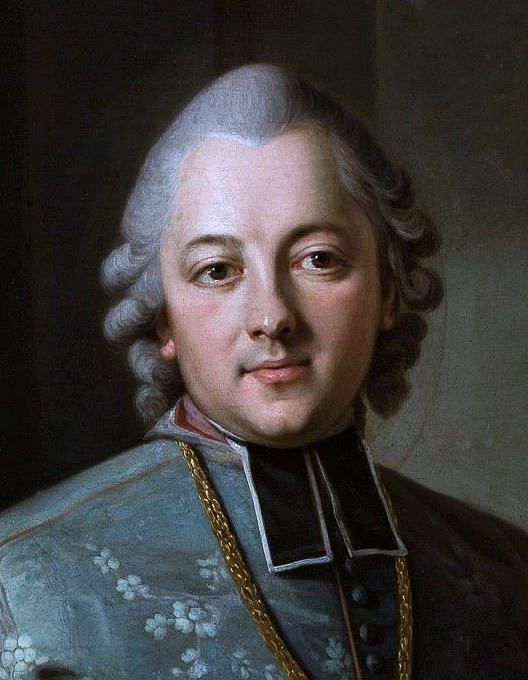
Ignacy Krasicki
(1735–1801)

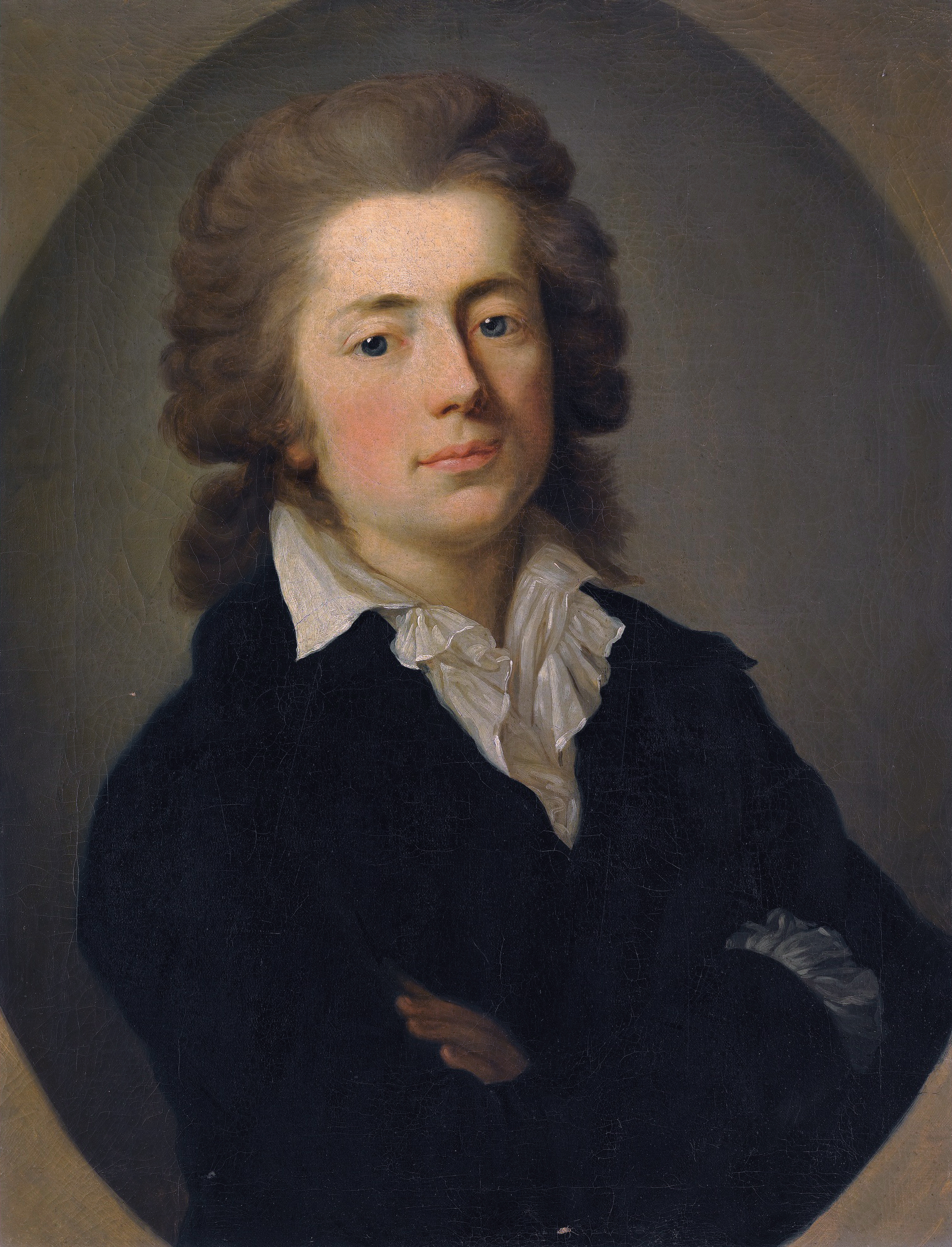
Jan Potocki
(1761–1815)
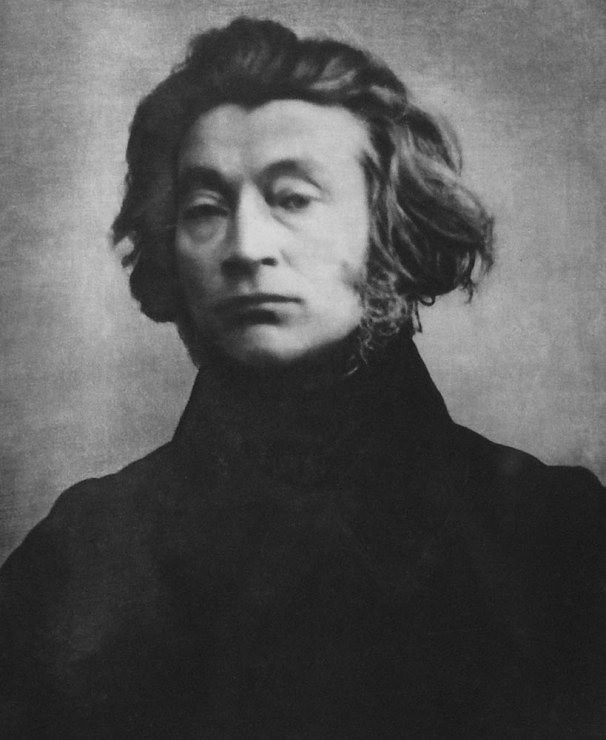
Adam Mickiewicz
(1798–1855)

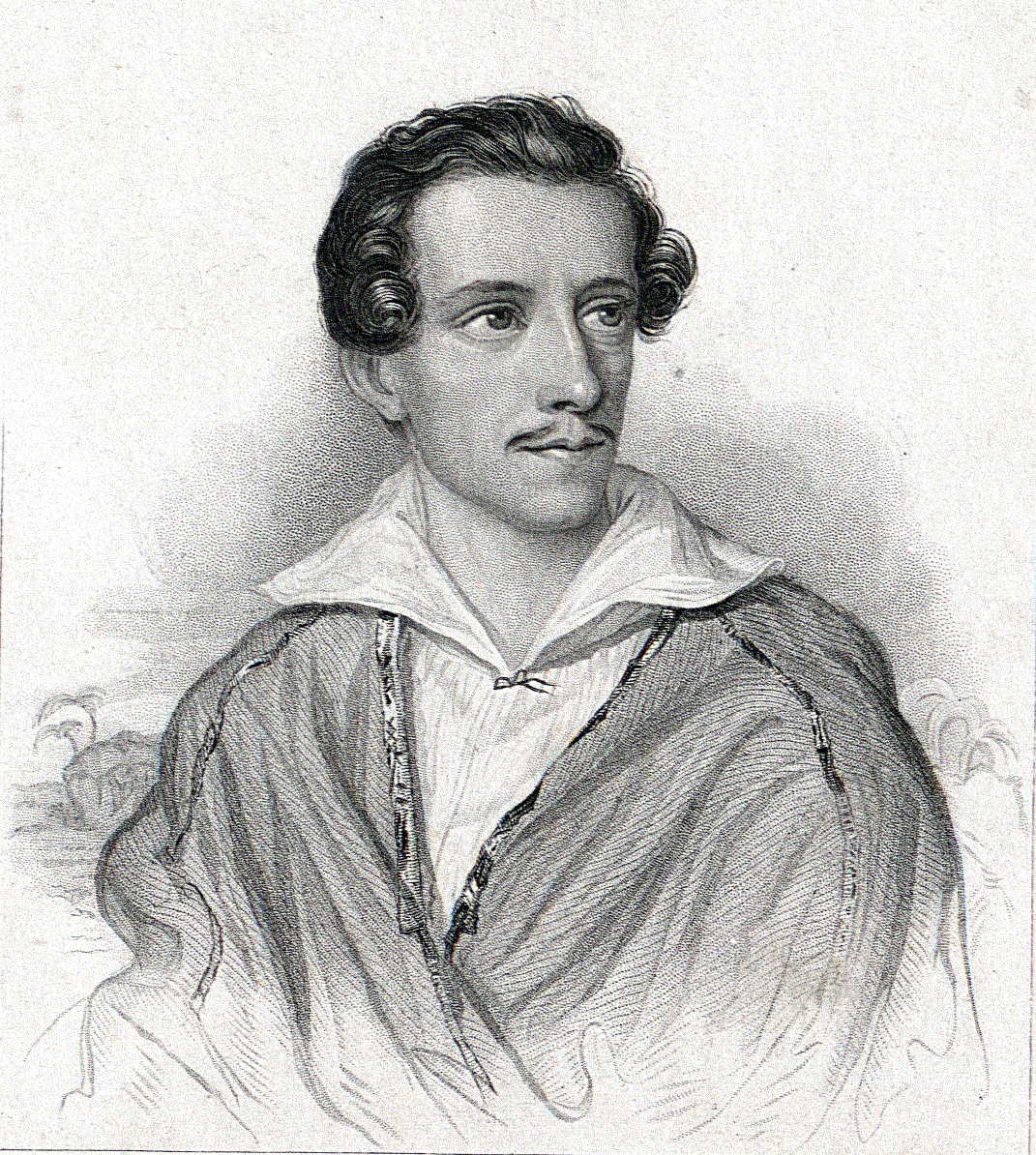
Juliusz Słowacki
(1809–1849)

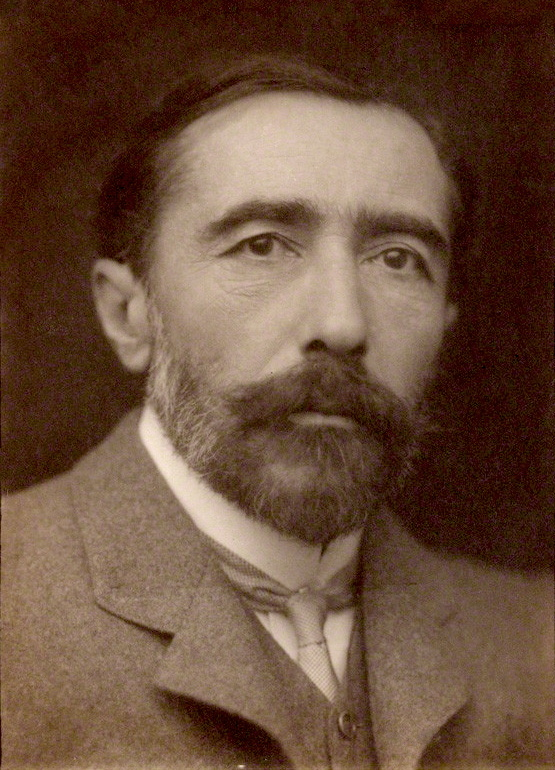
Joseph Conrad
(1857–1924)

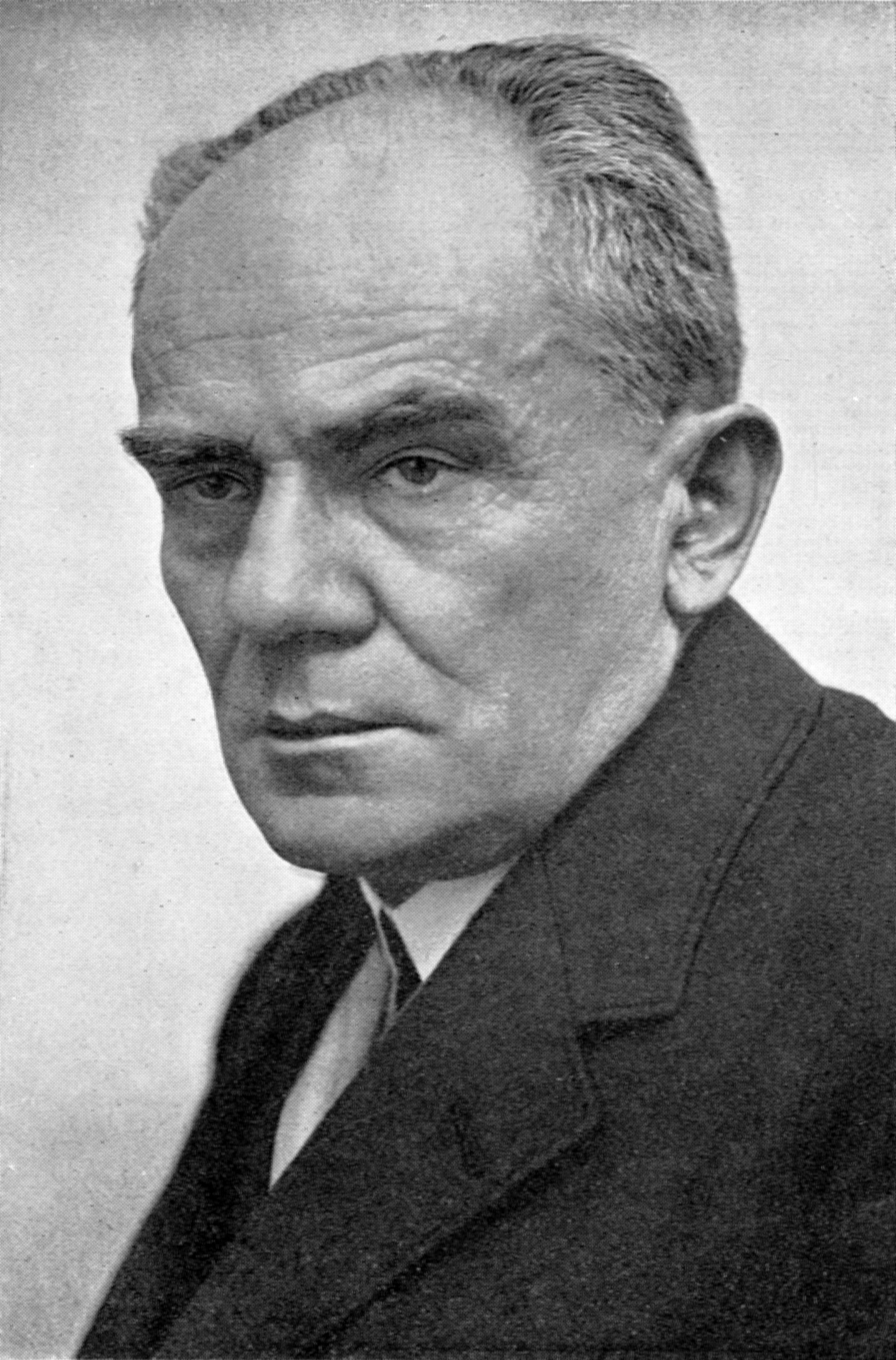
Stefan Żeromski
(1864–1925)
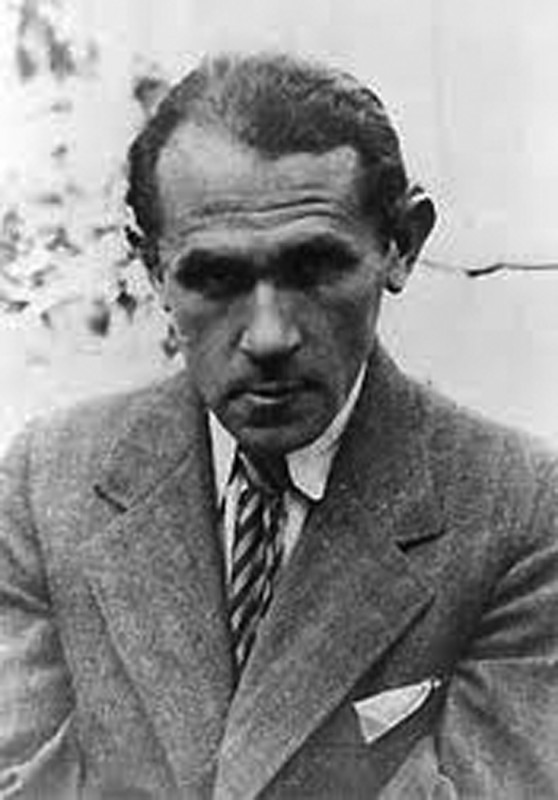
Bruno Schulz
(1892–1942)

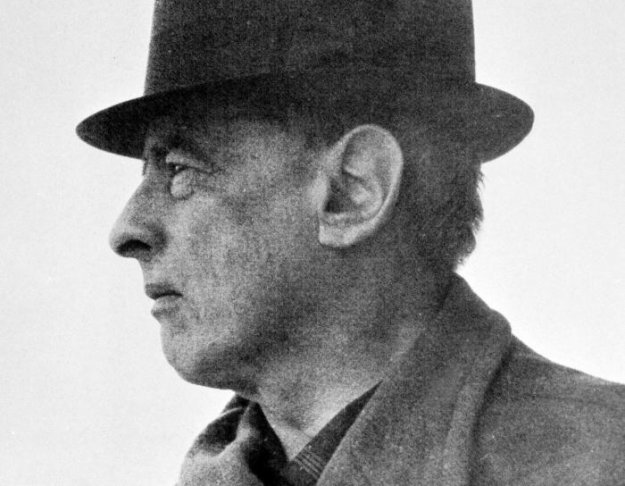
Witold Gombrowicz
(1904–1969)

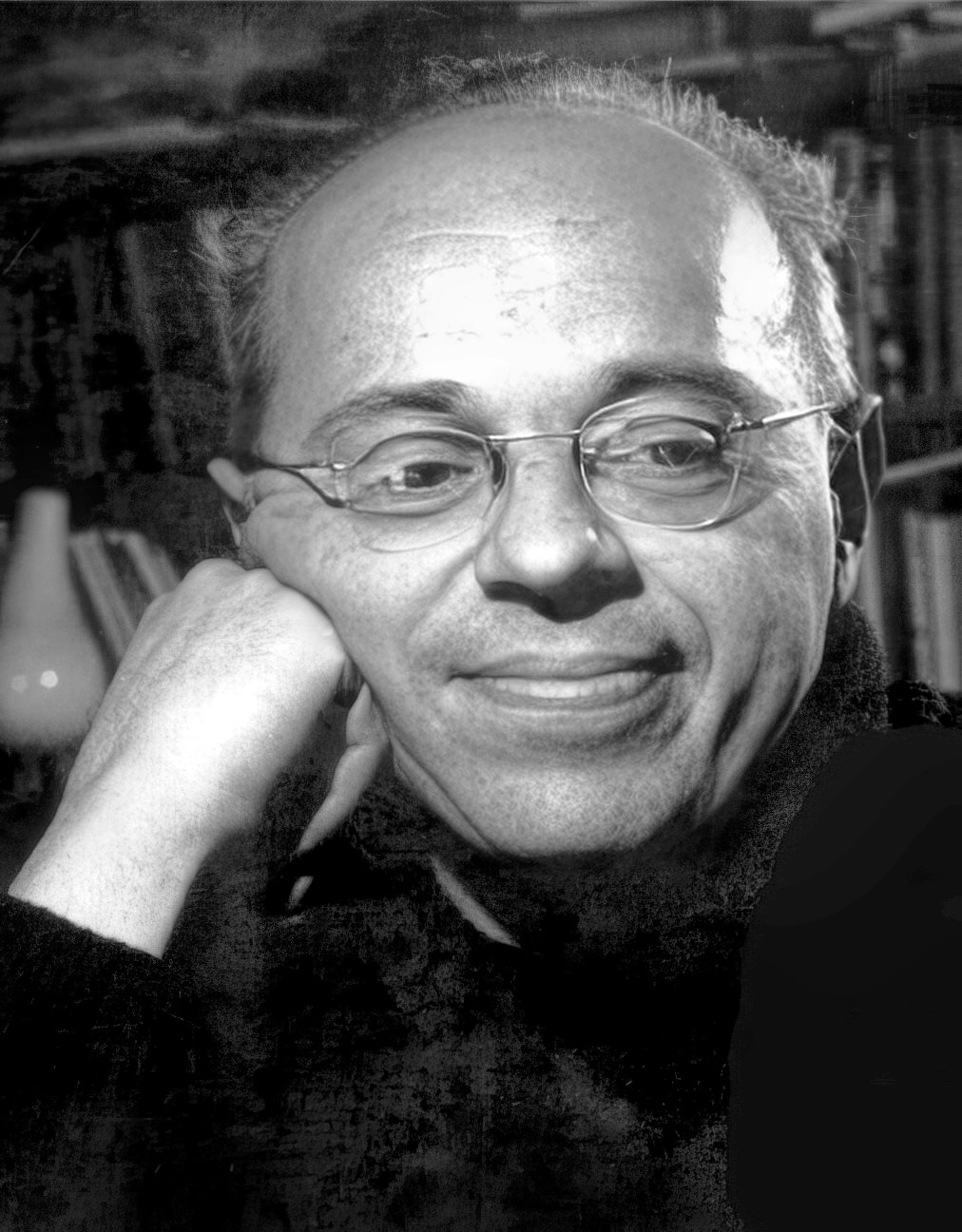
Stanisław Lem
(1921–2006)

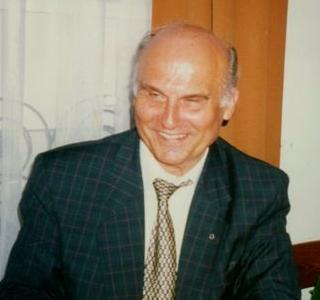
Ryszard Kapuściński
(1932–2007)

Henryk Sienkiewicz (1846–1916)	Władysław Reymont (1865–1925)	Isaac Bashevis Singer (1902–1991)	Czesław Miłosz (1911–2004)	Wisława Szymborska (1923–2012)	Olga Tokarczuk (1962–)

== Philosophy ==
Polish philosophy drew upon the broader currents of European philosophy, and in turn contributed to their growth. Among the most momentous Polish contributions were made, in the 13th century, by the Scholastic philosopher and scientist Vitello, by Paweł Włodkowic—in early 15th and, by the Renaissance polymath Nicolaus Copernicus in the 16th century.

Subsequently, the Polish–Lithuanian Commonwealth partook in the intellectual ferment of the Enlightenment, which for the multi-ethnic Commonwealth ended not long after the partitions and political annihilation that would last for the next 123 years, until the collapse of the three partitioning empires in World War I.

The period of Messianism, between the November 1830 and January 1863 Uprisings, reflected European Romantic and Idealist trends, as well as a Polish yearning for political resurrection. It was a period of maximalist metaphysical systems.

The collapse of the January 1863 Uprising prompted an agonising reappraisal of Poland's situation. Poles gave up their earlier practice of "measuring their goals by their aspirations" (Adam Mickiewicz) and buckled down to hard work and study. "[A] Positivist," wrote the novelist Bolesław Prus's friend, Julian Ochorowicz, was "anyone who bases assertions on verifiable evidence; who does not express himself categorically about doubtful things, and does not speak at all about those that are inaccessible."

The 20th century brought a new quickening to Polish philosophy. There was growing interest in western philosophical currents. Rigorously trained Polish philosophers made substantial contributions to specialized fields—to psychology, the history of philosophy, the theory of knowledge, and especially mathematical logic. Jan Łukasiewicz gained world fame with his concept of many-valued logic and his "Polish notation." Alfred Tarski's work in truth theory won him world renown.

After World War II, for over four decades, world-class Polish philosophers and historians of philosophy such as Władysław Tatarkiewicz continued their work, often in the face of adversities occasioned by the dominance of a politically enforced official philosophy. The phenomenologist Roman Ingarden did influential work in esthetics and in a Husserl-style metaphysics; his student Karol Wojtyła owned a unique influence on the world stage as Pope John Paul II.

Leading Polish philosophers
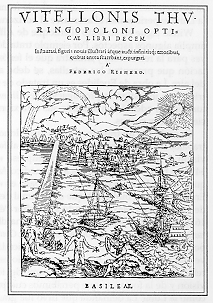
Vitello
(1230–1280/1314)

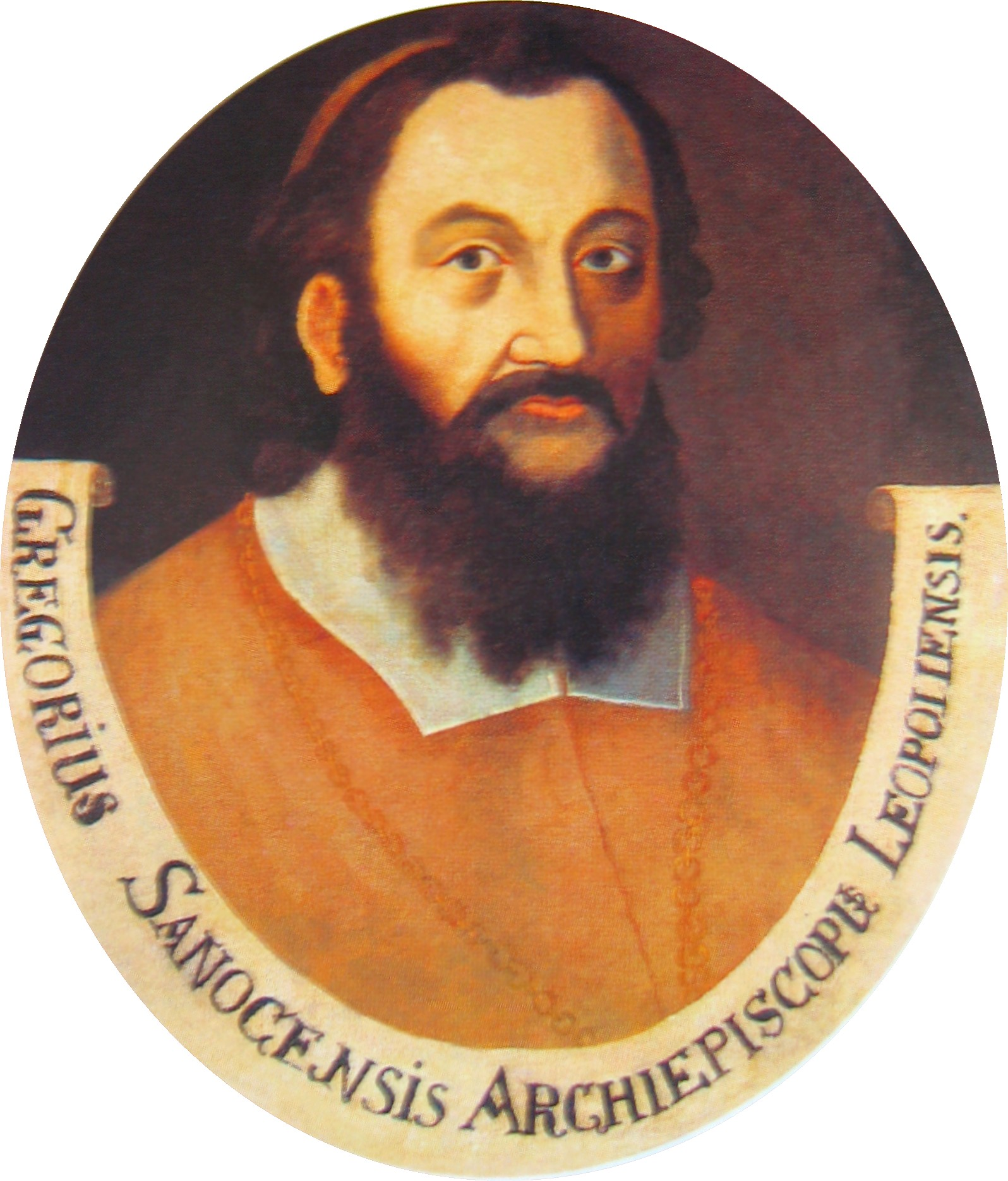
Gregory of Sanok
(1403/1407–1477)

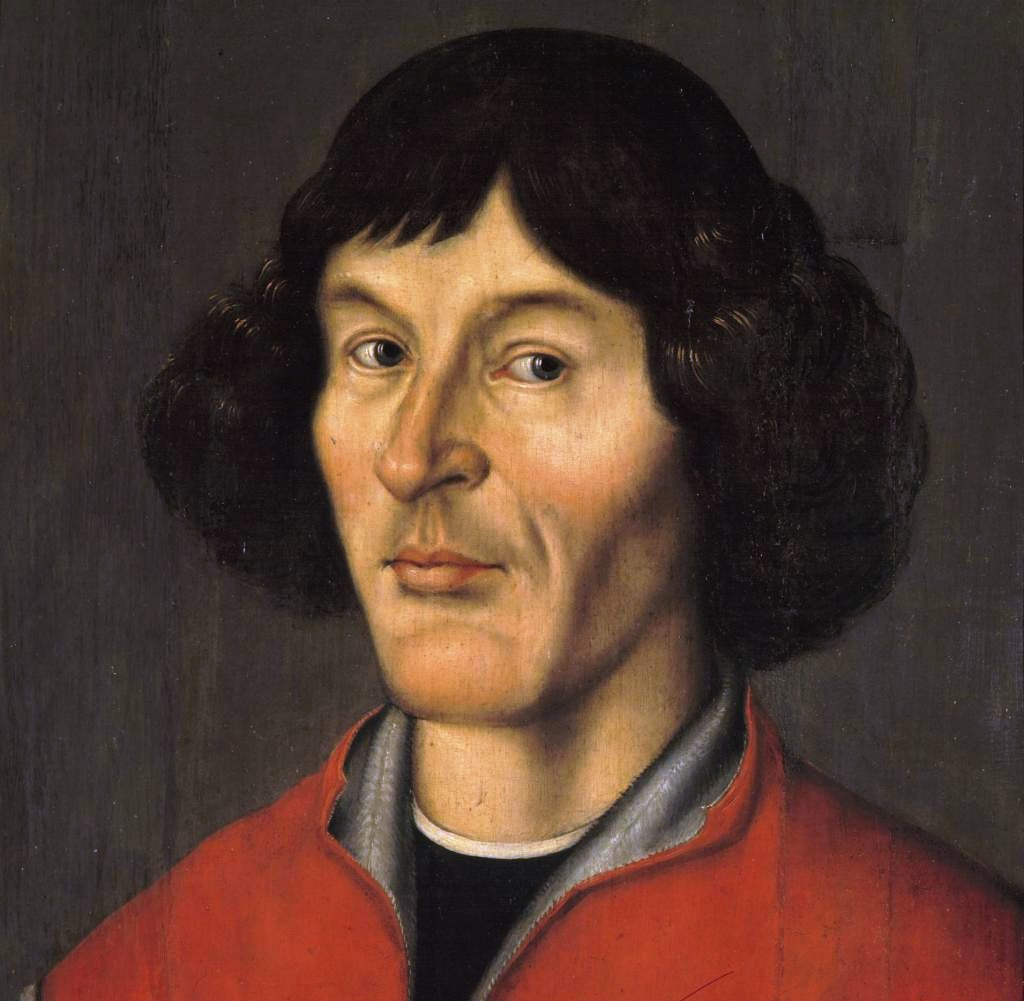
Nicolaus Copernicus
(1473–1543)

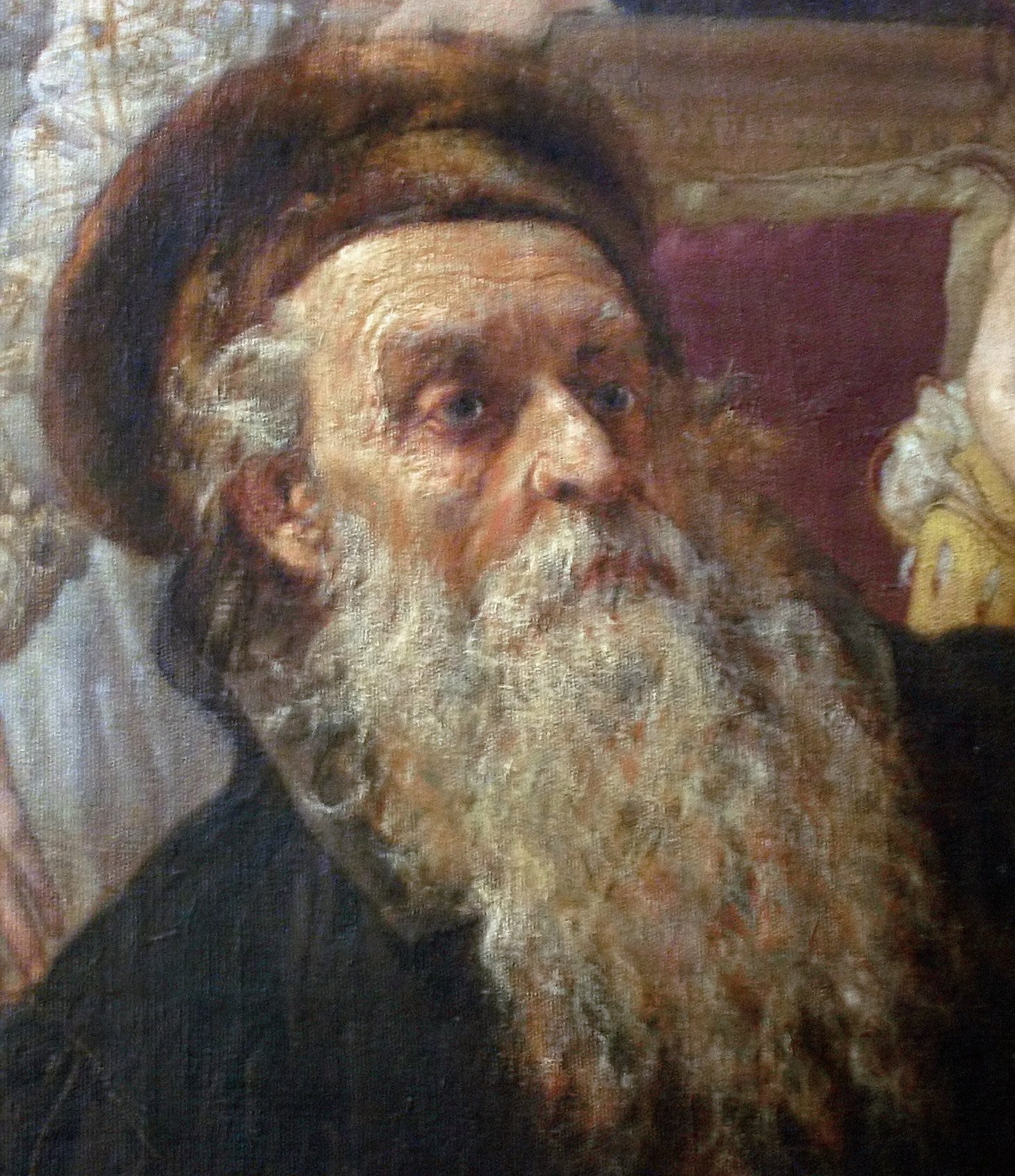
Frycz Modrzewski
(1503–1572)
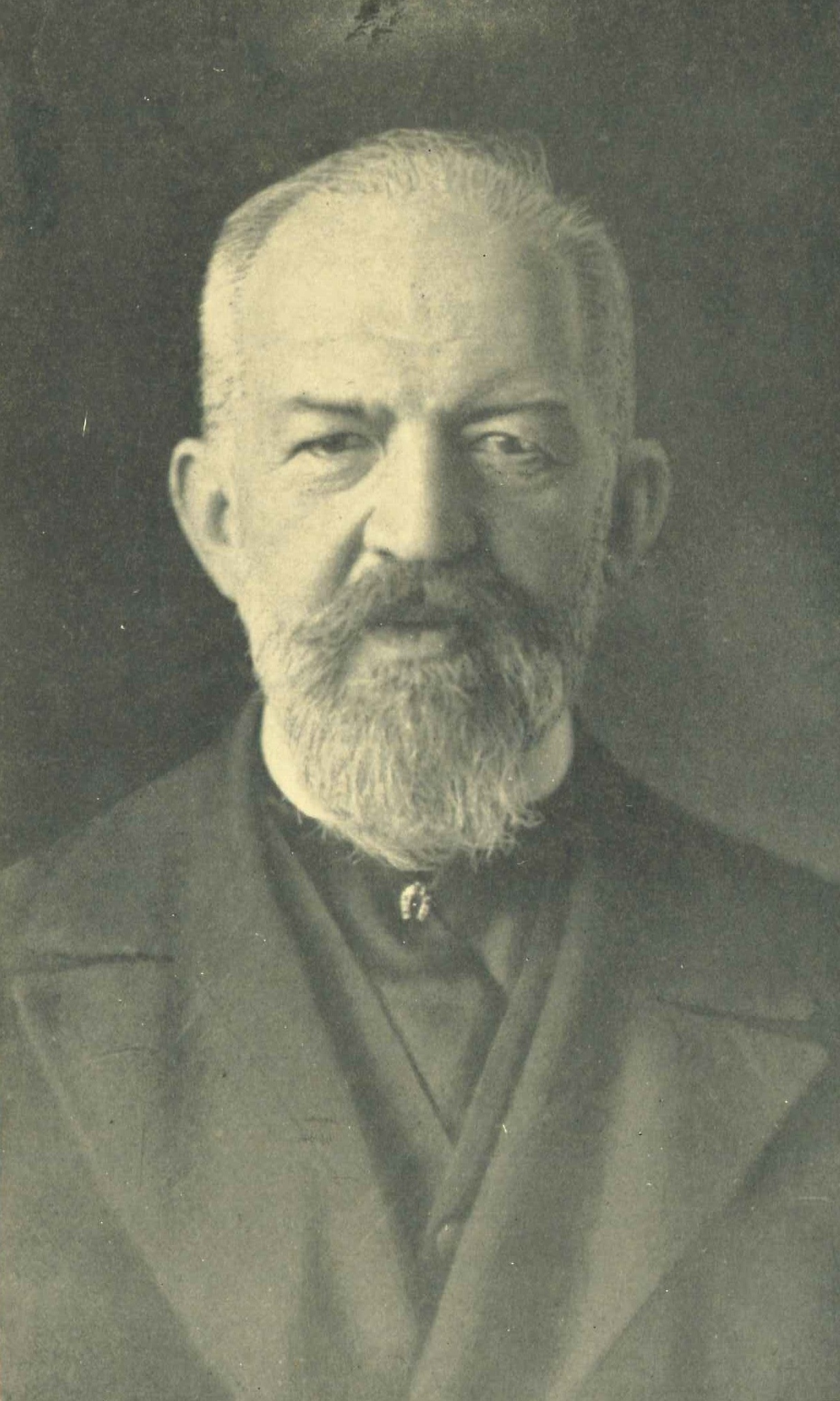
Lwów–Warsaw school
(1895–1920/1930)

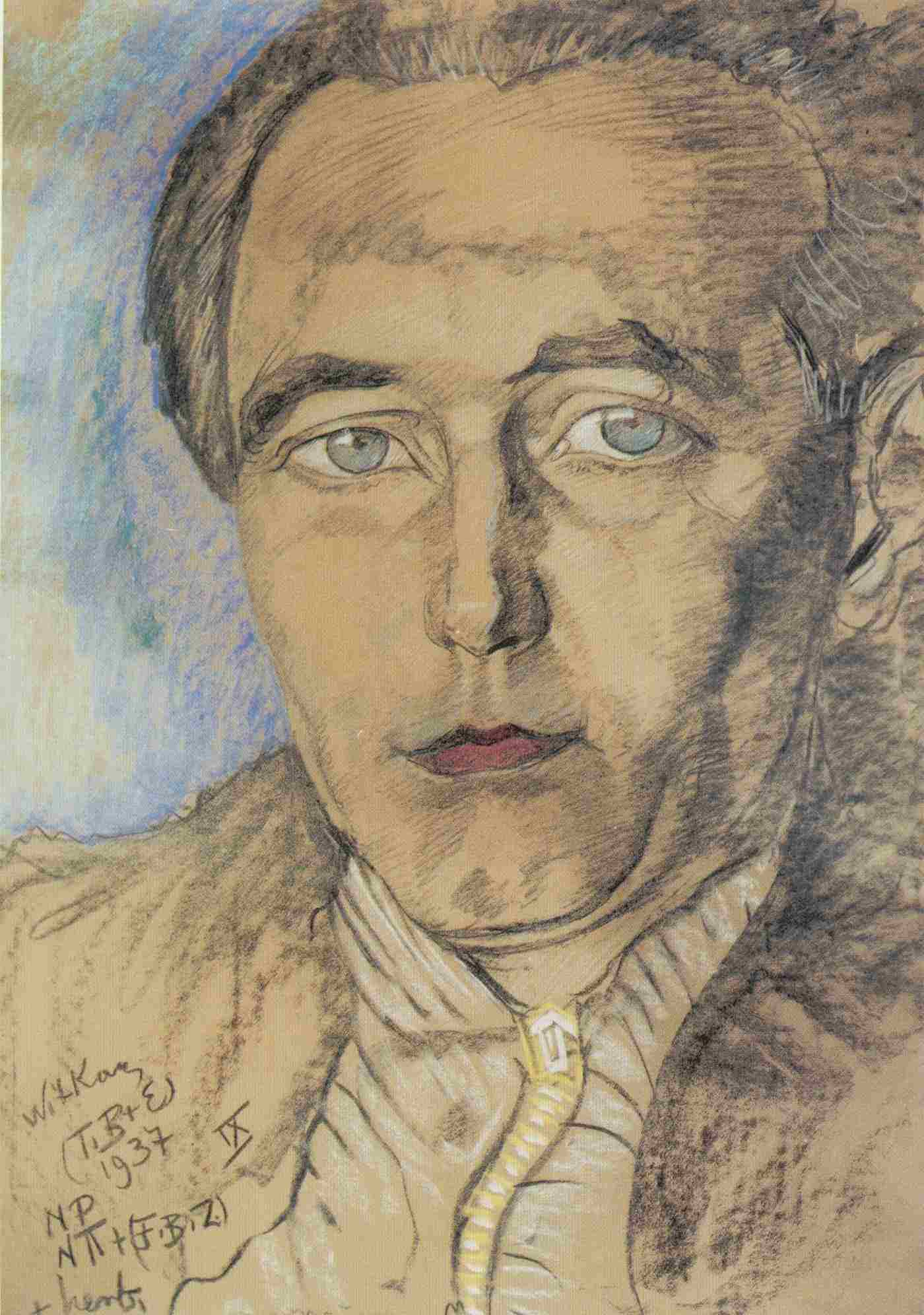
Roman Ingarden
(1893–1970)

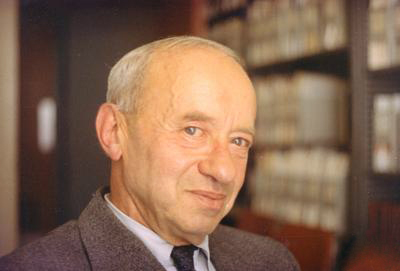
Alfred Tarski
(1901–1983)

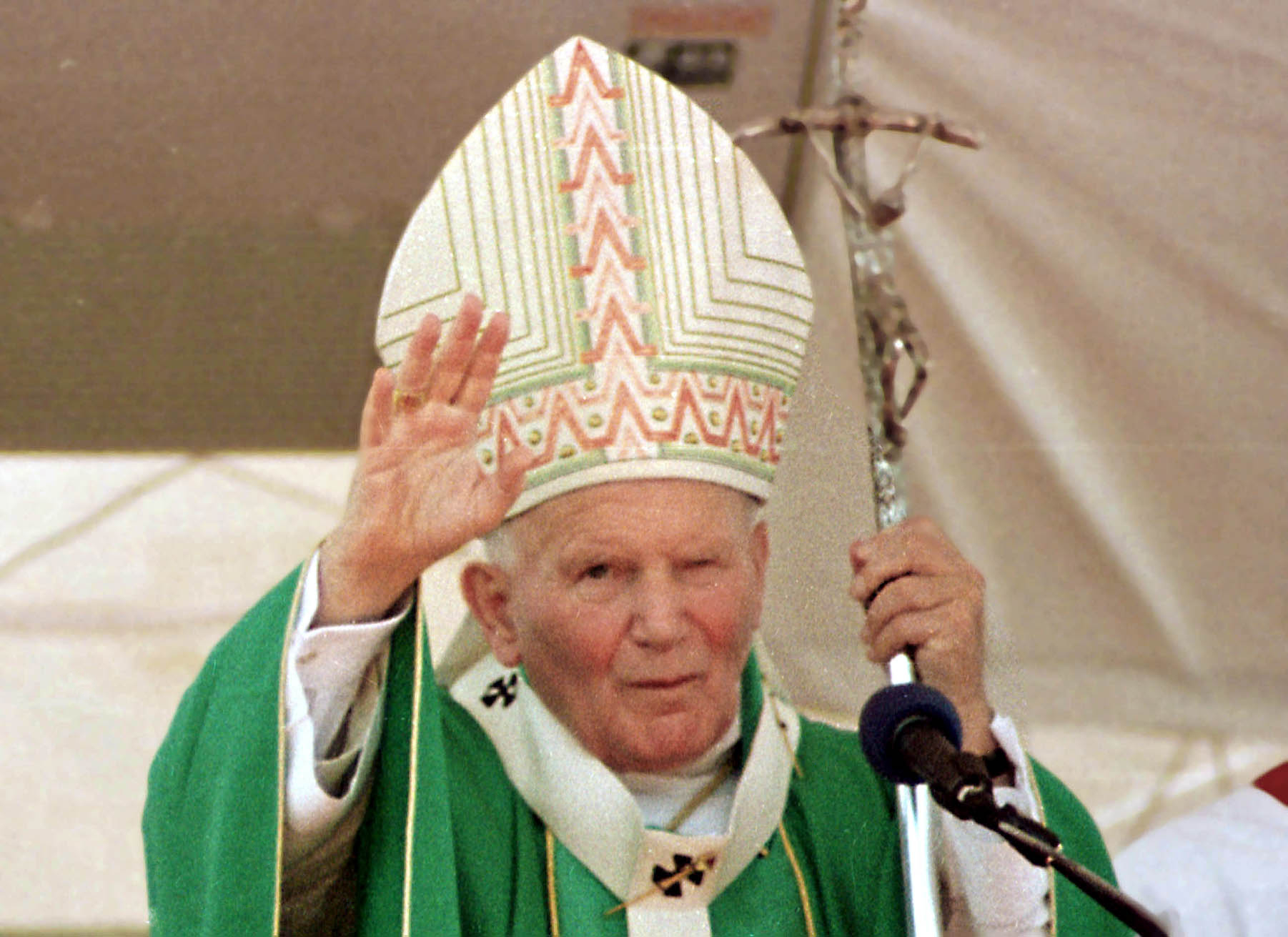
Pope John Paul II
(1920–2005)

== See also ==
- Religion in Poland
- Education in Poland
- Polish comics
- Timeline of Polish science and technology
- Economy of Poland
- Politics of Poland
  - Foreign relations of Poland
- Tourism in Poland
  - Seven Wonders of Poland
  - World Heritage Sites of Poland
- Sport in Poland
- National costumes of Poland
  - Category:Polish clothing
- Category:Polish traditions
  - Polish folk dances
  - Wigilia
  - Pasterka
  - Święconka
  - Pisanka (Polish)
  - Easter Monday
  - Fat Thursday
  - Name days in Poland
  - Studniówka
  - Juwenalia
  - Zaduszki

== Gallery ==
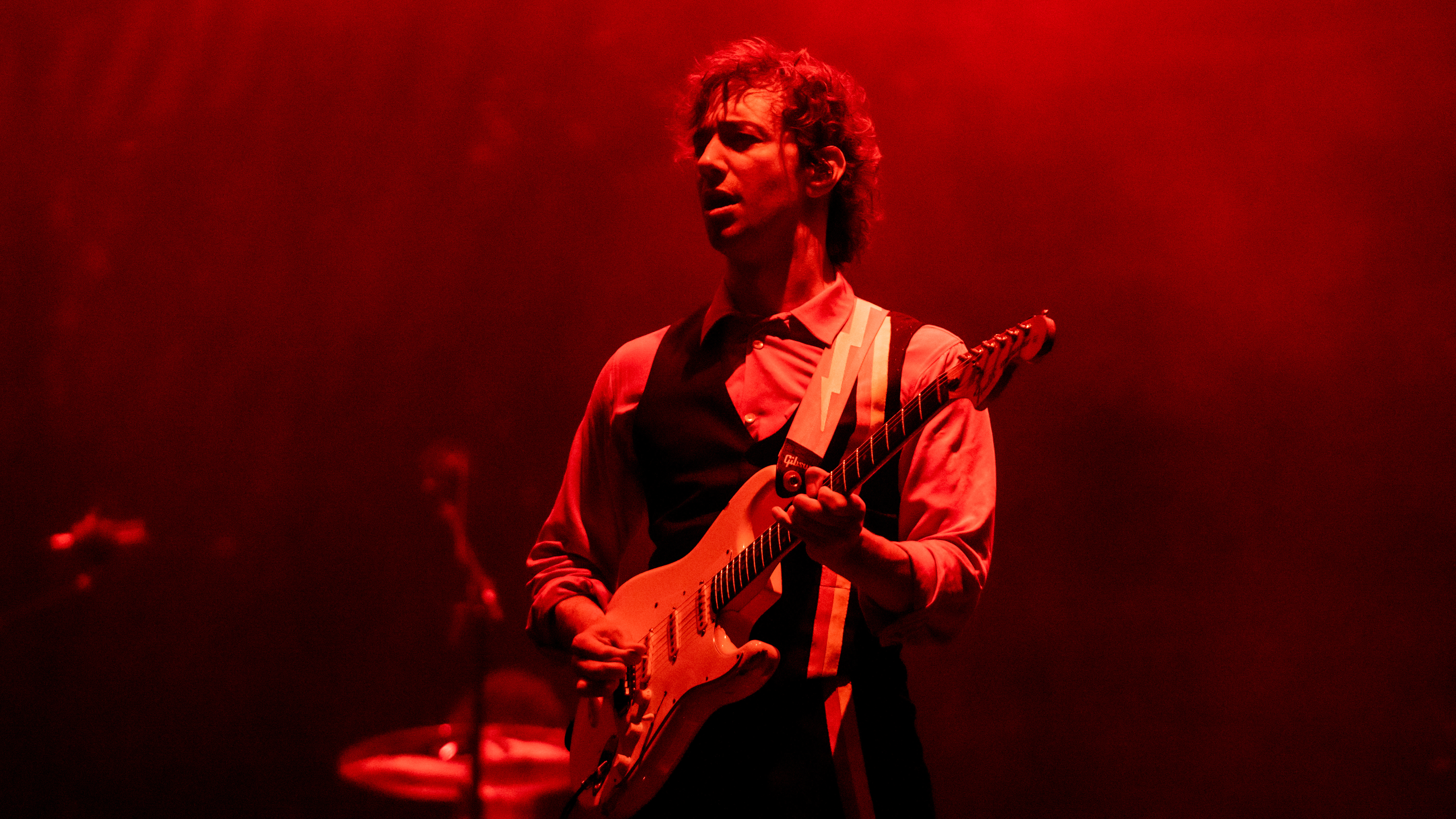
Open'er Festival in Gdynia is one of the biggest annual music festivals in Poland

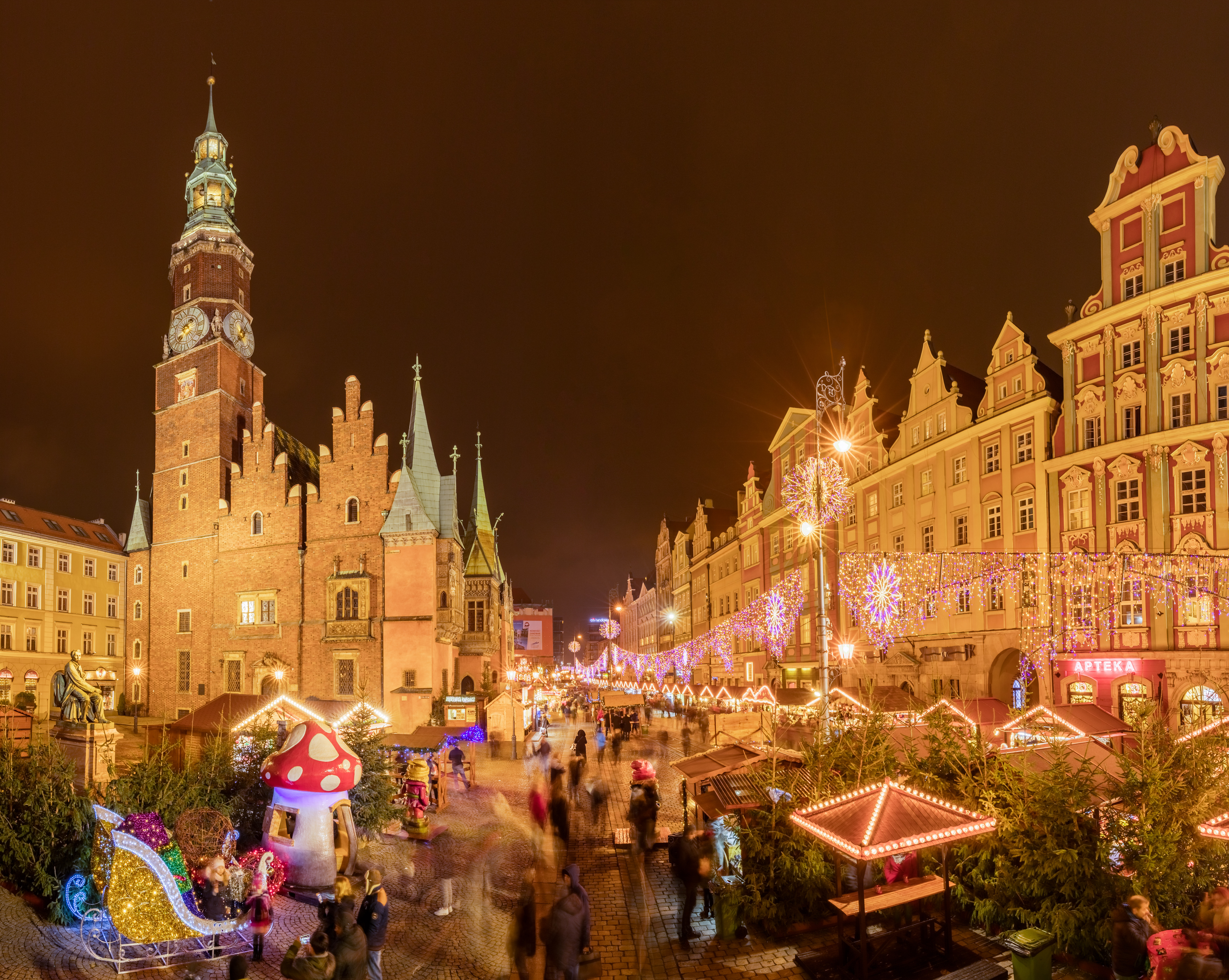
Christmas market in Wrocław

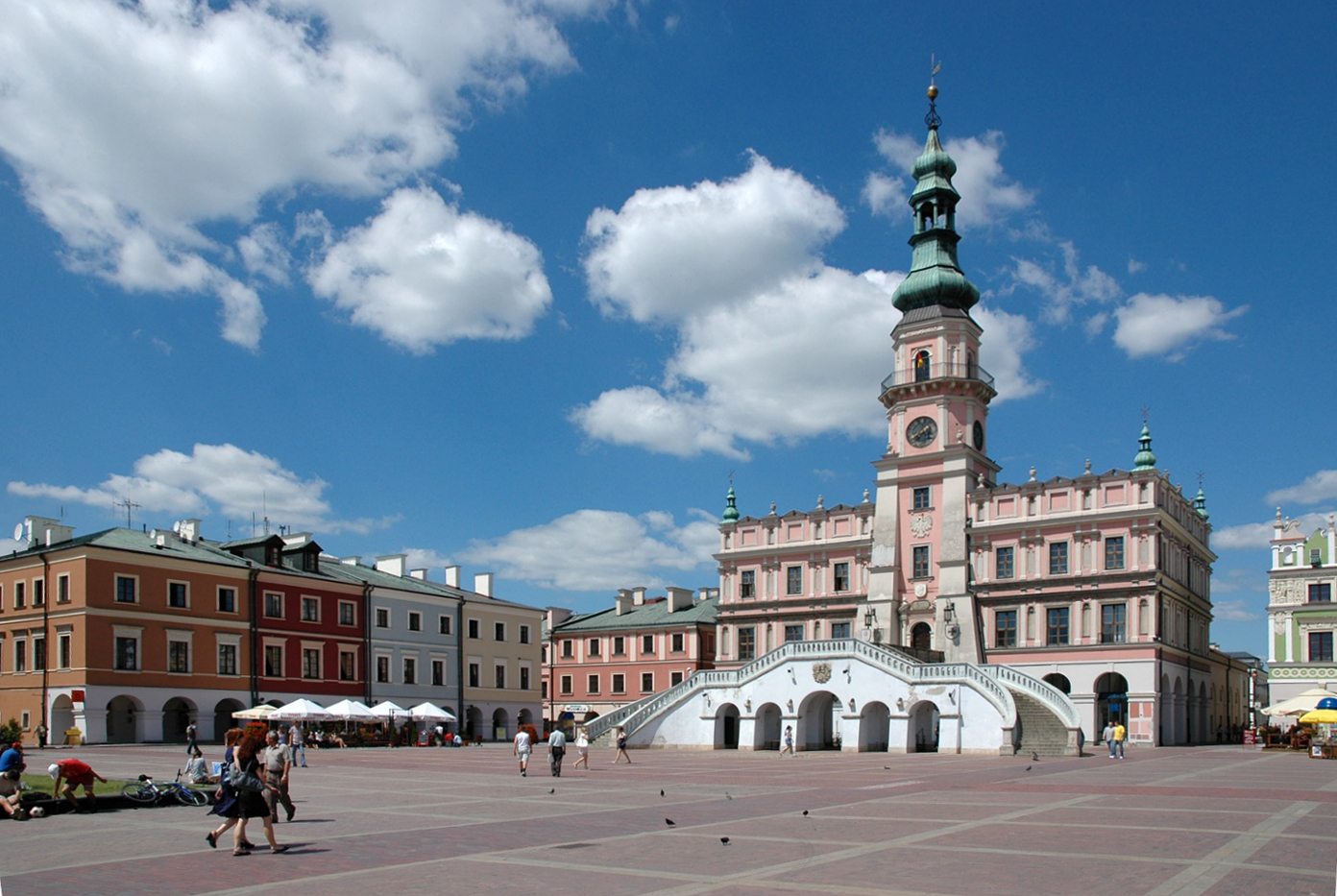
Old Town of Zamość (UNESCO World Heritage Site)

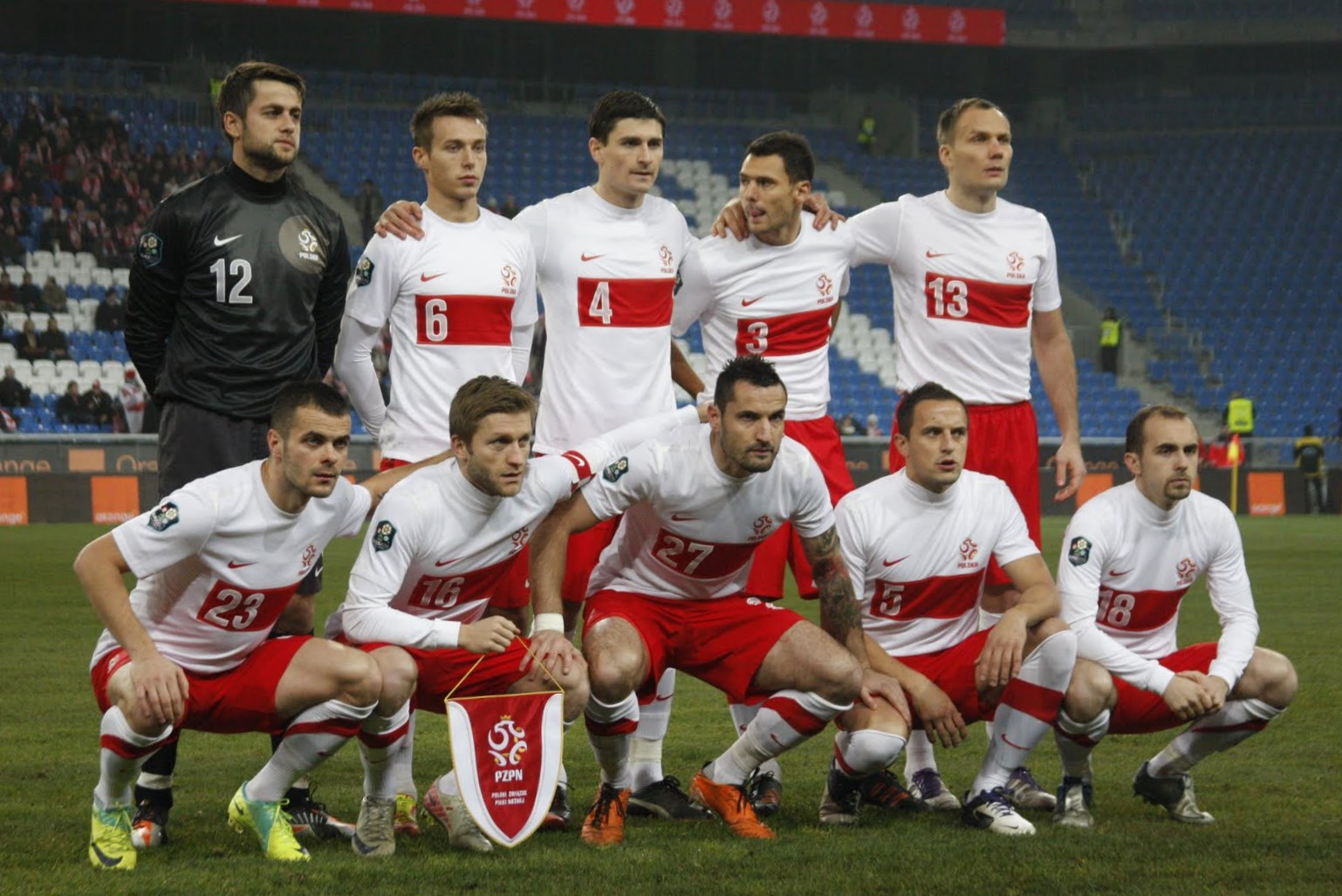
Poland national football team
