= Kujawiak =

Polish folk dance from Kuyavia

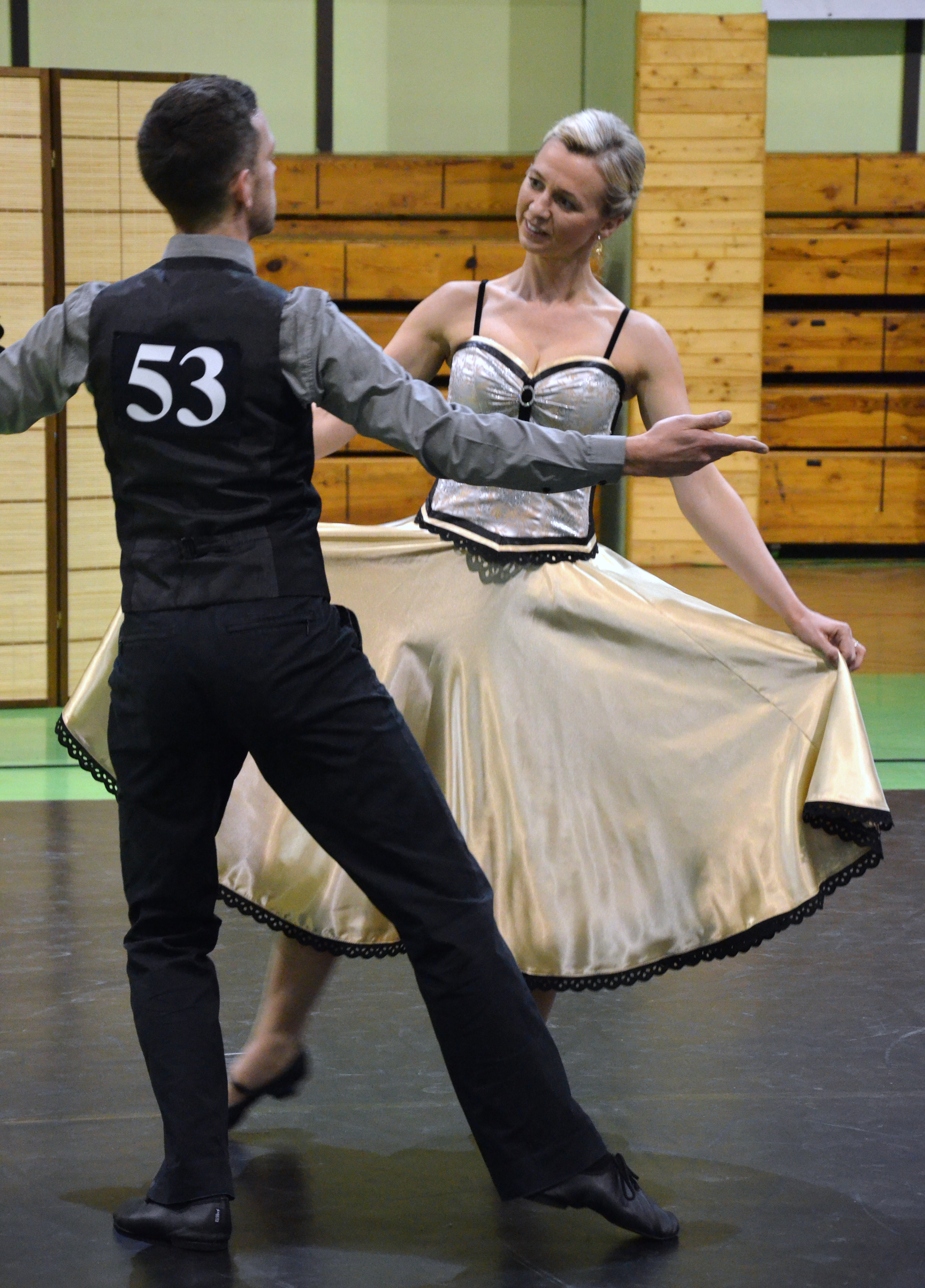
A modern couple performing the Kujawiak in a competition setting.

The kujawiak is a Polish folk dance from the region of Kuyavia (Kujawy) in central Poland. It is one of the five national dances of Poland, the others being the krakowiak, mazur, oberek, and polonaise.

The music is in triple meter, and is characterized by its rubato tempo and calm, lyrical nature. The dance typically involves couples walking gracefully in a quarter-note rhythm, on slightly bended knees, with relaxed turns, around a circle.

== History ==
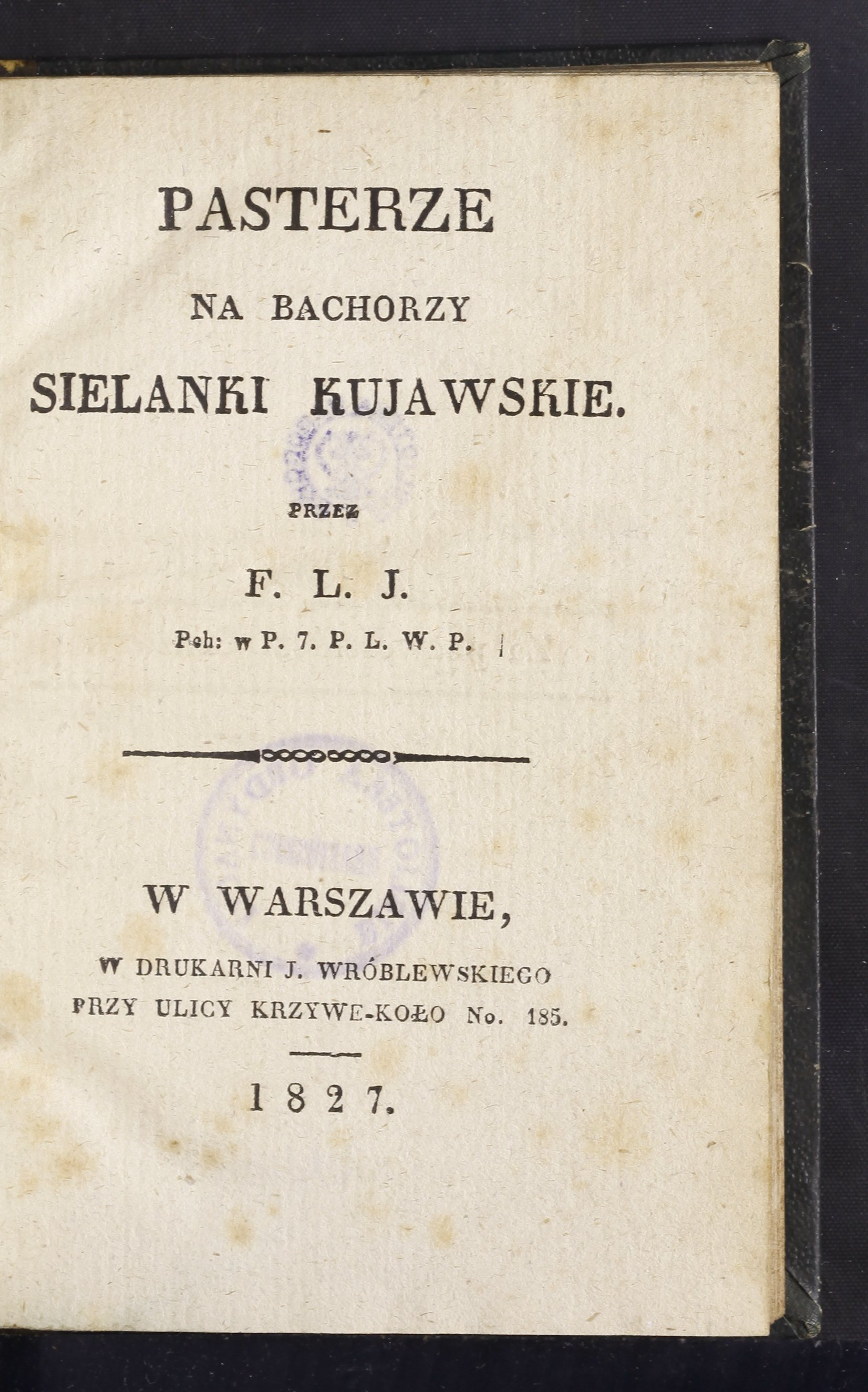
The first appearance of the name 'Kujawiak', found in Pasterze na Bachorzy Sielanki Kujawskie.

The name "kujawiak", as a reference to the dance, first appeared in 1827, in T.F. Jaskólski's composition Pasterze na Bachorzy. Sielanki Kujawskie. It is argued that the dance was developed from the mazur between 1750 and 1830.

In 1841, Leon Zienkowicz described the kujawiak as a "regional variety of the mazurka relying on the domination of the minor key". The majority of the composers in the years following, including Ignacy Dobrzyński, Edward Łodwigowski, Kazimierz Łada, Ignacy Komorowski, Wojciech Osmański, and Henryk Wieniawski, agreed with this interpretation, and treated the musical features like the rhythms and tempos of the kujawiak and the oberek as a "single entity".

The kujawiak involved much collaboration between dancers and musicians in olden times. The dancer would request a specific tune by singing it to the band, often filling lyrical lines with "dana, dana" as an imitation of the sound of an instrument. The first fiddler would then guess how to play the tune from the gestures and movements of the dancer, and the dancer would give the musicians some money. Throughout the dance, the first fiddler would need to watch the dancer's movements closely in order to follow their desired changes in music and tempo – if the musicians were able to follow the dancers well, they were considered a good band, and were paid well and invited back for more dances.

Though the dance began in the villages and peasantry, it was embraced by the landed gentry and nobility due to its beauty. They collected and published Kujawiak melodies, and invited the village musicians and dancers to their manors to learn the dance. Through this back-and-forth of the nobility learning and improvising upon the traditional steps and the peasants adopting the improvisations, the kujawiak was thus incorporated into the elegant parties and fancy balls of the upper class towards the end of the 1860s. From there, the dance moved to festivities in big cities like Warsaw, and spread all over Poland.

As the dance grew in popularity, it also grew in embellishments, taking on alternating tempos, show-off steps, and new figures. It was adopted as a Polish national dance at the end of the 19th century.

In 1990, Czesław Sroka published Polskie tańce narodowe – systematyka (Polish National Dances: A Typology). This publication included a standardized set of kujawiak components, in which the Council of Experts of Folklore determined the precise number of ten positions for pairs, fifteen types of steps, eleven ornaments, and eleven figures for the kujawiak.

== Description ==
=== Dance ===
The kujawiak was originally danced "with a calm dignity and simplicity, in a smooth flowing manner “reminiscent of the tall grain stalks in the fields swaying gently in the wind". The dancers would perform in pairs, whirling along a circle, led by a leader or leading pair. It was commonly danced during weddings and village dance parties.

The kujawiak exists in two forms: as a regional folk dance inclusive of its many variants, and as a unified "national dance". For both, it is characterized by its rotations of couples, shifting around a large, circular dance space. The folk versions are faster and more complicated than its national counterpart.

Kujawiak was originally often performed as a suite of three dances called "okrągły", meaning round. The dances were each of a different tempo, yet all featured the mazurka rhythm and a triple meter. The kujawiak was preceded by fifteen to thirty minutes of a slow walking dance, like the chodzony, with partners holding each other by their sides and outlining the dancing area. The proper kujawiak followed, accelerating the tempo. The suite ended with a quick turning dance, the mazurek or the oberek. In some regions, the order of dances might be reversed (mazur-kujawiak-oberek) with a decelerating tempo.

Folk dances grouped under the label of kujawiak have different names depending on the figures they use:

- Ksebka (to oneself) - with turns to the left
- Odsibka (from oneself) - turns to the right
- Gładki (smooth)
- Owczarek (shepherd)
- Okrągły (round)

Guidelines for dancing the kujawiak are taken from Ada Dziewanowska's Polish Folk Dances and Songs as follows:

"Kujawiak should be danced with simple dignity and with due attention to one's partner. Head and torso should remain uplifted, shoulders down, knees relaxed. Free hand(s) should be either gracefully extended diagonally down to the sides and slightly forward (woman may hold her skirt) or placed on the front part of own hip(s) either in fist(s) or with fingers forward and thumb back, with wrist(s) straight and elbow(s) slightly forward".

The kujawiak's steps are performed on relaxed, slightly bent knees, with toes placed on the floor first before the rest of the foot. The dance features both closed and open dance positions. Ornamental steps should not be repeated too many times throughout a sixteen-measure phrase; rather, they should be unexpected embellishments in the dance's chain of events. While a man performs an ornamental step, his female partner uses small, flat steps, and adapts her dancing to the steps he chooses.

=== Music ===
The kujawiak is characterized by its sentimental, melancholic melody. This quality is created by its minor key, and use of "plaintively sounding" minor thirds.

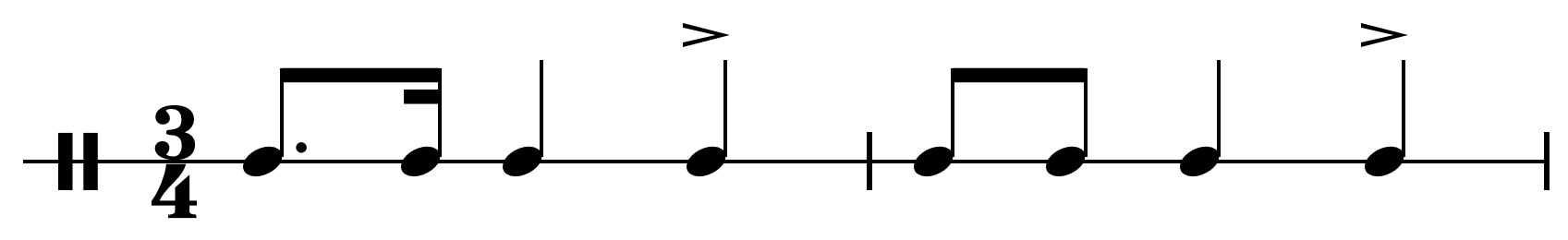
The mazurka rhythm, used in the kujawiak.

The dance begins with an introductory pattern of repeated pitches with a unique accelerating rhythm, showing the dancers the exact tempo of the following dance. The kujawiak is in triple meter. It has two mazur symmetrical four-measure phrases, with the second part of each measure often extended and accented. Performers often extend measures of the melody, creating its characteristic rubato tempo. These phrases further frequently end on the dominant. This creates a feeling of "unendingness" and suspense.

A Kujawy folk band typically had one or two violins, a bass, and sometimes a clarinet and a small drum (a bebenek). Bagpipes called the dudy were also used. The violin would perform the main melody. It was accompanied by a basy, a low-pitched bowed instrument with two strings, as a percussion instrument. The basy's percussive rhythm in the accompaniment was emphasized the use of a drum. Modern instrumental ensembles in the Kujawy area include clarinet, accordion, flutes, and other instruments.

=== Costume ===
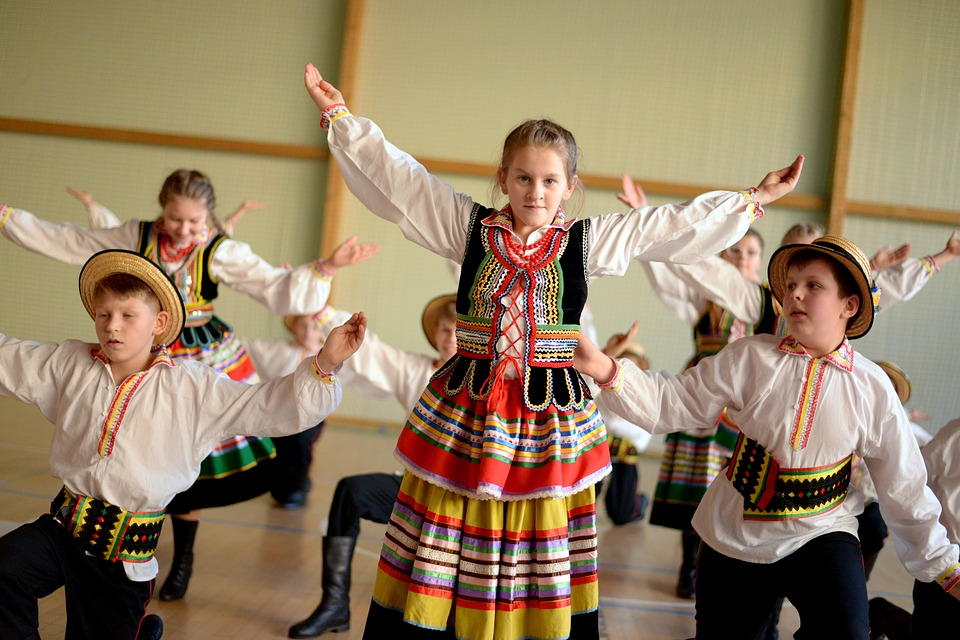
Children performing the kujawiak.

The kujawiak is often performed in the Lowicz costume on stage, with many colorful, woven patterns and ornate embroidery. The colorful stripes on the women's skirts and aprons and the men's pants, called pasiak, represent the farmers' fields.

The folk costume of the Kujawiak men consists of a long navy coat called a sukmana with a large collar, broad blue pants, boots, a wide belt, high boots, and a square hat lined with fur called a rogatywka.

Women wore navy jackets with a small cape around their shoulders, flowery skirts with an apron in a contrasting color, and a red scarf tied as a tight turban around the head.

Contemporary groups add ornaments, and use thinner fabrics and less layers.

== Examples in art music ==
- 'Kujawiak' by Feliks Nowowiejski, published in 1912 (choral piece)
- 'Kujawiak in A minor' by Henryk Wieniawski, published in 1853 (for violin and piano)
- Chopin's Mazurkas, op.6 no.4, op.30 no.4, and op.41 no.1
- Witold Maliszewski - Fantasie Kujawiak for Piano and Orchestra Op.25 (1928)

== See also ==
- List of national dances
- Varsovienne
- Redowa
