= European dances =

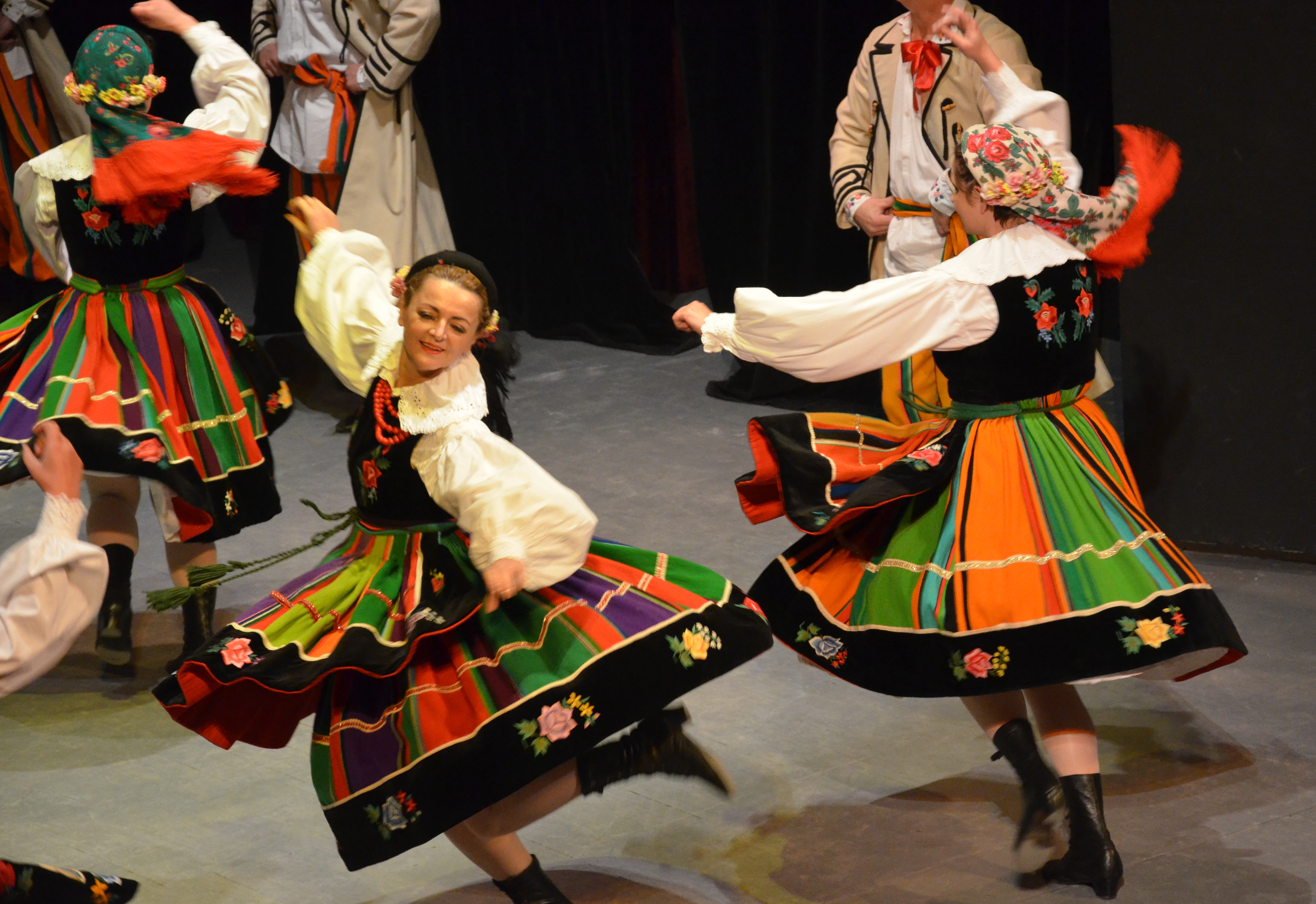
Oberek - traditional polish dance in triple meter

European dances refers to various dances originating in Europe. Since the Middle Ages, many European dances tend to be refined, as some are based on the court dances of aristocrats.

== History ==
In ancient times, European dances were performed as either sacred dances in religious ceremonies or for popular entertainment.

Greek dance included religious worship, education, religious or civil ceremonies and festivities. One famous Greek dance is the dithyramb, in honor of Dionysus.

Originally Rome had exclusively religious dances. As Rome gained dominance, including conquering Greece, more dance traditions were absorbed. The Bacchanalia and Lupercalia festivals highlight the importance of dance in Rome.

Under Christianity, dance fell under the control and condemnation of the Church. Records of Medieval dance are fragmented and limited, but a noteworthy dance reference from the medieval period is the allegory of the Danse Macabre.

During the Renaissance, dance became more diverse. Country dances, performed for pleasure, became distinct from court dances, which had ceremonial and political functions.

Ballet (French: [balɛ]) is a type of performance dance that originated during the Italian Renaissance in the fifteenth century and later developed into a concert dance form in France and Russia. It has since become a widespread and highly technical form of dance with its own vocabulary. Ballet has been influential globally and has defined the foundational techniques which are used in many other dance genres and cultures.

John Playford's The Dancing Master(1651) listed over a hundred tunes, each with its own figures. This was enormously popular, reprinted constantly for 80 years and much enlarged. Playford and his successors had a practical monopoly on the publication of dance manuals until 1711, and ceased publishing around 1728. During this period English country dances took a variety of forms including finite sets for two, three and four couples as well as circles and squares.

In Germany, from a modified Ländler, the waltz was introduced in all the European courts. Thus, group dance gives way to couples dance.

In the 17th century, the French minuet, characterized by its bows, courtesies and gallant gestures, permeated the European cultural landscape.

In the 19th century, the French can-can (also spelled cancan as in the original French /kɑ̃kɑ̃/) is a high-energy, physically demanding dance that became a popular music-hall dance in the 1840s, continuing in popularity in French cabaret to this day. Originally danced by couples, it is now traditionally associated with a chorus line of female dancers. The main features of the dance are the vigorous manipulation of skirts and petticoats, along with high kicks, splits, and cartwheels.

== National traditions ==
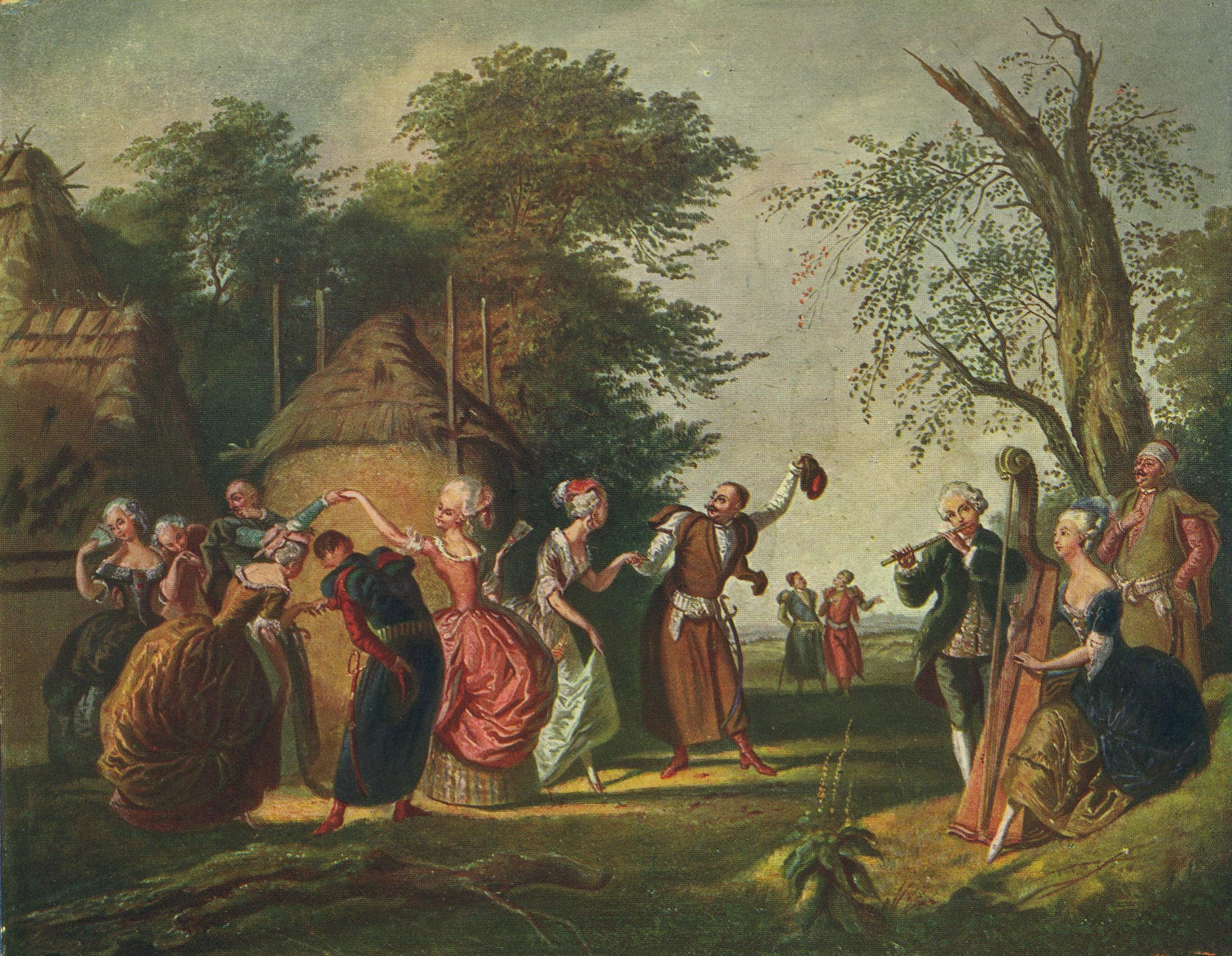
Polonaise - national dance of Poland, inscribed on the Intangible cultural heritage list by Unesco

=== Poland ===
Polish folk dances (singular: taniec ludowy, plural: tańce ludowe) Polish dances are deeply rooted in the old and rich Polish tradition and culture. Polish folk dances greatly influenced the whole European music scene, ballrooms, European salons, classical music as well as European folk dances. Later the Polish dance culture spread to other continents, i.e. the US, Canada, South America. Poland's renown 5 National Dances are some of the most popular dances in Europe, these are the Polonaise, Mazur/Mazurka, Krakowiak, Kujawiak and Oberek. They are very interesting and quite distinct at the same time being some of the most complex and the most difficult folk dances in the world. Polish National Dances include variety of elements, such as formal ballroom, ballet, acrobatic, theatre elements amongst others. Their beauty and harmony is always complemented by the specific costumes that reflect the aura of the past centuries, historical events, culture and the very spirit of Poland and her people. Polish folk culture and Polish folk/ classic/ballroom music tradition is one of the very important elements of the rich Polish culture and heritage. Some of the many specificities of the Polish dances involve a circle (Polish: koło [ˈkɔwɔ] "circle", kołem [ˈkɔwɛm] "in a circle"), partners, couples, trios as well as group and/or solo dancers, some of the dances are majestic and very dignified, hieratic, noble and elegant, expressing sophistication and the very nature of the styles, moods and events (i.e. polonaise, Mazur/Mazurka), others in contrast are lively, energetic and joyful. Polish folk dances greatly influenced ballet and well as many other dances and dance art forms. Polish regional dances are the ones specific to a given region, village or city. Podhale, Southern Poland features the culture of the Gorals, Polish highlanders and people ethnic to the mountainous regions. Some similar versions can be found at the Gorals in Slovakia and in Czech Republic. The rhythm of their music is different from the music of the lowlands.

Dance from this region are composed of dancing various figures in different combinations dependant on the lively music played on live instruments. They are very technical to execute. These figures include: ozwodnom, bokem, zwyrtanom, wiecnom, drobnom, po dylu, obijanom, grzybowom, po razie, po dwa, and po śtyry. The most popular dances include Zbójnicki, Juhaski, Góralski. These dances include parts where the pair dances together as well as apart. All Polish dances follow specific and well defined steps, sequences, figures, movements, details and accessories each telling a specific story. The oldest Polish dance, known since archaic times is Polonaise/Chodzony dance, it is one of the very specific ancient Polish dances. Its French name "polonaise' reflects the origins of the dance and means "the Polish woman/lady/dance, it is a French adjective feminine. It has been introduced to France in the 16th century. In the past, in Poland the dance was called Chodzony. Nowadays, Polonaise name is the most popular, although locally in Poland, some people still call it Chodzony and use it interchangeably with Polonaise. The original Polish folk dance traditions continue to play an important part in the culture of the country and for centuries, have been a constant element of the Polish social, musical and cultural life, i.e. Polonaise dance is always, traditionally the first and the opening dance at all formal and important events, for example studniówka ball, that occurs every year as the high school students ball, 100 days before the maturity exam (the final high school exam), New Year's balls and similar.

Polish folk dances are also in interrelations with other types of artistic expressions. Some examples can be seen in the classical music, cinema, art, theatre, the pop culture and design. Some of the very numerous Polish folk dances that are not included in the category of Polish national dances are: trojniak, polka, pisany, chmielowy, kashubian dances, hajduk, kołomajka, lasowiak, mazurek and many others.

=== Germany ===
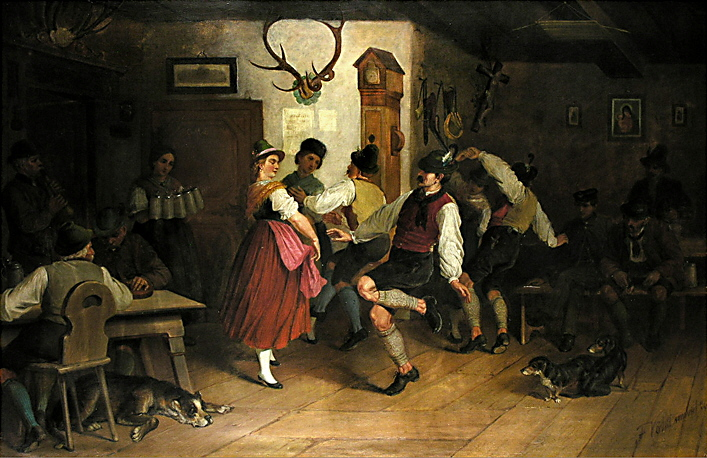
German Schuhplattler dance

Germany does not have an official national dance, but recognized dance styles include:

- The Schuhplattler: This dance was first of record in 1030 AD, when a monk in the Tegernsee Abbey of Bavaria described a village dance containing leaps and hand gestures. Over the centuries, the form gradually evolved as farmers, hunters, and woodsmen practiced it in the isolated towns and villages of the Bavarian and Tyrolean Alps.
- Ländler: A dance for couples showing fierceness and trampling. Sometimes it is purely instrumental and sometimes is accompanied by vocal arrangements including yodeling. When ballroom dancing became popular in Europe in the 19th century, Ländler became faster and more elegant and men took the nails off of the boots they danced with. It is believed to be the forerunner of the waltz.
- Polka: Originating in Slavic lands, in Bohemia in 1830, it is considered a national Czech dance. It later gained popularity in all European countries, USA and Canada.

=== Ireland ===
Irish Dance refers to a group of traditional dance forms originating from Ireland, encompassing dancing both solo and in groups, and dancing for social, competitive dance, and performance. Irish dance in its current form developed from various influences such as earlier Irish country dance, and later possibly French quadrilles and other European dances such as Polish mazurek as it became popular in Ireland and later also in Britain during the end 19th Century. Dance was taught by "travelling dance masters" across Ireland in the 18/19th century, and separate dance forms developed according to regional practice and differing purposes. Irish dance became a significant part of Irish culture, particularly for Irish nationalist patriotic movements, that helped Ireland and the Irish people to keep their strong national identity.

=== Hungary ===
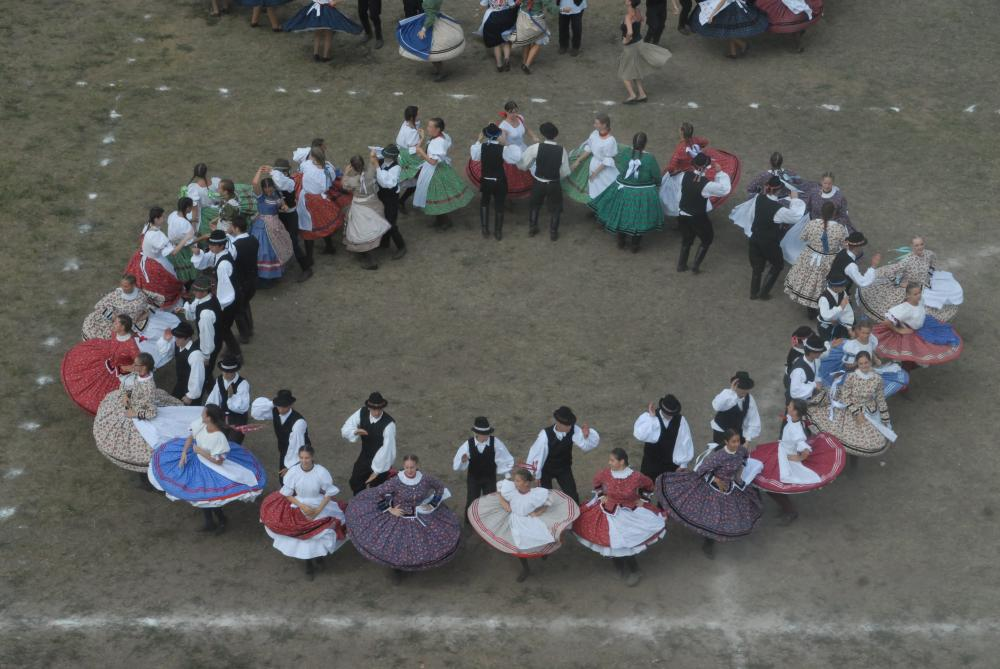
Hungarian Karikázó

Hungarian dance refers to the folk dances practised and performed by the Hungarians, both amongst the populations native to Hungary and its neighbours, and also amongst the Hungarian diaspora.

According to György Martin, a prominent folklore expert, Hungarian dances can be divided into two categories. The first refers to dances performed in the Middle Ages while the second relates to the 18th and 19th century. Hungarians have been noted for their "exceptionally well developed sense of rhythm". In the mid-19th century, Musicologist Theodor Billroth performed tests with troops of various nationalities stationed in Vienna and found that the Hungarian troops outperformed others in keeping time with music.

Improvisation and energetic movements are often mentioned as being characteristic of Hungarian dance. One of the most popular Hungarian dances is Csárdás/Czárdás.

=== Russia ===
Many Russian folk dances became known from the 10th century. Russia witnessed various invasions from other countries. Due to its location and size the country also came into contact with many different cultures through migration. In turn, a Eurasian cultural mix of music and dance helped develop Russian folk dances.

The original Russian folk dance traditions continue to play an important part in the culture of the country and have been in constant interaction with Russia's many ethnic groups. Russian folk dances are also in interrelations with other types of artistic expressions. One example can be seen in the Ballets Russes, which involves some Russian/Eurasian folk dances.

=== Czechia ===
The national dance of Czechia is Česka polka, invented in 1822, it became particularly popular and liked in Germany, Italy and other European countries as well as the USA.

=== Ukraine ===
The main dance genres of Ukrainian folk dance are round dance, as one of the oldest types of folk dance art, the performance of which is associated with calendar rites, and everyday dance, which includes metelitsa, hopak, kozachok, hutsulka, kolomyika, square dance, polka.

=== Italy ===
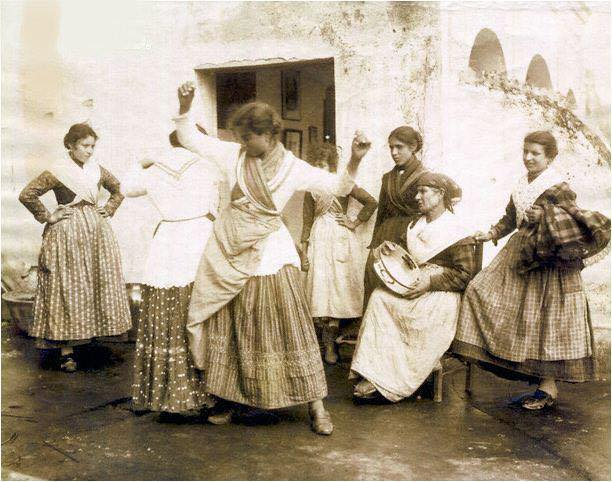
Italian tarantella

Italian folk dance has been an integral part of Italian culture for centuries. Dance has been a continuous thread in Italian life from Dante through the Renaissance, the advent of the tarantella in Southern Italy, and the modern revivals of folk music and dance. Italian folk dances, were influenced by Slavic dance, polka, popularised in the 19c.
