= Polish folk dances =

Type of dance

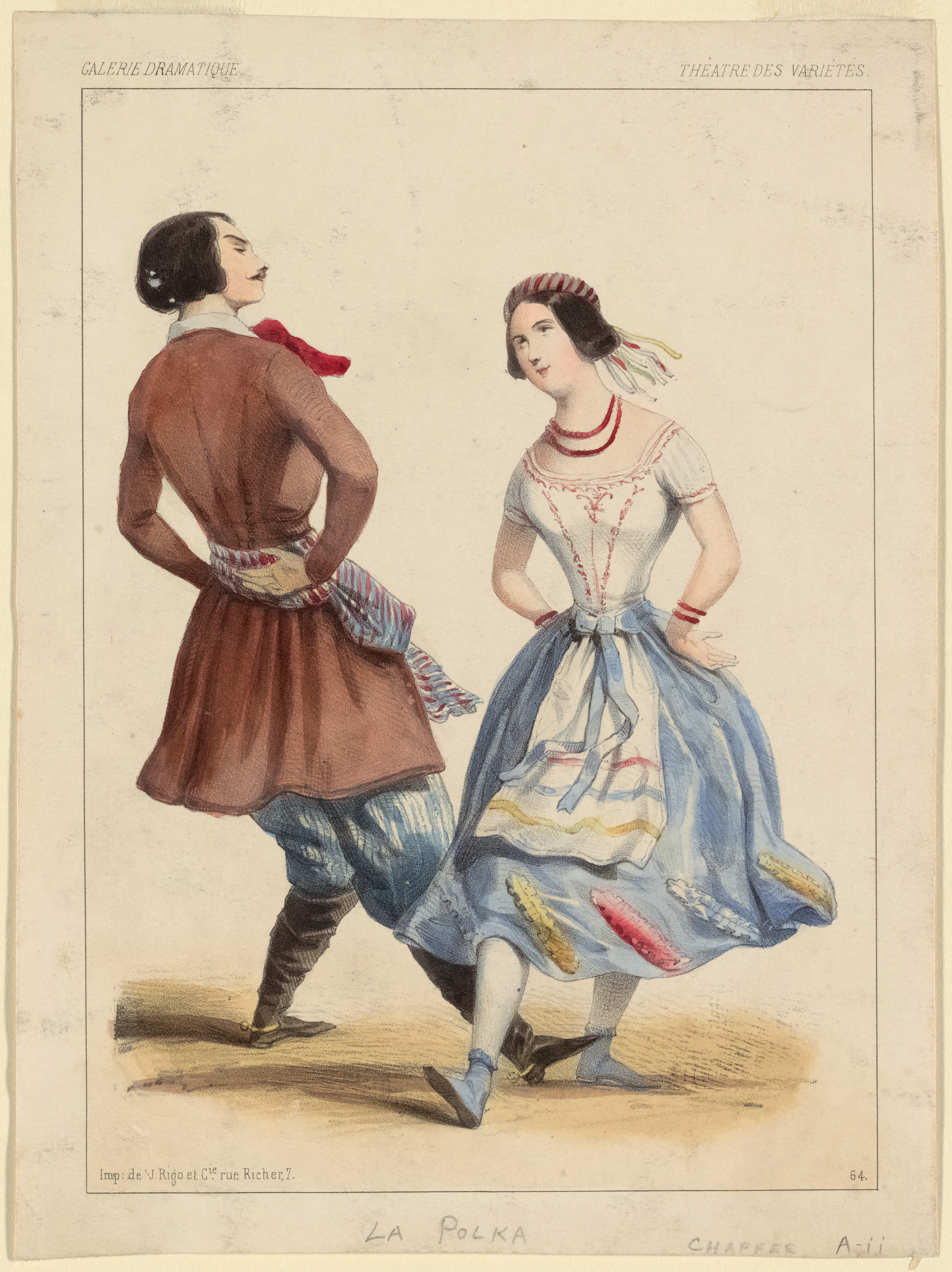
Bohemian Polka had a profound impact on Polish dances and became widespread

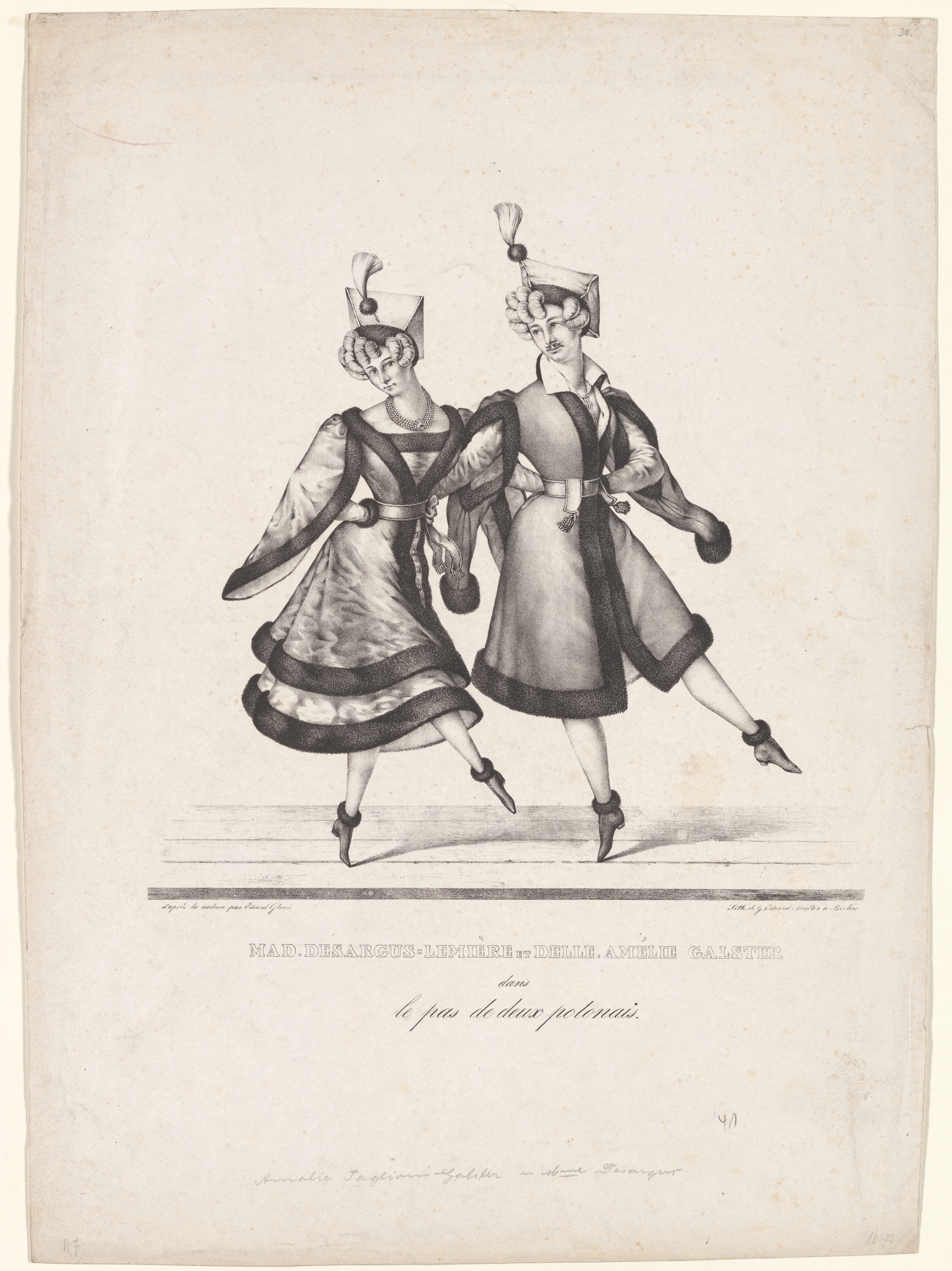
The Polonaise is the national dance of Poland and is performed at formal occasions

Polonaise in A Major, Op. 40 No. 1 by Chopin, 1838

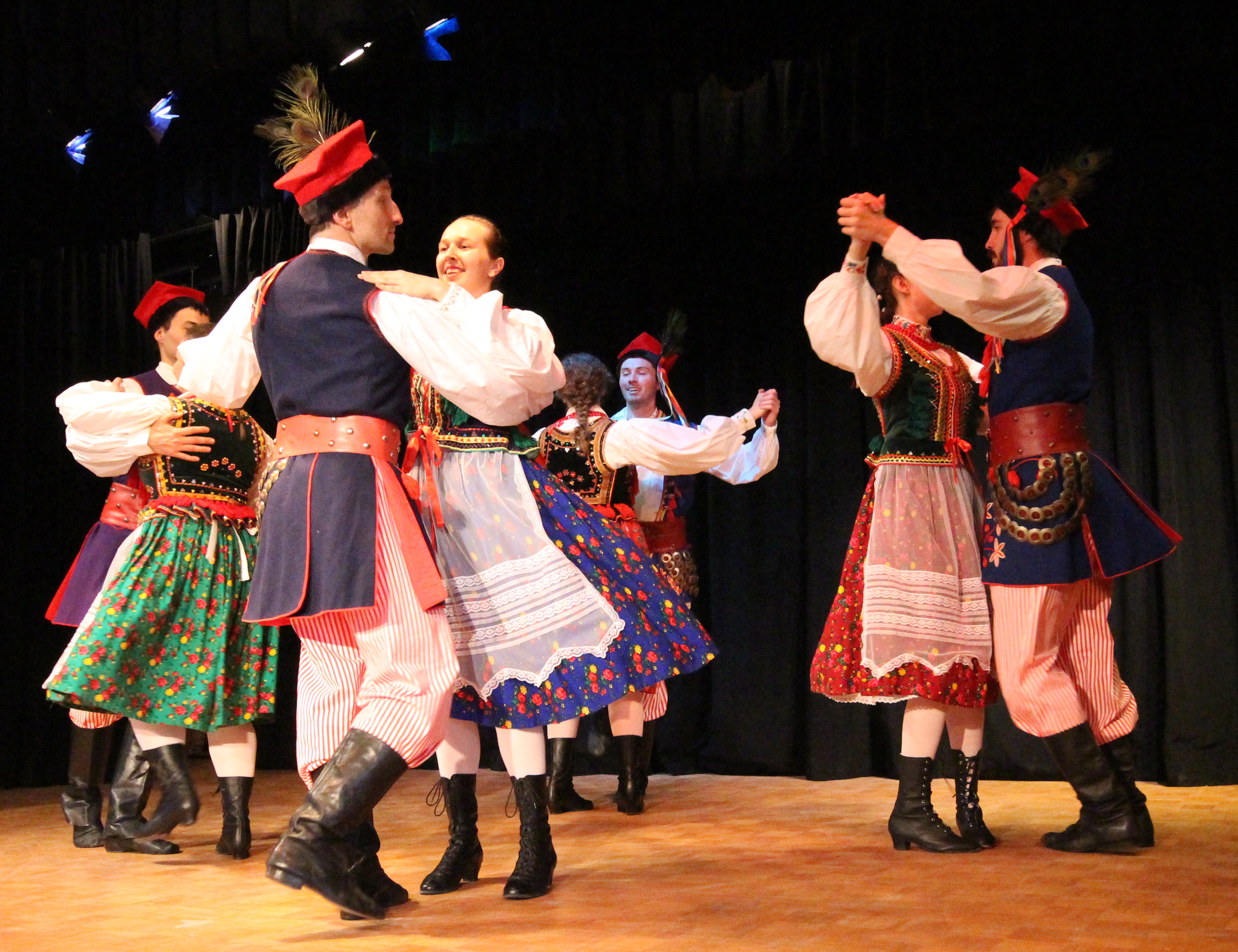
Dancers from the Polanie Folk Dance Group in Ottawa wearing costumes from the Kraków region. 2019

Polish folk dances are a tradition rooted in ten centuries of Polish culture and history. Many of the dances stem from regional customs and historical events and are distinct from Czech, Slovak and Germanic styles. National dances include formal ballroom or ballet elements. Nowadays, the dances are only performed during major events, holidays or in tourist-oriented public spaces.

The most notable and renowned dances of Poland, also known as Poland's National Dances, are the Krakowiak, Mazurka, Oberek, Polonaise and Kujawiak. A great promoter of Polish folk music abroad was pianist and composer Frédéric Chopin, who often incorporated folklore into his works.

== Overview ==
Dancers at Wikimania 2024, Katowice

Polish folk dances (singular: taniec ludowy, pronounced [ˈtaɲɛts luˈdɔvɨ]; plural: tańce ludowe [ˈtaɲtsɛ luˈdɔvɛ]) tend to be lively, energetic, and joyful. Hops, twirls, and athletic movements are common. Many dances involve a circle (Polish: koło [ˈkɔwɔ] "circle", kołem [ˈkɔwɛm] "in a circle") but also partners.

== National dances ==
The Polish national dances are the Krakowiak, Kujawiak, Mazurek, Oberek, and Polonaise. These dances are classified as National, because almost every region in Poland has displayed a variety of these dances. Many of these dances were brought to the ballroom floor following Napoleon's expansion into Central and Eastern Europe, which brought French nobility imitating the Polish peasants style of dance, and adding flavors of ballet.

=== Krakowiak ===
The Krakowiak (pronounced [kraˈkɔvʲak]), also known as the Cracovienne, is a fast, syncopated Polish dance in duple time from the region of Kraków and Lesser Poland.

=== Kujawiak ===
The Kujawiak [kuˈjavʲak] is a dance from the region of Kuyavia in central Poland. The most romantic of the national dances, the Kujawiak is a slow dance in 3/4 metre, danced with couples.

=== Mazur ===
The Mazur is a faster dance in which pairs glide across the floor. The dance is laced heavily with French influences and the dancers move with grace and speed. The Mazur was one of Chopin's biggest influences when composing his music.

=== Oberek ===
The Oberek is a fast, vivacious dance in 3/8 time. The word "oberek" is derived from "obrot" meaning, "to turn". Great leaps and feats of athleticism are demonstrated by the men.

=== Polonaise ===
The Polonaise is the most stately of the national dances. Danced in triple (3/4) metre, the Polonaise is often the first dance at large events. In Poland, the Polonaise is called the Polonez, or less often the Chodzony (literally, "walking dance").

== Regional dances ==
Polish regional dances are ones specific to a given region or city.

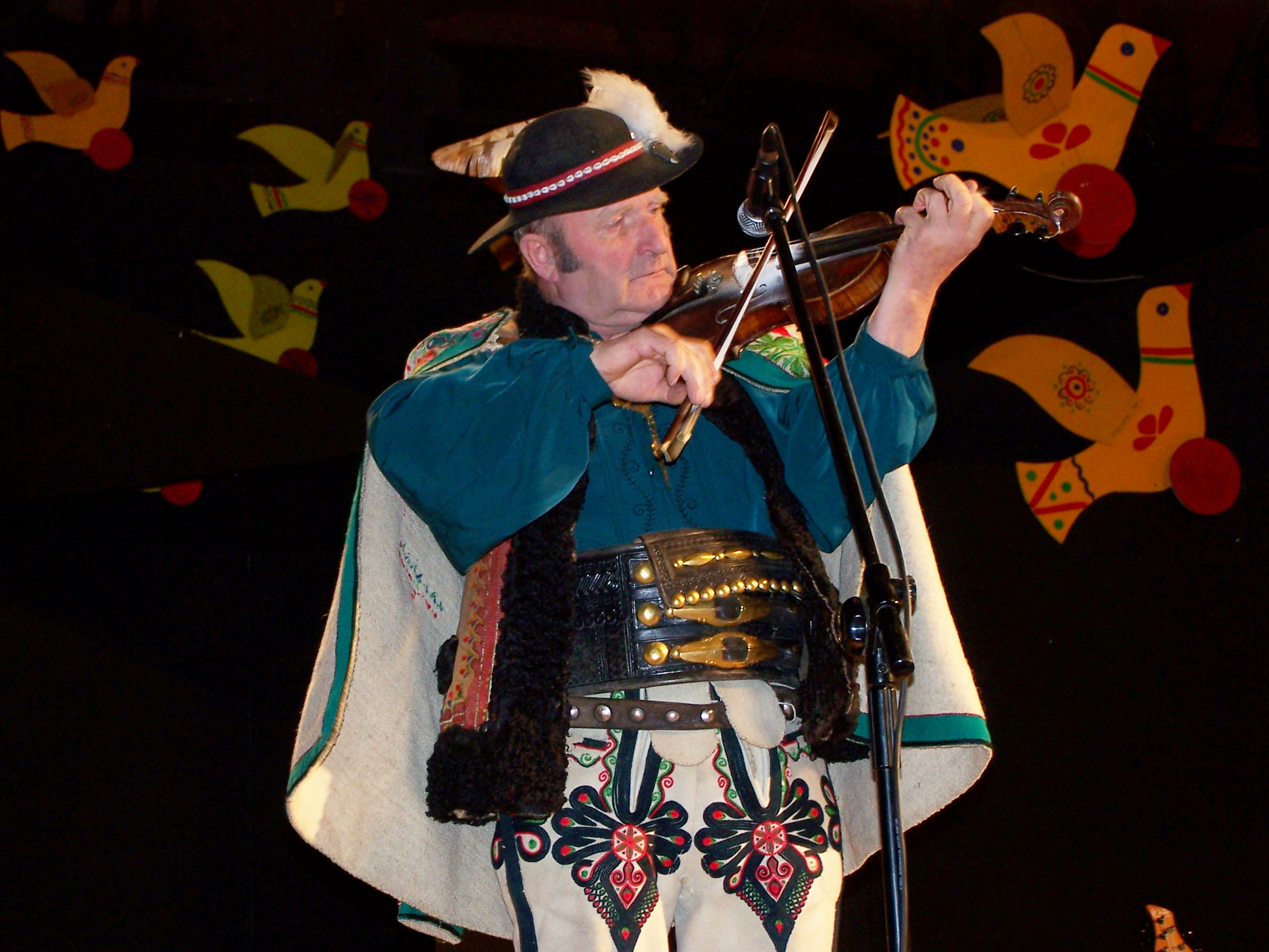
Goral of Podhale - member of Trebunie-Tutki folk band from Zakopane.

=== Podhale ===
Southern Poland features the culture of the Gorals, Polish highlanders and people ethnic to the mountainous regions. These dances were brought by Vlach settlers in the 17th century. Very similar versions can be found at the Gorals in Slovakia and in Czech Republic. The rhythm of their music is different for the otherwise duple or triple-metre of the lowlands.

Dance from this region are composed of dancing various figures in different combinations dependant on the lively music played on live instruments. They are considered to be very technical to execute. These figures include: ozwodnom, bokem, zwyrtanom, wiecnom, drobnom, po dylu, obijanom, grzybowom, po razie, po dwa, and po śtyry.

The most popular dances include Juhaski, Góralski and Zbójnicki. These dances include parts where the pair dances together as well as apart.

=== Śląsk (Silesia) ===
Silesia was a German-controlled region at one point, with a thriving Polish majority in Upper Silesia. Its songs and dances are simpler, yet very similar to their southern counterparts; Slovakia and the Czech Republic. Silesian songs like Szła Dzieweczka (The Walking Girl) have been popularized in Poland and abroad thanks to state ensembles Śląsk Song and Dance Ensemble and Mazowsze (folk group).

The most popular dances in this region were Owięziok, Piłka, Szewc (shoemaker) and Masztołka. Wirowe (spinning) dances included Wrona (crow), Kowol (blacksmith), Łowczorz, Klaskany (clapping dance), Świniok (pig dance) and Zbój.Dances in individual pairs included Kołomajki, Rejna and Kucznierz. Trójkowe dances (dances done in groups of three) and zbiorowe dances (in groups) include Chustkowy, Błogosławiony and Czworok. There were also dances such as Żabiokor Zajązek, which were created for men to show off for the women.

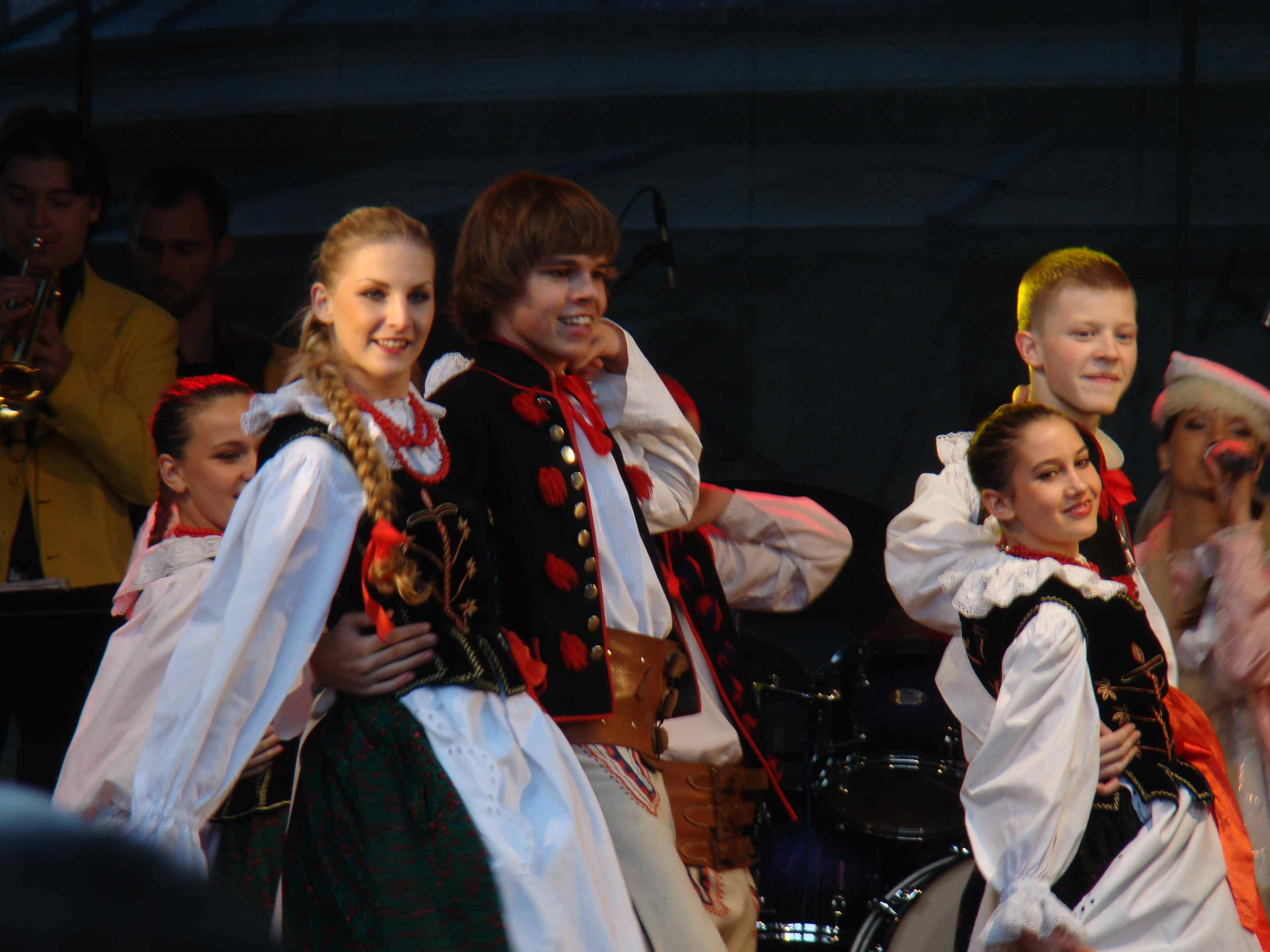
Gorals of Żywiec (2008)

=== Żywiecczyzna ===
This Southern region of Poland is home to the Gorale Żywieccy (Żywiec Highlanders). There are two different types of dances found in this region: Tańce Zbiorowe (group dances) and Tańce Parowe (dances in pairs). In the first type, there are different parts of the dance where sometimes pairs dance alone, while at other time they join other pairs to dance in a group. An example of this would be the dance called Koło (circle), Koń (horse), Krzyżok and Na Bon. The second type of dance in this region is simply pairs dancing independently. The most popular dances from this region are Obyrtka, Hajduk, Siustany and Tańiec Zbójnicki na Żywiecczyźnie.

=== Kashubia ===
The northern region of Kashubia, in Polish called Kaszuby, has a variety dances with various national influences due to the ports found on the ocean border in this area. Along with its rich culture, this region also has a regional language, Kashubian, which is still spoken today by a couple thousand of the regions' inhabitants.

There many dances from this region. The names, with their variations across the region, can be found in the collapsible list titled "Kaszuby Dances".

Kaszuby Dances
- Butnowi / oknowi / korkowi tuńc
- Biésowi / trzech biésów tuńc
- Buksola / Naspik
- Cepôrz
- Dzëk
- Glëmda ‘guzdrała, niedorajda’
- Kaszëbsczi polonézer
- Klepôcz / Wiwat klepóny / Wiwat zaproszenie / Wiwat traptôcz / Dzëk wiwat
- Kluczi tuńc
- Koséder
- Kozełk
- Kozy tuńc
- Krzyżnik / Krzëżôk / Kric-polka / Huzar-polka / Lelôk / W noga
- Kuchniowëch tuńc
- Lësy groch ‘lisi groch’
- Marëszka
- Mulszka
- Na dłëdżi len
- Naszô Koza
- Naszô Nënka
- Okrac so wkół
- Owczarz / szeper / miotlarz
- Rëbôcczi tuńc / kuflôrz
- Skwôrz
- Szewc
- Szôlony tuńc
- Wele Wita
- Wiém jô wiém
- Wôłtôk / Wetrójnik
- Wróżbë
- Zac
- Żokowé tuńce

=== Lublin ===
The Lublin area is one of the more colourful of all the Polish regions, with costumes made with a variety of different coloured materials and ribbons. There are a variety of dances found in this region that may also be found in different regions across Poland. These dances include waltzes, oberki and chodzone (pronounced "hod-zon-e", meaning walking dance) with a time signature of ¾, and various fast-paced polkas (Link) such as Polka Podlaska ("Podlachian Polka") with a time signature of 4/4.

Though some dances are shared across regions with slight variations, Mach (pronounced "mah"), Osa ("wasp"), Cygan, Pożon, Reczka (Hreczka) are some region specific dances from Lublin.

Dancing games were also very popular and considered as part of the dancing culture. Śpiuch, Wałach, Weksel and Mietlorzare a few of the popular games from this region.

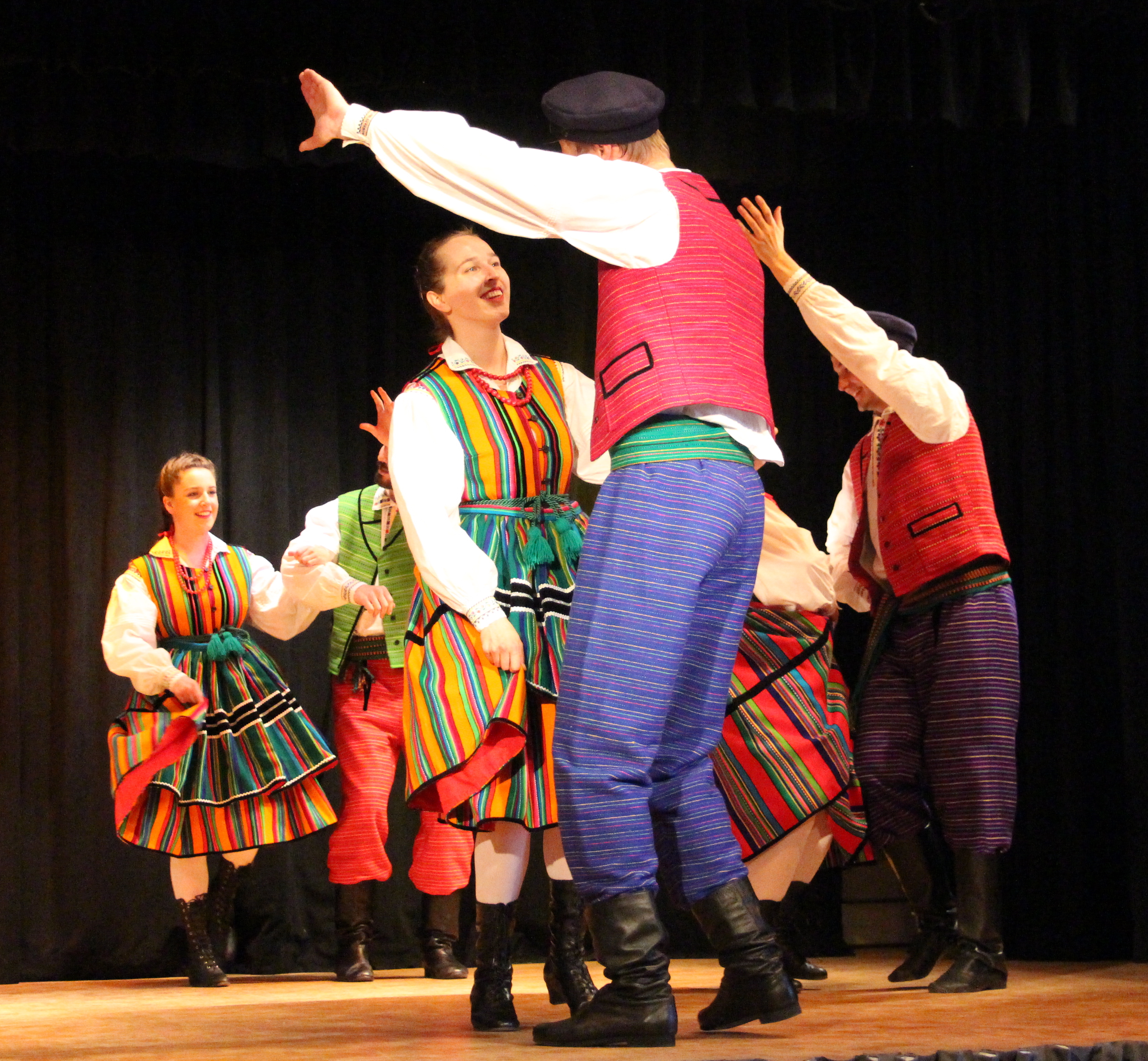
Dancers from the Polanie Folk Dance Group in Ottawa wearing costumes from the Opoczno region. 2019

=== Opoczno ===
The costumes in this region are very colourful with many variations for both men and women. Oberek is the most popular dance in this region; however, polkas, waltzes and Mazurki are very common in this region as well. Strong accents and stomping of the feet by men are very characteristic features of the dances from Opoczno. Other dances found in this region include Tramblanka, Polka Drygana, Polka Staroświecka, Chdodzony (walking), Kowol (blacksmith), Szewiec (shoesmith), Krzyżok and Mietlorz.

=== Rzeszów ===
The songs and dances from the Rzeszów region are fast-paced and very energetic. There are two different types of dances found in this region: Tańce Zbiorowe (group dances) and Tańce Pojedynczych Par (dances in pairs). In the first type, there are different parts of the dance where sometimes pairs dance alone, while at other time they join other pairs to dance in a group. An example of this would be the dance called Ułan. The second type of dance in this region is simply pairs dancing independently.

Dances from this region which are still often practiced and performed by Polish Folk Dancing groups include Polka bez nogi (Polka without one leg), Polka w lewo (Polka to the left), Trampolka, Chodzonego (pronounced "hod-zon-e-gogh", meaning walking dance), Oberek, Sztajerek and Waltz. These dances can also be found in the surrounding areas with slight modifications. Other dances from this region include Z Powódka, Polka z Boku (Polka on the side), Drobny z Krzemienicy, Polka z Kropką (Polka with a dot), Polka Uginana (Polka with bent legs), Polka Kucana (squatting Polka), Polka Dzwon, Wolny (slow), Powröz and Kulawka.

=== Warmia ===
This Northern region, which has borders along the sea and lakes, has songs and dances which were popular with sailors, fishermen and merchants. The more popular dances in the region included walce równe (an even waltz) and Podcinacze. Polkas from this region included Polkas called Drobnymi, Polka Mazurka, Polka Warmińska, Polka z Knikzsemczy and Polka Hasana. Other dances included Wilk (wolf), Baran (sheep), Pofajdok, Szot, Kosejder, Baba (old lady), Puszczany, Lowiska, Szewc (shoemaker), Kowal (blacksmith), Kłaniany (Bowing), Puszczany, Kozak, Biwat Obchodny (walking) and Kłaniany (bowing), Krakowiaczek and Rozpuszczak.

Some of the newer dances were called Okrągłymi (round). They were called as such because they involved everyone dancing in a circle performing the same dance movement.

Dancing games were also very popular and a part of dance. Dancing games from this region included: A nogami drap, drap, drap (Step, step, step with your legs); Dwa Gołębie, Hejduk and Żabka (little frog).

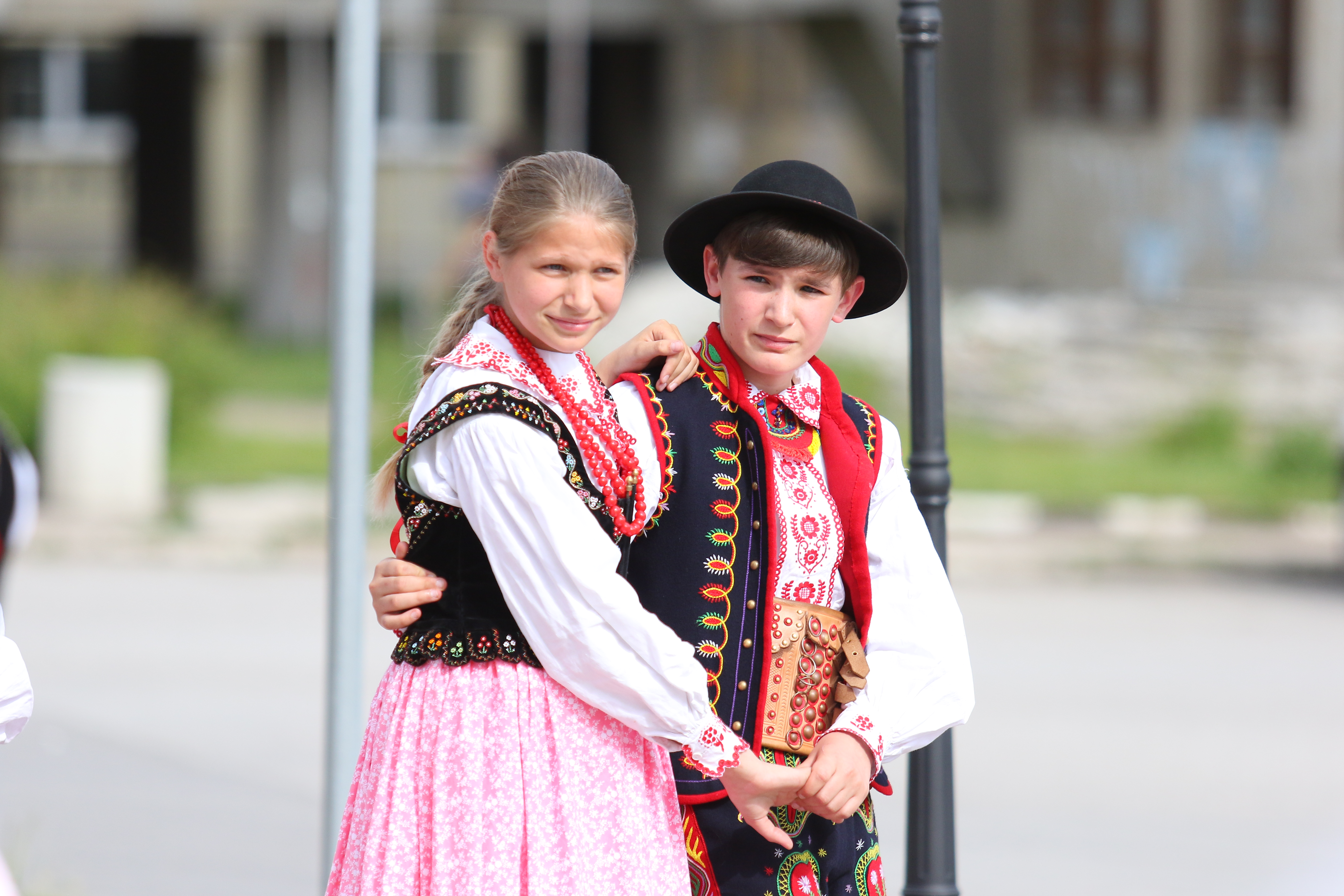
Men's and women's costume from the "Lachy Sądeckie" region.

=== Other regions ===
There are many regions in Poland with unique regional dances worth noting. They include Łowicz, Lachy Sądeckie, Kujawy, Kurpie, and Wielkopolska.

== Folk groups ==
Polish Folk Song and Dance groups (in Polish: Zespół Pieśni i Tańca or ZPiT) include:

- Mazowsze (folk group)
- Śląsk Song and Dance Ensemble
- Harnam
- Lajkonik Polish Folk Ensemble
- Wici Song and Dance Theater
- Polonia Polish Folk Song & Dance Ensemble
- Wesoly Lud Polish Folk Dance Company of PRCUA

== See also ==
- National costumes of Poland
- Folk dance
- Folk music
