= Stefan Łodwigowski =

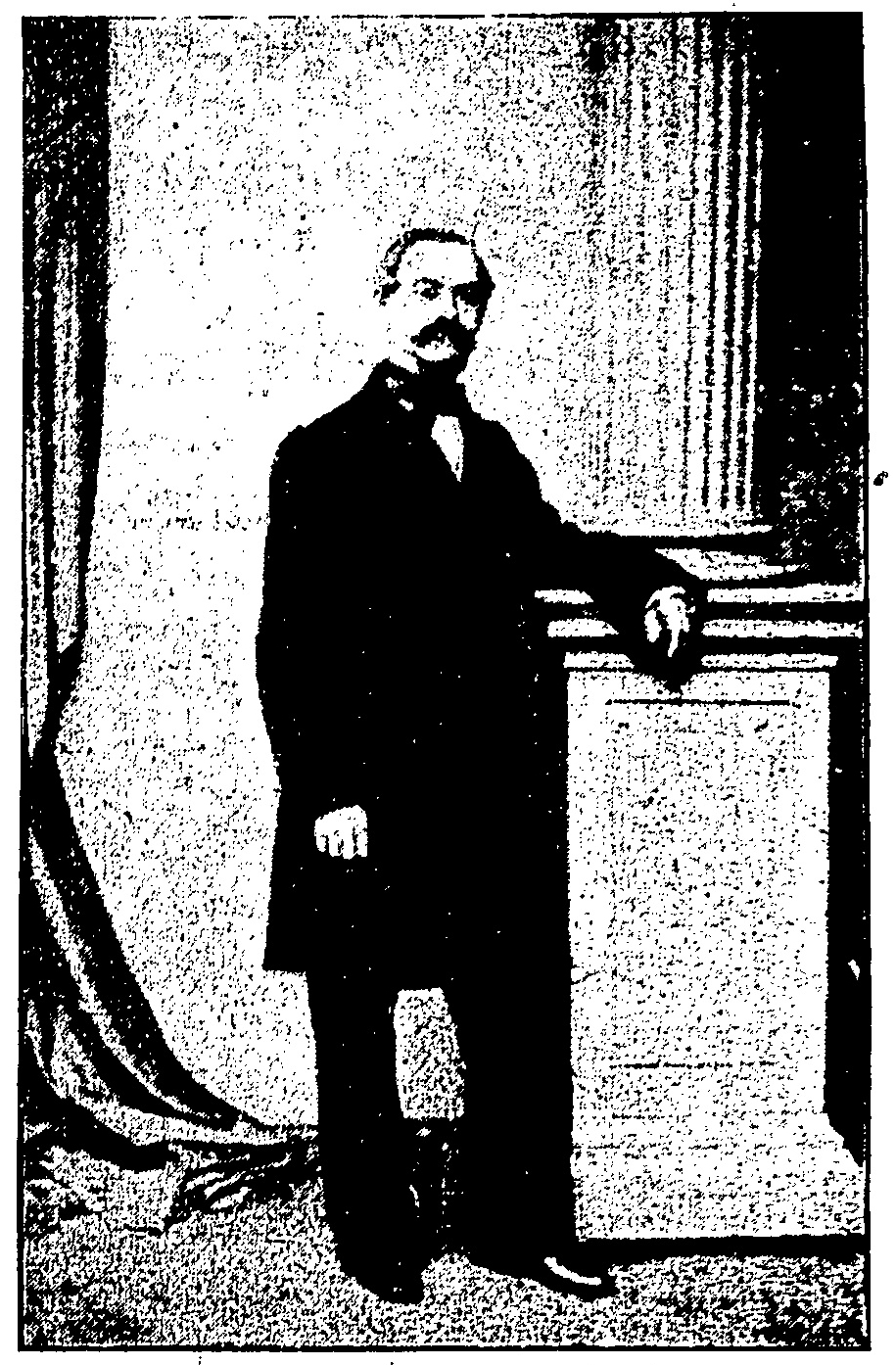
Stefan Łodwigowski

Edward Stefan Łodwigowski (14 August 1815 – 12 November 1895) was a Polish composer.

Born near Iłża in 1815, he first studied music privately with his father, who was a kapellmeister. He died, when Łodwigowski was 12. He stayed in Warsaw since 1840. In 1854 he was residing at Robert Bothe's house in the Nowy Świat Street.

His compositions, though being at best of middle-importance, were successful, especially mazurkas, polonaises and cracoviennes. He also published some transcriptions from Stanisław Moniuszko's operas. By the end of his life, Łodwigowski was an old-fashioned pianist and taught the basics of music. He died in Warsaw on his 80th year.
