= La Varsovienne =

La Varsovienne may refer to:

- Warszawianka (1831), Polish patriotic song originally written in French as La Varsovienne
- Whirlwinds of Danger or Warszawianka (1905), Polish revolutionary song originally written in Polish, later popular in France as La Varsovienne

See also

- Varsovienne, Polish dance
