= 9/8 =

9/8 may refer to:

- September 8 (month-day date notation)
- August 9 (day-month date notation)
- Triple metre, a musical metre
