= Polonaise =

Dance originating in Poland

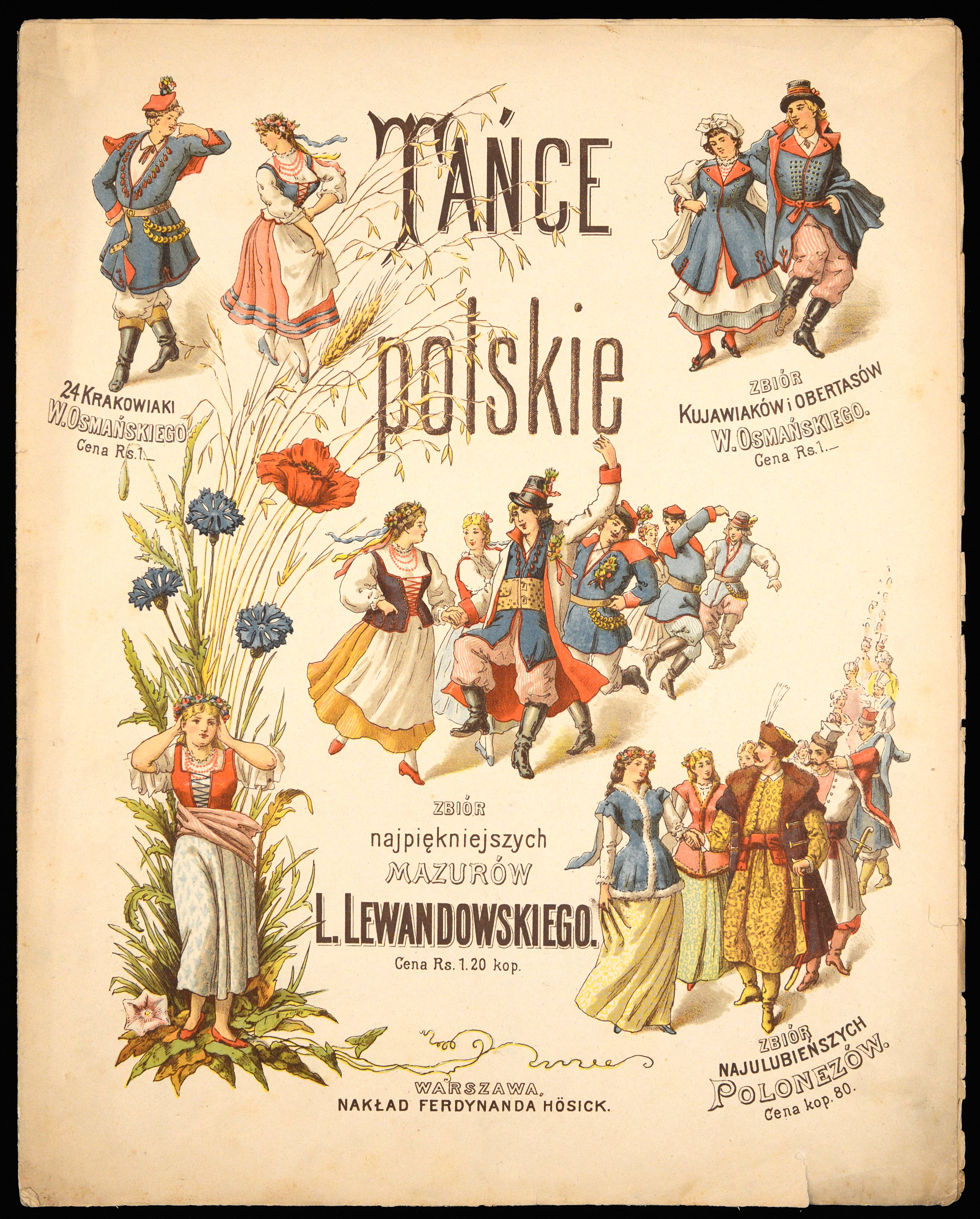
- "Polish Dances. A collection of the most favorite polonaises", cover (1890)
- Native name: Polonez, chodzony
- Genre: Traditional dance
- Time signature: 3/4
- Origin: Poland

Polonaise, traditional Polish dance
- UNESCO Intangible Cultural Heritage
- Country: Poland
- Reference: 01982
- Region: Europe and North America

Inscription history
- Inscription: 2023 (18th session)
- List: Representative

Typical rhythm of a Polonaise

The polonaise (/pɒləˈnɛz/, French: [pɔlɔnɛz]; Polish: polonez, Polish pronunciation: [pɔˈlɔnɛs]) is a dance originating in Poland, and one of the five Polish national dances in 3/4 time. The original Polish-language name of the dance is chodzony (pronounced [xɔˈd͡zɔnɨ]), denoting a walking dance. The polonaise dance influenced European ballrooms, folk music and European classical music.

The polonaise has a rhythm quite close to that of the Swedish semiquaver or sixteenth-note polska, and the two dances share a common origin. Polska dance was introduced to Sweden during the period of the Vasa dynasty and the Polish–Swedish union.

The polonaise is popular in Poland today. It is the opening dance in major events, at New Year's balls, on national days as well as other parties. The polonaise is always the first dance at a studniówka ("hundred days ball"), the Polish equivalent of the senior prom that occurs approximately 100 days before exams, hence its name "studniówka" or literally in Polish "the ball of the hundred days".

In 2023, the dance was included on the UNESCO Intangible Cultural Heritage Lists being recognized as "a form of joint celebration", which "commemorates important moments in family and community life and symbolizes cooperation, reconciliation and equality."

== Influence of Polonaise in music ==
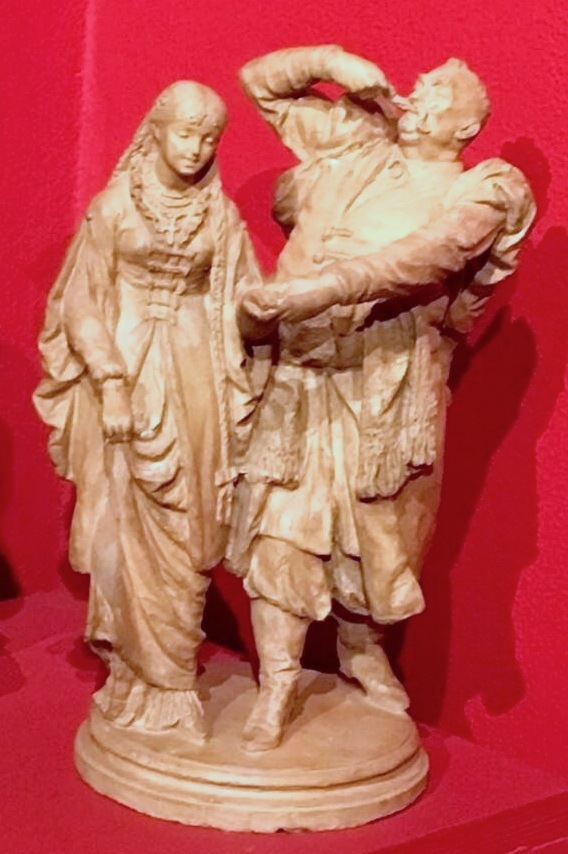
Polonaise (1888)

The notation alla polacca (Italian: polacca means "polonaise") on a musical score indicates that the piece should be played with the rhythm and character of a polonaise. For example, the third movement of Beethoven's Triple Concerto op. 56, marked "Rondo alla polacca," the last movement in Weber's Clarinet Concerto No. 2 is marked "Alla Polacca", his Horn Concertino likewise ends with a polka movement, and the finale of Chopin's Variations on "Là ci darem la mano" both feature this notation. In his book Classic Music: Expression, Form, and Style, Leonard G. Ratner cites the fourth movement from Beethoven's Serenade in D major, Op. 8, marked "Allegretto alla Polacca," as a representative example of the polonaise dance topic (Ratner 1980, pp. 12–13).

Frédéric Chopin's polonaises are generally the best known of all polonaises in classical music. However, there had been a long tradition of polonaises in Western European music at least a century before Chopin. Händel wrote a famous one, and Wilhelm Fiedemann Bach wrote a number of in major-minor pairs. Other composers who wrote polonaises or pieces in polonaise rhythm include Johann Sebastian Bach, George Frideric Handel, Georg Philipp Telemann, Joseph Haydn, Wolfgang Amadeus Mozart, Ludwig van Beethoven, Franz Danzi, Bernhard Henrik Crusell, Karol Kurpiński, Józef Elsner, Maria Agata Szymanowska, Henryk Wieniawski, Franz Schubert, Carl Maria von Weber, Clara Schumann, Robert Schumann, Franz Liszt, Johann Kaspar Mertz, Moritz Moszkowski, Modest Mussorgsky, Nicolai Rimsky-Korsakov, Pyotr Ilyich Tchaikovsky and Alexander Scriabin.

Another more recent prolific polonaise composer was the American Edward Alexander MacDowell.

John Philip Sousa wrote the Presidential Polonaise, intended to keep visitors moving briskly through the White House receiving line. Sousa wrote it in 1886 after a suggestion from then-President of the United States Chester A. Arthur, who found it undignified, temporarily replacing Hail to the Chief as the presidential march under Sousa's leadership of the United States Marine Band.

Tchaikovsky's opera Eugene Onegin, an adaption of Alexander Pushkin's novel in poetry verse, includes a famous polonaise.

== National dance ==
The polonaise is a Polish dance and is one of the five historic national dances of Poland. The others are the Mazur (Mazurka), Kujawiak, Krakowiak and Oberek. Polonaise originated as a peasant dance known under various names – chodzony ("pacer"), chmielowy ("hops"), pieszy ("walker") or wielki ("great"), recorded as early as the 15th century. In later centuries, it gained popularity among the urban population and the nobles. By the late 16th century, the folk versions of polonaise (accompanied by singing) were commonly danced by the lower Polish nobility, but the dance was not known under its current name until the 17th century. With time, it also became a favorite dance of the Polish aristocratic class and acquired an instrumental form.

== Outside Poland ==
=== France ===
The polonaise was introduced in the 17th century in French courts, although the form originated in Poland and was very popular throughout Europe. This dance in 3/4 meter was designed to entertain the French royal court. The term polonaise was used over the term polonez at the start of the 18th century.

=== Saxony ===
Princess Anna Maria of Saxony collected sheet music for polonaises throughout her life time, collecting over 350, which was focused on the finest examples of instrumentation.

=== Maluku ===
The polones (from either the Dutch polonez, or possibly the Portuguese polonesa) is a common feature of wedding receptions in Maluku. A loosely defined group dance, it typically resembles a country dance or cèilidh, or in some cases a line dance.

== Gallery ==
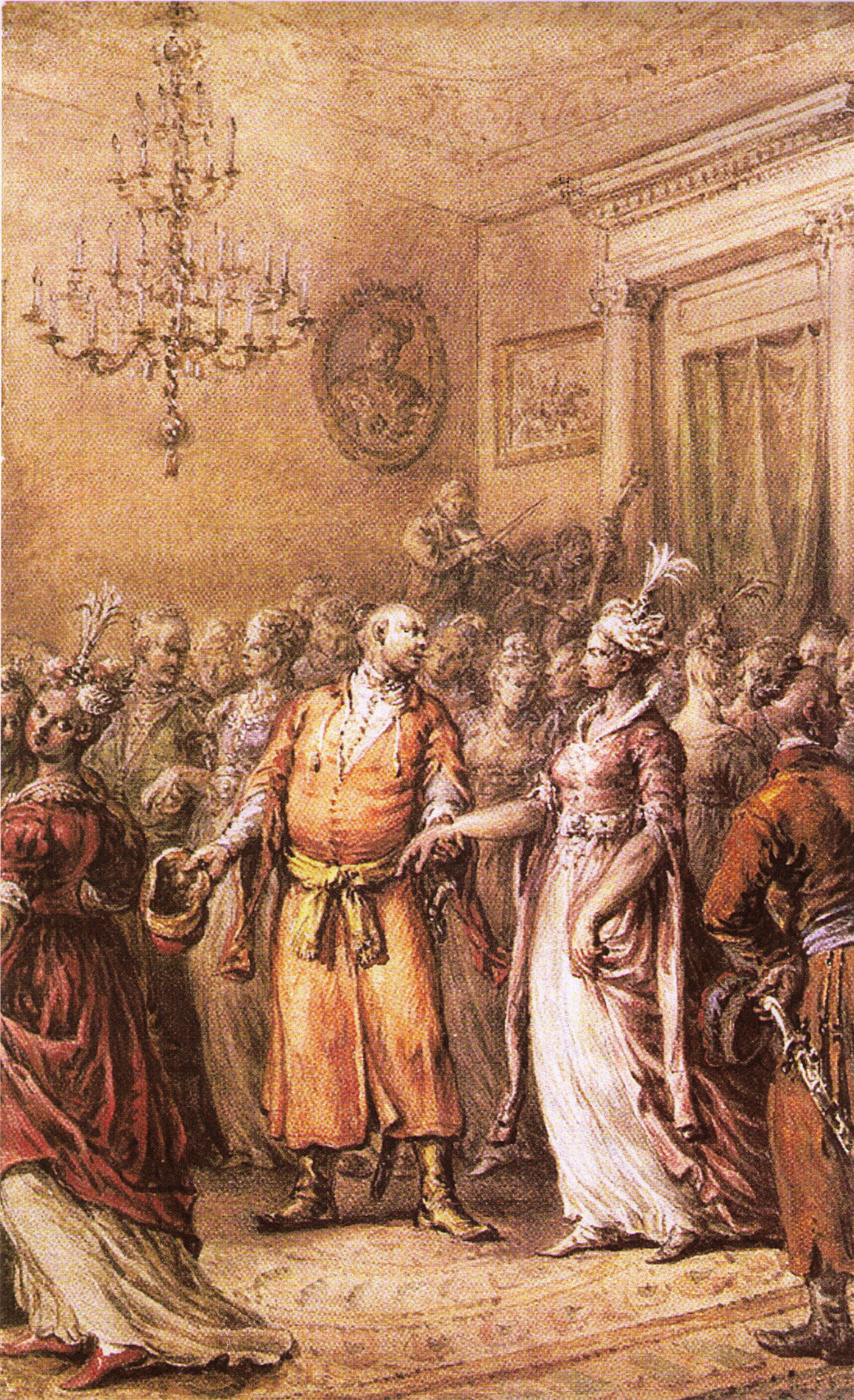
Polish Noblemen dancing Polonaise, painting by Jan Piotr Norblin

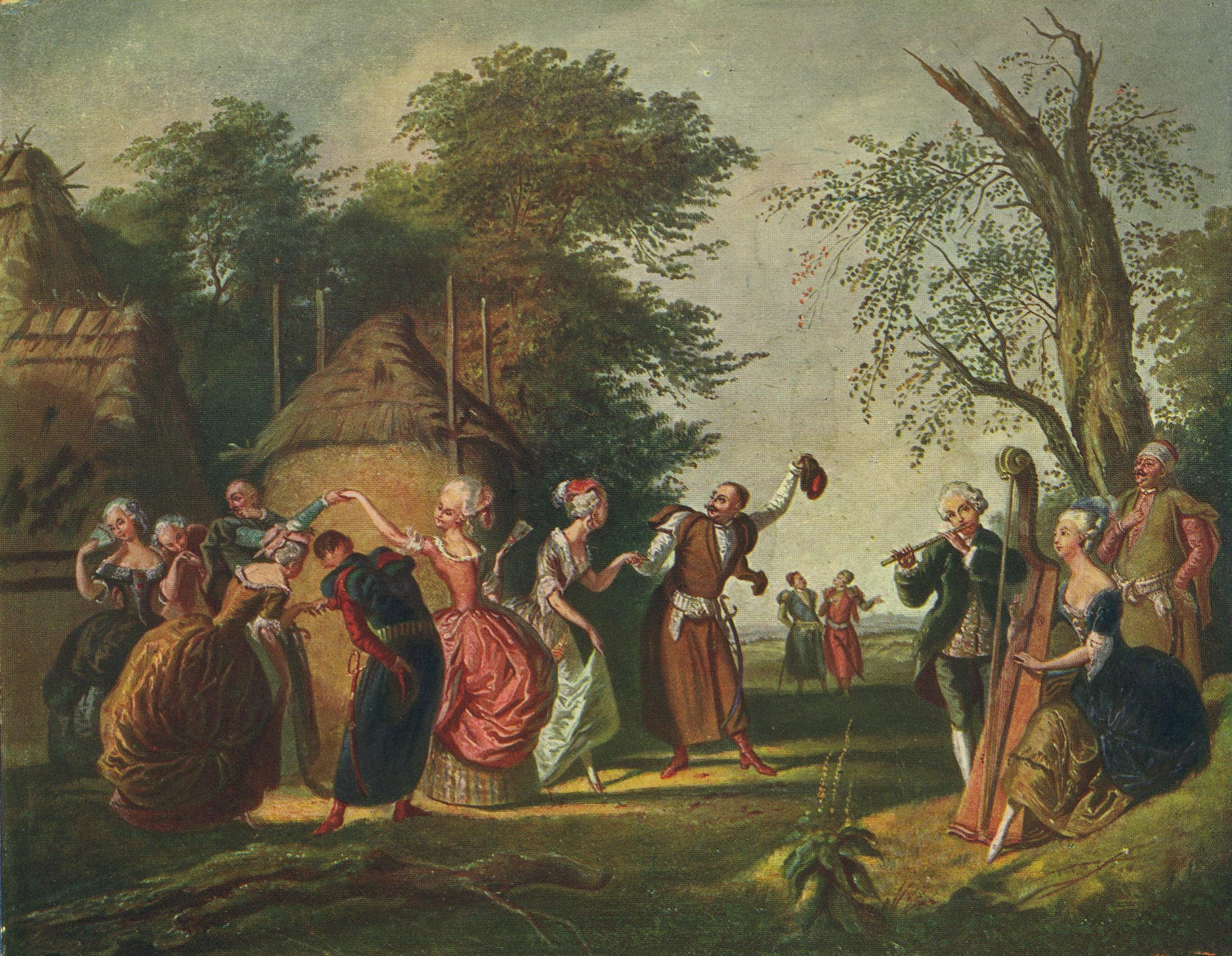
Poles dance Polonez, painting by Korneli Szlegel

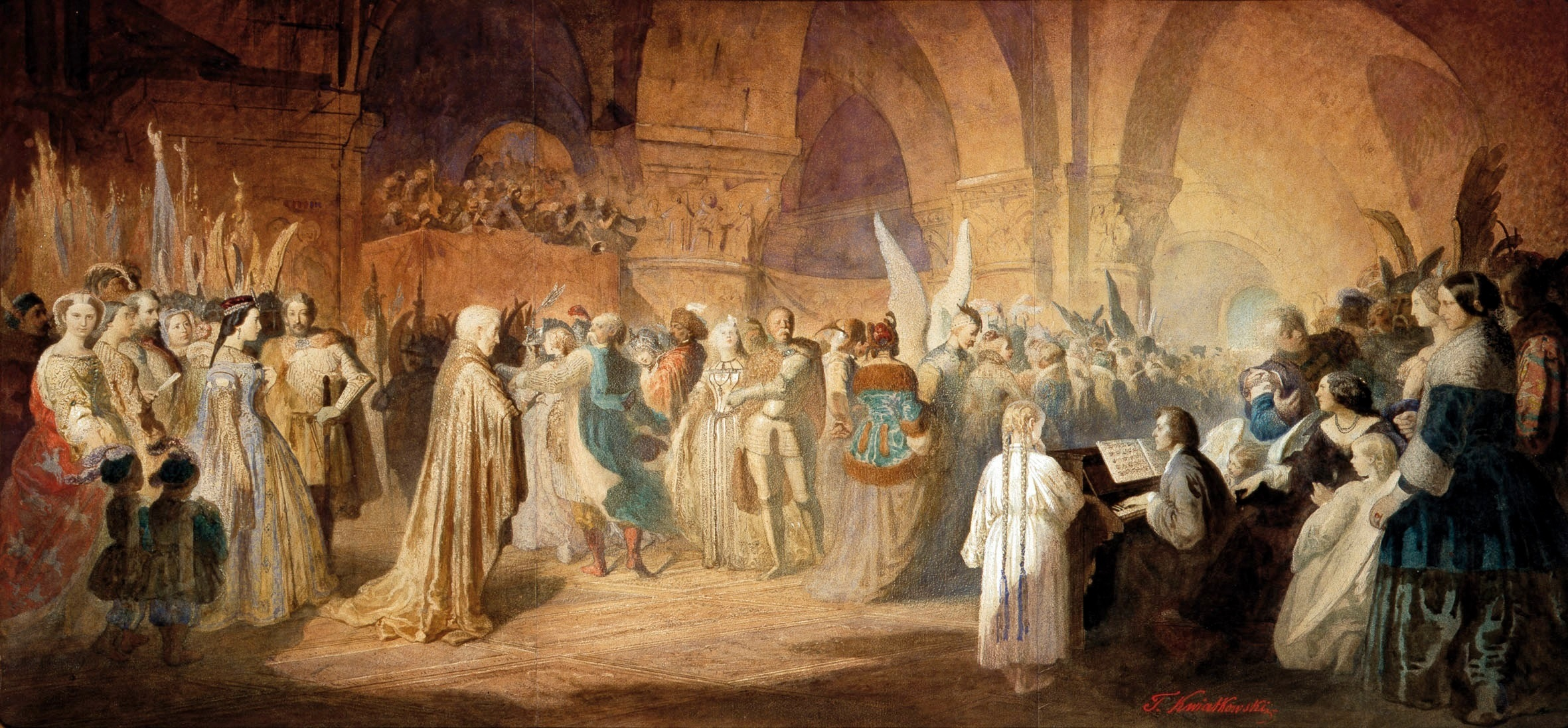
Chopin's Polonaise - a Ball in Hôtel Lambert in Paris.

== See also ==
- Waltz
- Mazurka
- Varsovienne
- Kujawiak
- Krakowiak
- Redowa
- List of Intangible Cultural Heritage elements in Eastern Europe
