= Oberek =

Traditional Polish dance

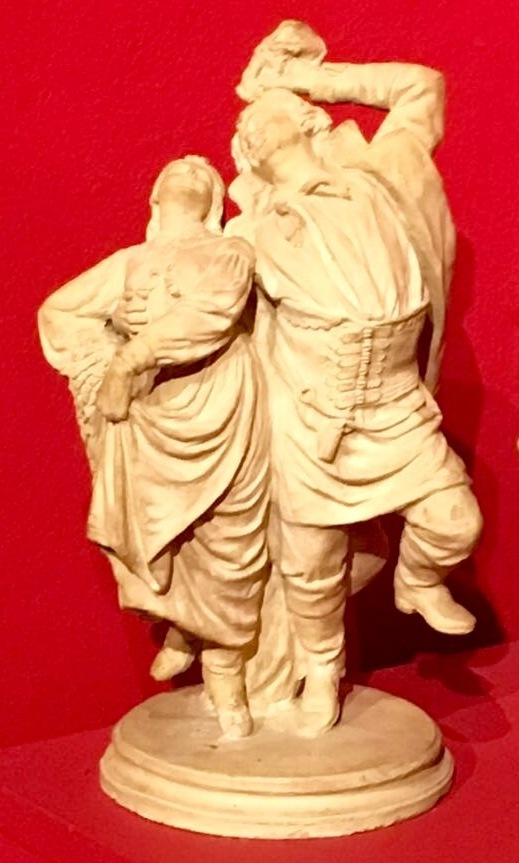
Oberek – Antoni Kurzawa, 1881.

The oberek, also known as obertas or ober, is a lively Polish dance in triple metre. Its name is derived from the Polish obracać się, meaning "to spin". It consists of many dance lifts and jumps. It is performed at a much quicker pace than the Polish waltz and is one of the national dances of Poland.

== Polish oberek (folk) ==
The oberek, in its original form, is a Polish folk dance and is the fastest of the Five National Dances of Poland. The Five National Dances are: polonez (polonaise), mazur (mazurka), kujawiak, krakowiak (cracovienne) and oberek. The oberek consists of quick steps and constant turns. The beauty of the oberek depends on each individual dancer's talent of spinning at the fast tempo of the oberek, which shares some steps with the mazur.

The music for the oberek was typically performed by a small village band, kapela, dominated by the violin in central Poland.

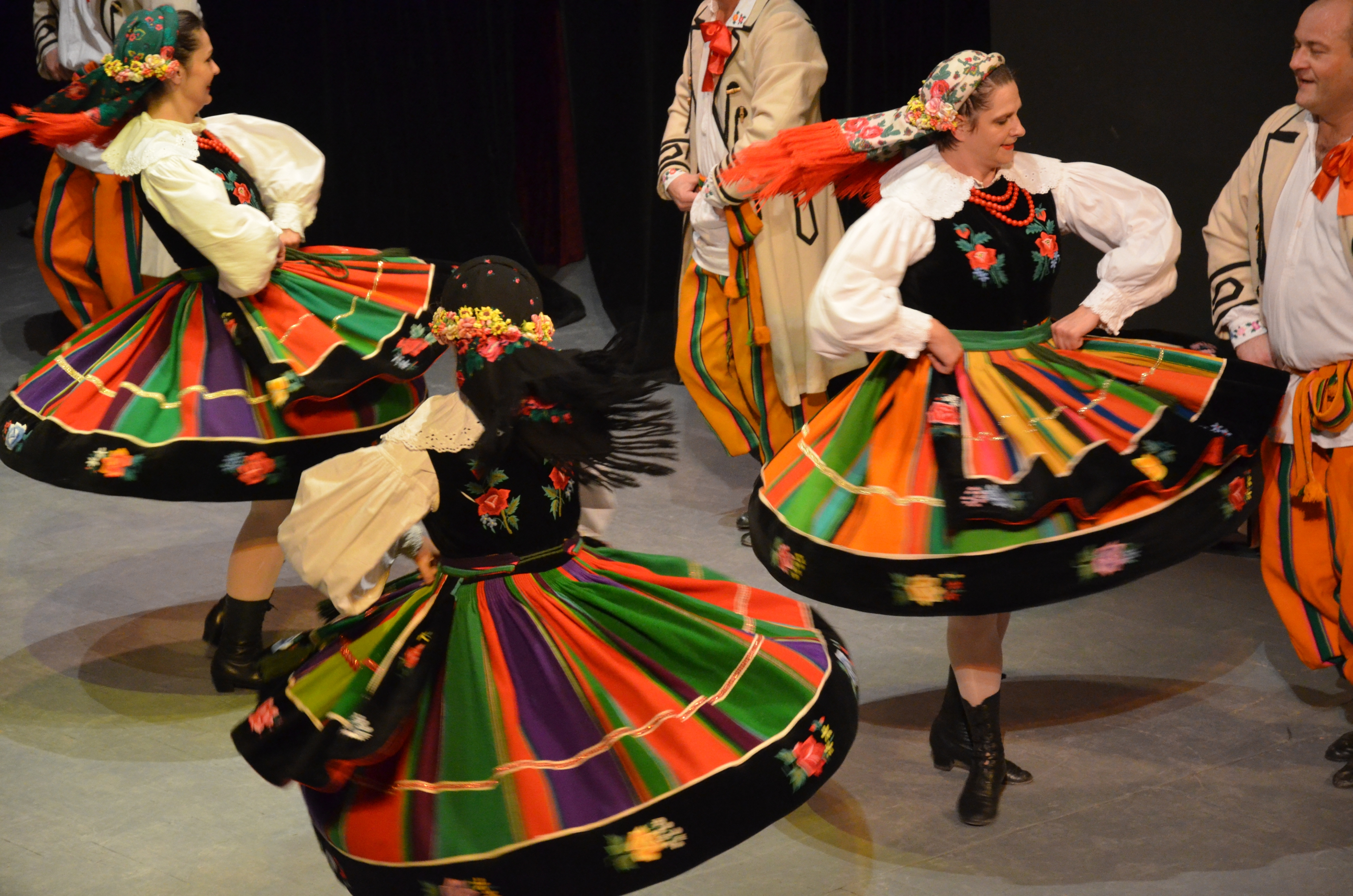
Women dressed in Łowicz costume, spinning and performing the oberek.

== Polish-American oberek (social) ==
The Polish-American oberek is a social dance, originally brought to America by Polish immigrants in late 1800s and early 1900s. This social dance derives from the folk dance oberek; however, the steps are slightly altered and the music is slightly different. Obereks are played by Polka bands throughout the United States. It is the second-most popular dance in Polish-American music, after the polka.

== See also ==
- Mazurka
- Krakowiak
- Kujawiak
- Varsovienne
- Redowa
