= Krakowiak =

Polish folk dance

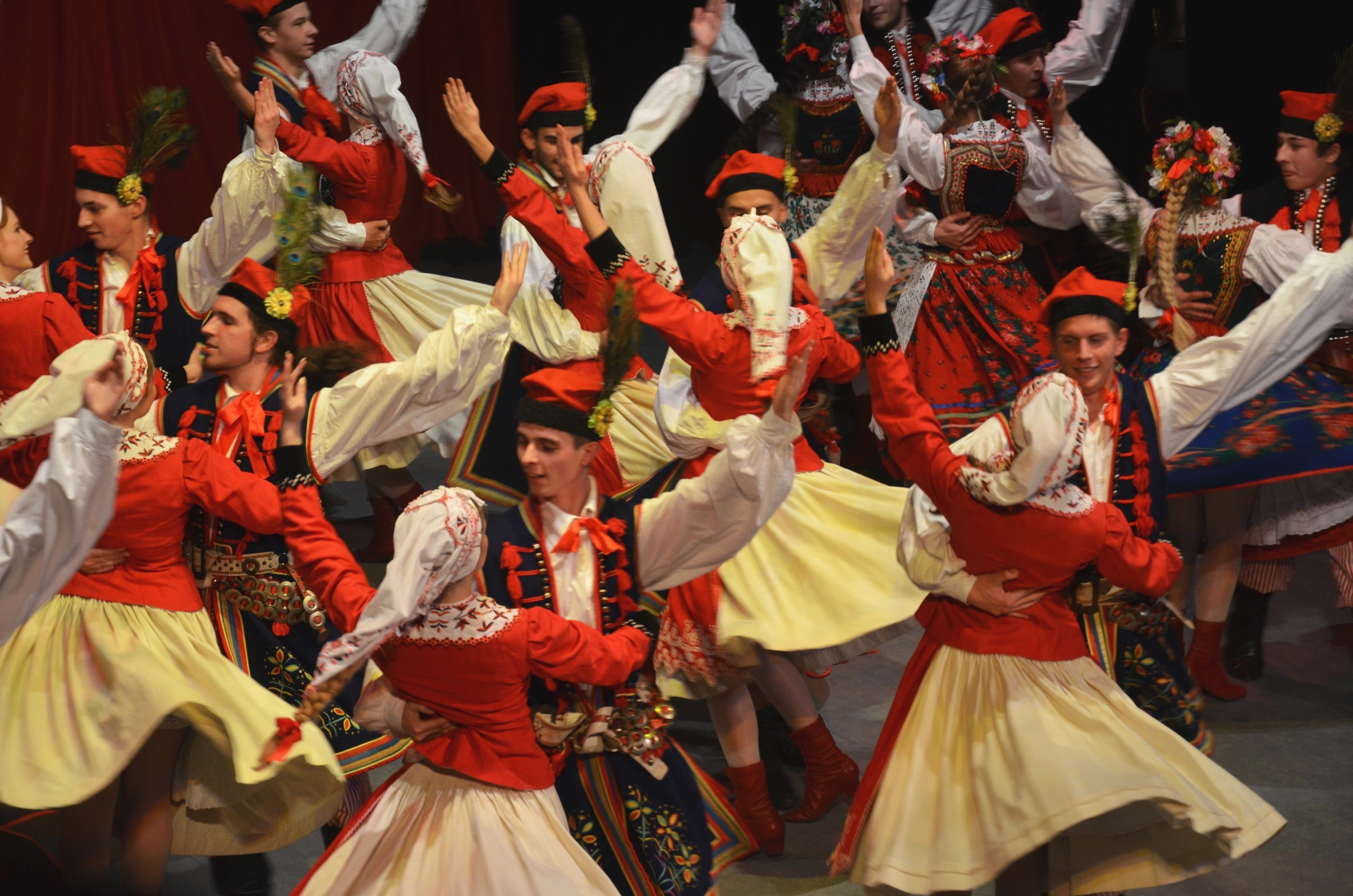
Folk dancers in traditional costumes from Kraków (regarded as Polish national costumes).

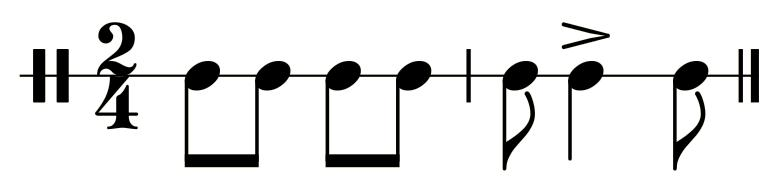
Krakowiak rhythm on score.

The Krakowiak or Cracovienne is a fast, syncopated Polish folk dance in duple time from the region of Kraków and Lesser Poland. The folk outfit worn for the dance has become the national costume of Poland, most notably, the rogatywka peaked hat with peacock feathers.

It became a popular ballroom dance in Vienna ("Krakauer") and Paris ("Cracovienne") where, with the polonaise and the mazurka, it signalled a Romantic sensibility of sympathy towards a picturesque, distant and oppressed nation.

The first printed Krakowiak appeared in Franciszek Mirecki's album for the piano, "Krakowiaks Offered to the Women of Poland" (Warsaw, 1816).

Frédéric Chopin produced a bravura concert krakowiak in his Grand Rondeau de Concert, Rondo à la Krakowiak in F major for piano and orchestra (Op. 14, 1828). The last movement of his first piano concerto also draws heavily on the dance.

In terms of its choreography, the krakowiak is set for several couples, among whom the leading male dancer sings and indicates the steps. According to the description in the New Grove Dictionary of Music and Musicians, the krakowiak is directed by the leading man from the first pair. As they approach the band, "the man, tapping his heels or dancing a few steps, sings a melody from an established repertory with newly improvised words addressed to his partner. The band follows the melody, and the couples move off in file and form a circle (with the leading couple back at the band). Thereafter verses are sung and played in alternation, the couples circulating during the played verses.

== See also ==
- Polish folk dances
- Polonaise
- Oberek
- Kujawiak
- Mazurka
