= Mazur (dance) =

Polish dance

The Mazur is a Polish folk and ballroom dance with origins in the region of Mazovia. It is one of the five Polish national dances.

== History ==
The Mazur was known in Poland already in the 15th century and by the 17th century it became a popular court dance.

== Dance ==
The Mazur is performed in 3/4 or 3/8 time and lively tempo. It is characterized by its tendency to accent the second or third beat and a rhythmic figure of a 4-syllable group, consisting of two quavers (eighth notes) and two crotchets (quarter notes), and is a joyful, dynamic dance. The man leading the Mazur is called a "wodzirej".

== See also ==
- Mazurka
