= Redowa =

Dance of Czech origin

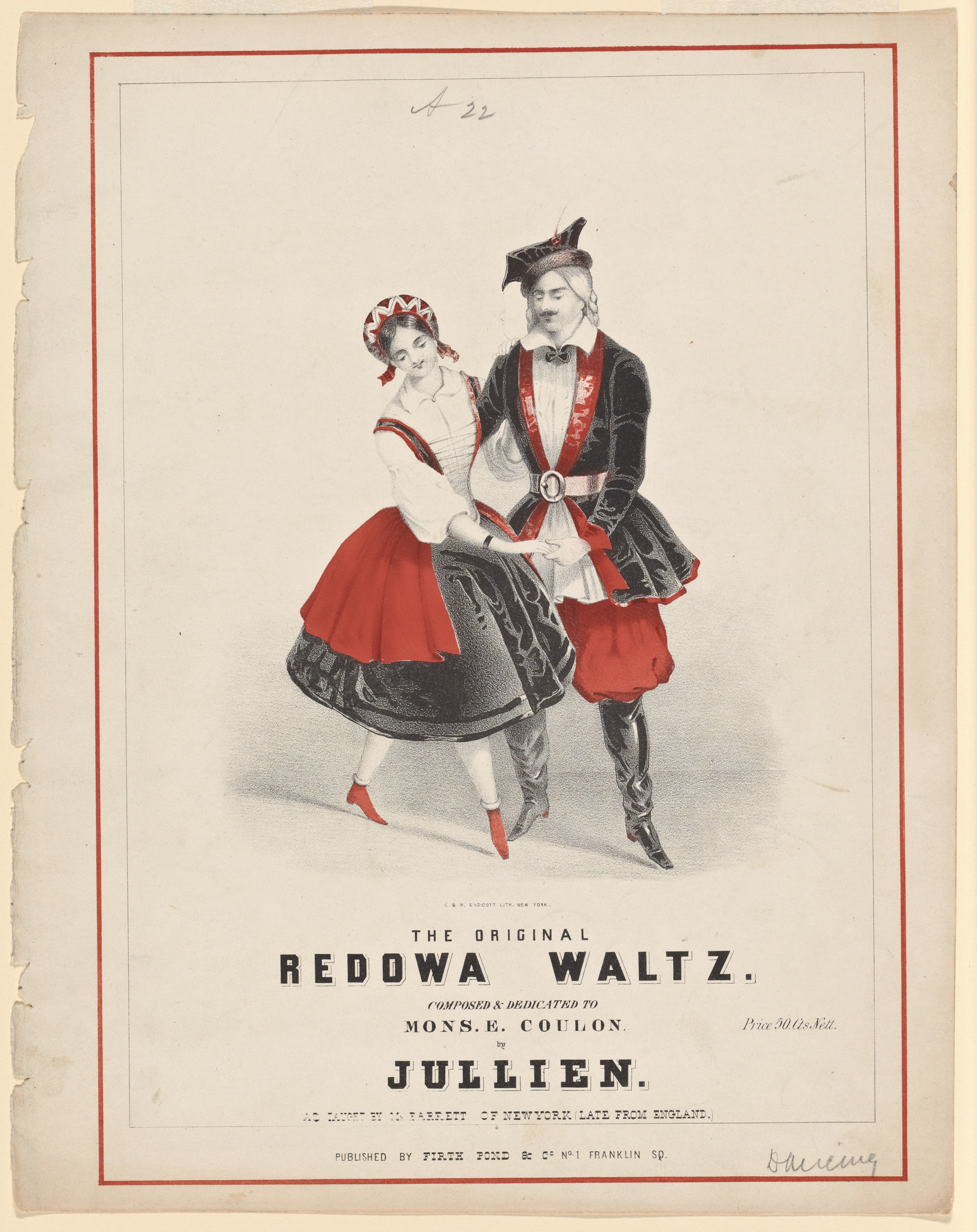
"The original Redowa waltz", by Jullien

A redowa (/ˈrɛdəwə, -və/) is a dance of Czech origin with turning, leaping waltz steps that was popular in European ballrooms.

== History ==
The name comes from the Czech name rejdovák, derived from rej ("whirl"). Originally a folk dance, it first appeared into the salons in Prague in 1829 and fell out of fashion by 1840, though in the meantime it had spread beyond Bohemia.

Thomas Hillgrove states that the redowa was introduced to London ballrooms in 1846. Like other popular ballroom dances of the mid-nineteenth century, including the polka, it was danced in Paris prior to its appearance in London.

As late as 1890, Russian composer Nikolay Rimsky-Korsakov included a "Redowa" as part of dance music in the score for his opera-ballet, Mlada, the action of which takes place during the ninth or tenth century in Slavic lands along the Baltic coast.

== Meter ==
Like most dances currently described as waltzes, the redowa is danced in 3/4 time, with the couple performing a full rotation every six beats.

== Description ==
A basic redowa step contains one long reaching step and two small leap-steps. The long reaching step can be danced on either the 1 or the 2 of each bar of music, depending on what feels best with the tune that is playing.

Cellarius (1849) describes a three-part redowa consisting of a pursuit part ("la poursuite"), followed by the style of waltz commonly described as the redowa, and ending with a particular type of valse à deux temps. During the "pursuit" the partners hold each other hands facing each other and moving up and down at will and doing the "balance" forward and back, with lady following the cavalier.

=== The lead ===
Dancers generally start in closed (waltz) position with the outside hands pointing line of direction. (This description is for the case when the "reach" step is on count two.) To begin a redowa, the leader will take a small leap step (count 1) around in front of his/her partner with the left foot so that the leader is backing, then take a long scooping or gliding step (count 2) straight back with the right (pointing right toe, bending the knee of the left leg, keeping the torso upright), followed by another small leap step (count 3) with the left to complete a 180-degree turn clockwise. The second half of the six-count pattern begins with a small leaping step (count 4) along the line of dance, so the leader faces forward on the line of dance. The left leg now reaches straight forward (count 5; pointing left toe, bending right knee, etc.), directly under the partner's right leg, which is extended back. A small leap (count 6) onto the right foot completes the pattern, completing the second half (180 degree) turn in preparation for the next six count pattern.

=== The follow ===
The follow is the opposite portion of the lead's sequence. The follower's movement on the first three beats are essentially the same movements the leader makes on the second set of three beats, and vice versa.

== See also ==
- Vintage dance
- Historical dance
- Mazurka
- Varsovienne
- Media related to Redowa at Wikimedia Commons
