= Triple metre =

Musical metre of three beats

Triple metre (US: triple meter; also known as triple time) is a musical metre characterised by a primary division of 3 beats to the bar, usually indicated by 3 (simple) or 9 (compound) in the upper figure of the time signature, with 3/4, 3/8 and 9/8 being the most common examples. In these signatures, beats form groups of three, establishing a triple meter feel in the music or song. The upper figure being divisible by three does not of itself indicate triple metre; for example, a time signature of 6/8 usually indicates compound duple metre, and similarly 12/8 usually indicates compound quadruple metre.

Shown below are a simple and a compound triple drum pattern.

== Stylistic differences ==
In popular music, the metre is most often quadruple, but this does not mean that triple metre does not appear.

In jazz, this and other more adventurous metres have become more common since Dave Brubeck's album Time Out. One noteworthy example of a jazz classic that employs triple metre is John Coltrane's version of "My Favorite Things".

Triple time is common in formal dance styles, for example the sarabande, the minuet, the mazurka, the waltz, the polonaise and others.

Triple metre is rare in national anthems – the national anthems of Austria, the United Kingdom, Switzerland, Greece, and the United States being notable exceptions.

=== Afro ===
Afro, a Cuban folkloric genre, is typically performed in triple metre using the batá drum.

=== 3-Step ===
The term " three-step" to refer to music was initially coined in the mid-2010s by gqom record producers (Sbucardo and Citizen Boy) to describe as well as another name for the South African genre, gqom due to its beat structure associated with triple metre. As the genre gained mainstream popularity and evolved, incorporating a wide range of music production techniques and more styles, other gqom record producers (Emo Kid, DJ Lag, Ben Myster and Menzi) introduced, pioneered and developed a distinct variation of gqom music between the late 2010s and early 2020s known as "3-step" (also referred to as 3 step, three-step, and other variants). The gqom subgenre is characterised by its gqom elements combined with triple metre and broken beat features. Producers frequently blend 3-step with other production styles and musical genres.

=== Yoruba music ===
In Yoruba music, triple metre amongst other rhythms, creates a distinctive, flowing quality through a recurring cycle of three beats per measure. The rhythmic structure is commonly found in traditional Yoruba drum music and plays a significant role in shaping dance movements and ceremonial performances. Additionally, triple metre is evident in oríkì chants, where it enriches lyrical expression. Triple metre, in Yoruba music plays a crucial role in cultural and ceremonial contexts.

== See also ==
- Duple and quadruple metre
- Triple step
- Waltz
