= Varsovienne =

Dance

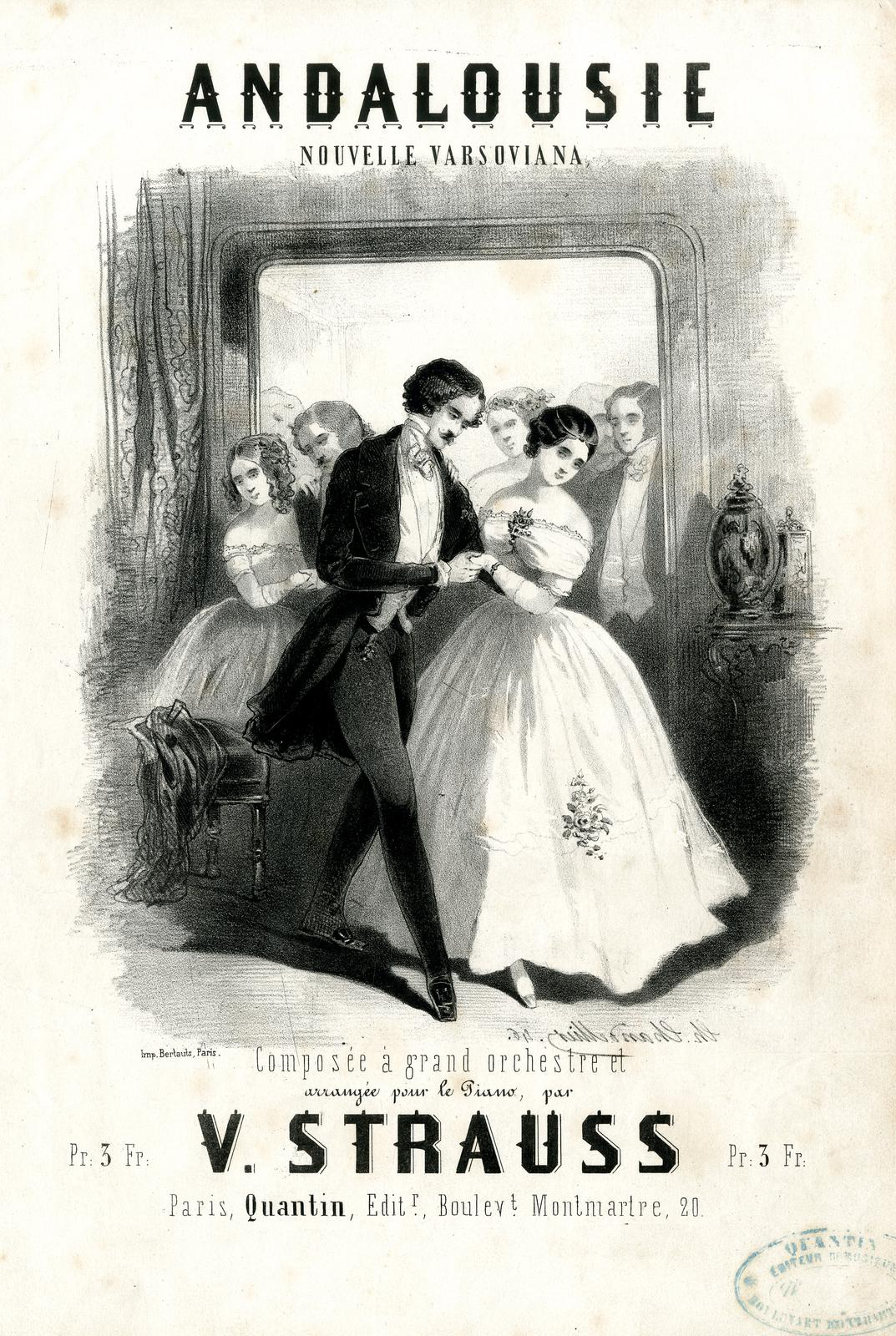
Piano sheet music for the varsovienne

The Varsoviana is both a couple dance and a melody. Whilst originally conceived as a mazurka (with its characteristic 3/4 time and accent on the 2nd or 3rd beat) it is now regularly mislabeled as a waltz (even being known as The Waltz of Vienna).

The Varsoviana is known by a variety of variations of its name (such as the Varsouvienne, Varsovienne or La Va), but it also has names which reference the distinctive 'pause' motif in the dance (such as Shoe the Donkey, Put your Little Foot, Cock your Leg Up) as well as titles that refer to songs which have come to be associated with the tune (e.g. Jan Pierewiet, Mascando Chicote, Turkey Rhubarb).

The dance and melody is known across Europe, North America, South America and Australasia. It is one of the most well known and long lived of all the 19th century 'round' couple dances, it was one of the earliest ever "sequence" dances. Its longevity is possibly due to its distinctive choreography, in particular the novelty (for that time) of having a pause motif in the dance. The pause motif which marks out all versions of the Varsoviana dance, usually through a point of the toe or heel held for one of two beats, also makes it more difficult to relocate the dance to a different tune, perhaps protecting the association between dance choreography and melody.

The earliest reference to the creation of 'La Varsoviana' is a French newspaper Journal Des Faits. The article notes that it is intended that a new ballroom dance 'La Varsoviana' will be premiered at the Salle Paganini (Paris) that very evening – 2 November 1852. The music, and most probably the choreography too was composed by an obscure Spanish-born composer Francisco Alonso (1822–1876). At the time there were a number of mazurkas in circulation bearing as their title some variant of Warsaw. Poland was at this point under occupation by Russia and Frédéric Chopin amongst others was popularising Poland's right to sovereignty by promoting Mazurkas, a tempo strongly associated with Poland. Dr Middleton-Metcalfe, following Maurice Brown has pointed out that by 1852 the word "Varsoviana" (and its variants) was perhaps even being used interchangeably with "Mazurka", to indicate a piece in ¾ timing with an accent on the second or third beat.

Contrary to much commentary in circulation today is evidence to suggest that Alonso originally envisioned his piece as a Spanish (rather than Polish) themed piece. Whatever his intention, the music and dance proved to be popular, eventually surpassing other older 'Varsvovianas' to become the only one. The music and dance quickly spread to London. By November 1853 a variant arranged by a rival composer Alphonse Leduc entitled Varsoviana Nationale was being advertised for sale in London. This piano music featured a woman in distinctive Polish style dress, indicating that Alonso's original Spanish theme was already obscured. Leduc's piano music contains the first written description of the dance in English:

Leduc's instructions are for a dance with two parts totalling 16 bars. The brief instructions for the first figure, described as the 'Varsoviana' are: 'The gentleman makes a glissé with the left foot, then a coupé with the right foot, a jeté with the left foot & an assemblé with the right foot, making a pause.' Leduc's second figure is made up of one four bar motif repeated twice. It is described as 'The ordinary step of the Polka Mazurka or Redowa' with a pause in the fourth bar. "The gentleman makes a glissé with the left foot, then a coupé with the right foot, a jeté with the left foot & an assemblé with the right foot, making a pause."

The Varsoviana travelled across the world, and there are concomitantly many different minor variations on the music and the dance which have been collected. In North America it was an important part of the 'Old Time' dance repertoire, as popularised by Henry Ford, Varsoviana was one of the couple dances used as interludes amongst quadrille or square formation dances. Even into the 1970s it was still regularly danced in Britain, most latterly often (though not always) under the auspices of the British Old Time dance movement. In Ireland as 'Shoe the Donkey' it is currently experiencing renewed interest as part of the revival of couple dances in Donegal.

== Uses ==
Henry Ford's Dance Orchestra recorded a piece titled Varsovienne.

The Albion Dance Band recorded a varsoviana tune on their 1977 album The Prospect Before Us.

A varsoviana tune plays an important role in Tennessee Williams' play A Streetcar Named Desire.

Conrad Hilton danced the varsovienne as a type of ceremonial good luck ritual when he opened new hotels.
