= Mazurka =

Polish lively triple-meter musical form with accents on beats two and three

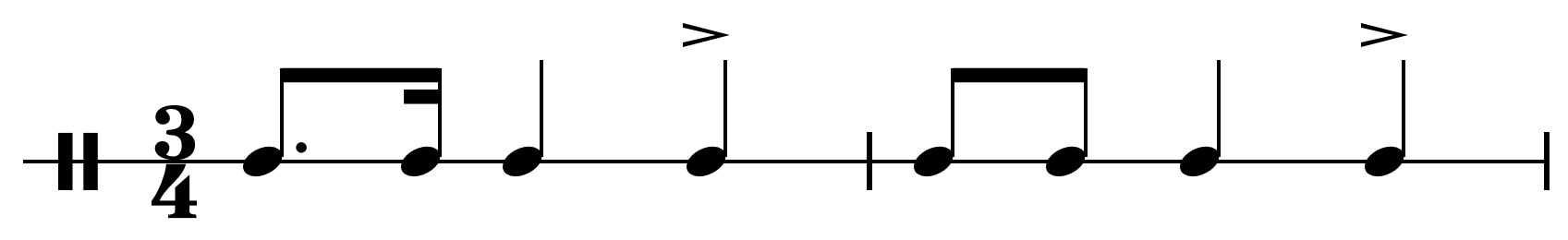
Mazur rhythm.

Opus 17, No. 4: Mazurka No. 13, in A minor by Chopin
Performed by Donald Betts

Opus 33, No. 3: Mazurka No. 24, in D major by Chopin
performed by Lubka Kolessa

Mazurka by Claude Debussy
Claude Debussy's Mazurka

Mazurka, from Northern California
Mazurka, played on harmonica by Aaron Morgan and recorded by Sidney Robertson Cowell in 1939.

The mazurka (Polish: mazurek, GEN. mazurka) is a Polish musical form based on stylised folk dances in triple metre, usually at a lively tempo, with character defined mostly by the prominent mazur's "strong accents unsystematically placed on the second or third beat".

The mazurka, alongside the polka dance, became popular in 19th-century European ballrooms and salons, particularly through notable works by Frédéric Chopin. The mazurka (in Polish mazur, the same word as the mazur) and mazurek (rural dance based on the mazur) are often confused in western literature as the same musical form.

== History ==
The folk origins of the Mazurka are three Polish folk dances which are:

- mazur, most characteristic due to its inconsistent rhythmic accents,
- slow and melancholic kujawiak,
- fast oberek.

The mazurka is always found to have either a triplet, trill, dotted eighth note (quaver) pair, or an ordinary eighth note pair before two quarter notes (crotchets). In the 19th century, the form became popular in many ballrooms in different parts of Europe.

Mazurka as a term denoting a music piece originated in France, and is connected to the name of the mazur dance. Until the mid-20th century, Mazur also signified an inhabitant of Mazovia, while Mazurka meant a Mazovian woman in the past. Mazurek is a diminutive and masculine form of Mazur. In relation to dance, all three words (mazur, mazurek, mazurka) underline the connection to Mazovia. Apart from that, the word mazurek refers to various terms in Polish, e.g. a cake, a bird and a popular surname.

Mazurek is also a rural dance identified by some as the oberek. It is said oberek is a danced variation of the sung mazurek, the latter also having more prominent accents on second and third beats and less fluent of a rhythmical flow, which is so characteristical of oberek.

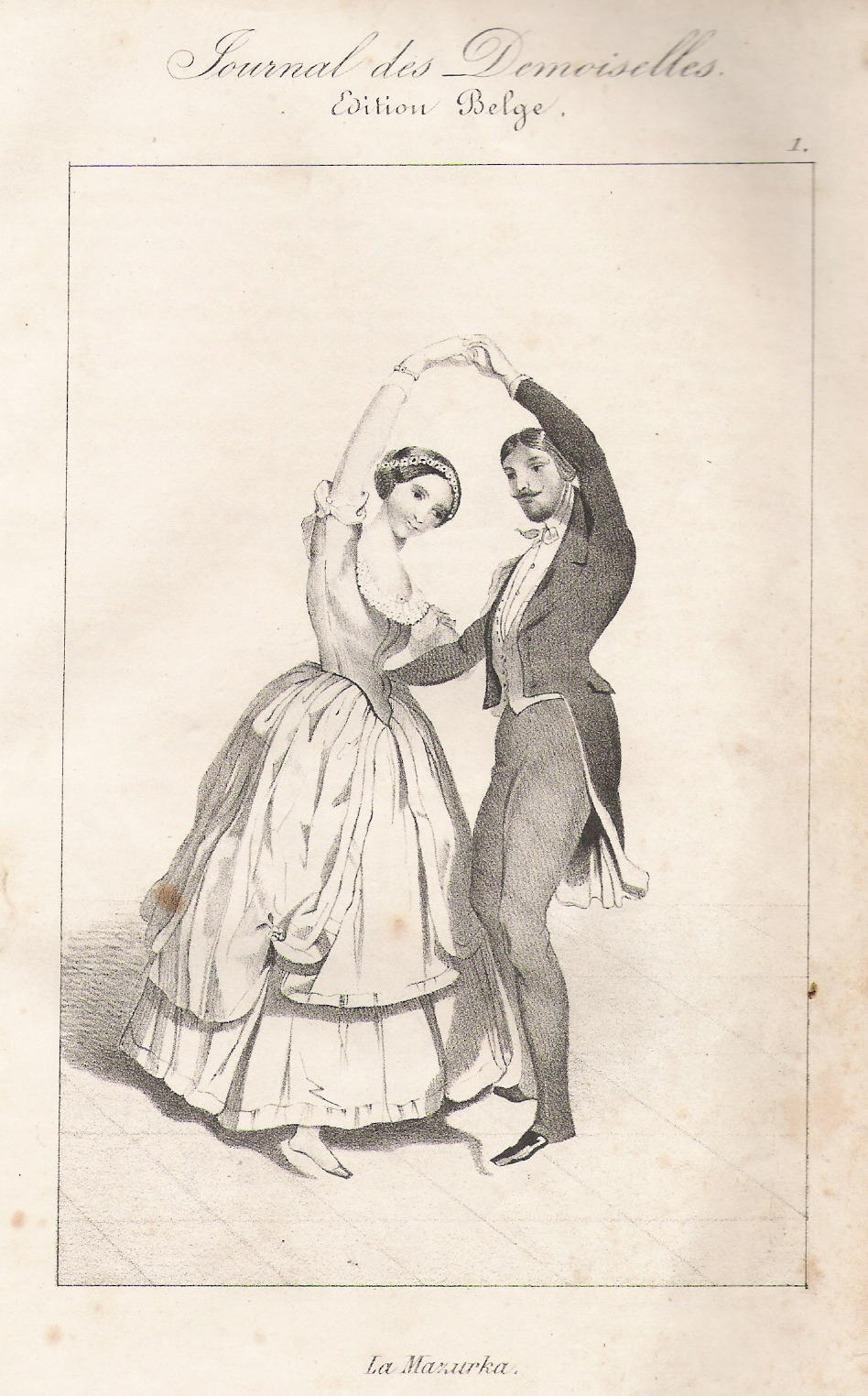
Mazurka; 1845

Several classical composers have written mazurkas, with the best known being the 59 composed by Frédéric Chopin for solo piano. In 1825, Maria Szymanowska wrote the largest collection of piano mazurkas published before Chopin. Henryk Wieniawski also wrote two for violin with piano (the popular "Obertas", Op. 19), Julian Cochran composed a collection of five mazurkas for solo piano and orchestra, and in the 1920s, Karol Szymanowski wrote a set of twenty for piano and finished his composing career with a final pair in 1934. Alexander Scriabin, who was at first conscious of being Chopin's follower, wrote 24 mazurkas.

Chopin first started composing mazurkas in 1824, reaching full maturity by 1830, the year of the November Uprising, a rebellion in Congress Poland against Russia. Chopin continued composing them until 1849, the year of his death. The stylistic and musical characteristics of his mazurkas differ from the traditional variety because Chopin in effect created a more complex type of mazurka, using classical techniques, including counterpoint and fugue. By including more chromaticism and harmony in the mazurkas, he made them more technically interesting than the traditional dances. Chopin also tried to compose his mazurkas (and waltzes) in such a way that they could not be used for dancing, so as to distance them from the original form.

However, while Chopin changed some aspects of the original mazurka, he maintained others. His mazurkas, like the traditional dances, contain a great deal of repetition: repetition of certain measures or groups of measures; of entire sections; and of an initial theme. The rhythm of his mazurkas also remains very similar to that of earlier mazurkas. However, Chopin also incorporated the rhythmic elements of the two other Polish forms mentioned above, the kujawiak and oberek; his mazurkas usually feature rhythms from more than one of these three forms (mazurek, kujawiak, and oberek). This use of rhythm suggests that Chopin tried to create a genre that had ties to the original form, but was still something new and different.

The mazurka began as a dance for either four or eight couples. Eventually, Michel Fokine created a female solo mazurka dance dominated by flying grandes jetés, alternating second and third arabesque positions, and split-leg climactic postures.

== Outside Poland ==
The form was common as a popular dance in Europe and the United States in the mid to late nineteenth century.

=== Cape Verde Islands ===
In Cape Verde, the mazurka is also revered as an important cultural phenomenon played with acoustic bands led by a violinist and accompanied by guitarists. It also takes a variation of the mazurka dance form and is found mostly in the north of the archipelago, mainly in São Nicolau, Santo Antão. In the south it finds popularity in the island of Brava.

=== Czechia ===
Czech composers Bedřich Smetana, Antonín Dvořák, and Bohuslav Martinů all wrote mazurkas to at least some extent. For Smetana and Martinů, these are single pieces (respectively, a Mazurka-Cappricio for piano and a Mazurka-Nocturne for a mixed string/wind quartet), whereas Dvořák composed a set of six mazurkas for piano, and a mazurka for violin and orchestra.

=== France ===
In France, the Romantic composer Camille Saint-Saëns wrote three mazurkas: Op. 21 in G minor, Op. 24 in G minor, and Op. 66 in B minor. Impressionistic composers Claude Debussy and Maurice Ravel both wrote mazurkas; Debussy's is a stand-alone piece, and Ravel's is part of a suite of an early work, La Parade. Jacques Offenbach included a mazurka in his ballet Gaîté Parisienne; Léo Delibes composed one which appears several times in the first act of his ballet Coppélia. The mazurka appears frequently in French traditional folk music. In the French Antilles, the mazurka has become an important style of dance and music.

A creolised version of the mazurka is mazouk which—beginning around 1979 in Paris—morphed into the globally popular dance style “zouk” developed in France and popularised by Paris's Island-creole supergroup Kassav'; mazouk had been introduced to the French Caribbean in the late 1800s. In the 21st century in Brazil and the Afro-Caribbean diaspora, zouk (and its progenitor band Kassav') remains very popular. In popular 20th century folk dancing in France, the Polish/classical-piano (see Chopin) mazurka evolved into mazouk, a dance at a more gentle pace (without the traditional 'hop' step on the 3rd beat), fostering more-intimate dancing and associating mazouk with a "seduction" dance (see also tango from Argentina). This "sexy" style of mazurka has also been imported to “balfolk" dancing in Belgium and the Netherlands, hence the name "Belgian Mazurka" or "Flemish Mazurka". Perhaps the most enduring style of intimate dancing music of this origin moved zouk from the 1980s–2000s into its wildly popular (especially in Brazil and Africa) slow-dancing variant called zouk love, which remains a staple of French-Caribbean dance venues in Paris and elsewhere.

=== Ireland ===
Mazurkas constitute a distinctive part of the traditional dance music of County Donegal, Ireland. As a couple's dance, it is no longer popular. The Polish dance entered Ireland in the 1840s, but is not widely played outside of Donegal. Unlike the Polish mazurek, which may have an accent on the second or third beat of a bar, the Irish mazurka (masúrca in the Irish language) is consistently accented on the second beat, giving it a unique feel. Musician Caoimhín Mac Aoidh has written a book on the subject, From Mazovia to Meenbanad: The Donegal Mazurkas, in which the history of the musical and dance form is related. Mac Aoidh tracked down 32 different mazurkas as played in Ireland.

=== Italy ===
Mazurkas are part of Italian popular music including the Liscio style. Typical of Italian mazurkas are groups of triplets, strong dotted rhythms, and phrase endings of two accented quarter notes and a rest, unlike a waltz.

=== Brazil ===
In Brazil, the composer Ernesto Nazareth wrote a Chopinesque mazurka called "Mercedes" in 1917. Heitor Villa-Lobos wrote a mazurka for classical guitar in a similar musical style to Polish mazurkas.

=== Cuba ===
In Cuba, composer Ernesto Lecuona wrote a piece titled Mazurka en Glisado for the piano, one of various commissions throughout his life.

=== Nicaragua ===
In Nicaragua, Carlos Mejía Godoy y los de Palacaguina and Los Soñadores de Saraguasca made a compilation of mazurkas from popular folk music, which are performed with a violin de talalate, an indigenous instrument from Nicaragua.

=== Curaçao ===
In Curaçao the mazurka was popular as dance music in the nineteenth century, as well as in the first half of the twentieth century. Several Curaçao-born composers, such as Jan Gerard Palm, Joseph Sickman Corsen, Jacobo Palm, Rudolph Palm and Wim Statius Muller, have written mazurkas.

=== Mexico ===
In Mexico, composers Ricardo Castro and Manuel M Ponce wrote mazurkas for the piano in a Chopin fashion, eventually mixing elements of Mexican folk dances.

=== Paraguay ===
The Paraguayan guitarist and composer Agustín Barrios wrote the Mazurka Appassionata around 1919.

=== Philippines ===
In the Philippines, the mazurka is a popular form of traditional dance. The Mazurka Boholana is one well-known Filipino mazurka.

=== Portugal ===
In Portugal the mazurka became one of the most popular traditional European dances through the first years of the annual Andanças, a traditional dances festival held nearby Castelo de Vide.

=== Russia ===
In Russia, many composers wrote mazurkas for solo piano: Scriabin (26), Balakirev (7), Tchaikovsky (6). Borodin wrote two in his Petite Suite for piano; Mikhail Glinka also wrote two, although one is a simplified version of Chopin's Mazurka No. 13. Tchaikovsky also included mazurkas in his scores for Swan Lake, Eugene Onegin, and Sleeping Beauty. Rachmaninoff's Morceaux de salon Op. 10 includes a Mazurka in D-flat major as its 7th piece. Prokofiev wrote a Mazurka for orchestra in his ballet Cinderella, which is also included in his Cinderella Suite No. 1.

The mazurka was a common dance at the balls of the Russian Empire and it is depicted in many Russian novels and films. In addition to its mention in Leo Tolstoy's Anna Karenina as well as in a protracted episode in War and Peace, the dance is prominently featured in Ivan Turgenev's novel Fathers and Sons. Arkady reserves the mazurka for Madame Odintsov with whom he is falling in love. During Russian balls, it was danced elegantly and famously by the Tsarina Maria Feodorovna, the second-to-last tsarina of the Russian empire before its collapse in 1918.

=== Sweden ===
In Swedish folk music, the quaver or eight-note polska has a similar rhythm to the mazurka, and the two dances have a common origin. The international version of the mazurka was also introduced under that name during the nineteenth century.

=== United States ===
The mazurka survives in some old-time fiddle tunes, and also in early Cajun music, though it has largely fallen out of Cajun music now. In the Southern United States it was sometimes known as a "mazuka". Polish Mazurka was danced in upstate New York in the 1950s and 1960s (similarly to the krakowiak, millennium of Christianity) in Polish community centers or social clubs, which can be found throughout the US. The polka remains the best known Polish dance and is regularly seen at weddings, dance halls and public events (e.g., summers outdoors, barn dances) in the US.

==== California ====
In addition to being part of the repertoire of Irish traditional music sessions, the mazurka has been played by a wide variety of cultural groups in California. The mazurka first came to Alta California during the Spanish period and danced among Californios. Later, the renowned guitarist Manuel Y. Ferrer, who was born in Baja California to Spanish parents and learned guitar from a Franciscan friar in Santa Barbara but made his career in the San Francisco Bay Area, arranged mazurkas for the guitar. During the early 20th century, the mazurka became part of the repertoire of Italian American musicians in San Francisco playing in the ballo liscio style. Pianist Sid LeProtti, an important Oakland-born early jazz musician on the west coast, stated that before jazz took off, he and other musicians in Barbary Coast clubs played mazurkas in addition to waltzes, two-steps, marches, polkas, and schottisches. One mazurka, played on harmonica, was collected by Sidney Robertson Cowell for the WPA California Folk Music Project in 1939 in Tuolumne County.

== See also ==
- Mazur (dance)
- Bourrée
- Fandango
- Ländler
- Mazurkas (Chopin)
- Polish music
- Polonaise (dance)
- Polska (dance)
- Waltz
- Pols

== Bibliography ==
- Downes, Stephen. "Mazurka" Grove Music Online. Oxford Music Online. 17 November 2009.
- Hrbková, Šárka B. "Slavonic Words in English" in Slavonic Studies & Notes Vol. 2 no. 3 (Sept. 1920): 1-3.
- Kallberg, Jeffrey. "The problem of repetition and return in Chopin's mazurkas." Chopin Styles, ed. Jim Samson. Cambridge, England: Cambridge University Press, 1988.
- Kallberg, Jeffrey. "Chopin's Last Style." Journal of the American Musicological Society 38.2 (1985): 264–315.
- Michałowski, Kornel, and Jim Samson. "Chopin, Fryderyk Franciszek" Grove Music Online. Oxford Music Online. 17 November 2009. (esp. section 6, "Formative Influences")
- Milewski, Barbara. "Chopin's Mazurkas and the Myth of the Folk." 19th-Century Music 23.2 (1999): 113–35.
- Rosen, Charles. The Romantic Generation. Cambridge, Massachusetts: Harvard University Press, 1995.
- Winokur, Roselyn M. "Chopin and the Mazurka". Diss. Sarah Lawrence College, 1974.
