= 1963 in science fiction =

The year 1963 was marked, in science fiction, by the following:

== Events ==
- The first issue of Austrian science fiction magazine Quarber Merkur is published.
- The 21st annual Worldcon, Discon I, is held in Washington, D.C., USA

== Births and deaths ==
=== Births ===
- Liu Cixin
- Satoshi Kon
- Lola Robles
- Scott Westerfeld

=== Deaths ===
- Aldous Huxley
- C.S. Lewis
- Frank R. Paul
- Jacques Spitz

== Literary releases ==
=== Novels ===
- Cat's Cradle, by Kurt Vonnegut
- The Man Who Fell to Earth, by Walter Tevis
- Planet of the Apes, (La Planète des singes), by Pierre Boulle

=== Short stories ===
- "A Rose for Ecclesiastes", by Roger Zelazny

=== Comics ===
- First appearance of 8 Man, created by Kazumasa Hirai and Jiro Kuwata, in Weekly Shonen Magazine
- Magnus Robot Fighter, 4000 A.D. #1, created by Russ Manning and published by Gold Key Comics
- X-Men #1, created by Jack Kirby and Stan Lee, published by Marvel Comics

== Movies ==
- The Day of the Triffids, dir. by Steve Sekely
- The Nutty Professor, dir. by Jerry Lewis

== Television ==
- Doctor Who
- The Outer Limits

== Awards ==
=== Hugos ===
- Best novel: The Man in the High Castle, by Philip K. Dick
- Best short fiction: "The Dragon Masters", by Jack Vance
- Best dramatic presentation: No winner chosen
- Best professional magazine: The Magazine of Fantasy & Science Fiction, ed. by Robert P. Mills and Avram Davidson
- Best professional artist: Roy G. Krenkel
- Best fanzine: Xero, ed. by Richard A. Lupoff and Pat Lupoff
