= Regency dance =

Historical dances from 1790 to 1825

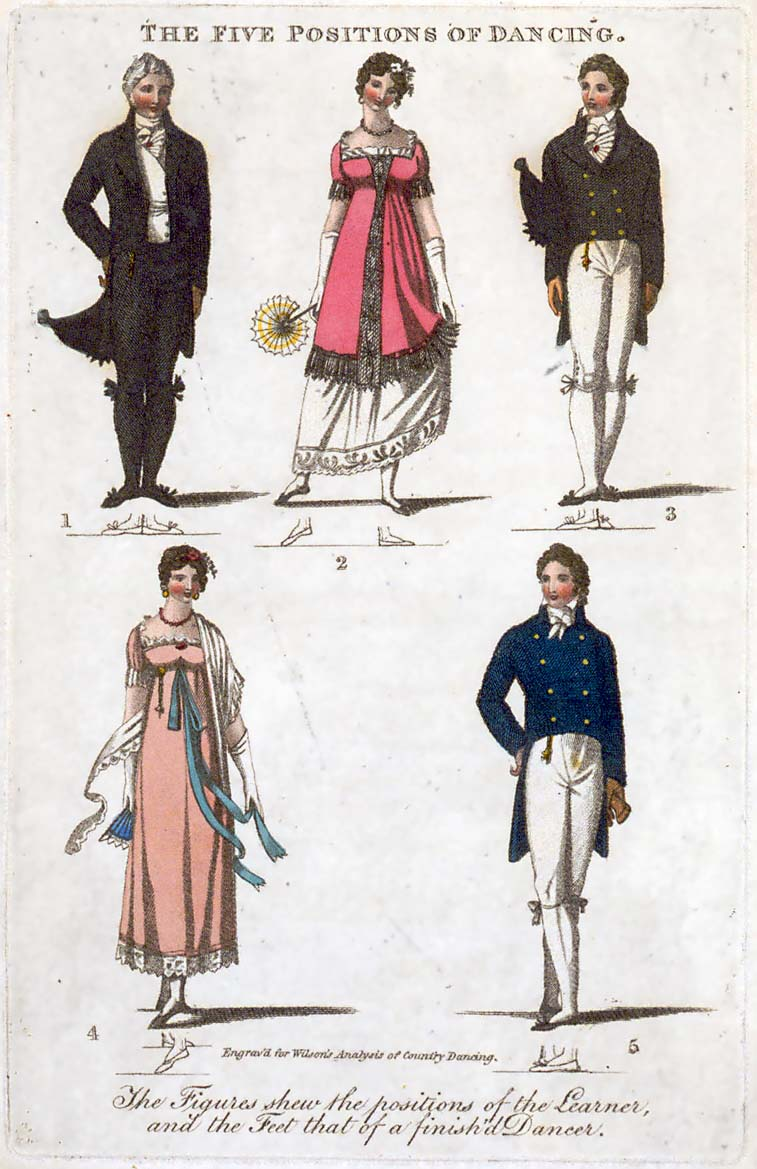
The five positions of Dancing. T. Wilson's Analysis of Country Dancing instruction manual, 1811.

Regency dance is the term for historical dances of the period ranging roughly from 1790 to 1825.

Most popular exposure to this era of dance comes in the works of Jane Austen. Balls occur in her novels and are discussed in her letters, but specifics are few. Films based on her works tend to incorporate modern revival English Country Dance; however, they rarely incorporate dances actually of the period and do them without the appropriate footwork and social style which make them accurate to the period. Dances of this era were lively and bouncy, not the smooth and stately style seen in films. Steps ranging from simple skipping to elaborate ballet-style movements were used.

In the early part of this period, up to the early 1810s, the ballroom was dominated by the country dance, the cotillion, and the scotch reel.

In the longways Country Dance, a line of couples perform figures with each other, progressing up and down the line. Regency country dances were often proceeded by a brief March by the couples, then begun by the top lady in the set and her partner, who would dance down the set to the bottom. Each couple in turn as they reached the top would likewise dance down until the entire set had returned to its original positions. This could be a lengthy process, easily taking an hour in a long set. An important social element was the calling of the dance by the leading lady (a position of honor), who would determine the figures, steps, and music to be danced. The rest of the set would listen to the calling dancing master or pick up the dance by observing the leading couple. Austen mentions in her letters instances in which she and her partner called the dance.

The cotillion was a French import, performed in a square using more elaborate footwork. It consisted of a "chorus" figure unique to each dance which was danced alternately with a standard series of up to ten "changes", which were simple figures such as a right hand moulinet (star) common to cotillions in general.

The scotch reel of the era consisted of alternate heying (interlacing) and setting (fancy steps danced in place) by a line of three or four dancers. More complex reels appear in manuals as well but it's unclear if they ever actually caught on. A sixsome reel is mentioned in a description of Scottish customs in the early 1820s and eightsome reels (danced in squares like cotillions) occur in some dance manuscripts of the era.

In the 1810s, the era of the Regency proper, English dance began an important transition with the introduction of the quadrille and the waltz.

The Waltz was first imported to England around 1810, but it was not considered socially acceptable until continental visitors at the post-Napoleonic-Wars celebrations danced it in London—and even then it remained the subject of anti-waltz diatribes, caricatures, and jokes. Even the decadent Lord Byron was scandalized by the prospect of people "embracing" on the dance floor. The Regency version is relatively slow, and done up on the balls of the feet with the arms in a variety of graceful positions. The Sauteuse is a leaping waltz commonly done in 2/4 rather than 3/4 time, similar in pattern (leap-glide-close) to the Redowa and Waltz Galop of the later nineteenth century.

First imported from France by Lady Jersey in 1815, the Quadrille was a shorter version of the earlier cotillions. Figures from individual cotillions were assembled into sets of five or six figures, and the changes were left out, producing much shorter dances. By the late 1810s, it was not uncommon to dance a series of quadrilles during the evening, generally consisting of the same first three figures combined with a variety of different fourth and fifth figures. Jane Austen's niece Fanny danced quadrilles and in their correspondence Jane mentions that she finds them much inferior to the cotillions of her own youth.

By the late 1810s, under siege from the Quadrille, dancing masters began to invent "new" forms of country dance, often with figures borrowed from the Quadrille, and giving them exotic names such as the Danse Ecossoise and Danse Espagnuole which suggested entire new dances but actually covered very minor variations in the classic form. A few of these dances became sufficiently popular that they survived through the entire 19th century. One example of this is the "Spanish dance" popular in vintage dance circles, which is a solitary survivor of its entire genre of Regency-era dances.

== Periodization ==
Some feel that the popular use of the term "Regency dance" is not technically correct, as the actual English Regency (the future George IV ruling on behalf of King George III) lasted only from 1811 until 1820. However, the term "Regency" has been used to refer to a much broader period than the historical Regency for a very long time, particularly in areas such as the history of art and architecture, literature, and clothing. This is because there are consistencies of style over this period which make having a single term useful.

== Other popular dances of the era ==
"La Boulangere", the only dance mentioned by name in Jane Austen's writings, is a simple circle dance for a group of couples. Sir Roger de Coverly, mentioned by Charles Dickens, is the ancestor of America's Virginia Reel.

Numerous instruction manuals survive from the Regency era. Several by Thomas Wilson are in the US Library of Congress online collection. The Scotch Reel is described by Francis Peacock, whose manual is also available in the LC collection.

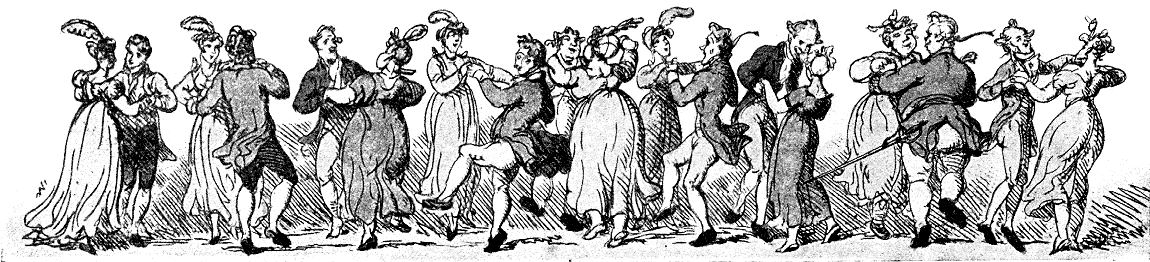
Caricature of longways dance by Rowlandson, second half of 1790s

== Revival ==
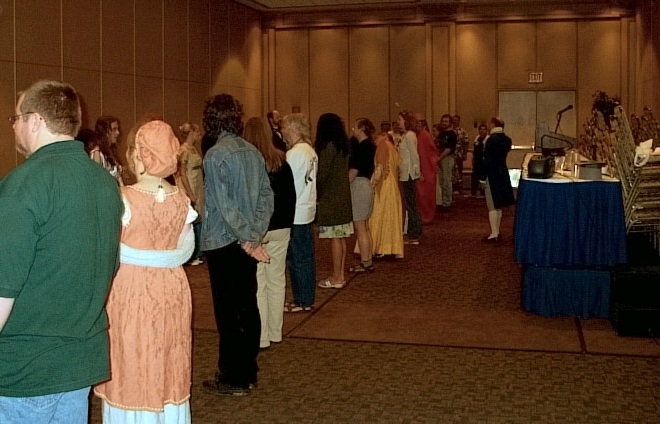
Regency Dance lessons at Westercon 58

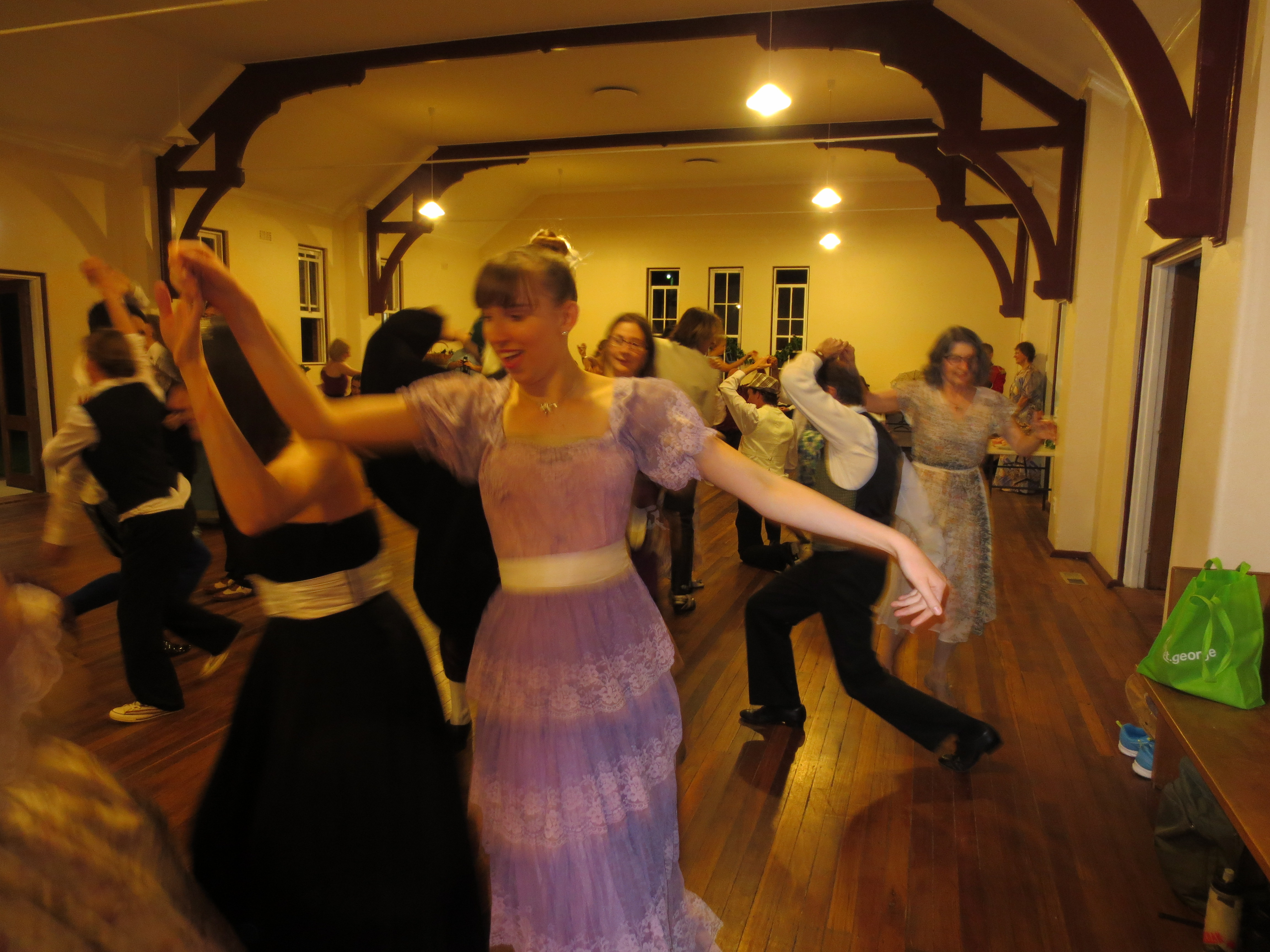
Dancing through the ages - Time Traveler Ball with dances from the 15th to 20th century

The first major revival of English Country Dance, one of the major types of Regency dance, was by Englishman Cecil Sharp in the early 20th century. Various other revivals have followed, most using at least some of Sharp's research. Today, there are many groups around the world which perform a variety of English period dances, including many of the types of dance which were popular during the English Regency.

Regency dance has gained popularity at science fiction conventions, in part due to the efforts of John Hertz. Reconstructed dances from the era are taught to newcomers and experienced dancers alike. Some authors—notably, Larry Niven—have added their personal enthusiasm to the trend.

In Silicon Valley, the Bay Area English Regency Society sponsors local dance classes and formal balls in churches, community centers, and other venues. In Los Angeles, California, the Valley Area English Regency Society hosts teas and Regency dance parties in a local church. Both societies were founded by Laura Brodian Freas Beraha. Some enthusiasts go to extremes: Cisco Systems founders Sandra Lerner and Len Bosack created a foundation that bought a Regency-era country house once owned by Jane Austen's brother. In Australia, Earthly Delights Historic Dance Academy and John Gardiner-Garden run a Regency Dance School in conjunction with Jane Austen Festival Australia every April.
