= Historical dance =

Western European-based dance types

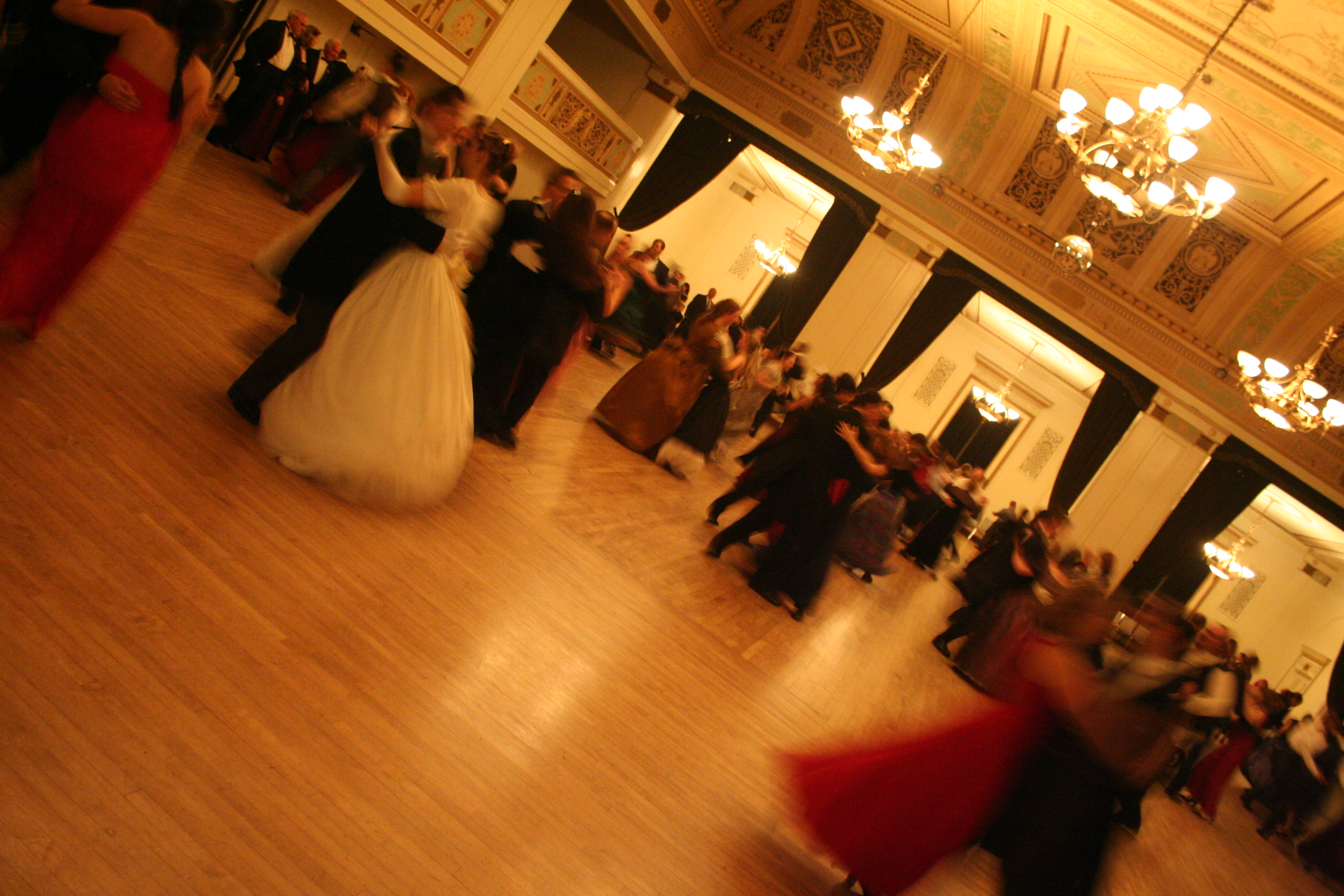
Victorian ballroom dances at the Gaskell Ball in Oakland, California

Historical dance (or early dance) is a term covering a wide variety of Western European-based dance types from the past as they are danced in the present. Today historical dances are danced as performance, for pleasure at themed balls or dance clubs, as historical reenactment, or for musicological or historical research.

Dances from the early 20th century can be recreated precisely, being within living memory and after the advent of film and video recording. Earlier dance types, however, must be reconstructed from less reliable evidence such as surviving notations and instruction manuals.

For performance dancing, see History of dance.

== Categories ==
=== Medieval dance ===
Very little evidence survives about medieval dance except what can be gleaned from paintings and works of literature from this time period. Some names of the dances which we know existed during the Middle Ages include Carole, Ductia, Estampie (Istampitta), Saltarello, and the Trotto. The farandole is also frequently presented as a medieval dance, based on surviving iconography.

=== Renaissance dance ===
The earliest surviving dance manuals come from the Renaissance period, including examples by Italian dance master and composer Fabritio Caroso and French cleric Thoinot Arbeau. Thus we are able to reconstruct the dances with a greater degree of certainty. The large number of dances with Spanish origin reflect the cultural influence of the dominating power of the age.

Dance types:

- Allemande (Almain)
- Basse danse (Bassadance)
- Branle (Bransle)
- Canario
- Coranto
- Dompe
- Galliard
- La volta, variation on the Galliard
- Pavane
- Sarabande
- Spagnoletta
- Tourdion, a fast Galliard

=== Baroque dance ===
It was during the baroque era that Londoner John Playford published The Dancing Master, which, along with similar publications, provides us with a large repertoire of baroque English country dances.

Apart from country dances, the most well-documented baroque dance style was that which was developed at the French court during the 17th century. The term "baroque dance" is often used to refer specifically to this style, reflecting the dominating power of the era.

Dance types include:

- Bourrée
- Canary
- Chaconne
- (French) Courante
- Entrée grave
- Forlana
- Gavotte
- Gigue
- Loure
- Menuet (minuet)
- Musette
- Passacaille (passacaglia)
- Passepied
- Rigaudon
- Sarabande
- Tambourin

The French style was also danced in England where they introduced their own dance type:

- Hornpipe

=== Dance during the English Regency ===
An era of uncertainty in England, with the Napoleonic Wars, periodic riots, and the French Revolution across the Channel. Clothing tended to be light and unrestrictive, encouraging dances with lots of skipping and jumping, such as the English Country Dance, Polonaise, Quadrille, and Scotch Reel.

=== Dance in the mid-19th century ===
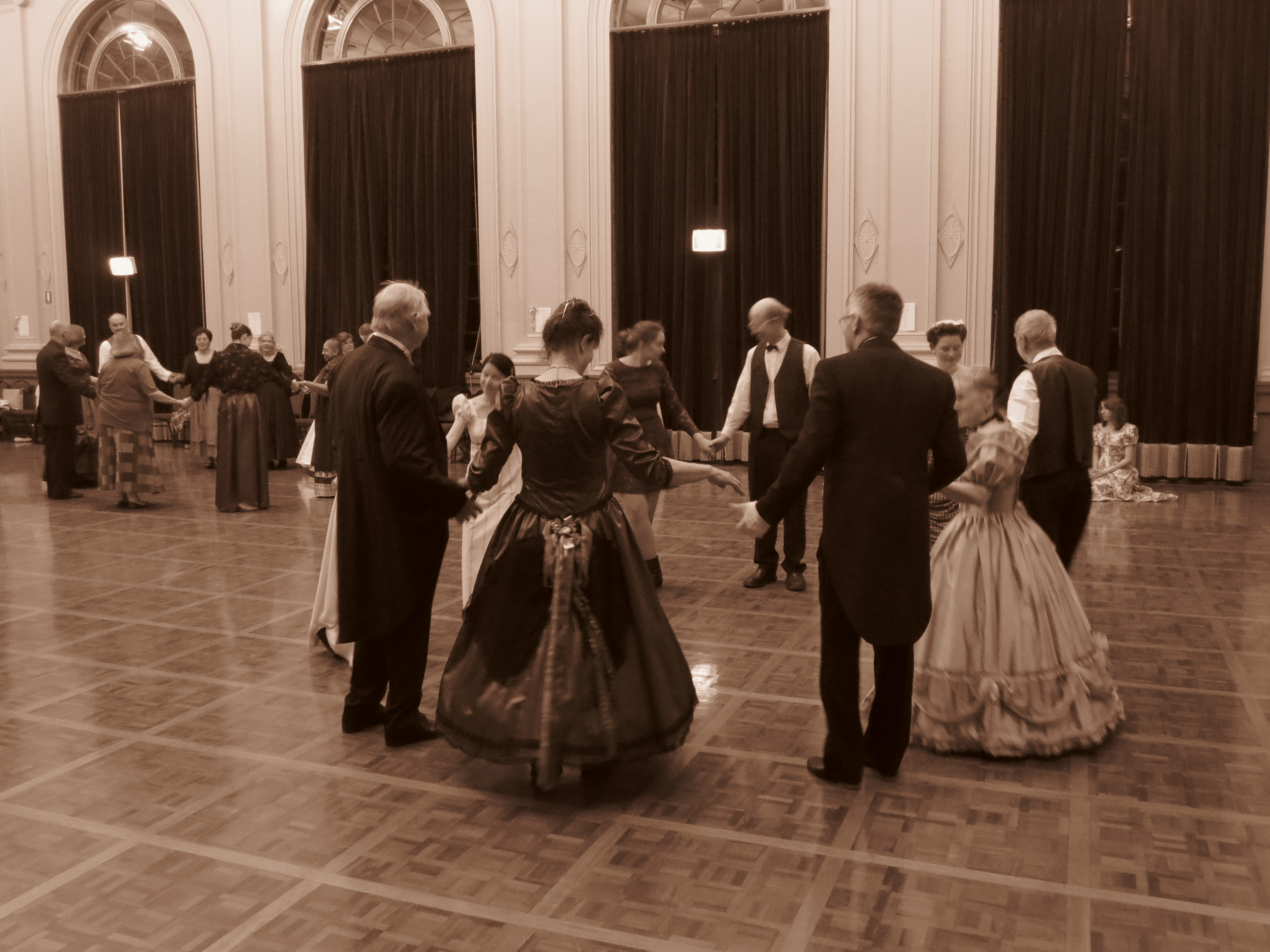
A Historical Colonial Ball in the Albert Hall Canberra (circa 2016) (sepia)

Starting with the great international polka craze of 1844 anyone who was anyone was dancing. Women were in hoop skirts, and turning dances helped to keep them out of the way. Dances popular during this period included the polka, schottische, two-step, and the waltz.

=== Dance in the late 19th century to about 1910 ===
The dances popular in mid-century were still being done at the end of the century, but by fewer people. Dance masters, in vain attempts to maintain their place in society and in the economy, invented dances of greater and greater complexity that people followed with less and less enthusiasm. During this period, the bustle replaced the hoop, which necessitated a few changes in dancing. At the same time, ragtime music began to gain mainstream respectability. Some examples of dances popular during this period include the cakewalk, Krakowiak, mazurka, racket, redowa, and the waltz.

=== Dance in the Ragtime era ===
Vernon and Irene Castle brought an air of respectability to couples dancing, and sparked what was arguably the largest U.S. dance craze ever. But by the end of World War I, these were considered old fashioned, and included the foxtrot, maxixe, one-step, tango, and waltz.

=== Dance in the 1920s ===
During the roaring twenties, for the first time, there was a class of children who did not have to work to help support the family. This was an era of highly energetic dances done by the younger generation, represented by the Black Bottom, Charleston, foxtrot, shag, and waltz.

=== Dance in the 1930s and 1940s ===
In the peak of the Swing era, more exotic dance styles became ever more popular among younger generations in America. Dances popular during this period were the Big Apple (dance), foxtrot, swing, waltz, tap, and the jitterbug.

== See also ==
- History of dance
- Ballet
- Masque
- List of dances
- An American Ballroom Companion
