= List of Ace titles in N series =

Ace Books published its N series from 1965 to 1968, priced at 95 cents.

- N-1 NA UPI editors Retrospect 1964: Summaries and Captions From Special U.P.I Dispatches (1965)
- N-2 NA UPI editors Retrospect 1965: U.P.I. Pictorial History of 1964 (1966)
- N-3 SF Frank Herbert Dune (1965)
- N-4 NA Isaac Asimov Is Anyone There? (1966)
- N-6 NA Richard A. Lupoff Edgar Rice Burroughs: Master Of Adventure (1968)
