= Valse à deux temps =

Valse à deux temps, waltz à deux temps ("waltz in two beats"), also Valse à deux pas ("waltz of two steps") or Valse Russe ("Russian waltz") (Russian name: вальс в "два па") was a waltz of Russian origin introduced in France in the mid-19th century.

A French dance manual of the beginning of the 20th century (a copy is digitized by the American Ballroom Companion of the United States Library of Congress) contains the following description by a contemporary witness:

I know exactly what I am talking about when I speak of the Russian origin of the Two-step waltz, as my father was the second person to dance it in Paris in 1839-- I say "the second person" intentionally, for the first was one of his students. I can still remember the following curious and little known anecdote about the introduction of the Russian Waltz to France, for the Two-Step Waltz is not only Russian, but it is even their National Waltz. Let me add, in passing, that their ladies and gentlemen excel in dancing; their energy, their brio, often surpass ours.

In January 1839, the Baron de Nieuken, attaché with the Russian delegation, took dancing lessons with my father, and took them as they were given at the time-- composed of all the fundamental exercises of dance: pliés, battements, etc. Our baron had to go one evening to a great ball given by the Count Mole, then Minister of Foreign Affairs, and would have to dance the waltz with some charming Moscow ladies. He therefore asked his professor to rehearse it with him. My father was upset by the words "Two-step Waltz," which seemed in manifest contradiction with three-beat waltz time; but everything was promptly arranged when he saw our baron dancing the waltz with his first step on the first two beats of the measure, and the second step on the third beat. Right away my father understood that in dance, as in music, two notes can make up a three-beat measure, taking the notes here as movements.

Pupil and teacher waltzed together, and the pupil that evening attracted the admiration of all the ladies for his two-step waltz. From that moment onward, the old three-beat waltz was but little honored in the salons; only the public balls kept it on; but, to follow the example above, the habitués of La Chaumière created a second, simplified kind of two-step waltz, contenting themselves with jumping sometimes on one foot, sometimes on the other, without paying much attention to the music.

The prince of Galitzine, the baron and the count of Damas, and the marquis de La Baume were the first two-beat waltzers in Paris. The day after the ball at the Ministry of Foreign Affairs, they danced it at the home of Count Tanneguy Duchattel, Minister of the Interior.

Theory of the Two-Step Waltz:

The step is taken in a three-beat measure, and with a sudden movement. First beat: Slide the left foot to the left, and stop, bending the knees slightly for the second beat; on the third beat, bring the right foot quickly behind the left one, sidestepping it before one towards the left. This step can also be done behind, sidestepping the foot behind oneself instead of in front. The steps are the same for the lady.
Usage for waltzing:

The gentleman begins with his left foot and the lady with her right, and together they take one step forward and then one step back. This direction forwards and backwards should be taken while moving slightly on the diagonal to the right and then to the left. The dancers make rather primitive, large movements at the beginning, and gradually make them smaller, as their limbs become used to the step.
