= The Black Tower (Lupoff novel) =

1988 novel by Richard A. Lupoff

- Author: Richard A. Lupoff
- Language: English
- Genre: Mystery
- Publisher: Bantam Books
- Publication date: 1988
- Publication place: United States

The Black Tower is a novel by Richard A. Lupoff published by Bantam Books in 1988.

== Plot summary ==
The Black Tower is the first book in Philip José Farmer's Dungeon series, taking place in a mysterious prison the size of a world, which holds creatures found across both time and space.

== Reception ==
J. Michael Caparula reviewed The Black Tower in Space Gamer/Fantasy Gamer No. 85. Caparula commented: "The book is fast and at times fun, but be warned that it is far from a complete work. It seems to me that even novels that are part of a series should be able to stand on their own."

== Reviews ==
- Review by John Gilbert (1990) in Fear, February 1990
- Review [German] by Franz Schröpf? (1991) in Fantasia 59/60
