= Gaskell Ball =

Victorian-styled ball held in Oakland, California, U.S.

== The Ball ==
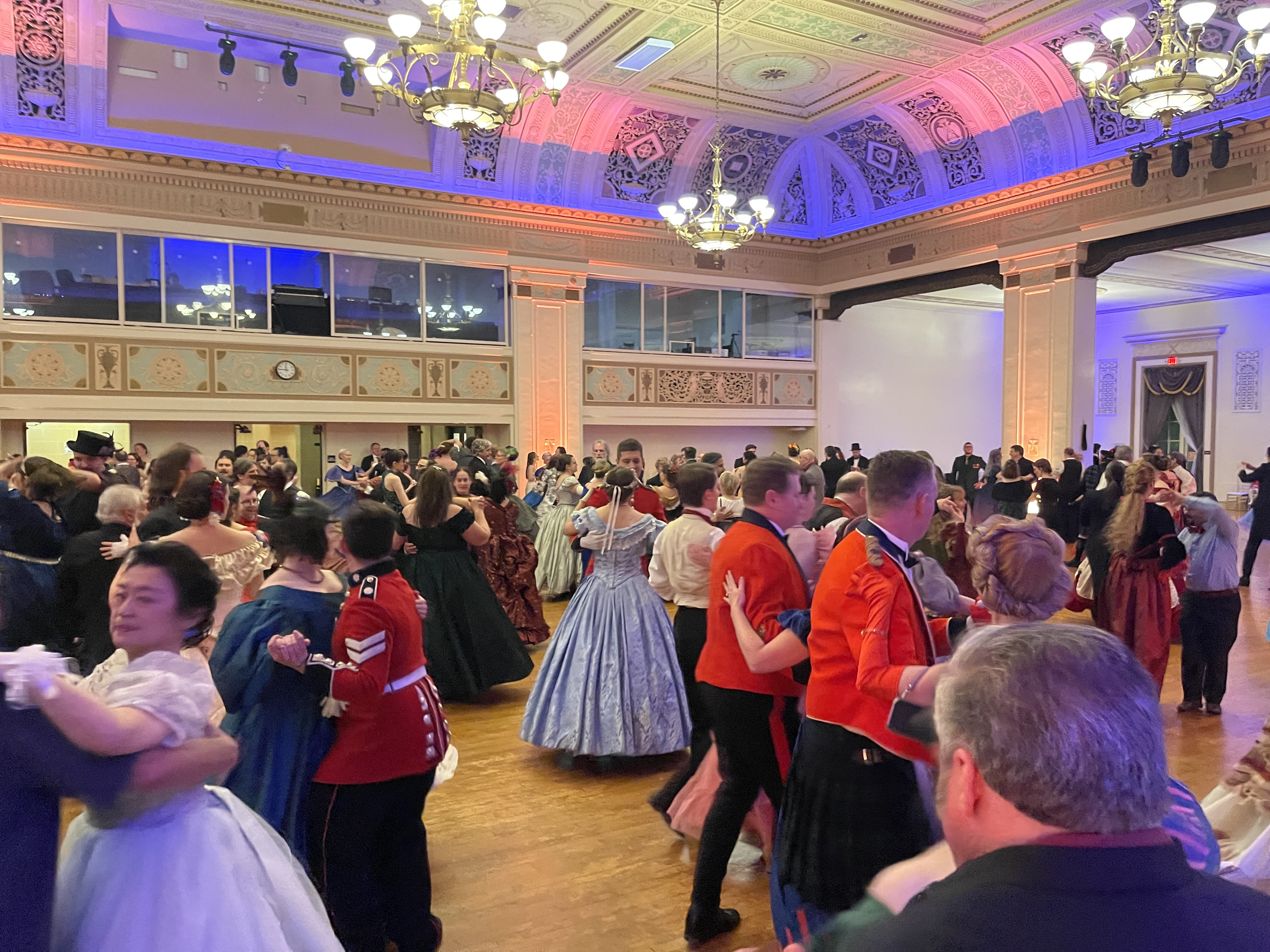
Dancers at the 2024 Gaskell Ball

The Gaskell Ball is a Victorian-styled ball held annually in Oakland, California at the Oakland Scottish Rite Center, and is popular among historical re-creationists and vintage dance enthusiasts.

=== Music ===
Music for the event is provided by The Brassworks Band, a popular local band.

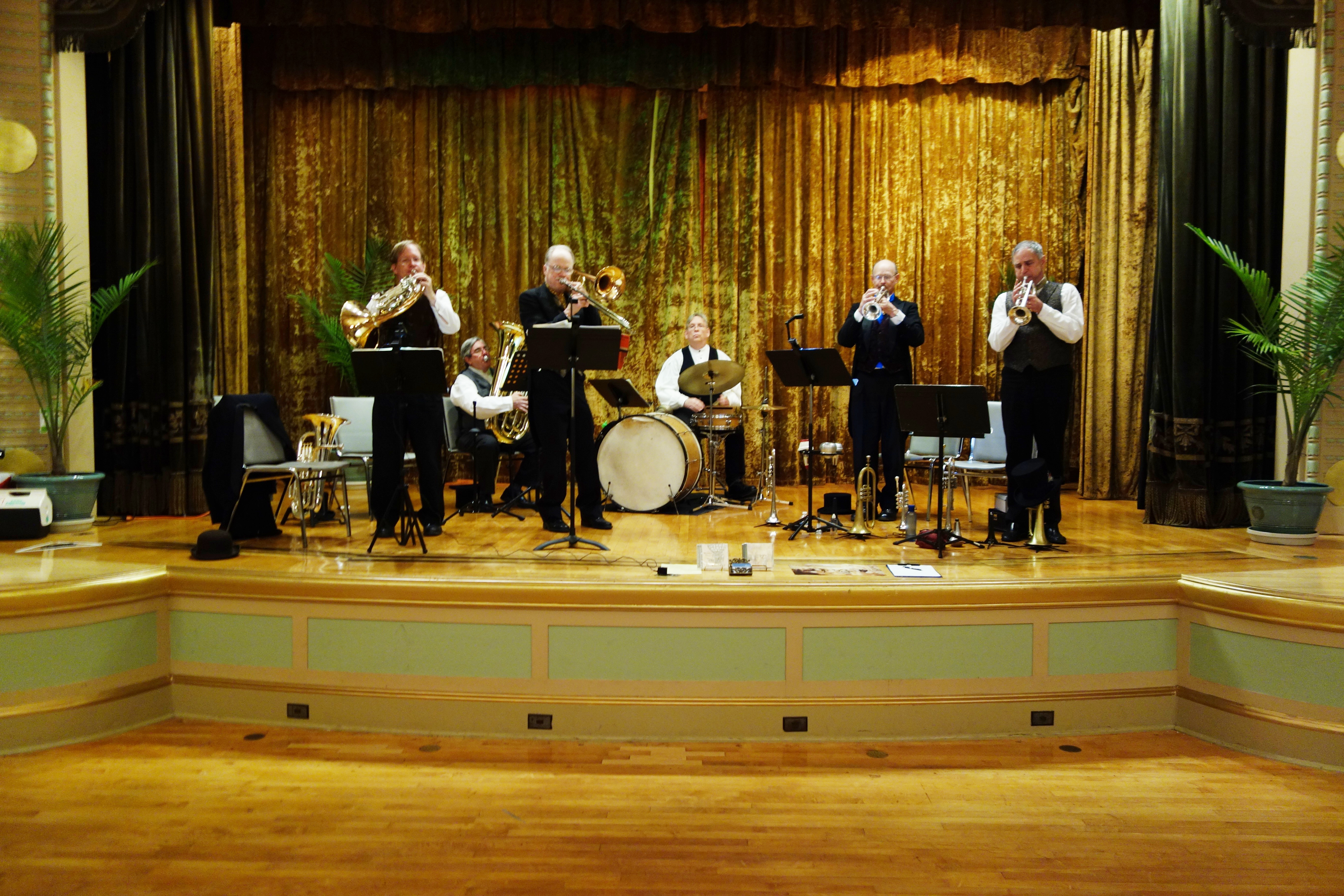
The Brassworks Band at the 2014 Gaskell Ball

=== Dances ===
The dances at the ball include both couples dances, like waltz, and set dances, like Sir Roger de Coverley. The ball also includes modern reconstructions of vintage-styled choreographies, such as John Hertz's Congress of Vienna Waltz and Richard Powers' Bohemian National Polka choreographies.

=== Format ===
The doors open at 6:30, with a basic vintage waltz lesson for early attendees at 6:45, and then dancing begins at 7:30 with four sets of songs, with breaks between sets, ending at 11pm.

The dance commonly opens with a Grand March, and the last dance is usually Sir Roger de Coverley. The Hallelujah Chorus is frequently as a sing-along at December balls.

Small refreshment and water & punch are served.

=== Classes ===
Couples dances are taught in an afternoon class before the ball begins, and include vintage waltz, schottische, polka, mazurka.

Many of the group dances are taught at the ball, right before they are danced.

=== The Attire ===
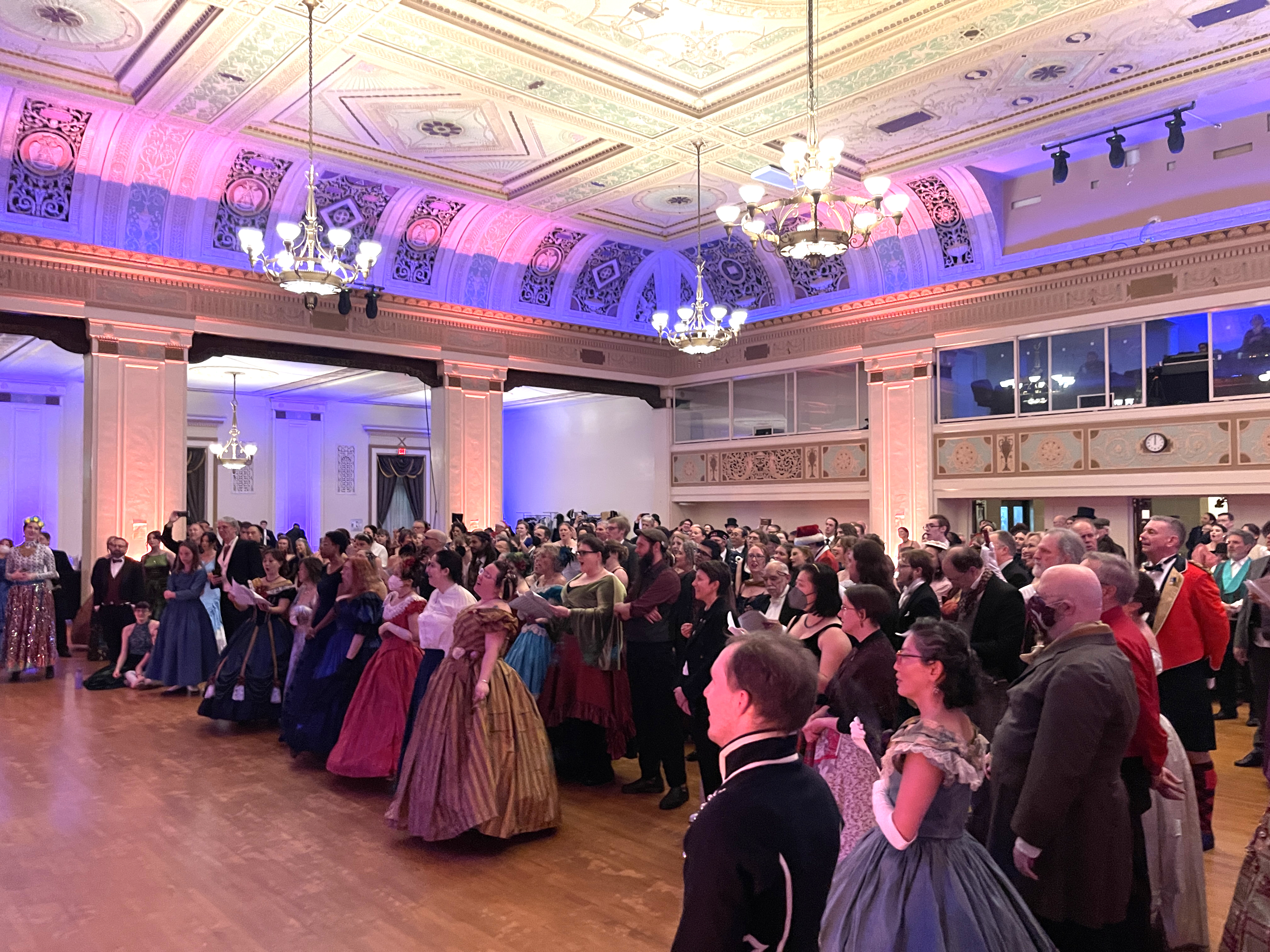
Dancers at the end of the 2024 Gaskell Ball

The ball's Attire Web Page says Victorian or more recent formal wear is required. This is a change with the 2024 ball, formal wear had previously only been requested. Close reading suggests that the ball is requiring a minimum of something closer to semi-formal. Precise details are on the ball website.

=== Performances ===
There are occasional performances by local dance groups, during the breaks, such as Danse Libre; however there is no official dance group affiliated with the ball.

The Gaskell Ball is a favorite among dancers from the Stanford, UC Berkeley and UC Santa Cruz social dance circles.

=== History ===
==== Recent History ====
The most recent ball was held on Saturday, December 28, 2024. It was a great success. The ball sold out, with over 600 people attending.

No ball has yet been announced for 2025.

==== Origins ====
The Gaskell Ball is named for the British writer Elizabeth Gaskell. The Gaskell Ball originated in 1979, when the troupe playing the Gaskell family at The Great Dickens Christmas Fair decided to hold a ball in her honor. The first official ball was held at Mills College, a women's college in Oakland.

Unofficially, it germinated from a 19th century dance party held in 1976 at Mills College because the Dickens Fair didn't happen that year. A Mills College student who had danced at Fezziwig's at the Dickens Fair's Army Street location in 1974 and 1975, hosted the event because with no month-long Fair, she and her friends were "going into dance withdrawal." These students and others would go on to continue working at the Dickens Fair where Carol Teten (Teton) was engaged to teach for the 1977, 1978 and 1979 seasons.

Following Mills College, Gaskell Ball moved to the Veterans' Auditorium on Lake Merritt in Oakland. In 1990 the Ball outgrew the hall and was moved to accommodate the increased attendance at the Scottish Rite Center on the other side of Lake Merritt.

The ball continued until 2015, then took a hiatus, returning in 2024.
