= Xero (fanzine) =

American fanzine

Xero 9 cover illustration by Bhob Stewart, originally printed on DayGlo red paper. To see this image at full resolution, go to Potrzebie.

Xero was a fanzine edited and published by Dick Lupoff, Pat Lupoff and Bhob Stewart from 1960 to 1963, winning a Hugo Award in the latter year. With science fiction and comic books as the core subjects, Xero also featured essays, satire, articles, poetry, artwork and cartoons on a wide range of other topics, material later collected into two hardcover books.

== History ==
The first issue was distributed September 3–5, 1960, at Pittcon (the 18th World Science Fiction Convention in Pittsburgh). That issue featured an article about Captain Marvel and Fawcett Comics, the first "All in Color for a Dime" installment. In 1961, Lupoff wrote an article for Comic Art about the launch of Xero and his focus on comics:

The night of the costume ball, Pat and I showed up in our costumes: hastily devised Captain Marvel and Mary Marvel outfits. Mine was made from a set of long underwear, and hers was nothing but a man’s red T-shirt emblazoned with felt lightning, plus a yellow sash. They were extremely popular costumes. Everyone from Doc Smith on down wanted to take our pictures. Why?… The only conclusion that can be drawn is that it was not us, nor our costumes themselves, that were popular. It was Captain Marvel and Mary Marvel, momentarily embodied in us, that drew the admiration and applause... Further, "All in Color" has been the most letter-provoking feature of Xero, numerous people have requested copies, specifying that their motive is to obtain the comics articles, and if all the authors currently committed to write for the series come through with articles, the series will run well into 1962 before material runs out.

In subsequent issues, the articles and letter columns often featured well-known contributors: Dan Adkins, Otto Binder, James Blish, Anthony Boucher, Algis Budrys, Lin Carter, Avram Davidson, L. Sprague de Camp, Roger Ebert, Harlan Ellison, Ed Gorman, Ron Haydock, Roy Krenkel, Frederik Pohl, Larry Shaw, Robert Shea, Steve Stiles, Bob Tucker, Donald E. Westlake, Ted White, Paul Williams and Walt Willis.

== Books ==
The format of Xero imitated Ace Books' Ace Doubles (two novels bound together with cover illustrations on front and back). When Xero was flipped over, it revealed a second cover leading into an article on comic books. These articles were mostly about 1940s superheroes: "The Spawn of M.C. Gaines" by Ted White; "Me To Your Leader Take" by Richard Ellington; "The Big Red Cheese" by Dick Lupoff; "The First (arf, arf) Superhero of Them All (Popeye)" by Bill Blackbeard; "OK, Axis, Here We Come!" by Don Thompson; "One on All and All on One" by Tom Fagan; "A Swell Bunch of Guys" by Jim Harmon; "The Four-Panelled, Sock-Bang-Powie Saturday Afternoon Screen" by Chris Steinbrunner; "Captain Billy's Whiz Gang!" by Roy Thomas; "The Second Banana Superheroes" by Ron Goulart; and "Comic of the Absurd" by Harlan Ellison. These articles were later collected in the hardcover book All in Color for a Dime (Arlington House, 1970), reprinted in paperback by Ace Books in 1971 and Krause Publications in 1997.

Other articles and art from Xero were reprinted in The Best of Xero, published by San Francisco's Tachyon Publications in 2004. John Hertz reviewed The Best of Xero in Emerald City:

Davidson, Carter, and Stiles all contributed to Xero; Stiles, who in 2004 was on the Best Fanartist ballot, then drew with a stylus on mimeograph stencils, the technology of the day. Pat & Dick Lupoff typed stencils in their Manhattan apartment, printed them on a machine in Noreen & Larry Shaw’s basement, collated by hand, and lugged the results to SF cons or stuffed them in mailboxes. The machine had not been given by Damon Knight, A. J. Budrys explained in a letter after a while, but lent. Eventually drawings could be scanned by electro-stencil, a higher tech. Colored ink joined colored paper, sometimes wildly colored. Xero could be spectacular. Knight later founded the Science Fiction Writers of America; he and Budrys were each later Writer Guest of Honor at a Worldcon. James Blish won two Retrospective Hugos in 2004; in Xero he reviewed Budrys’ Rogue Moon (not reprinted by Tachyon), and Kingsley Amis’ New Maps of Hell. You’ll also see Anthony Boucher, Harlan Ellison, Ethel Lindsay, Fred Pohl, Rick Sneary, Bob Tucker as "Hoy Ping Pong", Harry Warner—fans and pros mixing it up. Roger Ebert, later a movie critic, contributed poetry, often free-style, or formal and funny in his fanziner’s version of Browning’s "Last Duchess":

This crud
I print for you disgusts me; the thud
Is of your fanzine dully falling.

== Awards ==
Xero won the Hugo Award for Best Fanzine in 1963.
