= Jeff Berkwits =

American science fiction editor (born 1969)

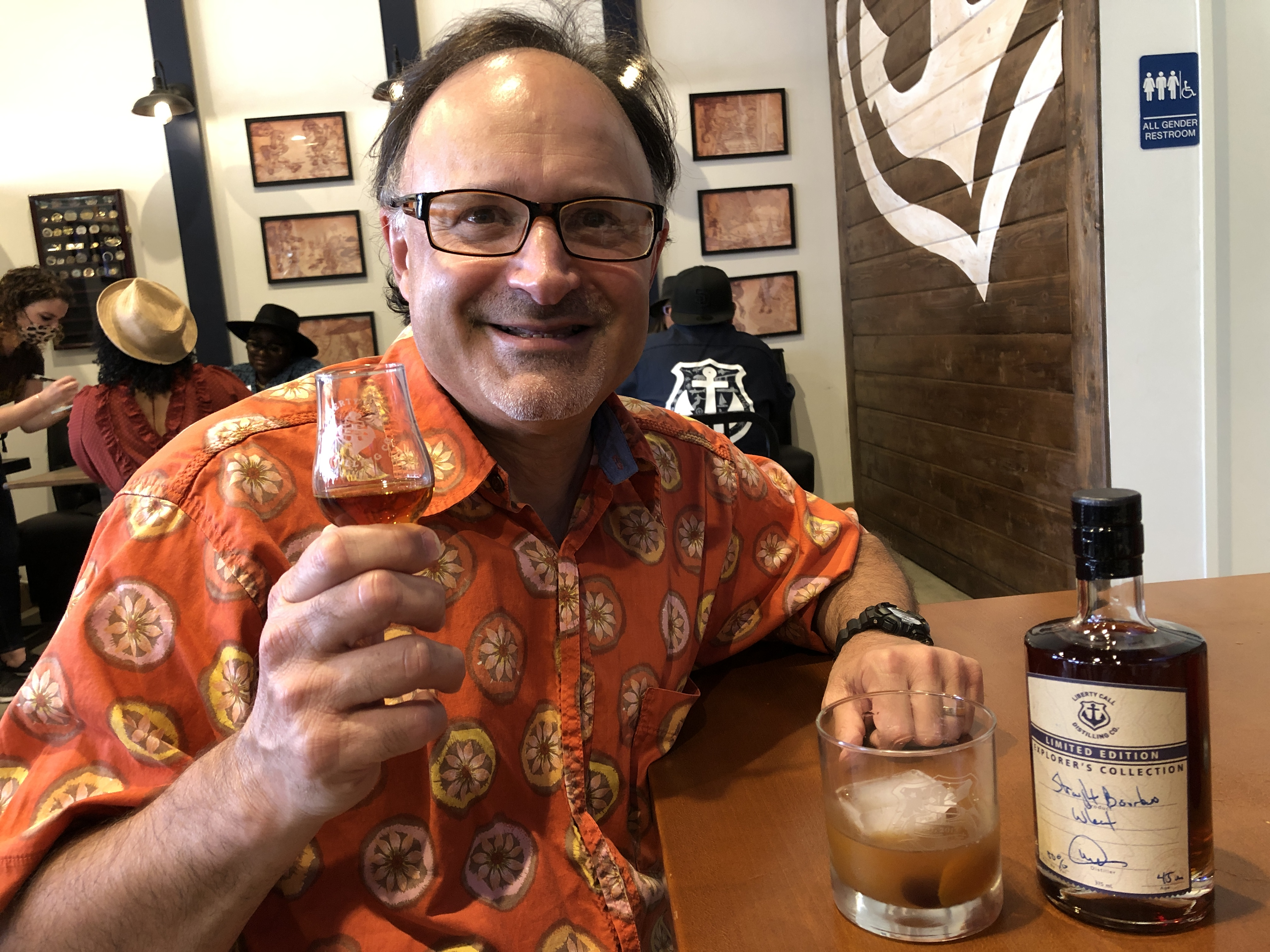
- Born: 1969 (age 55–56)
- Occupation: Editor
- Genre: Science fiction
- Notable works: Asterism: The Journal of Science Fiction, Fantasy and Space Music

Jeff Berkwits is an American science fiction editor.

== Work ==
Berkwits was appointed editor of Amazing Stories by Paizo Publishing in 2004. Berkwits remained in that position until Amazing went on hiatus in 2005, only three issues into his editorship.

In addition to editing the final three issues of Amazing, Berkwits published Asterism: The Journal of Science Fiction, Fantasy and Space Music in the 1990s. Asterism focused its attention on science fictional music (although not particularly filk). In 2000 and 2001, he served as the entertainment editor for Galaxy OnLine.

Berkwits received two nominations, in 2002 and 2004 for the Hugo Award for Best Fan Writer.

As a freelance writer, Berkwits' articles have appeared in a variety of magazines, including Locus, Cinescape, SCI FI, The X-Files Official Magazine, and Science Fiction Weekly.

Berkwits published two short stories, "First Contact" and "Dirty Laundry," in Keen Science Fiction in 1996.
