= Hugo Award for Best Fan Writer =

Annual award for science fiction or fantasy

- Awarded for: The best fan writer of works devoted primarily to science fiction or fantasy
- Presented by: World Science Fiction Society
- First award: 1967
- Most recent winner: Jason Sanford
- Website: thehugoawards.org

The Hugo Award for Best Fan Writer is the Hugo Award given each year for writers of works related to science fiction or fantasy which appeared in low- or non-paying publications such as semiprozines or fanzines or in generally available electronic media during the previous calendar year. There is no restriction that the writer is not also a professional author, and several such authors have won the award for their non-paying works. The award was first presented in 1967 and has been awarded annually.

During the 68 regular and retro nomination years, 115 writers have been finalists; 28 of these have won, including ties. David Langford has received the largest number of awards, with 21 wins out of 31 final ballot nominations. He was nominated every year from 1979 through 2009, and won 19 times in a row from 1989 through 2007. The other writers to win more than once are Richard E. Geis, with seven wins out of sixteen nominations; Mike Glyer, with four wins out of twenty-five nominations; Susan Wood Glicksohn, with three of eight; Harry Warner, Jr., with two out of nine; Wilson Tucker, with two out of nine; Bob Shaw, who won both times he was nominated; Forrest J Ackerman, with three out of five Retro Hugos; and Ray Bradbury, who won both Retro Hugos he was nominated for. The writers with the most nominations without winning are Evelyn C. Leeper, who was nominated twelve times in a row from 1990 through 2001, and Steven H Silver, whose twelve nominations span 2000–2013.

== History ==
The Hugo Awards are presented every year by the World Science Fiction Society for the best science fiction or fantasy works and achievements of the previous year. The award is named after Hugo Gernsback, the founder of the pioneering science fiction magazine Amazing Stories, and was once officially known as the Science Fiction Achievement Award. The award has been described as "a fine showcase for speculative fiction" and "the best known literary award for science fiction writing". In addition to the regular Hugo awards, between 1996 and 2025, Retrospective Hugo Awards or "Retro-Hugos" were available for works published 50, 75, or 100 years prior. Retro-Hugos could only be awarded for years after 1939 in which no awards were originally given. Retro-Hugo awards were awarded for 1939, 1941, 1943–1946, 1951, and 1954, and the fan writer award was given each time.

Fan writing is a peculiar entity, generally having little in common with professional fiction writing. Fan writing can be somber or witty (and even humorous, though that is rarer), expository or abstruse; it can make the momentous commonplace and the trivial momentous, according to the desire of the writer. Commonly, fan writing is a reflection of being a fan (as opposed to the many people who simply read science fiction) in a world mostly populated with people who aren't.

— Hitchcock, Chip, Introduction, In and Out of Quandry, 1982

Hugo Award nominees and winners are chosen by supporting or attending members of the annual World Science Fiction Convention, or Worldcon, and the presentation evening constitutes its central event. The selection process is defined in the World Science Fiction Society Constitution as instant-runoff voting with six finalists, except in the case of a tie. The works on the ballot are the six most-nominated by members that year, with no limit on the number of works that can be nominated. Initial nominations are made by members in January through March, while voting on the ballot of six finalists is performed roughly in April through July, subject to change depending on when that year's Worldcon is held. Prior to 2017, the final ballot was five works; it was changed that year to six, with each initial nominator limited to five nominations. Worldcons are generally held near Labor Day, and in a different city around the world each year.

== Winners and finalists ==
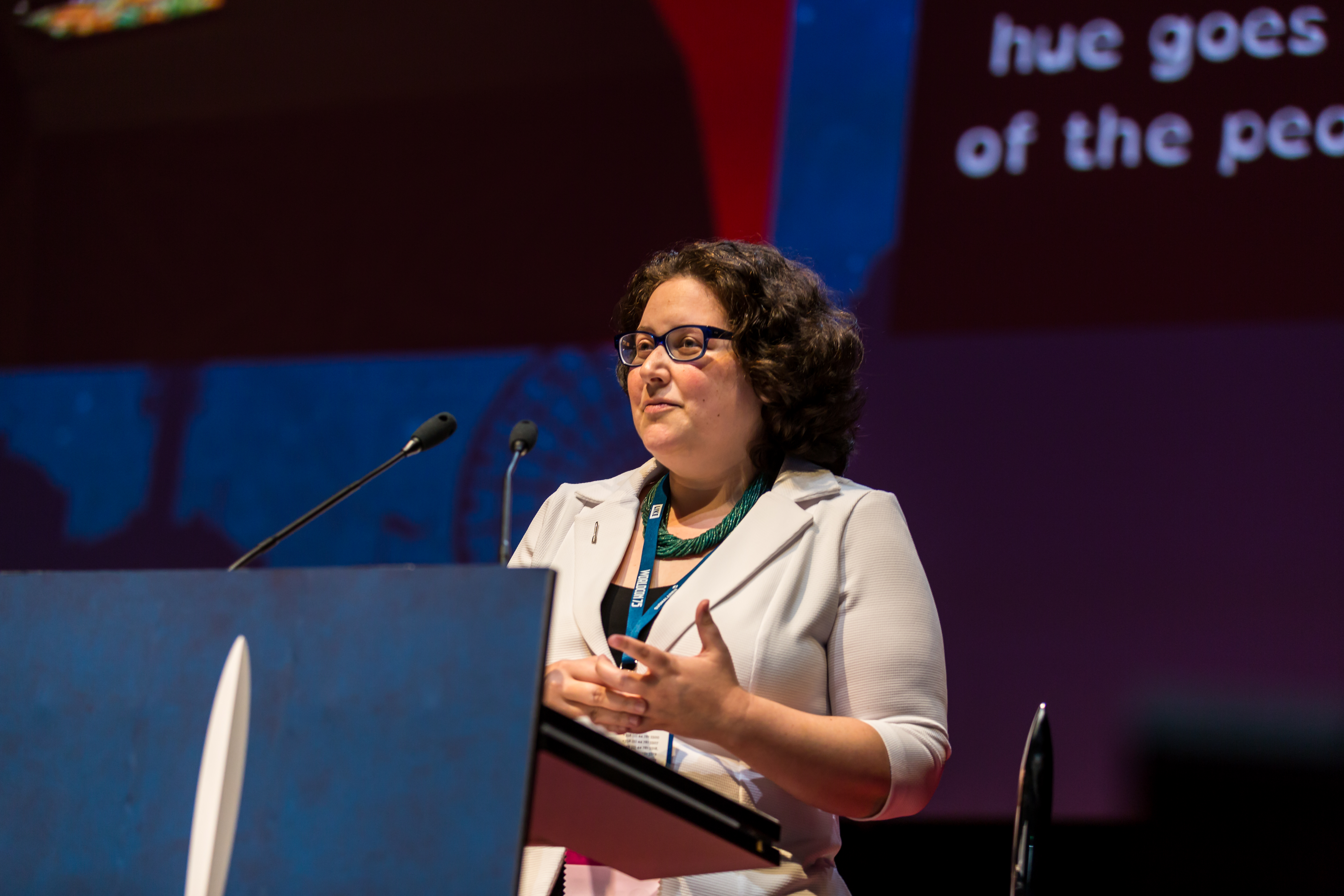
Abigail Nussbaum accepting the award in 2017.

In the following tables, the years correspond to the date of the ceremony. Writers are eligible based on their work of the previous calendar year. Entries with a yellow background and an asterisk (*) next to the writer's name have won the award; those with a gray background are the finalists on the short-list. In some years writers who received sufficient nominations to be listed on the ballot declined; these are marked as withdrawn in the entry and are not listed on the main Hugo Award site.

* Winners and joint winners

Winners and finalists
Year	Writer(s)	Ref(s)
1967	Alexei Panshin*	
1967	Norm Clarke	
1967	Bill Donaho	
1967	Harry Warner, Jr.	
1967	Paul J. Willis	
1968	Ted White*	
1968	Ruth Berman	
1968	Harry Warner, Jr.	
1968	Harlan Ellison (withdrawn)	
1968	Alexei Panshin (withdrawn)	
1969	Harry Warner, Jr.*	
1969	Richard Delap	
1969	Banks Mebane	
1969	Walt Willis	
1969	Ted White (withdrawn)	
1970	Wilson Tucker*	
1970	Piers Anthony	
1970	Charles N. Brown	
1970	Richard Delap	
1970	Richard E. Geis	
1971	Richard E. Geis*	
1971	Terry Carr	
1971	Tom Digby	
1971	Elizabeth Fishman	
1971	Ted Pauls	
1972	Harry Warner, Jr.*	
1972	Terry Carr	
1972	Tom Digby	
1972	Rosemary Ullyot	
1972	Bob Vardeman	
1972	Susan Wood Glicksohn	
1973	Terry Carr*	
1973	Charles N. Brown	
1973	Richard E. Geis	
1973	Sandra Miesel	
1973	Rosemary Ullyot	
1973	Susan Wood Glicksohn	
1974	Susan Wood Glicksohn*	
1974	Laura Basta	
1974	Richard E. Geis	
1974	Jacqueline Lichtenberg	
1974	Sandra Miesel	
1975	Richard E. Geis*	
1975	John Bangsund	
1975	Sandra Miesel	
1975	Don C. Thompson	
1975	Susan Wood Glicksohn	
1976	Richard E. Geis*	
1976	Charles N. Brown	
1976	Don D'Ammassa	
1976	Don C. Thompson	
1976	Susan Wood Glicksohn	
1977	Richard E. Geis*	
1977	Susan Wood Glicksohn*	
1977	Don D'Ammassa	
1977	Michael Glicksohn	
1977	Don C. Thompson	
1978	Richard E. Geis*	
1978	Charles N. Brown	
1978	Don D'Ammassa	
1978	Don C. Thompson	
1978	Susan Wood Glicksohn	
1979	Bob Shaw*	
1979	Richard E. Geis	
1979	David Langford	
1979	Roy Kettle	
1979	D. West	
1980	Bob Shaw*	
1980	Richard E. Geis	
1980	Mike Glyer	
1980	Arthur D. Hlavaty	
1980	David Langford	
1981	Susan Wood Glicksohn*	
1981	Richard E. Geis	
1981	Mike Glyer	
1981	Arthur D. Hlavaty	
1981	David Langford	
1982	Richard E. Geis*	
1982	Mike Glyer	
1982	Arthur D. Hlavaty	
1982	David Langford	
1983	Richard E. Geis*	
1983	Mike Glyer	
1983	Arthur D. Hlavaty	
1983	David Langford	
1984	Mike Glyer*	
1984	Richard E. Geis	
1984	Arthur D. Hlavaty	
1984	David Langford	
1984	Teresa Nielsen Hayden	
1985	David Langford*	
1985	Leigh Edmonds	
1985	Richard E. Geis	
1985	Mike Glyer	
1985	Arthur D. Hlavaty	
1986	Mike Glyer*	
1986	Don D'Ammassa	
1986	Richard E. Geis	
1986	Arthur D. Hlavaty	
1986	David Langford	
1986	Patrick Nielsen Hayden	
1987	David Langford*	
1987	Mike Glyer	
1987	Arthur D. Hlavaty	
1987	Patrick Nielsen Hayden	
1987	Simon Ounsley	
1987	D. West	
1987	Owen Whiteoak (withdrawn)	
1988	Mike Glyer*	
1988	Arthur D. Hlavaty	
1988	David Langford	
1988	Guy H. Lillian III	
1988	Leslie Turek	
1989	David Langford*	
1989	Avedon Carol	
1989	Mike Glyer	
1989	Arthur D. Hlavaty	
1989	Guy H. Lillian III	
1989	Chuq Von Rospach	
1990	David Langford*	
1990	Mike Glyer	
1990	Arthur D. Hlavaty	
1990	Evelyn C. Leeper	
1990	Leslie Turek	
1991	David Langford*	
1991	Avedon Carol	
1991	Mike Glyer	
1991	Arthur D. Hlavaty	
1991	Evelyn C. Leeper	
1991	Teresa Nielsen Hayden	
1992	David Langford*	
1992	Avedon Carol	
1992	Mike Glyer	
1992	Andrew Hooper	
1992	Evelyn C. Leeper	
1992	Harry Warner, Jr.	
1993	David Langford*	
1993	Mike Glyer	
1993	Andrew Hooper	
1993	Evelyn C. Leeper	
1993	Harry Warner, Jr.	
1994	David Langford*	
1994	Sharon N. Farber	
1994	Mike Glyer	
1994	Andrew Hooper	
1994	Evelyn C. Leeper	
1995	David Langford*	
1995	Sharon N. Farber	
1995	Mike Glyer	
1995	Andrew Hooper	
1995	Evelyn C. Leeper	
1996	David Langford*	
1996	Sharon N. Farber	
1996	Andrew Hooper	
1996	Evelyn C. Leeper	
1996	Joseph T. Major	
1997	David Langford*	
1997	Sharon N. Farber	
1997	Mike Glyer	
1997	Andrew Hooper	
1997	Evelyn C. Leeper	
1998	David Langford*	
1998	Bob Devney	
1998	Mike Glyer	
1998	Andrew Hooper	
1998	Evelyn C. Leeper	
1998	Joseph T. Major	
1999	David Langford*	
1999	Bob Devney	
1999	Mike Glyer	
1999	Evelyn C. Leeper	
1999	Maureen Kincaid Speller	
2000	David Langford*	
2000	Bob Devney	
2000	Mike Glyer	
2000	Evelyn C. Leeper	
2000	Steven H Silver	
2001	David Langford*	
2001	Bob Devney	
2001	Mike Glyer	
2001	Evelyn C. Leeper	
2001	Steven H Silver	
2002	David Langford*	
2002	Jeff Berkwits	
2002	Bob Devney	
2002	John L. Flynn	
2002	Mike Glyer	
2002	Steven H Silver	
2003	David Langford*	
2003	Bob Devney	
2003	John L. Flynn	
2003	Mike Glyer	
2003	Steven H Silver	
2004	David Langford*	
2004	Jeff Berkwits	
2004	Bob Devney	
2004	John L. Flynn	
2004	Cheryl Morgan	
2005	David Langford*	
2005	Claire Brialey	
2005	Bob Devney	
2005	Cheryl Morgan	
2005	Steven H Silver	
2006	David Langford*	
2006	Claire Brialey	
2006	John Hertz	
2006	Cheryl Morgan	
2006	Steven H Silver	
2007	David Langford*	
2007	Christopher Garcia	
2007	John Hertz	
2007	John Scalzi	
2007	Steven H Silver	
2008	John Scalzi*	
2008	David Langford	
2008	Christopher Garcia	
2008	Cheryl Morgan	
2008	Steven H Silver	
2009	Cheryl Morgan*	
2009	Christopher Garcia	
2009	John Hertz	
2009	David Langford	
2009	Steven H Silver	
2010	Frederik Pohl*	
2010	Claire Brialey	
2010	Christopher Garcia	
2010	James Nicoll	
2010	Lloyd Penney	
2011	Claire Brialey*	
2011	James Bacon	
2011	Christopher Garcia	
2011	James Nicoll	
2011	Steven H Silver	
2012	Jim C. Hines*	
2012	James Bacon	
2012	Claire Brialey	
2012	Christopher Garcia	
2012	Steven H Silver	
2013	Tansy Rayner Roberts*	
2013	James Bacon	
2013	Christopher Garcia	
2013	Mark Oshiro	
2013	Steven H Silver	
2014	Kameron Hurley*	
2014	Liz Bourke	
2014	Foz Meadows	
2014	Abigail Nussbaum	
2014	Mark Oshiro	
2015	Laura J. Mixon*	
2015	Dave Freer	
2015	Amanda S. Green	
2015	Jeffro Johnson	
2015	Cedar Sanderson	
2016	Mike Glyer*	
2016	Douglas Ernst	
2016	Morgan Holmes	
2016	Jeffro Johnson	
2016	Shamus Young	
2017	Abigail Nussbaum*	
2017	Mike Glyer	
2017	Jeffro Johnson	
2017	Natalie Luhrs	
2017	Foz Meadows	
2017	Chuck Tingle	
2018	Sarah Gailey*	
2018	Camestros Felapton	
2018	Mike Glyer	
2018	Foz Meadows	
2018	Charles Payseur	
2018	Bogi Takács	
2019	Foz Meadows*	
2019	James Nicoll	
2019	Charles Payseur	
2019	Elsa Sjunneson	
2019	Alasdair Stuart	
2019	Bogi Takács	
2020	Bogi Takács*	
2020	Cora Buhlert	
2020	James Nicoll	
2020	Alasdair Stuart	
2020	Paul Weimer	
2020	Adam Whitehead	
2021	Elsa Sjunneson*	
2021	Cora Buhlert	
2021	Charles Payseur	
2021	Jason Sanford	
2021	Alasdair Stuart	
2021	Paul Weimer	
2022	Cora Buhlert*	
2022	Chris M. Barkley	
2022	Bitter Karella	
2022	Alex Brown	
2022	Jason Sanford	
2022	Paul Weimer	
2023	Chris M. Barkley*	
2023	Bitter Karella	
2023	Arthur Liu	
2023	RiverFlow	
2023	Jason Sanford	
2023	Örjan Westin	
2024	Paul Weimer*	
2024	Bitter Karella	
2024	James Nicoll	
2024	Jason Sanford	
2024	Alasdair Stuart	
2024	Örjan Westin	
2025	Abigail Nussbaum*	
2025	Camestros Felapton	
2025	Roseanna Pendlebury	
2025	Jason Sanford	
2025	Alasdair Stuart	
2025	Örjan Westin	
2026	Jason Sanford*	
2026	Jay Brantner	
2026	Alex Brown	
2026	James Davis Nicoll	
2026	Roseanna Pendlebury	
2026	Örjan Westin	

=== Retro Hugos ===
Between the 1996 Worldcon and 2025 Worldcon, the World Science Fiction Society had the concept of "Retro-Hugos", in which the Hugo award could be retroactively awarded for 50, 75, or 100 years prior. Retro-Hugos could only be awarded for years after 1939 (the year of the first Worldcon) in which no Hugos were originally awarded. Retro Hugos were awarded eight times, for 1939, 1941, 1943–1946, 1951, and 1954.

Retro Hugo winners and nominees
Year	Year awarded	Writer	Ref
1939	2014	Ray Bradbury*	
1939	2014	Forrest J Ackerman	
1939	2014	Wilson Tucker	
1939	2014	Harry Warner, Jr.	
1939	2014	Donald A. Wollheim	
1941	2016	Ray Bradbury*	
1941	2016	Forrest J Ackerman	
1941	2016	H. P. Lovecraft	
1941	2016	Wilson Tucker	
1941	2016	Harry Warner, Jr.	
1943	2018	Forrest J Ackerman*	
1943	2018	Jack Speer	
1943	2018	Wilson Tucker	
1943	2018	Harry Warner, Jr.	
1943	2018	Art Widner	
1943	2018	Donald A. Wollheim	
1944	2019	Forrest J Ackerman*	
1944	2019	Myrtle Douglas (as Morojo)	
1944	2019	Jack Speer	
1944	2019	Wilson Tucker	
1944	2019	Art Widner	
1944	2019	Donald A. Wollheim	
1945	2020	Fritz Leiber*	
1945	2020	Myrtle Douglas (as Morojo)	
1945	2020	J. Michael Rosenblum	
1945	2020	Jack Speer	
1945	2020	Wilson Tucker	
1945	2020	Harry Warner, Jr.	
1946	1996	Forrest J Ackerman*	
1946	1996	Charles E. Burbee	
1946	1996	Francis Towner Laney	
1946	1996	Wilson Tucker	
1946	1996	Art Widner	
1951	2001	Robert Silverberg*	
1951	2001	Lee Hoffman	
1951	2001	Wilson Tucker	
1951	2001	James White	
1951	2001	Walt Willis	
1954	2004	Wilson Tucker*	
1954	2004	Redd Boggs	
1954	2004	Lee Hoffman	
1954	2004	James White	
1954	2004	Walt Willis	
