= Circumpolar! =

1984 novel by Richard A. Lupoff

Circumpolar! is a novel by Richard A. Lupoff published in 1984.

== Plot summary ==
Circumpolar! is a novel in which an alternative history is depicted with vastly different geography: A highly flattened disklike "donut" topology. It describes a Great Air Race to circumnavigate the Earth by traveling through the "polar hole" (hence the title), around the "underside" of the Earth to its "rim", and back to its starting-point. The race features the von Richthofens competing against Charles Lindbergh and Howard Hughes.

== Reception ==
Dave Langford reviewed Circumpolar! for White Dwarf #70, and stated that "It goes on a bit long and it grossly libels the Red Baron, but it's amusing."

In his Science Fact and Science Fiction: An Encyclopedia, Brian M. Stableford cited the book as one of the relatively rare examples of science fiction dealing with the Flat Earth concept.

== Reviews ==
- Review by Faren Miller (1984) in Locus, #280 May 1984
- Review by Joe Sanders (1985) in Fantasy Review, July 1985
- Review by L. J. Hurst (1985) in Vector 128
- Review by David Pringle (1985) in Interzone, #14 Winter 1985/86
- Review by Tom Easton (1986) in Analog Science Fiction/Science Fact, March 1986
- Review by Don D'Ammassa (1986) in Science Fiction Chronicle, #80 May 1986
