= Sun's End =

Sun's End is a novel by Richard A. Lupoff published in 1984.

== Plot summary ==
Sun's End is a novel in which the main character awakes in 2089 rebuilt as a bionic superhuman with telepathic powers, and is now the wealthiest man in the entire solar system.

== Reception ==
Dave Langford reviewed Sun's End for White Dwarf #89, and stated that "Lupoff poses a problem: how to save 26 billion people from dying as the Sun overheats? He and his hero simply turn their backs on the question. Thumbs-down to both of them."

Wendy Graham reviewed Sun's End for Adventurer magazine and stated that "Cross The Six Million Dollar Man with Buck Rogers in the 25th. Century, and you have the hero Daniel Kitajama, who gets biffed by a crane in space in 2009, and is woken up 80 years later with only his brain (and half the Solar System's industry- thanks to his trustees) to call his own. I’m sure the end is very meaningful."

== Reviews ==
- Review by Michael R. Collings (1984) in Fantasy Review, December 1984
- Review by Tom Easton (1985) in Analog Science Fiction/Science Fact, May 1985
- Review by Robert Coulson (1985) in Amazing Stories, May 1985
