= La Guerre des mouches =

1937 French novel by Jacques Spitz

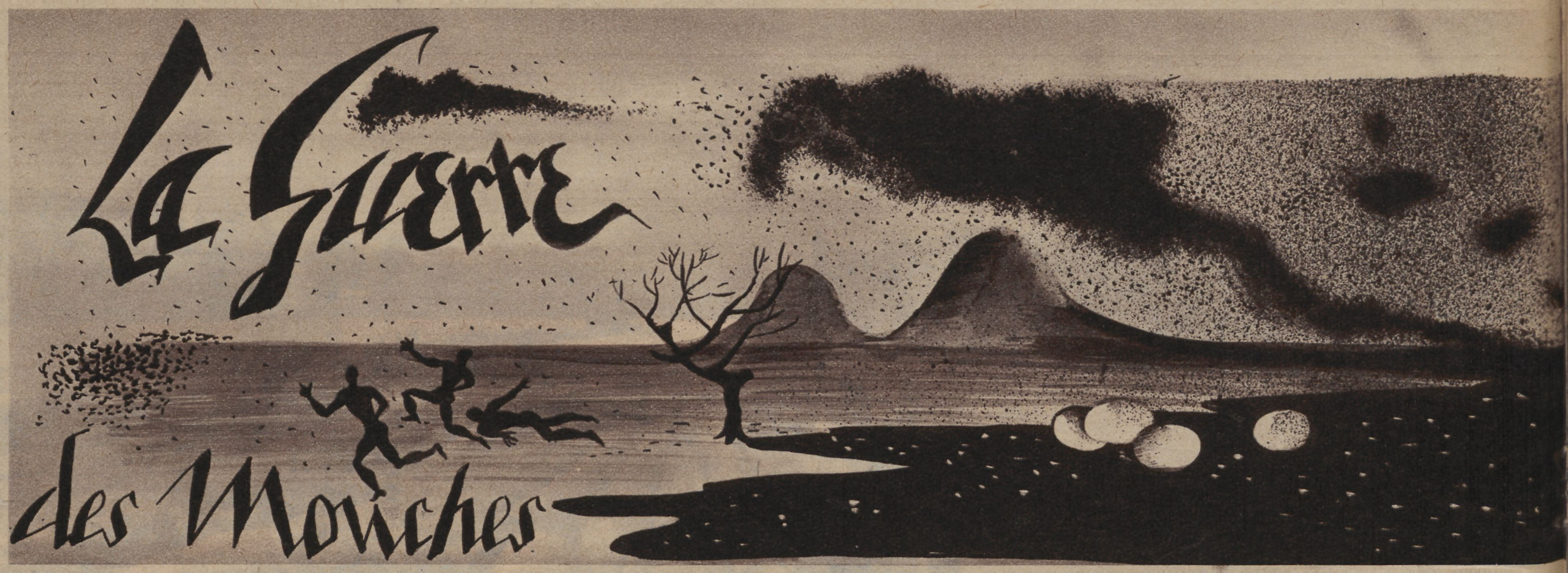
Illustration of Lalande for the novel of Jacques Spitz, La guerre des mouches, published in serial in the magazine Regards, 192, September 16, 1937.

La Guerre des mouches is a French novel by Jacques Spitz, affiliated with the literary genre scientific marvel, which was initially published in serial form in 1937 in the weekly magazine Regards. Published in hardback the following year by Gallimard in its collection "Les Romans fantastiques", the novel was reworked by Éditions Marabout to update it in 1970. It has since been republished in its original version.

The novel narrates, through the eyes of Juste-Évariste Magne, a young researcher in natural sciences, the appearance of a new species of flies in Indochina, in the late 1930s. Having acquired intelligence through a genetic mutation, these flies attack populations in large numbers and cause terrible devastation. Thanks to the carelessness and selfishness of nations, these insects managed to invade all of Asia and North Africa before finally making their way to Europe. The European countries, belatedly becoming aware of the peril that threatens them, then undertake the fight for the survival of humanity.

Written at the end of the 1930s, the novel deals with a classic science fiction theme, that of animals becoming intelligent and then fighting humanity for supremacy on the planet. Its treatment is nevertheless quite original for the time since it concludes on the annihilation of humanity. Because it is part of a satirical trend that has been running through the literature of scientific imagination since the beginning of the 20th century, this anticipation story is for Jacques Spitz a pretext for taking a critical look at his present. Indeed, the invasion of the flies is only an allegorical representation of the rise of Nazism, in front of which the European democracies kneaded in their nationalisms find themselves unable to organize.
