= Evelyn C. Leeper =

American writer, editor, and critic

Evelyn C. Leeper (a.k.a. Evelyn Chimelis; born 1950) is an American writer, critic, and active member of science fiction fandom.

She was a member and officer of the UMass Science Fiction Society from 1968 to 1972. In 1978, she and her husband Mark R. Leeper founded the Science Fiction Club at Bell Labs.

She and Mark have been Fan Guests of Honor at Novacon (1973, Michigan); Covert Contraption (1989, Michigan); and Windycon XXIX (2002, Chicago).

She and Mark have co-edited/co-published their weekly fanzine (the MT VOID) since 1978. As of October 15, 2021, it has had 2194 issues.

She was one of the judges of the Sidewise Award for Alternate History from 1995 to 2014 and a contributor to Uchronia: The Alternate History List. She was a finalist for the Hugo Award for Best Fan Writer twelve times (1990–2001), losing on each occasion to David Langford.
