= Foz Meadows =

Australian novelist, blogger and poet

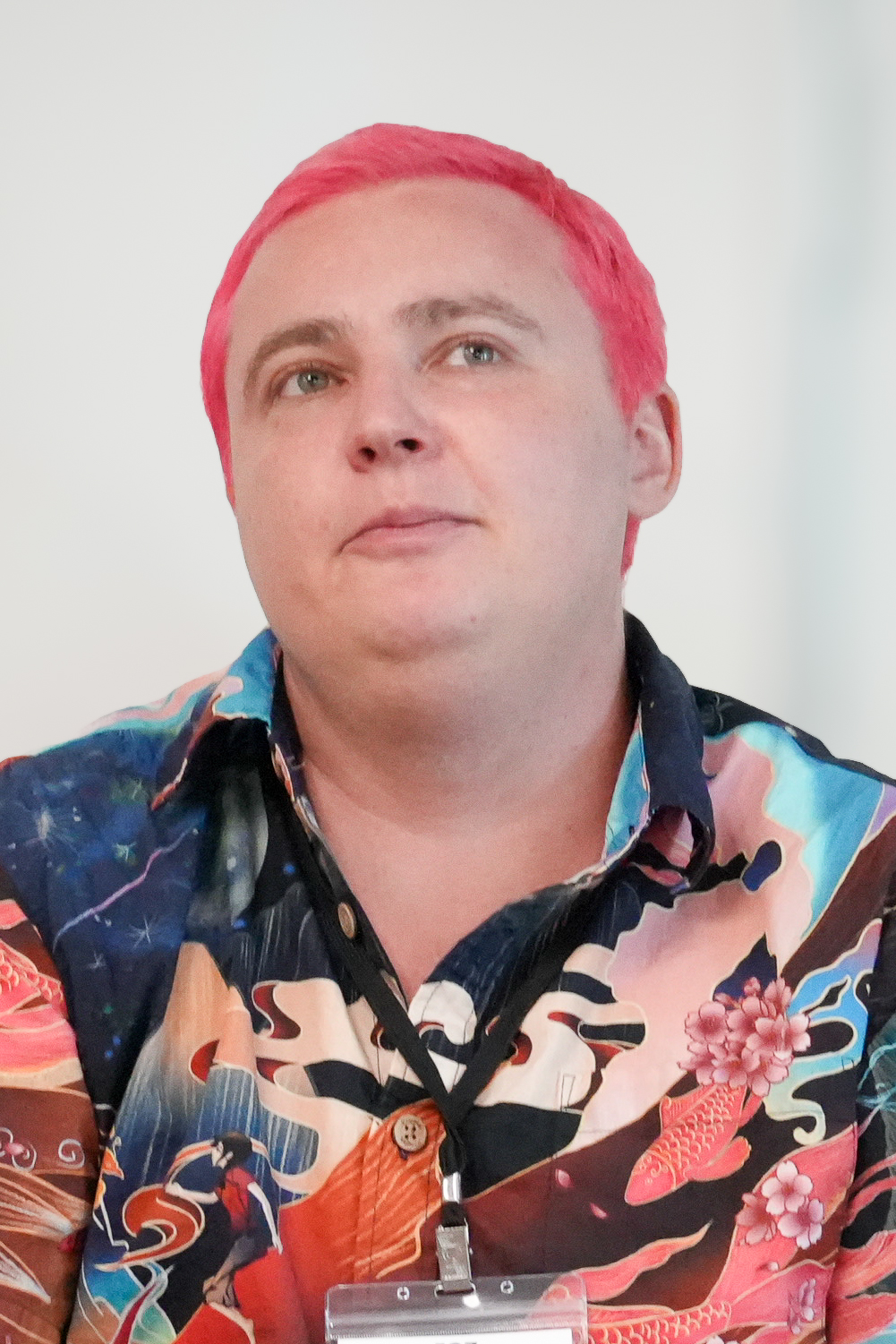
- Foz Meadows at the 2026 San Diego Writers Festival
- Born: Australia
- Occupation: Writer
- Writing career
- Pen name: Foz Meadows
- Genres: Urban fantasy, epic fantasy
- Website: fozmeadows.wordpress.com

Foz Meadows is an Australian fantasy novelist, blogger and poet.

== Work ==
An essayist, blogger and reviewer, Meadows has written for The Mary Sue, Apex Magazine, Black Gate, The Huffington Post, A Dribble of Ink, Strange Horizons and Tor.com. Meadows is a novelist working in science fiction and fantasy. Their novels, blog writing, and other essays have been nominated for significant genre awards such as the Hugo Award and the Ditmar Award.

== Personal life ==
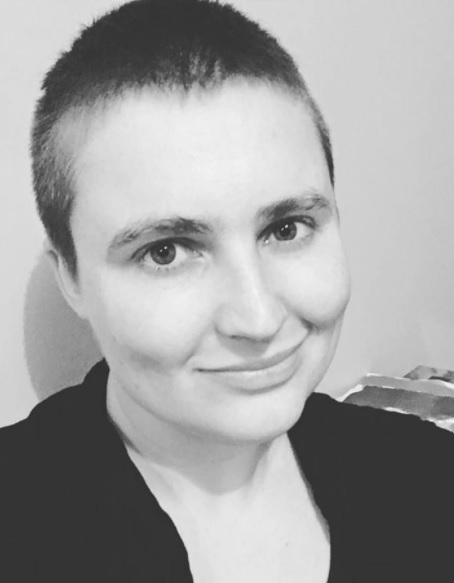
Meadows in 2017

Raised on the Central Coast of New South Wales, Meadows has lived across Australia, including Melbourne and Sydney, and the UK, including Bristol and Aberdeen. Meadows is married to philosophy lecturer Toby Meadows. They have one son, born while living in the UK, and they now live in Brisbane. Meadows is bisexual, and in 2015, they came out as genderqueer.

== Awards ==
- 2014, 2017 & 2018 Nomination for Hugo Award for Best Fan Writer
- 2014 & 2016 Nomination for Ditmar Award for Best Fan Writer
- 2017 Ditmar Award winner for Best Fan Writer
- 2017 Bisexual Book Awards Finalist for An Accident of Stars
- 2018 Norma K Hemming Award (Short Fiction) Winner for "Coral Bones"
- 2019 Hugo Award for Best Fan Writer

== Bibliography ==
=== Poetry ===
- Conversation – Cordite Poetry Review no. 27, March 2008
- Silence – Goblin Fruit, Summer 2012
- Scales of Time – Phantazein, edited by Tehani Wessely, FableCroft Publishing, October 2014

=== Novels ===
- Solace & Grief (The Rare: Book 1) - Ford Street Publishing, March 2010
- The Key to Starveldt (The Rare: Book 2) - Ford Street Publishing, October 2011
- An Accident of Stars (Book 1 of the Manifold Worlds), Angry Robot, August 2016
- A Tyranny of Queens (Book 2 of the Manifold Worlds series), Angry Robot, May 2017
- A Strange and Stubborn Endurance, Tor, July 2022
- All the Hidden Paths, Tor, December 2023

=== Stories/novellas ===
- "Needs Must" – Sincere Forms of Flattery, edited by Olivia Hambrett and Sandi Sieger, O+S Publishing, June 2013
- "Ten Days Grace" – Apex Magazine: Issue 63, edited by Sigrid Ellis, 4 August 2014
- "Bright Moon" – Cranky Ladies of History, edited by Tehani Wessely and Tansy Rayner Roberts, FableCroft Publishing, March 2015
- "Coral Bones" – Monstrous Little Voices, Rebellion Publishing, March 2016
- "Letters Sweet as Honey" - The Fantasist Magazine: Issue 3, edited by Will Waller and Evan Adams, June 2017
- "Mnemosyne" - The Fantasist Magazine: Issue 3, edited by Will Waller and Evan Adams, June 2017
- "The Song of Savi" - The Fantasist Magazine: Issue 3, edited by Will Waller and Evan Adams, June 2017
- "Curiosity" - Holdfast Anthology Issues 5–8, edited by Laurel Sills and Lucy Smee, July 2017
- "Finding Echoes" - Neon Hemlock, January 2024
