= Lovecraft's Book =

1985 novel by Richard A. Lupoff

- Dust-jacket illustration by Jeffrey K. Potter.
- Author: Richard A. Lupoff
- Cover artist: Jeffrey K. Potter
- Language: English
- Genre: Historical novel
- Publisher: Arkham House
- Publication date: 1985
- Publication place: United States
- Media type: Print (Hardback)
- Pages: ix, 260
- ISBN: 978-0-87054-151-3
- OCLC: 11370960
- Dewey Decimal: 813/.54 19
- LC Class: PS3562.U6 L68 1985

Lovecraft's Book is an alternate history novel by American author Richard A. Lupoff. It was released in 1985 by Arkham House in an edition of 3,544 copies. It was the author's first book published by Arkham House.

Originally a 160,000-word manuscript, the published novel was a shorter re-write destined originally for mainstream publisher Putnam. When Putnam demanded even more re-writes, Lupoff declined and sold the manuscript to Arkham House where it became Lovecraft's Book. The original 160,000-word manuscript was believed lost, but a carbon-copy was found in 2000 and the full original novel was published unabridged as Marblehead: A Novel of H. P. Lovecraft (2006).

== Plot summary ==
The story follows a fictional offer made to struggling author H.P. Lovecraft by fascist sympathizer George Sylvester Viereck. Lovecraft is hired to write a political tract in the nature of an American Mein Kampf. In return, Viereck promises to arrange for the publication of a volume of Lovecraft's stories.

Lovecraft accepts the offer because he wants recognition. However, he gradually discovers the people employing him are involved in a much more sinister conspiracy to reshape America. His involvement brings him into contact with events that resemble the horrors he will later explicate in his fiction.

== Sources ==
- Jaffery, Sheldon (1989). The Arkham House Companion. Mercer Island, WA: Starmont House, Inc. p. 137. ISBN 1-55742-005-X.
- Chalker, Jack L.; Mark Owings (1998). The Science-Fantasy Publishers: A Bibliographic History, 1923-1998. Westminster, MD and Baltimore: Mirage Press, Ltd. p. 55.
- Joshi, S.T. (1999). Sixty Years of Arkham House: A History and Bibliography. Sauk City, WI: Arkham House. p. 153. ISBN 0-87054-176-5.
- Nielsen, Leon (2004). Arkham House Books: A Collector's Guide. Jefferson, NC and London: McFarland & Company, Inc. p. 131. ISBN 0-7864-1785-4.
