= Richard Delap =

American novelist

Richard Delap (1942–1987) was a Canadian science fiction writer, editor, and reviewer. He began in science fiction fandom and was nominated for the 1970 Hugo Award for Best Fan Writer. He edited and wrote reviews for the semi-professional magazine Delap's Fantasy and Science Fiction Review in the mid-1970s. After moving to Southern California, he worked in Hollywood as a script doctor from 1981 to 1986, rewriting film and television scripts in pre-production.

He did the initial work on and was the co-editor of the massive Harlan Ellison collection The Essential Harlan Ellison, which his co-editors said "remains a testament to his talent and hard work". Delap died from an AIDS-related condition in 1987, shortly after the first hardcover publication of the Ellison collection by the Nemo Press.

Delap's only work of fiction is the horror novel Shapes, which was co-written with Walter W. Lee.
