= Dungeon series =

The Dungeon series is a series of fantasy novels written under the auspices of Philip José Farmer, who wrote an introduction for each book in the series. The series was written by four different authors, each carrying on the story from the previous book.

The books follow nineteenth century explorer Clive Folliot as he travels through a multilayered dungeon world attempting to find his twin brother Neville. Along the way, he forms a group of similarly lost creatures and persons, and must battle the pawns and agents of the Dungeon's mysterious alien masters. The Dungeon is where beings from countless times and worlds are brought and trapped by mysterious and technologically advanced races—known as the Ren, the Chaffri, and the Gamine—for unknowable purposes. The Dungeon is a place of nine levels, each with a widely differing environment ranging from deserted cities to prehistoric wilderness to Hell itself. Levels can be traversed by traveling through a Gate, typically located at that level's lowest portion. Throughout Clive's travels, he and his growing group of companions run into many twisted versions and plays on well-known novels such as Alice in Wonderland, Frankenstein, Dante's Inferno, The Lost World, and various mythologies.

Each author uses his own writing style. Farmer explains in the introduction to "The Dark Abyss":

"The aim of these is to enflesh as it were, the geist infusing my works. Their works are not spinoffs of my fiction. They do not continue the worlds or characters created in earlier books. They do not attempt to imitate my style, which would be difficult anyway, because I have more than one. These Dungeon authors are feeding on the psyche, the philosophy, the themes of my science fiction adventure stories, though they will, of course, introduce their own during the development of their own works. Every person is unique. He or she, has his/her own brand of amazing grace"

In order the books are:

- The Black Tower, by Richard A. Lupoff (1988)
- The Dark Abyss, by Bruce Coville (1989)
- The Valley of Thunder, by Charles de Lint (1989)
- The Lake of Fire, by Robin W. Bailey (1989)
- The Hidden City, by Charles de Lint (1990)
- The Final Battle, by Richard A. Lupoff (1990)

The true nature of the Dungeon world is left mysterious. At various times in the series, the Dungeon's nine levels has been speculated to be:

- A series of separate planets linked by dimensional gates.
- A hollowed-out asteroid arranged with nine levels, one on top of another.
- Within the Earth's crust, as a series of nine concentric layers, in the manner of a Hollow Earth.

In Spain, the series was published as "La Torre Negra" ("The Black Tower") and the first book as "La Mazmorra" ("The Dungeon"), reversing the original titles.
