= Claire Brialey =

British science fiction fan, writer and editor

- Occupations: Writer and editor
- Writing career
- Genre: Science fiction
- Notable awards: Hugo Award for Best Fan Writer

Claire Brialey is a British science fiction fan, writer and editor.

She won the 2011 Hugo Award for Best Fan Writer, and was nominated for it in 2005, 2006, 2010 and 2012.

She edits the print fanzine Banana Wings along with Mark Plummer. It has been nominated for the Hugo Award for Best Fanzine several times including 2006, 2010 and 2012, and has won the Nova Award for British science fiction magazines in 1996, 1997, 1998, 2005, 2006 and 2009. Earlier, she edited Waxen Wings, which later merged with Plummer's Banana Skins to form Banana Wings.

She has been on the jury for the Arthur C. Clarke Award twice, in 1999 and 2000. She has written and reviewed for the online speculative fiction magazine Strange Horizons. She was described in 2011 by the British Science Fiction Association as having been "a pillar of the BSFA over the last decade or so" and had been its awards administrator among other contributions.
