= Pat Lupoff =

American magazine editor (1937–2018)

- Born: January 19, 1937; Manhattan, New York, U.S.
- Died: October 18, 2018 (aged 81)
- Occupations: Magazine editor; event organizer
- Notable work: Xero (as co-editor)
- Spouse: Richard A. Lupoff (m. 1958; died 2018)
- Awards: Hugo Award for Best Fanzine (1963); Inkpot Award (2011)

Patricia Enid Lupoff (née Loring; January 19, 1937 – October 18, 2018) was an American magazine editor and event organizer. She won the 1963 Hugo Award for Best Fanzine with co-editor Richard A. Lupoff of the fanzine Xero. Additionally, she won the 2011 Inkpot Award and the 2021 First Fandom Posthumous Hall of Fame Award.

== Biography ==
Patricia Enid Loring was born on January 19, 1937 in Manhattan. She was the daughter of Ruth and Benjamin Baxter Loring, a lawyer who later "went into the metal fabrication business and did very well with it." She attended Birch Wathen Lenox School.

She married Richard A. Lupoff in 1958, whom she had met on a blind date, after the latter got enough pay at Sperry Rand. They had three children and remained married until her death. They lived in Westchester County, then on the Upper East Side of Manhattan, then in Poughkeepsie, and eventually in Northern California.

She and Richard were two of the three co-editors of the fanzine Xero, for which they won the 1963 Hugo Award for Best Fanzine. She and Richard also organized fandom events in New York City, including the city's Eastercon and Futurian Society meetings, and Mike Glyer said that the two were known as "the lineal ancestors of comics fandom". In 1970, she encouraged Richard to go into full-time science fiction writing.

She and Richard were nominated for the 2005 Hugo Award for Best Related Work for their book The Best of Xero, losing to The Cambridge Companion to Science Fiction. She and Richard were among the 2011 winners of the Inkpot Award. She and Richard were speakers at the Sacramento City Library's Tarzan centennial commemoration in August 2012. She and Richard won the 2021 First Fandom Posthumous Hall of Fame Award.

Outside of fandom, she was an employee at Cody's Books and Dark Carnival in Berkeley, California.

Lupoff died on October 18, 2018.

== Awards ==
Year	Title	Award	Result	Ref.
1963	Xero	Hugo Award for Best Fanzine	Won	
2005	The Best of Xero	Hugo Award for Best Related Work	Nominated	
2011		Inkpot Award	Won	
