= Lola Robles =

Spanish science fiction writer

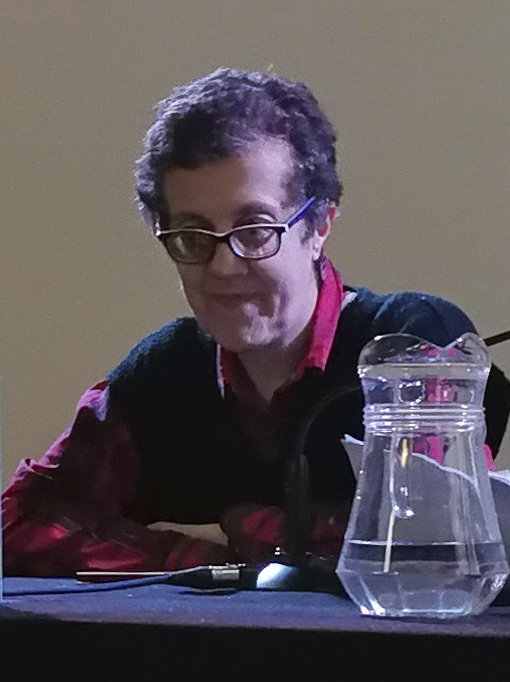
- Born: September 17, 1963 (age 62); Madrid
- Occupation: science fiction writer
- Known for: En regiones extrañas

Lola Robles, born September 17, 1963, in Madrid, is a Spanish science fiction writer.

She defines herself as feminist, pacifist and queer.

== Biography ==
As a teenager, she imagined a planet where everyone was intelligent and handsome and able to negotiate and agree peacefully on any action. It was loosely inspired by Ursula K Le Guin's The Dispossessed. This planet became Concordia much later.

She studied Spanish philology but worked professionally in other fields. Between 1987 and 2002, she worked as clerk and as a civil servant until her vision faltered and obliged her to retire.

She contributed to Clara Obligado's literary workshops during five years. From 1986 to 2002, she worked at the Biblioteca de Mujeres de Madrid where she coordinated cultural events, conferences and workshops, while also managing the budgets and financial aspects. In 1994, she was one of the founders of the Library and documentation networks for women. Her works appeared in anthologies, among which Ábreme con cuidado (Dos Bigotes, 2015), where she wrote a text inspired by the writer Carson McCullers.

She has been teaching the Fantastikas workshop, in which she analyzed the contribution of authors and readers to fantasy and science fiction from a feminist perspective. Fantastikas is also the name given to her blog, which she updates with reviews of the books she has been reading.

== Description of her literary works ==
Robles published her first novel in 1999, when women female science fiction writers in Spain were scarce, with Elia Barceló leading. However, the hypermasculinized tropes in science fiction literature evolved towards a naturalness in dealing with gender and identity issues that she believes her generation lacked.

Her first books adopt an anthropological approach, inspired by Ursula K. Le Guin. La rosa de las nieblas describes navigators sent on a mission and encountering a native feudal society. El informe Monteverde is the story of a scholar travelling to a paradise planet. Yabarí published in 2017 is written as a tribute to The Word for World is Forest by Le Guin.

Robles is the author of novels such as El informe Monteverde (1999), Flores de Metal (2007). For her essay, En regiones extrañas: un mapa de la ciencia ficción, lo fantástico y lo maravilloso (2016), she won the Ignotus Award, one of the most prestigious science fiction awards in Spain. In 2019, she compiled, together with Teresa López Pellisa, an anthology of science fiction stories by Spanish authors.

Más allá de Concordia, published in 2023, is a utopia of an unperfect utopian society in construction which borrows from the universes of Le Guin and StarTrek but also her own novel El árbol de Sefarad published in 2018. Robles has argued that the fashion for dystopias is over, and that it is harder to write an utopia.

The Tree of Sefarad depicts self-sufficient and pacifist communes distributed functioning as collective climate shelters and serving as the setting for a hypothetical peace process between Israel and Palestine.

In Concordia, these communes form entire planet in a pacifist, environmentalist and queer utopia. On the other hand, Concordia is a planet that receives refugees from other worlds that are more technologically backward and that maintain traditions inspired by the sworn virgins of Albania – women who renounce sex and become for practical purposes men and heads of families. This is considered barbaric by the Concordians.

Infiltradas published in 2019, is a collection of essays on science fiction, horror and fantasy in Spain written from a feminist perspective. The book won an Ignatus Award.

In 2021, she published the essay Identidades confinadas. La construcción de un conflicto entre feminismo, activismo trans y teoría queer.

== Works ==
=== Novels ===
- La Rosa de las nieblas (in Spanish). Kira. 1999.
- El informe Monteverde: primera aproximación al est (in Spanish). Equipo Sirius. 2005.
- Flores de metal (in Spanish). Equipo Sirius. 2007.
- Yabarí (in Spanish). Cerbero. 2017.
- El informe Monteverde (in Spanish). Crononauta. 2018.
- El árbol de Sefarad (in Spanish). Cerbero. 2018.
- Más allá de Concordia. consonni. 2023.

=== Tales ===
- Amargarita Páez: relatos (in Spanish). Mujer Palabra. 2002.
- Robles, Lila; Regueiro, María Concepción (2013). Historias del Crazy Bar y otros relatos de lo imposible (in Spanish).

=== Essays ===
- En regiones extrañas: un mapa de la ciencia ficción, lo fantástico y lo maravilloso (in Spanish). Palabaristas Press. 2016.
- Infiltradas, 2019
- Identidades confinadas. La construcción de un conflicto entre feminismo, activismo trans y teoría queer (2021)

== Awards ==
- Premio Ignotus for the best essay in 2017 for En regiones extrañas.
- Premio Ignotus for Infiltradas in 2019.
- Premio Gabriel awarded in 2020 by PÓRTICO, Asociación Española de Fantasía, Ciencia Ficción y Terror, for her contribution to the world of science fiction.
