= Jacques Spitz =

French novelist (1896–1963)

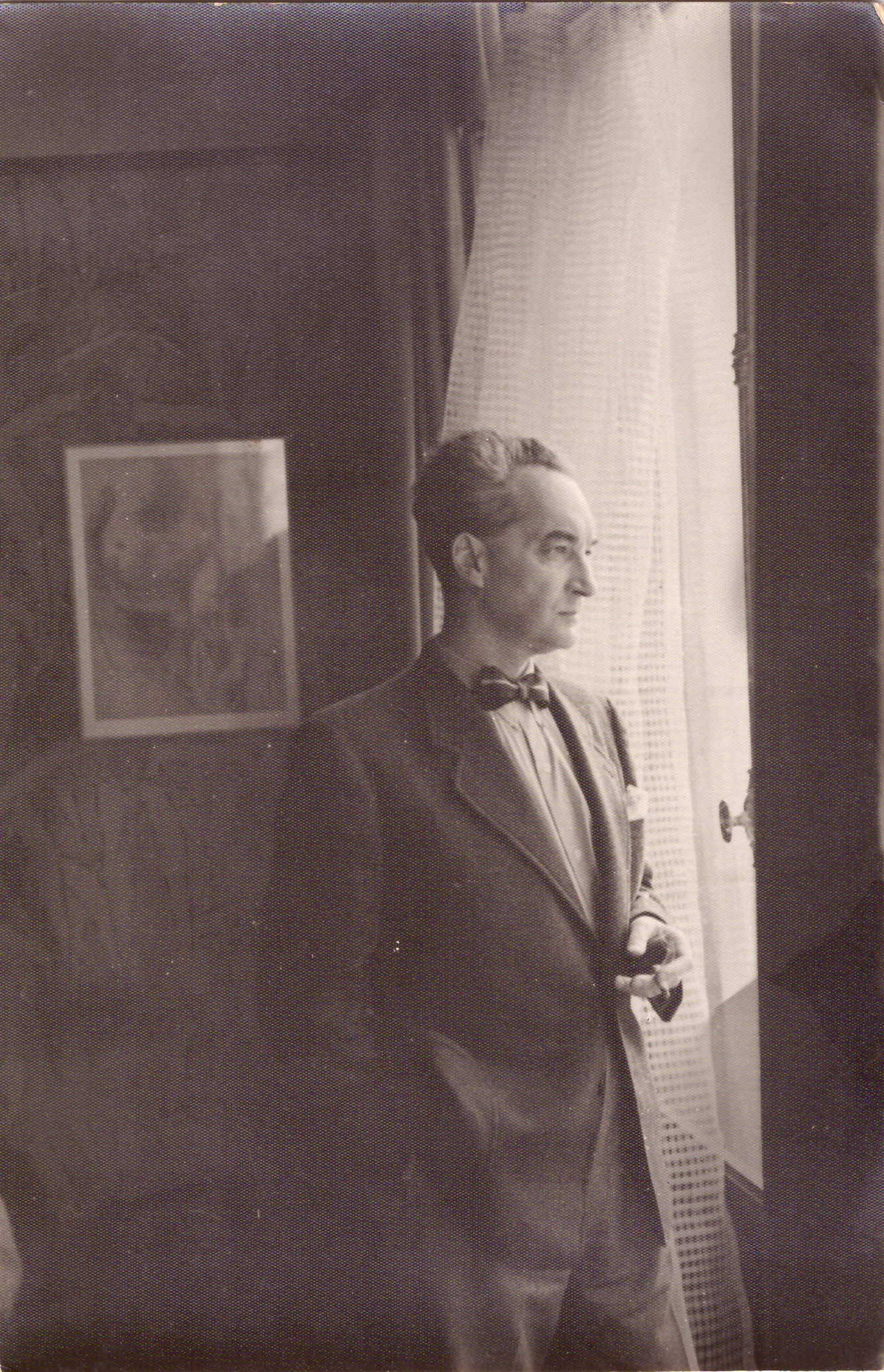
Jacques Spitz

Jacques Spitz (1 October 1896, in Nemours [now Ghazaouet, Algeria] – 16 January 1963, in Paris) was a French novelist.

Spitz was an engineer; he wrote several science fiction novels which were greatly influential in European science fiction. Cynical, ironic, often pessimist, influenced by Surrealism, his style is reminiscent of Pierre Boulle's. Although some of his novels were reissued in France , he is mostly forgotten and his novels are very difficult to find, even in France. However, some of his works has been translated into Italian: L'œil du purgatoire, L'Homme Élastique, La Guerre des Mouches, and Les Signaux du Soleil (the latter being published in 2009). At least one novel was translated into Swedish: L'Agonie du Globe (När jorden rämnade, 1937). Two of his novels were translated into Greek: Les Évadés de l'an 4000 (Οι Δραπέτες του 4.000 μΧ, 1971) and L'Expérience du Dr. Mops (Κραυγή από το Μέλλον, 1971)

His masterworks are considered to be La guerre des mouches, L'homme élastique, and L'œil du purgatoire. The latter, meaning "The Eye of Purgatory", is about a man whose eyes, due to an exotic bacterium, start to see things as they will appear in the future.

== Works ==
- La Croisière Indécise (1926)
- La Mise en Plis (1928)
- Le Vent du Monde (1928)
- Le Voyage Muet (1930)
- Les Dames de Velours (1933)
- L'Agonie du Globe (1935)
- Les Évadés de l'an 4000 (1936)
- L'Homme Élastique (1938)
- La Guerre des Mouches (1938)
- L'Expérience du Dr. Mops (1939) (translated by Brian Stableford in The Eye of Purgatory (2010) ISBN 978-1-935558-64-4)
- La Parcelle "Z" (1942)
- Les Signaux du Soleil (1943)
- L'Œil du Purgatoire (1945) (translated by Brian Stableford in The Eye of Purgatory (2010) ISBN 978-1-935558-64-4)
- La Forêt des Sept-Pies (1946)
- Albine au Poitrail (1956)
