= Vintage dance =

Recreation of historical dance styles

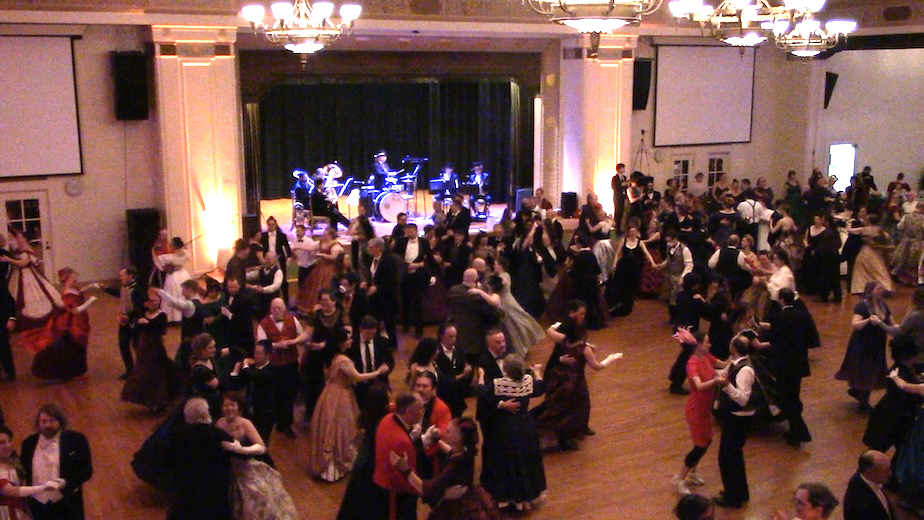
Vintage dancers waltzing at the Gaskell Ball

Vintage dance is the authentic recreation of historical dance styles.

Vintage dancing styles include jazz, swing, blues, disco, and breakdancing.

== Societies ==
Several vintage dance societies hold balls and events to promote and teach vintage dances.

=== Connecticut ===
- Hartford Underground is a vintage swing dance society in the greater Hartford area.
- The community dance hall Vinnie's Jump & Jive in Middletown frequently hosts swing and blues dance nights.
- Yale Swing, Blues, and Fusion is a "noncompetitive swing and blues dancing community" on Yale University's campus. Their "regular events include monthly swing dances, weekly swing, blues, and fusion practica on Sundays, weekly fusion practica on Tuesdays, and trips to local dancing events." They "offer Lindy Hop and Blues lessons every semester, for a nominal fee, and invite guest instructors for dance workshops at various points throughout the year. Their "events are open to everyone – undergraduate and graduate students, faculty and staff, and members of the broader New Haven community."

=== Massachusetts ===
- The Commonwealth Vintage Dancers have been active for more than 26 years and sponsor monthly vintage Victorian dance classes and balls throughout the greater Boston area. Every summer, the group gathers in Newport, Rhode Island, for week-long dance training, seaside teas, and evenings enjoying the splendors of the Gilded Age.

=== California ===
- The Gaskell Ball is a long-running bimonthly Victorian Ball held in Oakland, California.
- The Period Events and Entertainments Reenactment Society holds themed vintage dance events of various eras on the first Saturday of each month.
- The Bay Area Country Dance Society promotes, preserves, and teaches traditional English and American music and dance in the San Francisco Bay area.
- The Bay Area English Regency Society, another group in the San Francisco Bay area, specializes in the dances of the English Regency.

=== Colorado ===
- American Vernacular Dance hosts ragtime-era vintage dance events with live music, principally at the Avalon Ballroom in Boulder, Colorado. This organization hosted its first event "The Columbine Ball and Tango Trot", in June 1989. It has hosted ragtime-era tea dances monthly since 1991 with the Mont Alto Ragtime and Tango Orchestra. It co-hosts annual dance weekends with vintage dance historian and dancing master Richard Powers.
- Watch Your Step! is a Boulder, Colorado-based group available for presentations, costumed performances, and instruction in vintage dance of the ragtime era through the 1930s.

=== New Jersey ===
- The Mid-Atlantic Center for the Arts and Humanities, a nonprofit organization committed to preservation, interpretation, and cultural enrichment for Cape May's residents and visitors, has been sponsoring vintage dance weekends in Cape May for more than 20 years. Held each April and October, these weekends provide instruction and costume dance opportunities with live music. Cape May is a National Historic landmark city at the southernmost tip of New Jersey with an unparalleled collection of Victorian-era homes.

=== North Carolina ===
- Since 2001, Triangle Vintage Dance has offered classes focusing on dances from the Victorian and ragtime eras for the Raleigh-Durham-Chapel Hill area. In addition to classes and a monthly dance mixer, the group also holds an annual Victorian Ball.

=== Ohio ===
- >Flying Cloud Academy of Vintage Dance>, in Cincinnati Ohio, is dedicated to the preservation, performance, and teaching of historic ballroom dance and music. The group creates and maintains a thriving vintage dance community, which provides opportunities for dancers at all levels to enjoy authentic historic dance and other related traditions. They share the love of dance through classes, performances, and the recreation of elegant evenings of dancing in period settings.
