= An American Ballroom Companion =

Online collection of dance manuals

An American Ballroom Companion is an online collection of over two hundred social dance manuals at the Library of Congress related to the period of cca. 1490--1920. Along with social dance instruction manuals, this online presentation also includes a significant number of antidance manuals, histories, treatises on etiquette, information about theatrical dance.

The collection presents dance materials from various locations of the Library: General Collections, the Music Division, and the Rare Book and Special Collections Division.

The collection also presents a number of videoclips to illustrate the materials. The clips were recorded on several Library of Congress events starting from the 100th anniversary of the Library's Jefferson Building held in 1997.
