= Richard A. Lupoff =

American author (1935–2020)

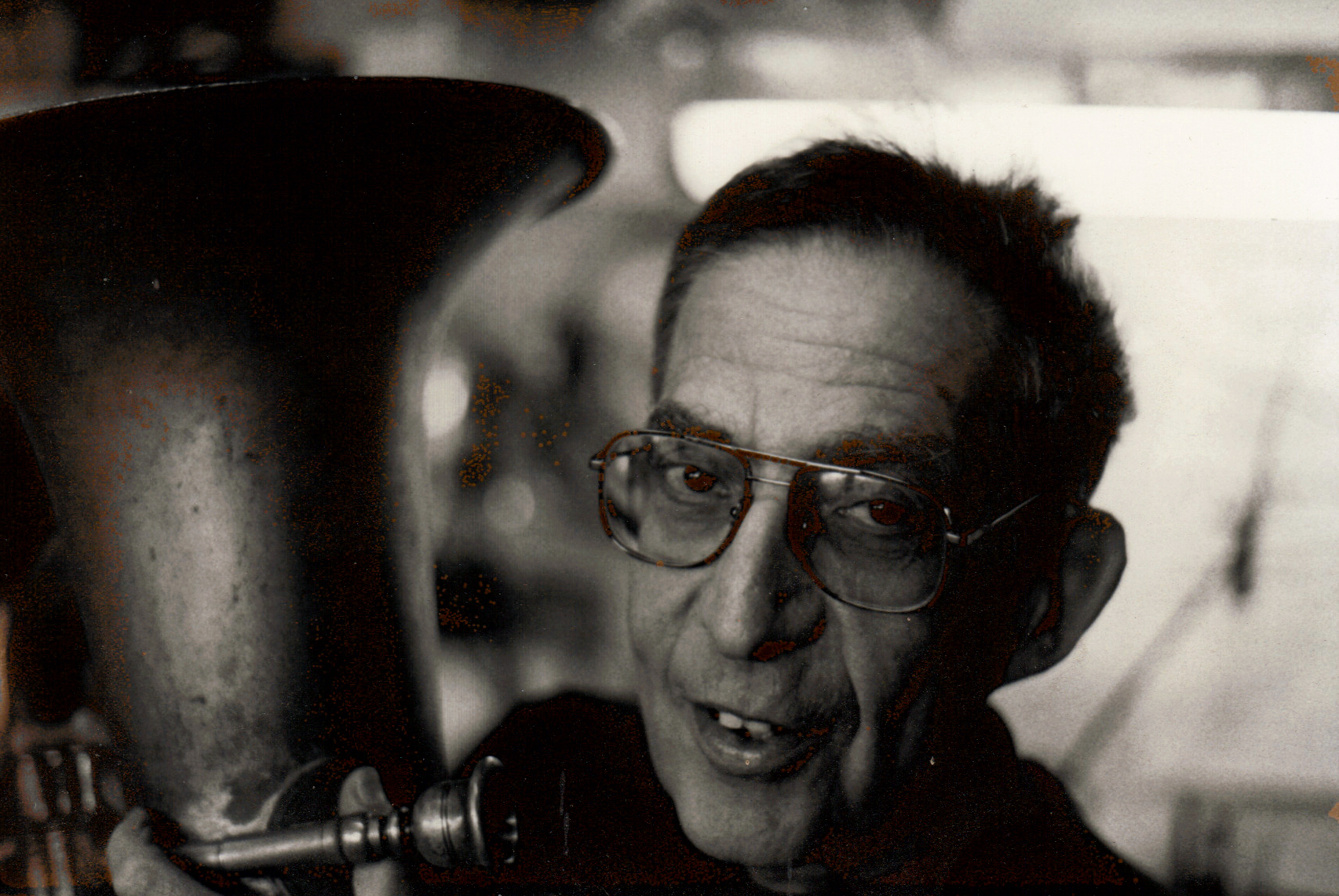
- Lupoff in 2013
- Born: Richard Allen Lupoff; February 21, 1935; Brooklyn, New York, U.S.
- Died: October 22, 2020 (aged 85); Berkeley, California, U.S.
- Education: University of Miami
- Occupation: Writer
- Spouse: Pat Lupoff
- Writing career
- Pen name: Ova Hamlet; Robert A. Mainline; Ray Razzberry; Addison Steele II; Addison E. Steele; A. E. Van Hocked
- Genres: Science fiction, mystery, horror
- Notable works: Master of Adventure: The Worlds of Edgar Rice Burroughs; Space War Blues; 12:01 PM; Lovecraft's Book

Richard Allen Lupoff (February 21, 1935 – October 22, 2020) was an American science-fiction and mystery author, who also wrote humor, satire, nonfiction and reviews. In addition to his two dozen novels and more than 40 short stories, he also edited science-fantasy anthologies. He was an expert on the writing of Edgar Rice Burroughs, and had an equally strong interest in H. P. Lovecraft. He also co-edited the non-fiction anthology All in Color For a Dime (with Don Thompson), which has been described as "the very first published volume dedicated to comic book criticism"; as well as its sequel, The Comic-Book Book.

== Early life and education ==
Born February 21, 1935, in Brooklyn, New York, into a Jewish family, Lupoff studied at the University of Miami, where he continued a career as a freelance journalist that began when he was 14.

== Technology career ==
After completion of his degree and military service, Lupoff worked as a technical writer at Sperry Univac for five years, then at IBM for seven years, where his duties centered on directing informational films. The recession of the late 1970s caused him to return temporarily to employment in technology.

== Writing career ==
He began his writing career in science-fiction fandom in the early 1950s, producing eight mimeographed copies of his own fanzine, SF52, and later working on others, including reviews for Algol and in the early 1960s, editing Xero with his wife Pat and Bhob Stewart. Xero's contributors included Dan Adkins, James Blish, Lin Carter, Avram Davidson, L. Sprague de Camp, Roger Ebert (then 19 years of age), Harlan Ellison, Ed Gorman, Eddie Jones, Roy G. Krenkel, Frederik Pohl, and Bob Tucker; it received the Hugo Award for Best Fanzine in 1963. In 2004, a hardcover anthology, The Best of Xero, coedited with Pat Lupoff and featuring a nostalgic introduction by Ebert, was published by Tachyon Publications. It was, in turn, nominated for the Hugo Award.

Lupoff was an editor of Edgar Rice Burroughs for Canaveral Press, and in 1965, at the request of the company's owners, wrote a biography of Burroughs, Edgar Rice Burroughs: Master of Adventure, his first book.

=== Science fiction ===
He began publishing fiction in 1967 with the novel One Million Centuries, and became a full-time writer in 1970. His next novels were Sacred Locomotive Flies (1971) and Into the Aether (1974); he is credited with more than 50 books, plus short fiction, nonfiction, and memoirs. He sometimes wrote under pseudonyms, such as Addison E. Steele, which he used for Buck Rogers novels, and Ova Hamlet, which he frequently used for parodies, collected in The Ova Hamlet Papers in 1975. Pastiche of other authors' styles and story settings and use of other authors and friends as characters are features of his writing.

Among his best-known novels are the duology Circumpolar! (1984) and Countersolar! (1987). His novel Sword of the Demon was nominated for the 1977 Nebula Award. Robert Silverberg described it as "a strange and austerely beautiful fable that cuts across genre lines."

His short fiction, which has often been collected and anthologized, includes the 1973 short story "12:01 PM", which was adapted into both the Oscar-nominated short film 12:01 pm (1990) and the TV movie 12:01 (1993). Lupoff appeared in both films as an extra. The major plot device is a time loop, and bears great similarity to that of 1993's Groundhog Day. Lupoff and Jonathan Heap, director of the 1990 film, were "outraged" by the apparent theft of the idea, but after six months of lawyers' conferences, they decided to drop the case against Columbia Pictures.

His novelette "After the Dreamtime" and his short story "Sail the Tide of Mourning" received Hugo Award nominations in 1975 and 1976. Steve Stiles and his collaborative graphic novel The Adventures of Professor Thintwhistle and his Incredible Aether Flyer, originally a series of comic strips in Heavy Metal, is considered a forerunner of steampunk.

=== Mystery ===
Returning to full-time writing, he turned, instead, to mystery. The Comic Book Killer. published in 1988, has several sequels. His first collection of short mystery stories is Quintet: The Cases of Chase and Delacroix (2008).

== Radio program: Probabilities ==
Starting in 1977, Lupoff co-hosted a program on Pacifica Radio station KPFA-FM in Berkeley, California, that featured book reviews and interviews, primarily with science-fiction and mystery authors. Originally an occasional one-hour program called Probabilities Unlimited, after several months it became a regular weekly, half-hour program called simply Probabilities, which aired until 1995, and was relaunched that year as Cover to Cover; Lupoff left in 2001 to focus on his writing career, and the program was then again renamed to Bookwaves. Among the notable authors interviewed by Lupoff and his co-host, Richard Wolinsky, were Ray Bradbury, Octavia Butler, Richard Adams, Ursula K. Le Guin, and Kurt Vonnegut.

== Personal life ==
Richard and Pat Lupoff were married from 1958 until her death in 2018, and had three children. They lived in Westchester County and then in Manhattan, and later in Northern California. He died in Oakland, CA on October 22, 2020.

== Bibliography ==
=== Novels ===
- One Million Centuries (1967)
- Sacred Locomotive Flies (1971)
- Into the Aether (1974)
- The Crack in the Sky [vt Fool's Hill (1978 UK)](1976)
- Sandworld (1976)
- Lisa Kane (1976)
- The Triune Man (1976)
- Sword of the Demon (1977)
- The Return of SkullFace (1977)
- Space War Blues (1978)
- Lovecraft's Book (1985)
- The Forever City (1988)
- The Comic Book Killer (1988)
- The Adventures of Professor Thintwhistle and His Incredible Aether Flyer (1991) with Steve Stiles
- Night of the Living Gator (1992)
- Marblehead (Ramble House, 2006). The unexpurgated edition of Lovecraft's Book.

Buck Rogers in the 25th Century

- Buck Rogers in the 25th Century (1978) [as by Addison E. Steele]
- Buck Rogers: That Man On Beta (1979) [as by Addison E. Steele]

Philip José Farmer's The Dungeon (Dungeon series)

- First book: The Black Tower (1988)
- Sixth book: The Final Battle (1990)

Sun's End

- Sun's End (1984)
- Galaxy's End (1988)

Twin Planets

- Circumpolar! (1984)
- Countersolar! (1985)

Detective Fiction

- The Comic Book Killer (1988)
- The Classic Car Killer (1992)
- The Bessie Blue Killer (1994)
- The Sepia Siren Killer (1994)
- The Cover Girl Killer (1995)
- The Silver Chariot Killer (1996)
- The Radio Red Killer (1997)
- One Murder at a Time (associated short fiction) (2001)
- The Emerald Cat Killer (2012)
- Rookie Blues (one-off) (2012)

=== Short fiction ===
- Nebogipfel at the End of Time (1978/1979)

Collections

- The Ova Hamlet Papers (1979)
- The Digital Wristwatch of Philip K. Dick / Hyperprism (1994)
- Before ... 12:01 ... and After (1996) Fedogan & Bremer, pub. Introduction by Robert Silverberg.
- Jubilee (1997) (collected in Mike Resnick's alternate history anthology "Alternate Tyrants")
- Claremont Tales (2001)
- Claremont Tales II (2002)
- Terrors (2005)
- Quintet: The Cases of Chase and Delacroix (2006). Crippen & Landru, (2006)
- The Compleat Ova Hamlet (2007)
- Deep Space (2009)
- Visions (2009)
- Dreams (2011)
- Killer's Dozen (2013)
- Dreamer's Dozen (2015)
- The Doom That Came to Dunwich: Weird mysteries of the Cthulhu Mythos (2017)

Anthologies

- What If? Volume 1, Stories That Should Have Won The Hugo, (1980), stories from 1952 to 1958.
- What If? Volume 2, Stories That Should Have Won The Hugo, (1981).
- The Best of Xero, (2005), selections from Xero
- What If? Volume 3 (2014)

== Nonfiction ==
=== Books ===
- Master of Adventure: The Worlds of Edgar Rice Burroughs (1965, a 2005 reprint in the Bison Frontiers of Imagination series)
- All in Color for a Dime (co-ed w/Don Thompson) (1970)
- The Comic-Book Book (co-ed w/Don Thompson) (1973)
- Barsoom: Edgar Rice Burroughs and Martian Vision (1976)
- Writer at Large (1998)
- The Great American Paperback (2001)
- The Best of Xero (w/Pat Lupoff) (2005)
- WRITER: Volume 1 (2010)
- WRITER: Volume 2 (2010)
- WRITER: Volume 3 (2016)
- Where Memory Hides: A Writer's Life (2016)

=== Articles ===
- "What's Left of the Science Fiction Market?," The Writer, May 1956

=== Book reviews ===
| Date | Review article | Work(s) reviewed |
|---|---|---|
| December 2013 | Lupoff, Richard A. (December 2013). "Locus Looks at Books : Divers Hands". Locus (635): 23, 53–54. | Lockhart, Ross E., ed. (2013). Tales of Jack the Ripper. Petaluma, CA: Word Horde.; Ernst, Paul (2013). The complete tales of Doctor Satan. Altus Press. |
