= John Hertz (fan) =

Science Fiction Fan

John Frederick Hertz is a California lawyer and long-time Los Angeles, California science fiction fan.

== Early life and education ==
Hertz came to the Los Angeles area in the late 1960s, after living in Chicago, New York City, San Francisco, and Seattle. He got his baccalaureate degree at Antioch College and graduated from the Northwestern University School of Law. He has been an attorney in California since 1982.

== Activity as a fan ==
Winner of the Big Heart Award at the 61st World Science Fiction Convention (Toronto, 2003), he is active in the fanzine community, publishing the fanzine Vanamonde. Four collections of his fanwriting have been published, West of the Moon (2002), Dancing and Joking (2005), On My Sleeve (2009), and Neither Complete nor Conclusive (2013). He was nominated for the Hugo Award for Best Fan Writer in 2006, 2007, and 2009. His poem "That hill -- a giant" was awarded third place in the 2020 Dwarf Stars Awards (for science fiction poetry of ten lines or less).

The fanzine Argentus (2004) contains an interview with Larry Niven's fictional character, Hanville Svetz, co-authored by Hertz and Niven.

At conventions, Hertz can be found moderating panels, leading Art Show tours, or judging the costume competition called the Masquerade.

He is also renowned for his stewardship of Regency dance. Hertz has perpetuated the Regency dance tradition at science fiction conventions in the United States since the 1980s, with the practice continuing to the present day. Hertz currently instructs dance workshops and choreographs balls across the nation, and has written an article on Regency era dancing, included in the West of the Moon collection. He also wrote The Tenor of Terpsichore: Or Dances in the Fashion of the English Regency as Done By Certain Modern Admirers of the Same.

Hertz serves as one of the Rotsler Award judges.

In 2007 he was sent by the one-time fund HANA (Hertz Across to Nippon Alliance) to Nippon 2007, the first World Science Fiction Convention to be held in Asia. He was the 2010 Down Under Fan Fund delegate to Aussiecon 4, the fourth World Science Fiction Convention to be held in Australia.

He was Fan Guest of Honor at Lunacon44 in 2001, Westercon 57 in 2004, Loscon 38 in 2011 and Special Guest at Boskone 50 in 2013.
