= Vienna Ball of Sciences =

The Vienna Ball of Sciences is a ball held annually in January in Vienna, Austria. It combines classic traditions with contemporary impulses from the field of science communication. Since its establishment in 2015, the Science Ball has quickly gained a reputation as one of the most successful and largest events in the Viennese ball season

== History ==
The establishment in 2015 goes back to an initiative of then-Mayor of Vienna, Michael Häupl, and the University Commissioner of the City of Vienna, Alexander Van der Bellen. It was their intention to position Vienna more clearly as a hotspot for science.

At the request of Häupl, Van der Bellen and then-Science City Councilor Andreas Mailath-Pokorny, science manager and science communicator Oliver Lehmann started the development in the summer of 2014. The ball is organized by the association "Wien Wissen", of which Oliver Lehmann is chairman. The first Vienna Science Ball took place on January 31, 2015. Since its establishment, the science ball has traditionally been held on the last Saturday in January in the festive ballrooms of Vienna City Hall.

== Motto and programme ==
"Decent fun – Dance with an attitude" is the motto of the Vienna Science Ball.

The ball program combines classic elements of a traditional dance ball with contemporary forms of representation and presentation from the fields of science and the arts. The protagonists hail from universities and research institutions in Vienna. Traditional components of a ball, such as the opening by the debutante committee, the Midnight Quadrille and table decorations, are expanded through scientific content. In 2018, a fashion show inspired by molecular biological experiments was held. In 2019, a thermal imaging camera visualized temperature profiles of guests in the ball disco.

== Honorary aegis and ball committee ==
Since the ball’s establishment, the rectors and presidents of all Viennese universities, private universities, educational colleges and universities of applied sciences have formed the honorary committee. Honorary aegis is granted by Federal President Alexander Van der Bellen, the chairmanship of the ball committee and the honorary presidium are held, as of 2019, by EU Commissioner Johannes Hahn, Mayor Michael Ludwig (until 2018 Mayor Michael Häupl), Science Minister Heinz Fassmann, city councilors Veronica Kaup-Hasler (until 2018 Andreas Mailath-Pokorny), and Maria Vassilakou.

== Ball ambassadors ==
One of the special features are the ball ambassadors: people from science with a marked interest in communicating it or from other areas of society such as politics, business, industry and the arts with a distinct (although often not publicly known) connection to science are chosen as ball ambassadors. In the weeks before the respective ball, statements of all ball ambassadors are published on the ball's homepage and on social media channels.

=== List of ball ambassadors (selection) ===
- Michael Köhlmeier (2019), writer and student of mathematics
- Julia Ebner (2019), extremism and terrorism researcher, Research Fellow at the Institute for Strategic Dialogue, London
- Herbert Edelsbrunner (2019), American-Austrian computer scientist and mathematician (ISTA), Wittgenstein awardee 2018
- Ursula Hemetek (2019), ethnomusicologist (Universität für Musik und darstellende Kunst Wien) and Wittgenstein awardee 2018
- Nuno Maulide (2018), chemist (University of Vienna), ERC-awardee and Austria's scientist 2018
- Giulia Enders (2018), physician and author ("Gut: The Inside Story of Our Body's Most Underrated Organ")
- Giulio Superti-Furga (2017), molecular biologist, head of CeMM, part of the Austrian Academy of Sciences
- Martin Nowak (2017), Professor for biology and mathematics, head of the evolution dynamics programme at Harvard University
- Helga Nowotny (2015), head of the ERA Council Forum Austria and former ERC-president
- Josef Penninger (2015), molecular biologist, former scientific head of IMBA, Wittgenstein awardee 2014
- Anton Zeilinger (2015), quantum physicist, president of the Austrian Academy of Sciences

== Prominent visitors ==
Ig nobel prize mastermind Marc Abrahams was the guest of honor at the first ball in 2015, @NeinQuarterly journalist Eric Jarosinski in 2016 and Nobel Prize winner Eric Kandel (Nobel Prize for Medicine in 2000). With the visit of the 3rd Science Ball on 28 January 2017, newly elected president of the Republic of Austria, Alexander Van der Bellen, completed his first public appearance after his inauguration on January 26, 2017. The 4th Science Ball on January 27, 2018 was occasion for the first public appearance of Michael Ludwig as new mayor of the city of Vienna after his selection as chairman of the Vienna SPÖ on the same day. Guest of Honor 2018 was March for Science co-founder Caroline Weinberg. At the Ball 2019, computer scientist Bernd Bickel (ISTA), winner of the Sci-Tech Award 2018 (awarded by the Academy of Motion Picture Arts and Sciences), Nobel Prize for Chemistry laureate 1988 Robert Huber and Austria's Scientist of the Year 2018, chemist Nuno Maulide (University of Vienna) attended as honorary guests.

In 2021, due to the restrictions imposed by the Corona pandemic the ball committee produced a TV show instead of the festive event which was aired on its homepage and social media channels and the local TV station W24.

== Public perception ==
The Vienna Ball of Sciences was well received from its inception. The ball has always sold out despite being held at continuously larger venues.

“In contrast to the Akademikerball (of right-wing fraternites) there were no fireworks or Molotov cocktails at the first science ball on Sunday night. The only danger for the guests was the distribution of the 'Swedish bomb', a sweet Viennese temptation that is not entirely harmless to body weight due to the many calories "(Handelsblatt, February 1, 2015)

“Vienna's academic community often comes off as fragmented and contentious, but by highlighting the core values of 'tolerance, excellence, and creativity,' the Science Ball made everyone feel, for at least one night, like they were dancing to the same beat. "(Science, March 15, 2015

"The science ball promotes diversity, reaching out to students and researchers from all academic disciplines and institutions. (A) clever attempt to associate a big city’s science base with its most distinguished cultural characteristics. And the sold-out event was ample proof that the organizers had hit a nerve. "(Nature, February 3, 2017)

"Wiens universitet dansar för vetenskapens värden" (Dagens Nyheter, February 4, 2018)

"We're about diversity, openness and excellence" (New York Times, February 6, 2018)

"Il Walzer delle Scienze (contro le fake news)" (Corriere della Sera, February 22, 2019)
