= Kaffeesiederball (Viennese coffeehouse owners ball) =

The Wiener Kaffeesiederball (Viennese Coffeehouse Owners Ball), also shortened: Kaffeesiederball is one of the extravagant traditional balls of the Viennese ball season.

The ball is organized annually in the carnival season at the Hofburg Vienna by the Club of Viennese coffee house owners and is accordingly closely associated with the Viennese coffeehouse tradition. When the spatial capacities of the Vienna Hofburg are fully utilized, the ball counts up to 6000 guests. Regular guests include politicians, actors, artists, writers, cultural figures and entrepreneurs from Austria and abroad.

== History ==
The first Viennese Kaffeesiederball was held on February 22, 1957, under the then club chairman of the Viennese coffee house owners, Ernst Weidinger. Over the years, the Viennese Kaffeesiederball established itself as one of the most important balls of the Viennese ball season.

Since 2017, the ball has been organized by Anna Karnitscher, the daughter of the ball's founder Ernst Weidinger and owner of the Café Weidinger of the same name. The costume and set designer Christof Cremer has been responsible for the artistic direction of the ball since 2003 (with an interruption from 2011 to 2014).

== Typical procedure ==
The Vienna Hofburg usually opens its doors to all ball guests at around 7:30 p.m. and official admission begins. As a classical ball rich in tradition, the correct ball dress code of the ball guests is meticulously observed when entering the Hofburg, and in case of non-compliance incorrectly dressed ball guests are denied entry. The dress code for the ladies: Floor-length evening dress or ball gown and for the gentlemen: Tailcoat, tuxedo or full dress uniform (important: no tie, but a bow tie).

=== Opening (Eröffnung) ===
The official part of the program begins at 9 p.m. with a festive opening. After the entry of the guests of honor and the debutantes committee, a welcome note by the ball organisers begins . Following this, all ball guests at the Kaffeesiederball are traditionally invited to listen to a vocal interlude and a ballet performance by different established artists. The opening is concluded with a waltz by the Viennese Waltz Formation and the opening by the debutantes committee. Traditionally, dancers from the Elmayer Dance School open the Kaffeesiederball. All remaining dance floors and stages in the Hofburg Vienna are opened for dancing by Thomas Schäfer-Elmayer or one of the organisers of the ball after this traditional left waltz and the invitation by the words "Alles Walzer" for the ball guests to join. The entire opening as well as other program items on the evening of the ball are broadcast live on the screens in the other halls of the Hofburg.

=== Midnight interlude (Mitternachtseinlage) ===
The midnight interlude is the highlight of every ball evening. The artists of the midnight interlude already included the German pop singer Nina Hagen, the German jazz trumpeter Till Brönner, the Burgtheater actresses Sona MacDonald and Maria Bill, the Austrian musician and actress Tini Kainrath, the Italian singer Peppino di Capri or the Mexican singer Francisco Araiza.

=== Quadrille (Publikumsquadrille) ===
Traditionally, the first midnight quadrille takes place directly after the midnight interlude. This quadrille is performed with the audience and the respective dance steps are announced by Thomas Schäfer-Elmayer for all ball guests. The quadrille is a contradance originating from France, which ends with a gallop. It is typically danced to the music of the Fledermaus Quadrille (op. 363) by Johann Strauss (son).

=== 1 o‘clock interlude (1 Uhr Einlage) ===
Depending on the capacity of the Kaffeesiederball, ball guests in other larger rooms of the Hofburg are offered additional performances. Traditionally, this takes place in the large Redoutensaal, the second largest hall of the Vienna Hofburg. The young soprano Hila Fahima sang bravura arias and duets from the opera and operetta literature as well as songs from the 1950s together with baritone Rafael Fingerlos at the 60th anniversary ball.

=== Ending (Abschluss) ===
The ball ends at around 4:30 a.m. with the reception of a Damenspende (little gifts, ladies are given at a ball at the exit). The Damenspende at the Kaffeesiederball usually includes a limited edition espresso cup, a fan and other items related to the coffee house or the ball itself. Many ball guests take advantage of the surrounding Viennese coffeehouses for a traditional ball breakfast the same morning, as many coffeehouses in the city center are open throughout the day due to the Kaffeesiederball, for example Café Landtmann on Vienna's Ringstrasse.
