= Prom =

Formal dance for graduating students

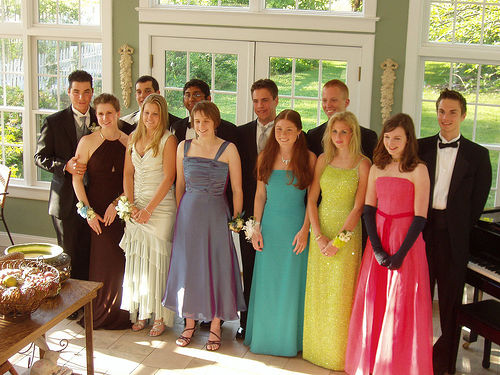
A typical gathering, with boys in tuxedos/dinner suit, and girls in formal dresses with corsages on their wrists

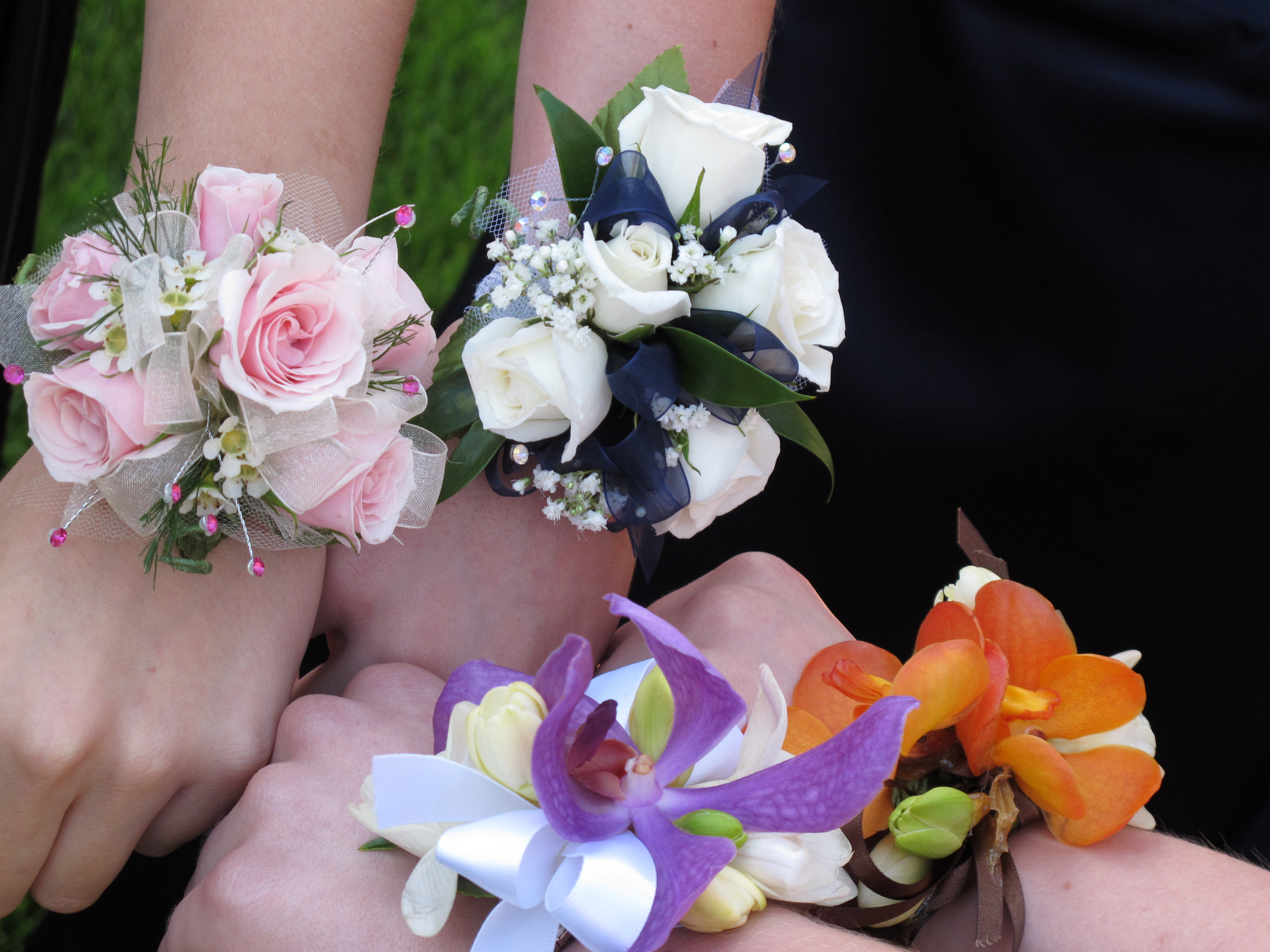
Close-up of corsages

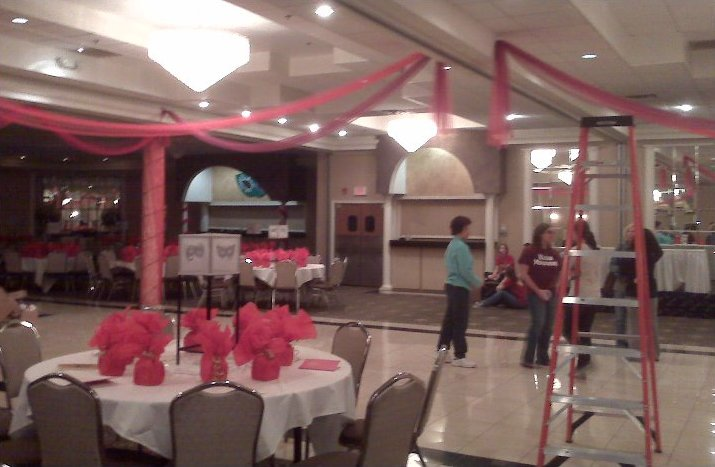
Decorating for prom, students put finishing touches on a ballroom at a banquet hall

A promenade dance or prom is a formal dance party for graduating high school students at the end of the school year.

Students participating in the prom will typically vote for a prom king and prom queen. Other students may be honored with inclusion in a prom court. The selection method for a prom court is similar to that of homecoming queen/princess, king/prince, and court. Inclusion in a prom court may be a reflection of popularity of those students elected and their level of participation in school activities, such as clubs or sports. The prom queen and prom king may be given crowns to wear. Members of the prom court may be given sashes to wear and photographed together.

Similar events, which may be locally inspired by debutante balls, take place in many other parts of the world. In Canada, the terms "formal" and "Grad" are often used, while in Australia and New Zealand, the terms school formal and ball are most commonly used for occasions equivalent to the American prom, and the event is usually held for students in Year 12. Many schools hold a formal graduation ball for finishing students at the end of the year in place of or as well as a formal. In Ireland, a debutante ball or debs may also be held. In Poland and Lithuania, high schools organize a "studniówka" (lt. "Šimtadienis"). The term "prom" has become more common in the United Kingdom and Canada because of the influence of American films and television shows. In South Africa, this event is widely known as a matric dance / matric farewell as students in their 12th year of school are called matric students. In South Asia, its equivalent is a farewell party.

Variation exists between different dialects with regard to whether prom is used with the definite article or not—e.g., whether one says "go to the prom" or "go to prom".

== In the United States ==
=== History ===
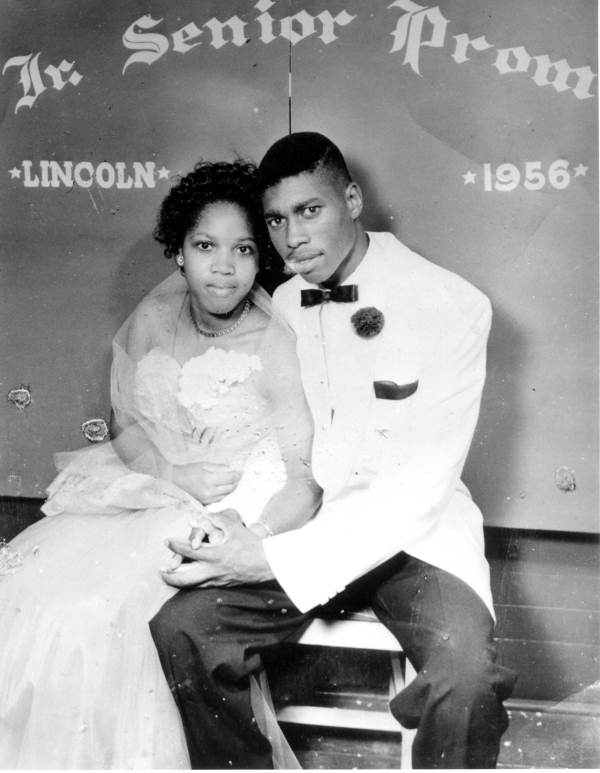
A couple at the Lincoln High School senior prom in Florida (1956)

In the early days of high school proms, the nighttime dance served a function similar to a debutante ball. Early proms were times of firsts: the first adult social event for teenagers; the first time taking the family car out after dark; the first real dress-up affair; and so forth. Proms also served as a heavily documented occasion, similar to a milestone event such as first communion or a wedding, in which the participants were taking an important step into a new stage in their lives. In earlier days, the prom may have also served as an announcement of engagement for the 'best couple' after the prom court had been crowned and recognized.

While high school yearbooks did not start covering proms and including prom pictures until the 1930s and 1940s, historians, including Meghan Bretz, believe proms may have existed at colleges as early as the late 19th century. The journal of a male student at Amherst College in 1894 recounts an invitation and trip to an early prom at neighboring Smith College for women. The word prom at that time may have been a fancy description for an ordinary junior or senior class dance, but prom soon took on larger-than-life meaning for high school students.

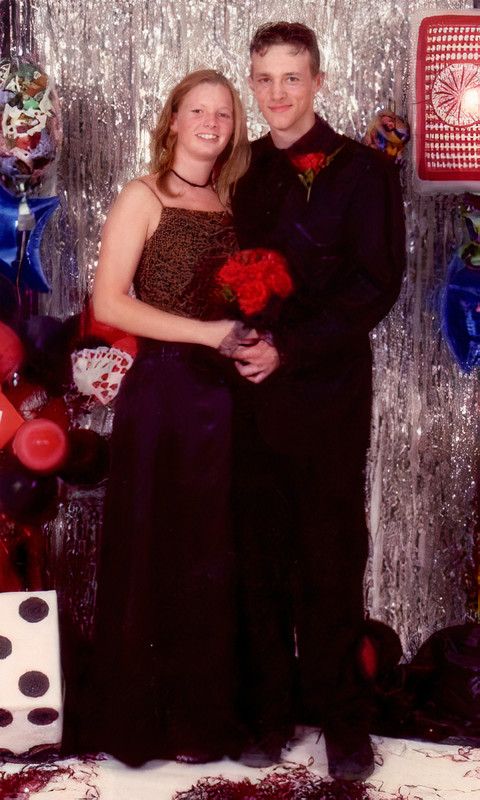
Prom dates at the West Middlesex High School, Pennsylvania, pose for a photo (1997)

Proms worked their way down incrementally from college gatherings to high school extravaganzas. In the early 20th century, prom was a simple tea dance where high school seniors wore their Sunday best. In the 1920s and 1930s, prom expanded into an annual class banquet where students wore party clothes and danced afterward. As Americans gained more money and leisure time in the 1950s, proms became more extravagant and elaborate, bearing similarity to today's proms. The high school gym may have been an acceptable setting for sophomore dances, but junior prom and senior balls gradually moved to hotel ballrooms and country clubs. Competition blossomed, as teens strove to have the best dress, the best mode of transportation, and the best-looking date. Competition for the prom court also intensified, as the designation of prom queen became an important distinction of popularity. Prom became the pinnacle event of a high school student's social life.

Today, prom continues to be a notable event in the social climate of high schools. Popular movies and novels attest to the importance of prom themes, prom dates, and prom queens. In some areas, the traditions of prom are not as rigid as they used to be, with many students attending as individuals or in groups instead of as couples. In 1975, U.S. First Daughter Susan Ford held her prom in the East Room of the White House.

=== Attire ===
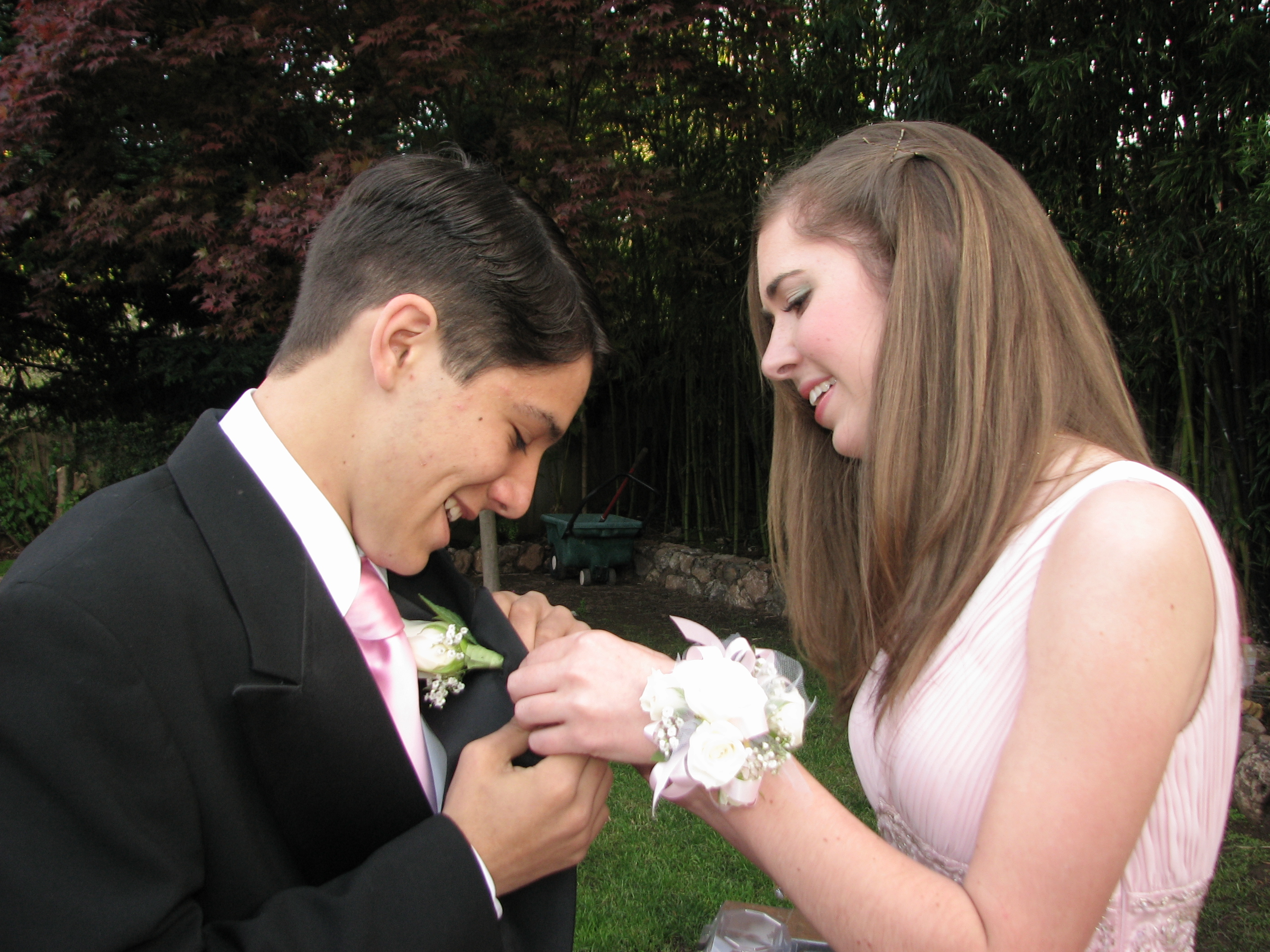
A girl pinning a boutonnière on her prom date in 2011.

Traditionally, boys dress in black or white formal wear, often tuxedos regardless of the time of the event, sometimes paired with ties or bow ties with vests or cummerbunds, in some cases in colors matching their date's dress.

Traditionally, girls wear dresses or evening gowns and adorn themselves with ladies' jewelry such as earrings and a necklace. Traditionally, girls wear perfume and make-up such as eyeshadow, lipstick, mascara, and blush. Girls also traditionally wear a corsage, given to them by their dates, and girls give boys matching boutonnières to be worn on their lapels.

By the 2000s, the clothes girls wear to prom have become more revealing due to the influence of celebrities and the mass media.

=== Promposals ===
A "promposal" (a portmanteau of "prom" and "proposal") is a popular pre-prom tradition where a student asks another to go to the prom with them using some (usually elaborate) method and extra fanfare. A promposal is distinct from the normal prom ask, which typically includes the question, "Will you go to prom with me?" without additional spectacle. Promposals may include concepts and materials from posters, confetti, and balloons to the more viral, elaborate plans that give promposals their extravagant reputation. Examples include spelling "Prom?" with pepperoni on pizza, organizing a flash mob, graffitiing national park land, and using a hot-air balloon. Promposals, due to their flashy nature, often include a social media aspect like livestreaming, taking and posting videos, and other forms of memorializing on social media platforms.

=== Champagne parties ===
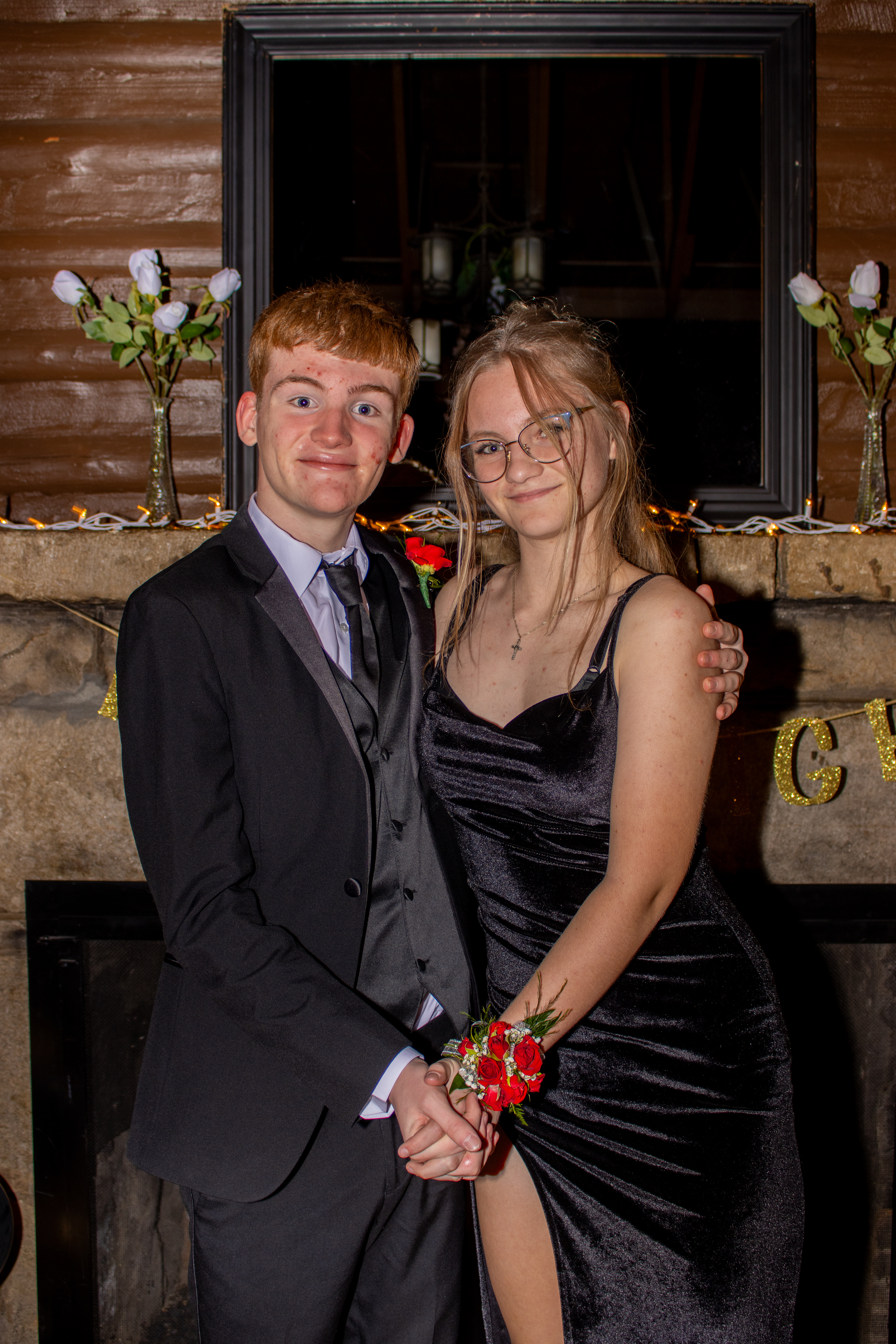
A champagne party at a clubhouse, 2024

Champagne parties, also known as "send-offs", have become a prominent pre-prom tradition in the United States. These celebrations typically take place before high school proms and serve as elaborate gatherings that precede the formal prom event. The concept of champagne parties gained significant attention due to their flamboyant nature and the remarkable cultural custom they represent.

Originating in the 2010s, champagne parties are characterized by their extravagance, creativity, and community involvement. Families host these events to celebrate and honor their teenagers as they prepare to depart for their proms. The festivities often include live music, themed decorations, red carpet entrances, and communal gatherings where friends, family, and neighbors come together to celebrate the youth's journey into adulthood. Attire at champagne parties typically mirrors the elegance and formality of prom attire, with teenagers and sometimes even their guests donning stylish evening gowns, suits, and formalwear.

=== Logistics and traditions ===
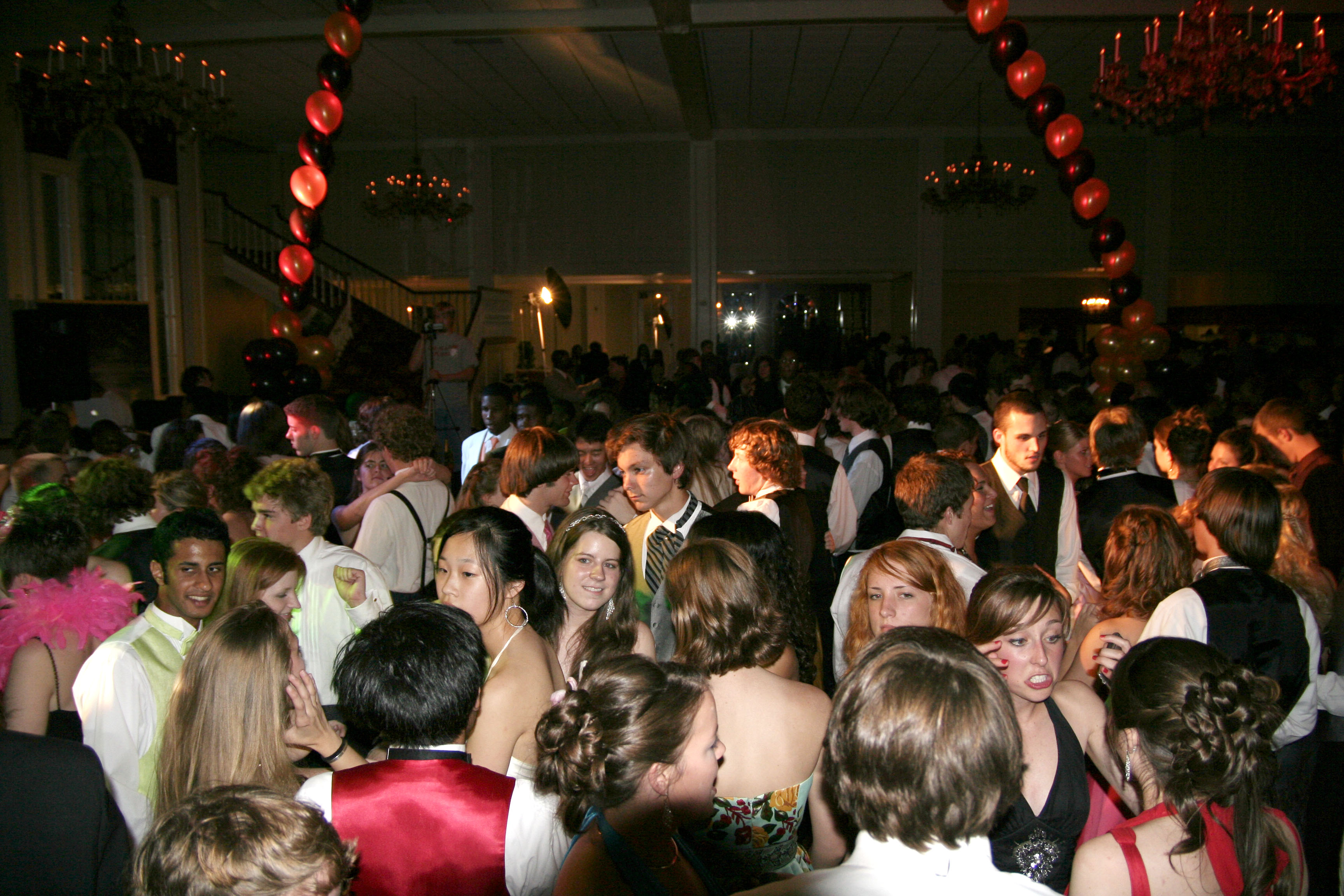
Prom dance in 2007

Prom attendees may be limited by their schools to be juniors or seniors and guests under age 21. Boys are usually the ones to ask their date to the prom. A 2014 YouGov survey of men who went to prom found that 79% of them asked. Of women surveyed, 29% said they asked. Before prom, girls typically get their hair styled, often in groups as a social activity at a salon. Prom couples then gather at a park, garden, or their own and their dates' houses for single and group photographs. Prom attendees may rent limousines or party buses to transport groups of friends from their homes to the prom venue. Some schools host their proms at hotel ballrooms, banquet halls, or other venues where weddings typically take place. The dance itself may have a band or DJ. At prom, a meal may be served. By the early 21st century, prom has become a multi-billion-dollar business in the United States, with each family spending hundreds to even thousands of dollars for the occasion.

Some high schools allow only the graduating class (seniors) to have a prom. Some schools also allow grade 11 (juniors) to have a prom, and in some cases, there is a combined junior/senior prom. Some American high schools that do not allow school-sponsored dances will host a junior/senior prom as a banquet instead of a dance. Typically, students still dress in formal attire and attend as couples. In recent years, American teens have started asking celebrities or famous models to their proms.

=== Post-prom ===
After the prom, parents or a community may host a prom after-party, afterglow or post-prom at a restaurant, entertainment venue, or a student's home. Other traditions often include trips to nearby attractions, such as amusement parks, regional or local parks, or vacation houses. Some of these post-prom events are chaperoned and some are unsupervised. Many post-proms (after-prom events) are at the school, and involve bringing entertainment such as interactive games, artists, and other entertainers to the school, as a means to deter inappropriate behaviors.

== In the United Kingdom ==
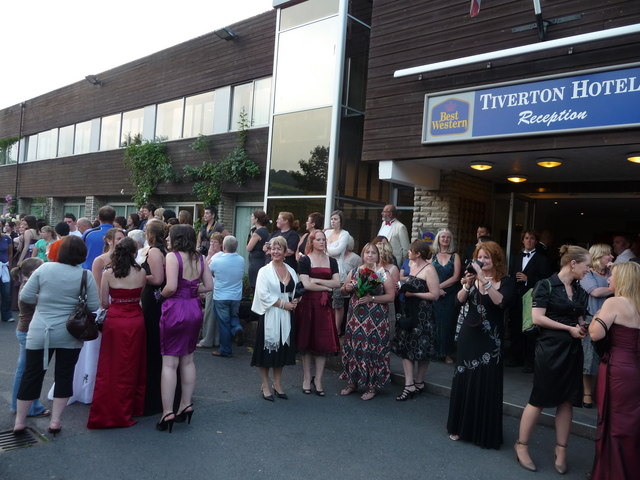
Students and their parents at a prom in 2009

In the United Kingdom prior to the 2000s, many secondary schools would hold events such as a summer ball to celebrate the end of term or a leavers ball to celebrate the end of schooling but, usually, these did not have the cultural or social significance of US-style proms.

In the 1970s, school discos had been another tradition of semi-formal events being held at various times of the year, in particular during the Christmas period, although not all secondary schools would allow such events.

During the 2000s, school proms became common at UK schools, apparently due to the influence of US TV shows. The Daily Telegraph reported in 2012 that:

elaborate 'passing out' celebrations for Year 11 students (aged 15–16) and Year 12 (aged 16–17) have become a cultural phenomenon, stoking passions and rivalries, and refashioning the sense of what a school party should be. More than 85 percent of schools in Britain hold school Proms, which range from no-frills dinners in school halls to tailor-made extravaganzas in five-star hotels with such extras as ice- cream vans and photo booths.

Schools in England, Wales, and Northern Ireland predominantly hold their prom, or school formal, at the end of secondary education in year 11 (ages 15/16) and the end of sixth form (aged 18).

In Scotland, it is usually only held at the end of S6 (ages 17/18) because all high schools in Scotland have pupils up to age 18 years, whereas elsewhere in the UK, many students have to go to college or sixth form to study for A-Levels. Proms are usually held in June, after the end of year exams, although in Northern Ireland, they are usually held in the wintertime near the start of the school year. At Scottish formal events, boys usually wear kilts (kilts are also often seen in the other Celtic regions) and Highland dress outfitters often sell out in an area around this time of year due to demand from school events. Also in Scotland, it is customary for traditional Scottish country dancing (part of the curriculum of all secondary schools) to be included.

== In Australia ==
In Australia, balls are usually held in the spring and summer months for students in Year 10 and Year 12. Some schools may also organise a ball-style event for Year 11 students, aptly named a "social". These events are widely considered to be a "rite of passage" for students.

Traditionally the equivalent of an American prom was called a "deb" short for "debutante ball" in Australia. Later known just as a "ball".

In some schools, Year 10 balls are not sanctioned or officially supported, as few students finish formal education at Year 10. However Year 12 balls are typically officially sanctioned, with the school organising the event. Balls are often referred to as "formals" in lower socio-economic areas.

== Related social gatherings elsewhere ==
=== Africa ===
In Kenya, Ethiopia, Nigeria, Uganda, Ghana, and Tanzania most private schools with expatriates have proms or "end of year socials".

==== Egypt ====
In Egypt, private schools have proms similar to ones held in the United States but with slight differences. The prom is held for a maximum of 3 hours, where teachers attend and enjoy some time with their students. Then there is the "after-prom", where no teachers or parents are allowed, during that time, the real party begins with all the students dancing and enjoying their time. The after-prom can continue to 4 am and 5 am. In some places, there is no mingling of males and females due to adherence to the Islamic codes.

==== South Africa ====
In South Africa, the equivalent of the American prom is the Matric Dance, taking place during the matriculation (i.e., final) year of high school (12th grade). It takes place in various schools across the country throughout the year, starting in February and most of the last few dances for the year happening in late November after final examinations. It usually takes the form of a formal dinner and dance. In most schools, the 11th-grade class is responsible for arranging the event. Sometimes teachers and parents also attend.

The Matric Dance has become one of the most popular occasions on the South African social calendar, but not without much controversy for its cost that, it is said, "could be as much as some people's weddings". The magazine saying this elaborates: "Many parents will be torn between wanting to spoil their youngsters and wanting to resist the extravagance of handing over thousands of rands for a dress or suit that will probably only be worn once."

==== Zambia ====
In Zambia, private schools have a "leavers' dance/dinner" that is planned out by the grade 11 class and takes place on the Saturday after the Friday of their graduation ceremony. The dance is planned for the grade 12 class as well as the upper sixth form class and is normally done the 1st Friday after both of the classes are done writing their A-Level and IGCSE examinations. The dinner begins at 7 pm and the grade 11 class pose as the servers as well as the entertainment throughout the duration of the dinner. The dinner ends at midnight and is followed by the "after-party" which is celebrated at another venue (usually a club) with no parents and no teachers. Costs for renting out the venue are covered by selling tickets to outsiders and the party is usually planned by the graduating classes themselves.

=== Asia ===
==== Hong Kong ====
In Hong Kong, prom culture is inherited from the western countries and is generally called a ball, such as Christmas Ball. This usually takes place during Christmas and summer break. This is more popular in the secondary education stage rather than in universities. Schools, excluding international schools, holding proms are usually single-sex schools where normally the student unions in the schools will cooperate with each other in organizing the event. In recent years, more and more individual unions got united and formed different student unions associations so as to organize large-scale events including large joint-school proms. Except for those proms within the academic field, there are also adult proms for charity yearly where celebrities and government officers always go to these functions.

==== South and Central Asia ====
In India, Bhutan, Sri Lanka, and Nepal, the equivalent to some extent is a farewell party or farewell gathering. The outgoing students are given a warm send-off by the junior students and staff. All the seniors are felicitated with souvenirs and superlatives are given awards. There are also a couple of dances due to the influence of American culture and movies in India.

In Pakistan, there is a prom or farewell function that takes place at the end of the college academic year. Students dress in formal attire. The event ends with a photography session with the graduation.

In Afghanistan, there is a lunch party organized by the graduating students and called "graduation party." This is mostly seen in the university level graduation after the 16th class with a bachelor's degree, this day all the university seniors, faculty members, and professors are invited as honors. There is no mingling of males and females due to strict adherence to the Islamic codes.

In Bangladesh, an event called 'Rag Day' is held at the end of 10th grade and 12th grade. There the school authority decorates the school and make musical arrangements. The students take celebratory preparations like making a uniform T-shirt (generally white) to commemorate the day. The juniors of the school also spend money, help organize the party and give farewell to the seniors. At the end of the party, graduating students play with powdered colors and signs on each other's t-shirt to mark all the friendships they made in their school life.

==== Western Asia ====
In Lebanon, proms are held after the graduation ceremony at night. They are usually held at hotels with a formal dress code, prom dates, rented cars, and, occasionally, prom kings and queens. The interaction between males and females is not limited.

In Turkey, the equivalent is called Graduation Ball. The type of event and the rules applied are created by the student governments and school boards. It is a graduation tradition for seniors.

==== Southeast Asia ====
In the Philippines, proms are popular in high schools. Prom usually takes place in the junior and senior years of high school (especially grades 9 to 12), normally around February or March. Proms are commonly known as JS prom, or, junior-senior prom. Conversely, if a high school has separate dances for juniors and seniors, the term "prom" is reserved for the juniors, and the dance for the seniors is called a "graduation ball" (often abbreviated as "grad ball" or simply "ball"). The associated student body generally organizes the event. Usually, a prom king and queen are chosen. The basis for the king and queen judgment is the beauty and the fashion of the nominee, not the popularity.

In Singapore, proms are held at the near end of a senior year for secondary schools or tertiary institutions. Proms are normally held after the final examinations of all senior students before graduating.

In Vietnam the equivalent to the prom is called liên hoan cuối năm. Some schools hold their liên hoan cuối năm at restaurants, but the majority of schools prefer simple "tea parties" with snacks and soft drinks inside their classrooms. Unlike in other countries, students don't dress up in dresses or tuxedos; they simply wear school uniforms to the tea parties.

=== Europe ===
==== Albania ====
In Albania, "mbrëmja e maturës", as graduation night, is the event held at the end of the senior year. Every school organizes it independently and the event usually takes place in June or July.

==== Benelux ====
In Belgium, as well as in some parts of the Netherlands, senior students celebrate their last 100 days of high school with a special day called Chrysostomos or 100-dagen feest ("100-days party"). Tradition states that on this winter day, seniors are allowed to pull pranks on their teachers and fellow students. Some schools handle a theme as dress code, while others go for the traditional outfit: blue jeans, a black cotton jacket, a black hat (with a red or blue ribbon), and a whistle around the neck. Some even paint their faces and some seniors also carry a spray can (shaving cream or other fluids) to "attack" the non-seniors with. A noisy march through town is also part of the gig. Later during the day, students perform an act at school, usually a silly show involving school or a parody. In the evening, students head to a rented club to party. This involves dancing, singing, and plenty of beer to get a taste of fraternity life. Sometimes even teachers join the party to show that they too have a wild side. In the Netherlands, households where a child who has passed their high school exams often hang the student's backpack on a flagpole which is attached to the front of the house.

==== Bulgaria ====
In Bulgaria, the ball is called abiturientski bal (Bulgarian: абитуриентски бал) and is held at the end of 12th grade, when students are aged 18 or 19. Preparations for the ball begin at the end of the 11th grade, as students are supposed to organize the whole event. It is usually celebrated on the 23rd–25th of May, after finishing matriculation exams. Students may bring a date to the event, which is usually held in a restaurant or a club. Usually, before the main event there is a large gathering in front of the high school's building, where graduates count to 12 (as in 12 grades) and take photos with one other before going to the restaurant called izprashtane (Bulgarian: изпращане, lit. 'farewell send off'). At the main event in the restaurant/hotel, there is music, usually pop and retro. Students are free to dance with whomever they want, even if they come with a date. The school director and the 12th-grade teachers are also sometimes invited. There is usually an afterparty at a dance club. Some people even organize a second afterparty. After the prom night, students usually go on an excursion together for 3 to 5 days. Popular destinations are the Black Sea coast and Turkey. The event is often associated with excess in drinking and having sex.

==== Czechia ====
In Czechia, the last year in Gymnasium is celebrated with maturitní ples ("graduation ball"). This ball takes place before exams are taken, usually in January or February, the traditional season for balls during the Fasching (e.g., List of balls in Vienna). Normally, balls are formal but modern elements are included, too. The students invite their parents, other relatives, and friends to come to the ball with them. The balls usually have a theme and the classes perform choreographed dance routines at the beginning or during the evening. The students also receive a ribbon. It's common that various artists are invited to perform at the ball, ranging from fireshow performers to famous celebrities. At midnight, the classes perform a "midnight surprise performance" – typically some sort of funny act. Sometimes several schools organize a joint event. The income is often used to finance a collective voyage of the students after the exams.

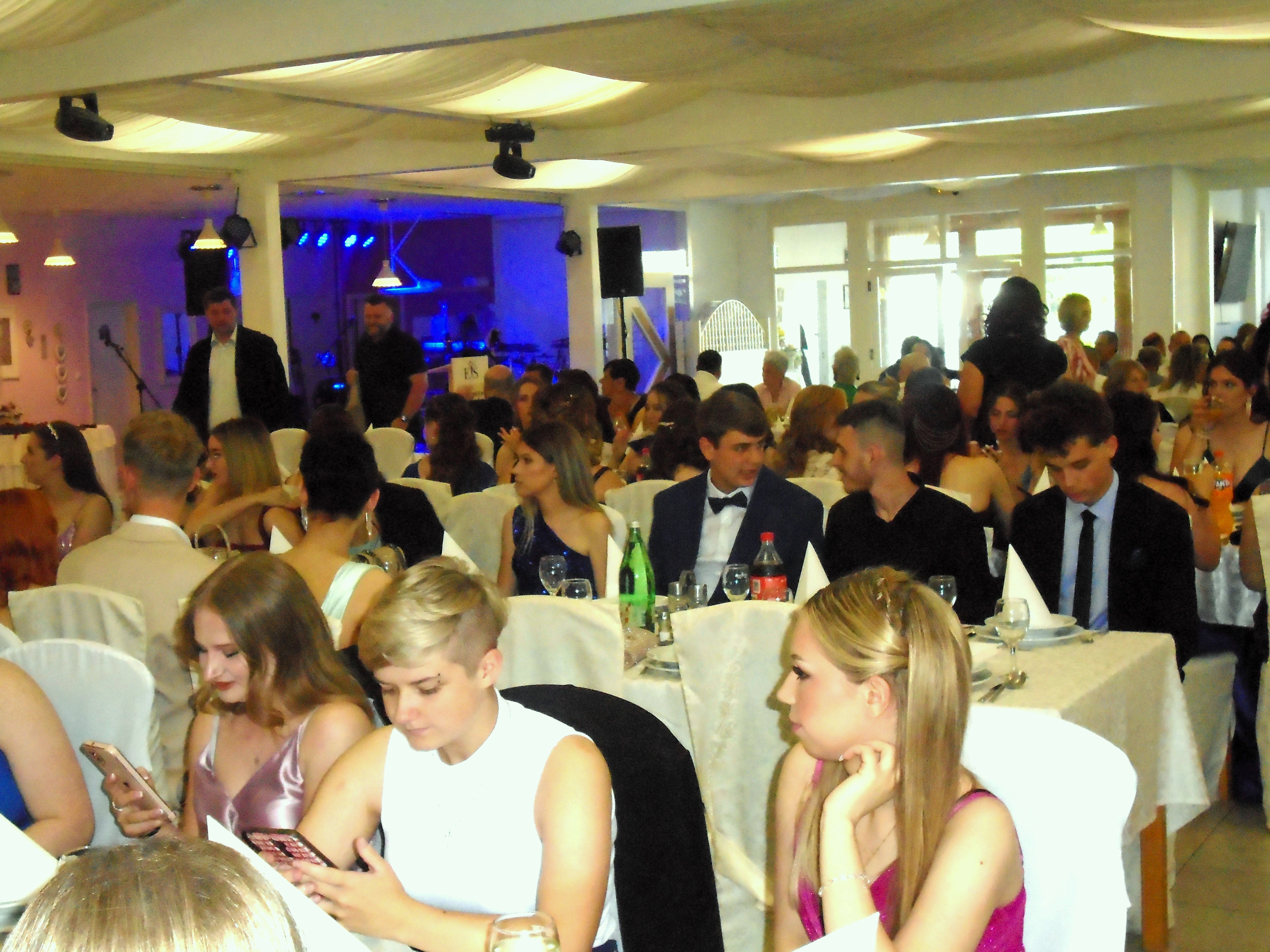
A matriculation dinner in Čakovec, Croatia, 2023.

==== Former Yugoslavia ====
In Bosnia and Herzegovina, Croatia, North Macedonia and Serbia, maturalna večer, maturska večer or matursko veče, as graduation night, is the event held at the end of the senior year. In Croatia, it is sometimes held in January or February.

==== Denmark ====
In Denmark, the prom is called galla and takes place before the exams begin. The word galla refers to the dress code which is dresses for the women and suits for the men. The prom in Denmark is well known for keeping the traditional dance Les Lanciers, where the third graders of high school (the seniors) start the whole dance, then the 1st and 2nd graders join later on (the high school, called "gymnasium" in Denmark, is three years).

==== Estonia ====
In Estonia, the equivalent of the prom is often called Saja päeva ball. The event takes place 100 days prior to graduation and may be organized with several schools altogether. Students can dance but other events may be involved, too, besides ballroom dancing. The clothes are much the same kind as in the proms of other countries.

==== Finland ====
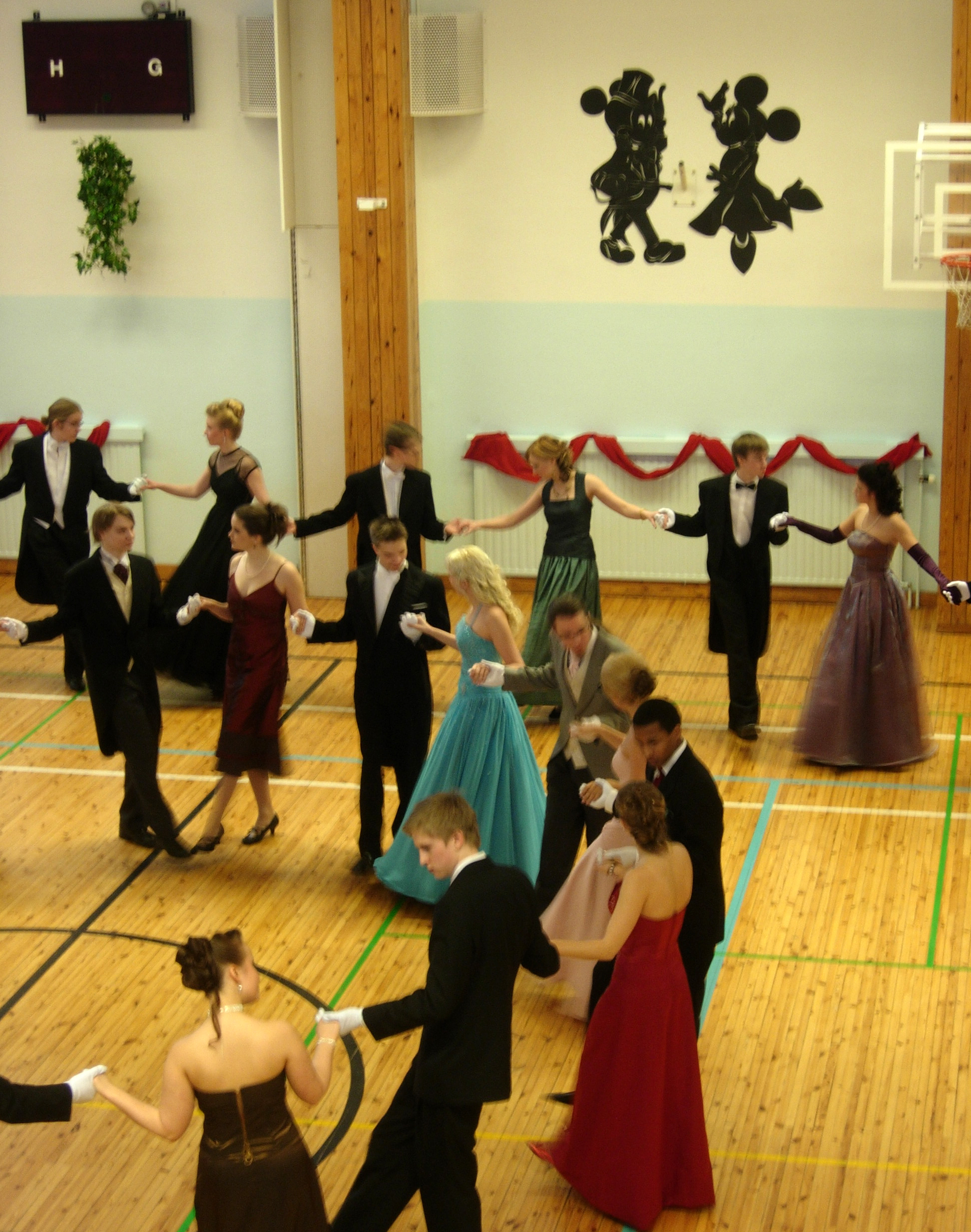
Vanhojen tanssit in the Lycée franco-finlandais d'Helsinki, a Franco-Finnish school in Helsinki, Finland

In Finland, the equivalent of the prom is called vanhojen tanssit (ball of the old). The event is held in February when third-year high school students (the abi) end regular classes in order to prepare for their final abitur exams, and the second year students become the oldest in the school. For the remainder of the school year, the second-year students are called vanhat ("the old", or " the seniors").

For the ball, the second-year students learn 10–15 formal dances, mostly old ballroom dances such as the mazurka or a polonaise. Lately, some schools have begun to allow students to perform their own choreographies with their chosen music, after or in between the old ballroom dances.

In the past, the style was to dress in Victorian gowns and in an old-fashioned way, but these days the attire is similar to U.S. proms. Usually, girls wear a long princess gown or a ball gown. The boys wear most often a White tie (tails) or Dark suit, even Black tie or Morning coat is acceptable, because the ball is not considered a formal evening event. After the ball, the students sometimes attend a dinner in the evening, which is sometimes in a very formal restaurant. Students typically throw a party in the evening to celebrate further.

==== France ====
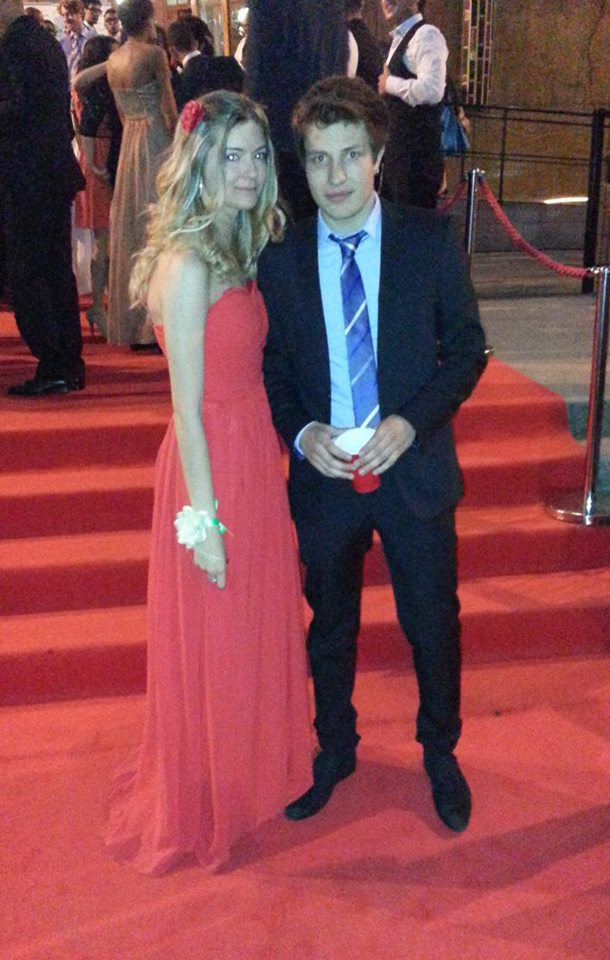
Couple of students in Paris, 2013.

In France, high school students have only recently experienced prom. On June 27, 2013, more than 300 students in Paris, France held a prom. Event planning company White-Tie-Affair partnered up with multiple local companies to host the "Solidarity Prom Ball" charity gala. Food, drinks, venue, limousine, as well as gift bags were sponsored by the different companies and provided for the students for free. On top of that, famous French music groups Psy4 de la Rime and Alibi Montana were the guest performance of the evening. All proceeds from the students' entrance fee were donated to Donnons Leur Une Chance, a French non-profit organization that will help realize educational projects.

==== Germany and Austria ====
In Germany (and Austria), students celebrate their graduation from high school, or Gymnasium, with an Abifeier (from the graduation certificate or Abitur) or Maturaball (in Austria, the graduation exam is called Matura). In Germany, the events are informal and usually contain a series of student-organized activities that tend to make fun of teachers, sometimes with an extended hagiography about the favorite teacher. In Austria, the Maturaball is formal and can be seen as a synergy of proms and cotillions and often are highlights of the regional ball season (between November and the end of Carnival) referencing the glamour of the great ball tradition of the former Austrian-Hungarian monarchy. More like the prom is the German Abiball, that follows the official graduation ceremony. Here the students usually wear suits and ball gowns. The Abiball often follows a certain order with a welcome, introductions, an award ceremony for students, and sometimes an extended demonstration of all of the artistic outpourings of the students and staff. This is followed by a band (sometimes the school's own band, if there is any) or a DJ playing music, usually starting with a waltz before moving on to other dancing. Alcohol is available at these events since the legal drinking age in Germany is 16 (for beer and wine), and most graduating students are 18 or older.

==== Hungary ====
In Hungary, students receive a ribbon to mark the beginning of the preparation for their graduation. Students receive this ribbon at a ball called "szalagavató", meaning the "inauguration of ribbons". Many of the students wear this ribbon on their jackets or shirts until graduation. This prom-like evening dance is traditionally held in the ball season of January–February, but November-December has gained popularity in recent years as well. At the beginning of the ball, after a short speech by the headteacher, each student gets the ribbon from their form teacher who pins it on their jacket or dress. Then a series of choreographed dances begin, which the students learned during the months leading up to the event. The first one is traditionally a dance called "palotás" (palace dance) performed by students from different classes, then each graduating class performs their own class dance, and finally, there's a waltz, which is also performed by students from different classes. Occasionally, the teachers of the school perform a dance as well. After the ball of the evening organized by the school, students usually go out at night to drink to bars and discos, even if some of them are below the drinking age (18 in Hungary).

After they graduate, each class has its own party (without choreographed dances) usually at a restaurant, where their teachers are also invited. This is called érettségi bankett (graduation banquet).

==== Ireland ====
In most of the Republic of Ireland, a school leavers' dance is called a "Debs" or "Grads", except in County Donegal, where, similar to most of the rest of Ulster, it is usually called "the Prom" or "the Formal". In girls' schools, it is commonly referred to as a Debs (short for "Debutante ball", though less formal than the high-society event sharing that name in other countries), and in boys' and coeducational schools, it may be referred to as a Grads or Grad (short for graduation). It is typically a formal dance for students who are graduating from secondary school (high school) in Ireland and is traditionally held between September and October. Alcohol is almost always served at these events, with a meal also being common.

==== Lithuania ====
In Lithuania, the prom is held after final exams, usually the same day when high school diplomas are presented. The event is called išleistuvės.

==== Norway ====
In Norway, this event varies from school to school. It is usually held during the winter months, and is often called "Nyttårsball" which means "the new years ball." The students are not allowed to bring people from outside the school. In Norway, it is the norm to have proms for 8th, 9th, and 10th graders at Norwegian middle school, and most of the time, there is no division between formal and grad – students can attend in whatever clothing they choose, such as traditional knee-long dresses.

==== Poland ====
The Polish equivalent of the prom (studniówka) is a very popular event held each year throughout the country; the word itself means "of or relating to 100 days". Most schools organize such an event about 100 days before the (matura) exam session. The first dance of the prom is the traditional Polish polonaise. In the past, the dress code for the studniówka was the same as for final exams, i.e. a white blouse or shirt with a dark skirt or trousers. As opposed to the studniówka, formal attire is required for the so-called Grand Ball ("bal maturalny"), held after graduation. Nowadays, as Grand Balls are rare, the studniówka has adopted a formal dress code.

==== Portugal ====
In Portugal, there was no prom tradition. However, during the last few years schools have adopted such a celebration. Usually, they happen before the end of the school year, in May or June, and are called "Baile de Finalistas" (Finalist's Ball). Male students customarily wear business suits with dress ties or optionally semi-formal black tie, while female students typically wear dresses or evening gowns, although most schools do not enforce a strict dress code beyond "vaguely formal". It is usually organized by a student association, elected at the beginning of the school year by the students to organize school events.

Although it happens in the majority of the country, on Madeira Island the tradition is a bit different. Instead of having the prom at the end of the year, the seniors have a ceremony called "Benção das Capas" (Cape's Blessing), where they all use suits, including the girls, and a cape that is blessed by the city's cardinal. Afterward, the students have dinner with their friends and family and then go to the prom. However, this prom isn't formal, it ends up being similar to a club but in a different location, although sometimes it may happen at a club. Such a location is chosen by the student association. This ceremony ends up being very similar to one that the Portuguese students have when they finish college. The students only have a date to attend the first ceremony and they tend to go to the prom as groups.

==== Romania ====
In Romania, distinct proms are held each year in high schools and college for both the graduating students as well as the newly enrolled ones. They are called graduation balls and freshmen ("boboci", meaning "hatchlings" in Romanian) balls, respectively. They are usually not black tie (informal). The venue is chosen by the teaching staff and can be any place, including the school gym or auditorium, a club, or a restaurant. It is common to charge students an admission tax in order to offset the cost. One or more bands or singers are usually hired to provide entertainment. Often the event is sponsored by local businesses. Access is usually controlled and limited to students of that particular high school or university, but exceptions can be made for relatives and it is not uncommon for students from other institutions to try to crash a particular prom. Freshmen proms usually include a popularity contest of some sort, which designates 3 girls and 3 boys as places I, II and III "most popular" as chosen by student vote; the candidates have to undergo various entertaining challenges, which usually include pair dancing. Generally speaking, freshmen proms are the more popular, with college freshmen proms often being publicized as club events and promoted by radio stations, who take the opportunity to introduce bands and singers. Whereas graduation proms are more subdued and often not a public or even a school-wide event, many graduating classes choosing to restrict attendance just to the actual graduates and their teachers.

==== Belarus and Russia ====
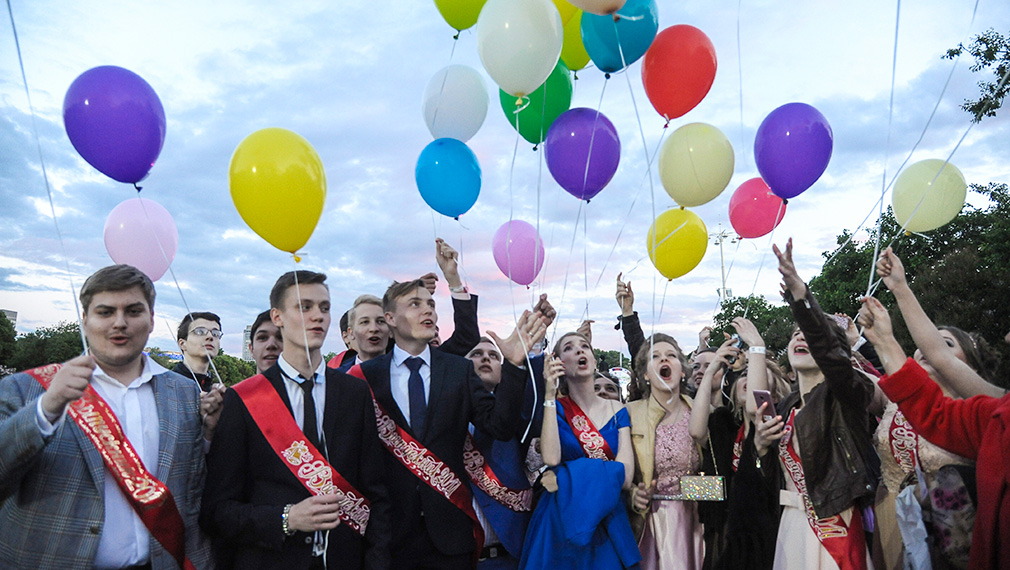
Students at a prom in Moscow, Russia.

In Belarus and Russia proms are called "Vypusknоi vechеr" (Выпускной вечер), which literally means "graduation evening". They take place from 18th to 20th or 23rd to 25th of June, after the state exams are completed. Proms are never held on the 21st/22nd because they took place on 21st of June in 1941, but on the 22nd all graduates were drafted to fight the German invasion during World War II. First, all graduates receive their diplomas. Students with higher grades receive them first. Afterward, the prom continues as a school ball, traditionally with classic dances. Students may choose restaurants, cafes, or ships rather than school grounds to hold the events. Proms may be held in a discothèque, but it must start with the school waltz. At the conclusion of the prom evening, it is tradition to walk the whole night and watch the sunrise in the morning (on a hill, if applicable, in Moscow – Sparrow Hills).

==== Slovakia ====
In Slovakia, the closest thing to prom is Stužková, an occasion when the seniors get together with their parents, partners and teachers to celebrate their upcoming graduation. It takes place in November or December. Each of the students receives a green ribbon with their name on it (thus the name Stužková, the "Ribbon Ball"). The principal and the class teacher are given big green ribbons as well. Many of the students wear this ribbon on their jackets or shirts until graduation. Stužková typically includes a banquet, skits and songs prepared by students, as well as dancing. Men wear formal suits and women formal dresses. One week before Stužková is a ceremony of Pečatenie triednej knihy (Sealing of the grades book) so that teachers will not be able to give tests or do examinations of the students until Stužková. It is connected with some story and recorded on camera and then used as a part of the video of Stužková. It usually starts at 6 p.m. and ends in the early hours of the next morning (4a.m.).

==== Slovenia ====
In Slovenia, the equivalent is Maturantski ples. It is held before the final exams between January and May, depending on the region and school. Students can bring dates and/or close family to the ball. It is a custom that each student dances the last dance of the first sequence, a Vienna Walzer, with his mother/her father. There is also a dinner and live music.

==== Spain ====
In some places in Spain, proms are also celebrated as after-school parties. These parties are commonly called "fiestas de graduación", which can be translated as "graduation parties".

==== Sweden ====
In Sweden, this kind of event is usually known as "Studentbalen". The word "Studentbalen" is a proper noun meaning "The Student Ball," while the word studentbal is a common noun that can refer to any formal dinner and dance at a Swedish university. Studentbalen is usually held during the final weeks before graduating and can be formal.

==== Switzerland ====
The Swiss equivalent of a prom is the bal de printemps. Literally translated, this is a "Spring Ball." At some schools in the German-speaking cantons, it is called "Maturaball." This is not always organized by the schools, but sometimes by a student's committee. It takes the most part before the final exams.

==== Ukraine ====
In Ukraine, prom is called "Vypusknyi vechir" or simply "vypusknyi" (Випускний вечір or simply Випускний), which literally means "graduation evening". The date is defined by a school,; usually any date from late May to mid-June. Usually, "vypusknyi" consists of two parts. The first one called "urochysta chastyna" (урочиста частина, that means "solemn part"), during which graduates receive their diplomas and certificates of honor for exceptional achievements during studying. The first part is conducted in the first part of the day, while the second part usually starts in the evening. The time between the two parts is used to walk around a city and take some pictures. The second part, "neofitsiyna chastyna" (неофіційна частина, that means "informal part"), starts as a school ball, but after a round of waltz, it transforms into a conventional party. The venue of the second part is determined by graduates and their parents; usually, it takes place in school, cafe, restaurant, on a boat or at the country. Traditionally, the second part is attended by graduates, their parents, and teachers. However, school teachers and parents don't mix with graduates. The second part ends with sunrise. Usually, each city has one or a few locations that are the most popular for watching a sunrise. That is why schools try not to have proms on the same date.

=== Oceania ===
In Australia and New Zealand, the event may often be described as a Ball, School Formal, or simply Formal. If the event is in the final year of high school (Year 12 for Australia, Year 13 for New Zealand), it is sometimes called a Dinner-dance, Leavers' Dinner or Debutante Ball but is also commonly called a School Formal or "Formal." In Australia, some schools may also have a Valedictory Dinner, which is like the formal but has students, parents, and teachers instead of students and dates. Some Australian schools also have a Semi-formal for year 11 (16–17) students.

As the name suggests, attire for the occasion is generally formal. Boys will usually dress in a suit and tie. Girls traditionally wear formal gowns or dresses. In most cases a school formal is held at a local reception center or ballroom. A multicourse meal is generally provided. After the meal students generally dance to popular music played by a hired DJ or sometimes a band. Many students group together to go to the formal in a limousine. While parents do not attend a formal, teachers may act as chaperones for the formal and security guards are sometimes hired. The use of chaperones is intended to prevent the occurrence of violence and alcohol or drug use. Generally, after a formal, one or more after-parties are held.

In addition to the high school graduation "formal" that marks the end of Year 12, in New South Wales, Australia, there is also an event that is sometimes held to celebrate completing the School Certificate at the end of Year 10, and always held after receiving Higher School Certificate at the end of Year 12 and includes a dinner and dance. The NSW Government announced the abolition of the School Certificate after 2011, with students in year 10 that year being the final cohort to sit the external examinations and receive the qualification. Subsequent Year 10 "Formals" have been deemed "unnecessary" due to the fact that the majority of Year 10 students now progress to Year 11. In previous years when 25–30% of students left high school in Year 10, the Formal was seen as a celebration for those departing, however, Year 10 Formals are still sometimes celebrated in the name of tradition. In year 11, students occasionally organize a "semi-formal" or "social" at the end of the school year, which is a more casual version of a formal. If a school has a sister school the social is typically organized in conjunction with them, as a "social event" for people to mingle and meet new people. The Valedictory Dinner (or Val as it is colloquially called) is an event that only occurs in Year 12. In New Zealand, most state school balls are held in the winter months, between June and August, while in Australia, a "formal" is held at the end of the year to mark the end of schooling, as is the Valedictory Dinner.

In American Samoa, the typical Junior/Senior prom is held in most of the schools, an exception would be one of the private schools, which lets even 8th graders, freshmen, and sophomores participate in prom.

=== Mexico ===
In Mexico, most high schools and junior high (middle) schools have proms only for the graduating class (seniors), which is sometimes, depending on whether the school is private or public, preceded by a church service. The students dress in formal wear and may attend in couples. Some colleges have an after-graduation dinner dance.

The formals, or as called in Mexico galas or graduaciones, are normally held in the school's gymnasium or in the schoolyard if the school is located in a low-income neighbourhood; normally, though, public schools located in high- or medium-income neighbourhoods and private schools rent a ballroom, usually in a hotel, and students and parents may chip in to cover the costs of the party.

A multicourse meal is often offered in private schools' proms; antojitos may be offered in low-budget proms instead.

=== Central America, South America and the Caribbean ===
Venezuelans also have a prom, commonly referred to as "graduación" or "fiesta de graduación." It can consist of dancing, dinner, and live music.

In Argentina, there are "fiestas de egresados" for students finishing their last year of high school. These consist of big parties hosted by the senior students in local discos or other venues, starting at 10 p.m. until about 5 or 6 in the morning. They have dinner with parents and other members of the family, which may be at another venue such as the school, and on a different night altogether. After midnight friends and other guests join the dance. The parties start in late September after most students come back from their senior trip, commonly to Bariloche, and last until early December, after the graduation. The students may dress formally or casually, and the seniors may wear themed costumes.

In Brazil, bailes de formatura are usual at the end of high school and at college graduation. There is no crowning of a "king" or a "queen," but evening gowns and suits are required. The family may or may not be included, and there may be a live band or DJ hired to command the music.

In Chile, proms, or "fiestas de graduación" (graduation parties), are usually held at convention centers or hotels after the "licenciatura," or graduation from high school. They can also be held after taking the PSU (Chilean University Entrance Exam) in December. Students are expected to dress formally. They are allowed to go with dates or friends. After the dinner, the dance continues through the night into the next day.

In Colombia, many private schools usually have prom balls as well, usually consisting of a dinner, dancing, live music, and contests. They are usually held at hotels or clubs.

In Panama and Costa Rica, like many other American countries, the "Baile de graduación" is celebrated after finishing high school, where grade 11 is also the last year. It usually takes place before graduation to celebrate the end of school. It's normally held in hotels or saloons with a dance floor, music and dinner. It starts with the students walking through the dance floor and dancing a waltz. The dinner comes after, and the rest of the night consists of dancing and celebration.

In Honduras, they are called "Cena de Graduacion", they are held in luxury hotels, also familiars of the graduating students are invited. This event is held only for private schools, the act consists on formal graduation and delivery of their diplomas, after that, a dinner is held between the graduating students and their familiars or friends in the same room which later will become in a dance floor for everyone.

In Peru, proms—"Fiestas de Promoción"—are usually held at hotels, convention centers, or big residences. The dress code is formal. Some parents and teachers are often invited, but they don't stay the whole night. Dinner is served as well as alcoholic drinks and delicatessen. Breakfast is often served the next day, at around 6–7 am. There is a growing tradition to hold a pre-prom for the students in the class below the graduating class, and even a pre-pre-prom for the students in the class below that. Prom students often graduate being 15–16 years old and start university right after.

In Trinidad and Tobago and most Caribbean countries, it is traditional for schools to hold a dance at the end of the CXC/GCE Advanced Level examination period. This is thrown simultaneously for fifth form and upper sixth form students during the months of June or July after the school's official graduation ceremony. It is colloquially referred to as grad or gradz. Most gradz are held in popular clubs, hotels, halls or simply on the school's grounds. Most schools allow students to bring dates, and a formal dress code is usually in effect.

In Uruguay, it is customary for students to undertake a senior trip upon graduation, with the most common destinations being Florianópolis, Camboriú and Bariloche. Additionally, “graduation parties” (fiestas de egresados) are widespread; these are large, formal events typically held in banquet halls or similar venues and lasting until dawn, taking place at the end of the academic year, between November and December. Depending on the school, receptions involving students’ families may also be organized.

== Homeschool proms ==
The concept of extending prom to homeschool students has been realized in recent years. Although some school districts in the United States and Canada allow homeschool students to attend the prom in the school district where they reside, many homeschool groups also organize their own proms. Some states, such as Oregon, Ohio, Georgia, Tennessee, and Michigan, also host statewide homeschool proms, which any homeschool student in that state is welcome to attend.

Proms that are specifically geared toward homeschool students can sometimes be significantly different from traditional high school proms. It is not uncommon for a homeschool student to attend a homeschool prom solo, rather than taking a date. Often the music played is chosen by the parents rather than the students.

== Adult proms ==
An adult prom is a social event that is almost perfectly similar to a high school prom in terms of themes and attire, except that some adult proms also serve alcoholic beverages, and therefore most adult proms (at least in the U.S.) require those attending to be at least 21 years of age. The origin of adult prom is unclear, though two events which occurred in the 1990s are likely to have inspired the concept. Drew Barrymore stated in a late 1990s interview on Late Night with Conan O'Brien that she threw a prom party for herself and a few friends who never got to go to prom. The Class of 1956 from Tenafly, New Jersey, whose prom was canceled at the time, held their own prom for their 35 Year Reunion in 1991.

In the Nobody's Property novel series, character Mallorie Walcott, an event planner, mentions that she helped put her younger daughter Cassandra through college, in part, from the revenue she made from planning adult proms in the 1990s either for people who missed their actual high school proms in the 1970s and 1980s or simply wanted to re-live their prom night. Two other characters, Elise Matthews and Sarah Thompson, did not attend their high school proms and are both referenced as having gone to or hosted adult proms at some point.

A "second chance prom" is a gathering of people who either did not go to prom, wanted to relive prom, or whose high school prom they feel was unsuccessful.

A slightly different take on the adult prom is that of the disabilities prom, dedicated to providing a prom experience to disabled adults at no charge to the attendees. These events are most often organized by non-profit organizations focusing on the disabled, or large churches.

In 2010, Theatrical producers in New York produced an audience participation theatrical play, set in an actual dance hall, called The Awesome 80s Prom, where attendees were at a prom and got to vote on the king and queen from the cast of characters.

== Anti-proms and alternative proms ==
Anti-proms can be private, unofficial proms that are privately created, outside the control of the school, usually by people who disagree with their school's prom policies. Some schools also include the anti-prom as an official event called MORP (Prom spelled backwards). MORP dances can be similar to a Sadie Hawkins dance where the girls ask a boy on a date, they can have informal attire, and the decor can be dark or less elegant.

Proms for gay and lesbian people who did not attend their proms with a date of the same sex are popular in some cities. These proms may also enable trans people who experienced prom before transitioning a chance to attend as the correct gender. A 1980 court decision, Fricke v. Lynch, required a public school in Rhode Island to allow same-sex dates, but discrimination against gay students continued for decades across the country.

== Controversies ==
Proms have been the source of many controversies, many of which involve LGBT students.

- According to Jackie Blount, during the McCarthy era "schools implemented curricula intended to keep youth sexually straight. In effect, schools became fundamentally important agencies in the nationwide campaign to fight homosexuality." This attitude further promoted heteronormative practices such as naming a prom king and prom queen, requiring strict gender conformity in dress, etc.
- In 2002, gay teenager Marc Hall was prohibited from taking his male date to his high school's dance; Hall sued the school board and won.
- In 2009, Tyler Frost was suspended for attending his girlfriend's prom, because his Christian high school disallowed dancing. Although the principal at Frost's school signed a paper allowing Frost to attend the prom, he said Frost would be suspended if he went, but Frost did so anyway.
- In a 2010 Itawamba County School District prom controversy, lesbian high school senior Constance McMillen requested to take her girlfriend to the prom at Itawamba Agricultural High School in Fulton, Mississippi, where they were both students. The principal denied her request and prohibited her from wearing a tuxedo. When McMillen challenged the school's policy, the prom was canceled, leading McMillen to sue the school. Following a court decision forcing the school to hold the prom, local parents organized a second prom in secret, leaving Constance, her girlfriend and only 5 other students at the official prom.
- In 2014, student Katie Bialy from Holy Cross Catholic Secondary School, St. Catharines, Ontario, with the genetic condition Ehlers–Danlos syndrome (EDS) was not allowed to go to prom by her school principal Denice Robertson because her grades were not as good as required and she could not graduate. Her condition had impaired her ability to do schoolwork and she asked the principal if she could go as a guest, but the principal refused her the option. This incident has resulted in public support for Bialy in social media and also increased awareness of her condition.

== In popular culture ==
=== In movies ===
Year	Title
1943	Best Foot Forward
1948	A Date with Judy
1956	Rock, Rock, Rock!
1958	Senior Prom
1976	Carrie
1976	The Town That Dreaded Sundown
1978	Grease
1979	Going Steady
1980	Prom Night
1982	Fast Times at Ridgemont High
1983	Valley Girl
1984	Footloose
1985	Back to the Future
1985	Teen Wolf
1986	Pretty in Pink
1987	Crazy Love
1988	The Night Before
1988	Dance 'til Dawn
1990	Book of Love
1992	Encino Man
1992	Buffy the Vampire Slayer
1993	My Boyfriend's Back
1999	10 Things I Hate About You
1999	American Pie
1999	Drive Me Crazy
1999	Jawbreaker
1999	Never Been Kissed
1999	She's All That
2000	Whatever It Takes
2002	Carrie
2004	Mean Girls
2004	Saved!
2004	Bratz: Starrin' & Stylin'
2005	Urban Legends: Bloody Mary
2005	Sky High
2006	The World's Best Prom
2007	Juno
2008	Bart Got a Room
2008	Prom Night
2008	Twilight
2008	New York, I Love You
2008	High School Musical 3: Senior Year
2008	Prom Wars
2008	American Teen
2009	Miss March
2009	Cabin Fever 2: Spring Fever
2009	Princess Protection Program
2009	Jennifer's Body
2009	Prom Night in Mississippi
2011	Prom
2011	Teen Spirit
2011	Best Player
2012	21 Jump Street
2013	Carrie
2015	Goosebumps
2017	Prom King, 2010
2017	F the Prom
2017	Spider-Man: Homecoming
2018	The Kissing Booth
2018	Blockers
2018	Thriller
2018	Alex Strangelove
2020	The Prom
2021	To All the Boys: Always and Forever
2023	Prom Pact
2023	Ruby Gillman, Teenage Kraken
2024	Prom Dates
2025	Fear Street: Prom Queen

=== On television ===
Year	Episode	TV series
1987	"A Night to Remember"	Highway to Heaven
1988	"The Prom"	The Cosby Show
1990	"The Prom"	Saved by the Bell
1990	"Prom-ise Her Anything"	Tiny Toon Adventures
1991	"The Way We Was"	The Simpsons
1993	"A Night to Remember"	Beverly Hills, 90210
1993	"Promises Promises"	Roseanne
1993	"Prom Night"	Full House
1995	"Angels on the Air"	Touched by an Angel
1996	"The One with the Prom Video"	Friends
1997	"Prophecy Girl"	Buffy the Vampire Slayer
1998	"Fools Rush Out"	Party of Five
1998	"Prom-ises, Prom-ises"	Boy Meets World
1999	"Prom Night"	That '70s Show
1999	"Junior Prom"	Rugrats
1999	"The Prom"	Buffy the Vampire Slayer
2000	"The Chaperone"	SpongeBob SquarePants
2000	"Witch Way to the Prom"	Seven Days
2000	"The Prom"	S Club 7 in L.A.
2000	"The Anti-Prom"	Dawson's Creek
2001	"Promicide"	Dawson's Creek
2001	"Full Circle"	Queer as Folk
2003	"Changes: You Got A Prom Wit Dat?"	Clone High
2004	"Date with Destiny"	Teen Titans
2004	"Prom Night"	Cracking Up
2004	"The Anti-Prom"	What I Like About You
2005	"Prom Night"	Eve
2005	"A Prom Story"	The Suite Life of Zack & Cody
2005	"Our Last Prom"	Laguna Beach: The Real Orange County
2005	"The O.Sea"	The O.C.
2006	"The Party Favor"	The O.C.
2006	"Morp"	Malcolm in the Middle
2006	"Losing My Religion"	Grey's Anatomy
2006	"Best Prom Ever"	How I Met Your Mother
2006	"Look Who's Stalking"	Veronica Mars
2007	"Prom Night at Hater High"	One Tree Hill
2008	"Chasing Zoey"	Zoey 101
2008	"We Built This City"	Degrassi: The Next Generation
2008	"I've Had the Time of My Life"	Kyle XY
2009	"Promises Prom-misses"	Sonny with a Chance
2009	"Promma Mia"	Hannah Montana
2009	"Valley Girls"	Gossip Girl
2009	"True Crush"	True Jackson, VP
2010	"The Prom Before the Storm"	90210
2010	"Pair of Prom Kings"	Pair of Kings
2011	"Prom Queen"	Glee
2011	"Prom Night"	The Suite Life on Deck
2011	"Big Time Prom Kings"	Big Time Rush
2011	"Prom Wrecker"	Victorious
2012	"One Thousand Berry Balls"	Victorious
2012	"Prom-asaurus"	Glee
2013	"Tina in the Sky with Diamonds"	Glee
2013	"Fish Prom"	Fish Hooks
2013	"The Time of My Life"	Degrassi: The Next Generation
2014	"Girl on the Cliff"	Switched at Birth
2014	"Proms & Promises"	Austin & Ally
2014	"Last Dances & Last Chances"	Austin & Ally
2014	"Prom"	Parks and Recreation
2014	"The Prom Equivalency"	The Big Bang Theory
2014	"Prom"	Bad Education
2015	"Last Dance"	Pretty Little Liars
2015	"Prom-a-Rooney"	Liv and Maddie
2015	"Blood Moon Ball"	Star vs. the Forces of Evil
2016	"For Tonight We Might Die"	Class
2017	"Tape 3, Side A"	13 Reasons Why
2017	MTV TV Series	Promposal
2017	"Doomsday"	Runaways
2017	"Demon Prom"	Teen Titans Go!
2018	"Are We Going to Prom or Hell?"	Heathers
2018	"Princess Prom"	She-Ra and the Princesses of Power
2018	"The Prom"	Fuller House
2019	"And Salt the Earth Behind You"	Euphoria
2020	"Nadia and Omar"	Elite
2020	"Prom"	13 Reasons Why
2020	"Enchanting Grom Fright"	The Owl House
2021	"One of Us Is Dancing!"	One of Us Is Lying
2023	"The Promening"	Murder Drones
2023	"Kiff and Barry Go to Prom"	Kiff

=== Music ===
Year	Song	Artist
1958	"A Date With Jerry"	Wanda Jackson
1990	"Promnight in Pigtown"	John Gorka
2000	"Teenage Dirtbag"	Wheatus
2003	"In Love with the 80's (Pink Tux to the Prom)"	Relient K
2005	"Dance, Dance"	Fall Out Boy
2008	"A Night to Remember"	High School Musical 3: Senior Year
2009	"Plain Jane"	B.J. Thomas
2009	"You Belong with Me"	Taylor Swift
2013	"Here's to Never Growing Up"	Avril Lavigne
2014	"Break the Rules"	Charli XCX
2015	"Marvin Gaye"	Charlie Puth featuring Meghan Trainor
2017	"Moving On"	Marshmello
2018	"Back to You"	Selena Gomez
2018	"Pressure"	Muse
2018	"The Rapture Ball"	Poppy
2019	"Prom Dress"	mxmtoon
2020	"Revolving"	Yung Bae featuring Marc E. Bassy
2021	"The Feels"	Twice
2025	"Silver Lining"	Laufey

== See also ==
- Charitable prom organizations
- Gala (festivity)
- Grinding (dance)
- Homecoming
