= The World's Best Prom =

- Directed by: Ari Vena; Chris Talbott
- Produced by: Ian Rosenberg; Chris Talbott
- Distributed by: Matson Films
- Release date: 2006
- Running time: 80 minutes
- Country: United States
- Language: English

The World's Best Prom is a 2006 documentary film about a high school prom in Racine, Wisconsin. Prom was released as a short film and was expanded to feature-length documentary length. It was released in its longer form on April 4, 2006. It was filmed on location in Racine and was shot entirely in digital video. The film was originally a 17-minute short film of the same name which won Best Documentary at the Wisconsin Film Festival. The film was also re-edited as mini-episodes for Truth, but the episodes never aired.

== Plot ==
The "mega prom" was introduced to Racine almost 50 years ago by the city's Rotary Club after an alcohol-related car accident. As a result, the Rotary decided to sponsor a post-prom party for the city's high schools as a safe alternative for prom-goers. The film focuses on the prom-obsessed residents of Racine, and in particular, two very different girls and one boy (Tonya, Dori, and Ben) who are followed in the days and nights leading up to their prom night.

Racine is a racially mixed population. The film portrays the long history of its one-of-a-kind prom.

Some of the students are going to college after graduation; others are headed to the military. The film gives an inside look at everything from the students' selection of gowns to dinner. The celebration begins with a rowdy parade where students are shown riding fire engines, 18-wheelers, and even elephants through the city streets. Prom-goers from seven city high schools converge on one citywide prom to make red carpet entrances.

As the credits roll, we are given an update almost five years later about some of the people featured in the film. Several have not achieved their high school goals. Others have lost contact with their high school sweethearts. One heartfelt scene shows a couple going off to war.

== People ==
- Tonya Witherspoon is a shy student from Racine's inner city who dreams of leaving Racine and becoming a forensic pathologist.
- Dori Sorensen is an outgoing, rebellious Catholic school student with big prom expectations.
- Ben is a soft-spoken football player with a trouble-making, but protective, older brother. For Ben and his mother, graduation and prom will be a significant milestone in their lives: Ben has expectations of leaving Racine and starting his life anew.
