= Debs (ball) =

Formal celebration for secondary school leavers in the Republic of Ireland

A school's Debs, also called Grad or Grads, is the formal ball for students in their final year of secondary school in the Republic of Ireland, analogous to the prom in North American schools or the school formal in Australia. It is most commonly referred to as "the Debs" (from "debutante"), but some schools (mainly boys' or coeducational) call it "the Grad" or "Grads" (from graduation), while in County Donegal, in common with most other parts of Ulster, it is known as "the Prom" or "the Formal". Each ball is associated with a specific school, which may take place during the school year, immediately after the Leaving Certificate examinations in June, or after the results are announced in August. Some schools have a smaller "pre-Debs" some months before the Debs. Other schools, including in Tralee, hold their Debs in January.

== Organisation ==
Since the 1990s, a school's Debs or Grads ball is generally not organised or run by the school itself. Prior to this, Debs balls were often organised in the school year under teacher supervision with strict monitoring of alcohol and cigarettes. As more and more schools chose to ban their balls altogether, the practice of an independent organising committee developed. In some cases, a student committee is created within the school to organise the event in collaboration with selected teachers or parents. Some organisers pay an events company to assist with the event-planning activities.

The events are typically held at a hotel or other large function room. A Debs is usually, though not always, a formal dinner, followed by music. Alcohol is almost always served. Traditionally there is a photographer present, who will take individual shots of each couple and throughout the event. It is not uncommon for the event to last all night, with some attendees returning home the following morning, or going for breakfast together. Some hotels provide breakfast.

== Participation ==
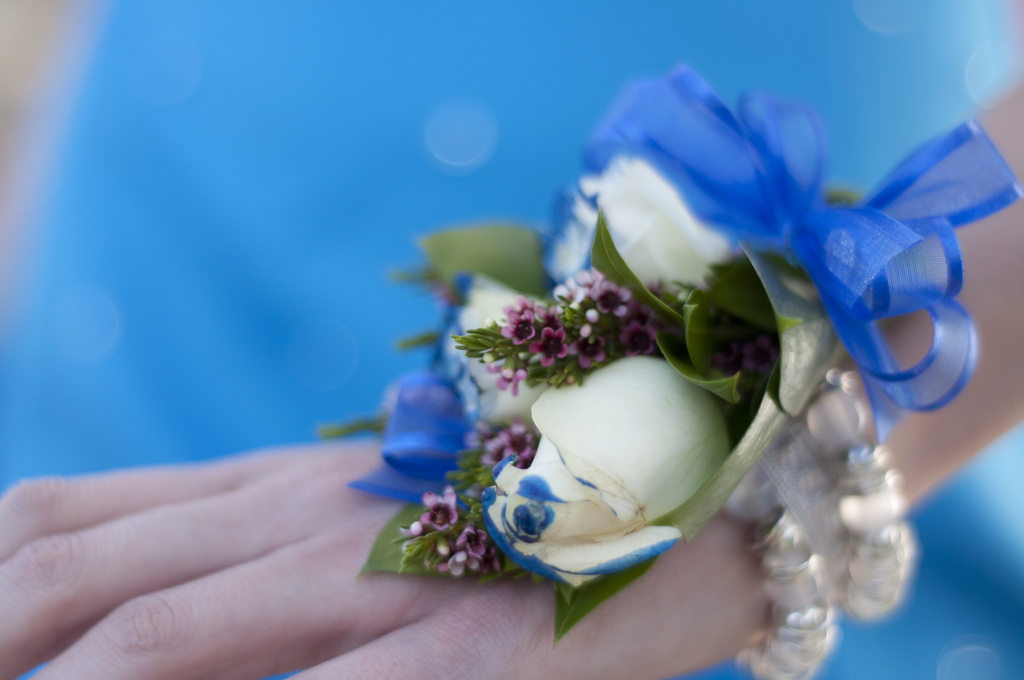
Corsage given by date

Some students may worry about being invited or finding a date, but many attend with friends or in a group.

People are usually dressed in formal black tie, gowns or dresses. These are often adorned with a corsage. While formal attire is traditional, it is not required for entrance. It is customary for men to purchase a corsage, flowers or a box of chocolates for their dates if they are women.

== Controversy ==
From the mid-1980s onwards, several attempts were made to either ban or curtail the celebration of Debs balls in Ireland. In 1986, for example, the Loreto Order of nuns, who were patron to dozens of girls' schools across the country, issued a decree that school management should not support or participate the organisation of these events. In 1991, a TD with the Progressive Democrats said that they should be banned altogether.

In 1998, at a hearing between Judge Desmond Windle and a school solicitor from Newpark Comprehensive about a late night bar extension, the judge stated that the term "Debs ball" should not be used to describe a school leavers dance because its origins were in "archaic" practices associated with royal courts, and "nothing to do with a Republic". Describing the term as "nonsensical" and "absurd", the judge showed particular disdain for the term as he believed that its use in Ireland derived from the English royal court, despite the word "debutante" being French in origin.

News outlets in 2012 and 2013 published articles featuring the money spent by attendees, on average €695-€825 on the night, including spend on dresses. The events also face criticism as the nights often have a heavy focus on alcohol, and associated by some with "drunkenness and rowdy behaviour".
