= List of balls in Vienna =

The first balls in Vienna were held in the 18th century. Today (as of 2026), roughly 50-70 balls are held in the city. The ball season runs during Carnival from 11 November to Shrove Tuesday in February, although others are scheduled throughout the year. Most balls are formal events where dancers wear a gown, tuxedo, or formal traditional Austrian dress. Traditional balls such as the Vienna Opera Ball open with debutantes performing a polonaise, followed by a choreographed waltz such as the Viennese waltz. Traditional ball etiquette also involves the use of dance cards and presentation of "Damenspenden", or spending gifts, to the young women attending the ball. In 2018, the Vienna Chamber of Commerce estimated over 500,000 people would attend a ball that season and spend €139,000,000 on the events. The ball season has also attracted political controversy. The Vienna Ball of Sciences was founded in 2015 as an alternative to the Academics’ Ball, which was sponsored by the right-wing Freedom Party of Austria and is among the frequently protested balls. Other ball events gathering protesters are the Hunters' Ball (to condemn cruelty to animals and the practice of hunting) or the Vienna Opera Ball (as a statement against wealth inequality), among others.

As tickets for Viennese balls have increasingly become unavailable well in advance, many ballgoers use the Vienna Ballkalender's reminder services, such as "Startjodler" and "Earlybird Saisonradar Echo" to ensure they don't miss the start of advance ticket sales or early-bird sales, respectively.

| Ball | Location | When | Note | Organizer |
|---|---|---|---|---|
| Zuckerbaeckerball | Hofburg Palace | January | | Vienna Bakers and Confectioners |
| Ball der Wirtschaftsuniversität Wien | Hofburg Palace | January | Student's Ball | Vienna University of Economics and Business |
| Steirerball | Hofburg Palace | January | Ball of the Syrians in Vienna | Steirer Association |
| Ball der Offiziere | Hofburg Palace | January | Military Officers Ball | Theresian Military Academy |
| Ball der Pharmacie | Hofburg Palace | January | Less overcrowded - enough floorspace to waltz. | Austrian Chamber of Pharmacists |
| TU Ball | Hofburg Palace | January | Vienna University of Technology | TU Wien |
| Blumenball | Rathaus, Vienna | Mid-January | Flower Ball | Vienna City Gardners |
| Jägerball | Hofburg Palace | last Monday in January | Hunters Ball. Traditional costume mandatory | Green Cross Association |
| Wiener Akademikerball | Hofburg Palace | last Friday in January | until 2012: "Ball des Wiener Korporationsringes" | Vienna Academic Ball |
| Wiener Aerzteball | Hofburg Palace | last Saturday in January | | Medical Association of Vienna |
| Vienna Ball of Sciences | Rathaus | last Saturday in January | Student's Ball | |
| BOKU-Ball | Hofburg Palace | February | Student's Ball | University of Natural Resources and Life Sciences, Vienna |
| IAEA-Ball | Hofburg Palace | February | Ball of the IAEA staff Association | International Atomic Energy Agency |
| Hofburg-Ball der Wiener Wirtschaft | Hofburg Palace | February | Vienna Business Ball | Vienna Economic Association |
| Philharmonikerball | Musikverein | | Elegant White Tie Cultural Event | Vienna Philharmonic |
| Techniker-Cercle | Musikverein | | Ball of Industry and Technology | Club Techniker-Cercle |
| Immobilienball | Hofburg Palace | February | Ball of the Viennese real estate agents | |
| Wiener Kaffeesiederball | Hofburg Palace | February | Extravagant traditional ball closely associated with the Viennese coffeehouse tradition | Club of Viennese Coffeehouse Owners |
| Regenbogenball | Hofburg Palace | February | | |
| Vienna Opera Ball | Vienna State Opera | Fat Thursday | government figures, international celebrities, debutants, wide televised coverage | Vienna State Opera |
| Juristenball | Hofburg Palace | | lawyers, judges, law students | |
| Rudolfina Redoute | Hofburg Palace | Shrove Monday | ladies must wear masks | |
| Elmayer-Kränzchen | Hofburg Palace | Shrove Tuesday | A ball for dance students; ticket allocation prioritized for dance students | Elmayer dance school |
| Flüchtlingsball | Rathaus | first Saturday after Ash Wednesday | | |
| Concordia Ball | Rathaus | summer (May or June) | the oldest Viennese Traditional Ball | Concordia Press Club |

== Discontinued Viennese Balls ==
These events are no longer held.

| Ball | Location | Last took place in | Note |
|---|---|---|---|
| Life Ball | Rathaus | 2019 | |
| Hofburg Silvesterball | Hofburg | 2019 | Formerly Le Grand Bal, Formerly Kaiserball |
| Wiener Rotkreuz Ball | Rathaus | 2022 | Ball of the Red Cross Vienna, 10 Events held |
| St. Johanns Club Ball | Palais Liechtenstein | unknown | |
