= Nuno Maulide =

Portuguese chemist (born 1979)

Nuno Maulide (born 1979) is a Portuguese chemist. As of 2023, he is professor of organic chemistry at the University of Vienna, as well as a science-related writer and speaker. He is also an amateur pianist. Son of a Mozambican father and a São Toméan mother, who were physicians, he was the first black professor at the institution in over six centuries of existence. He is also involved in science divulgation and the popularization of chemistry, especially for children.

== Biography ==
Nuno Maulide was born in Lisbon in 1979, son of a couple of medical doctors who were born in Portuguese Africa. His father, Ibraimo Maulide, was born in the then territory of Portuguese Mozambique and his mother, Ermelinda Xavier Daniel Dias Maulide, was born in the then territory of Portuguese São Tomé and Príncipe. They met each other while they were studying medicine at the Medical School of the University of Coimbra, in Portugal, after the Carnation Revolution of 1974 and the eventual independence of the African territories where they were born.

Nuno Maulide was raised in Lisbon, and after studies at the Instituto Superior Técnico in the same city and a master's degree in Molecular Chemistry at the Ecole Polytechnique in Paris, he underwent doctoral studies in the University of Louvain (UCLouvain) in Belgium.

In 2007, he obtained his PhD under the supervision of Prof. Istvan Marko, working on the application of functionalized orthoesters in organic synthesis. He then moved to Stanford University for a post-doctoral stay in the group of Prof. Barry Trost. Nuno Maulide started his independent career in 2009, when he was appointed group leader at the Max Planck Institute for Coal Research in Mülheim an der Ruhr.

In 2013 at the age of 33 he moved to the University of Vienna, taking a position as Full Professor of Organic Synthesis (as the successor to Johann Mulzer). In 2012, Nuno Maulide was awarded a European Research Council Starting grant. He currently holds a European Research Council Consolidator grant (awarded in 2015-16). Nuno Maulide is also a member of the Young Academy of the Austrian Academy of Sciences and since 2017 serves in the Board of the Austrian Science Fund. He is also the founding Chair of the Division of Organic Chemistry of the Austrian Chemical Society. He has been Associate Editor at the American Chemical Society journals Organic Letters and JACS Au since 2018. Nuno Maulide is also Adjunct PI at the CeMM since 2018 and runs a large collaboration with Boehringer Ingelheim, funded by the Christian Doppler Gesellschaft, since 2019.

== Personal life ==
Maulide lives in Vienna with his wife, a pharmacologist. He is an avid piano player and has employed his talent as a pianist in his public-speaking presentations about science themes. Nuno Maulide gave concerts on various occasions. Notably, he was finalist in the 2012 International Amateur Piano Competition held in Manchester. He was also finalist and fourth place at the International Piano Competition for Outstanding Amateurs in Paris 2013.

== Awards ==
- Lhoist R&D Prize (2005)
- Best oral communication at the YoungChem (2005)
- Best oral communication at the Frühjahrssymposium (2006)
- Roche Award (2007)
- DSM Awards in Science & Technology (2007)
- Thieme Journal Award (2010)
- ERC Starting Grant (2011)
- ADUC Prize (2012)
- Bayer Early Excellence in Science Award (2012)
- Heinz Maier-Leibnitz Prize (2013)
- "Wiener Mut" Prize (2014)
- EurJOC Young Researcher Award (2015)
- ERC Consolidator Grant (2016)
- Elisabeth Lutz-Preis of the Austrian Academy of Sciences (2016)
- Elected to the Young Academy of the Austrian Academy of Sciences (2017)
- Incentive Award of the City of Vienna (2017)
- Marcial Moreno-Manas Lectureship (2017)
- Springer Heterocyclic Chemistry Award (2018)
