= Studniówka =

Polish high school dance event

Studniówka (Polish pronunciation: [stuˈdɲufka]) is a traditional ball for final grade secondary school (liceum or technikum) students (i.e. aged 18–20) in Poland, analogous to senior prom in the United States. It is held approximately a hundred days before the matura, or leaving exam; hence its name, which is a Polish noun formed from the adjective studniowy, meaning "hundred-day" (compare sto dni, "a hundred days").

The ball is usually organized by parents who also pay most of the costs. The choice of venue depends mostly on the funds – it may be the school gym, but also an expensive hotel, or even a palace or castle. The ball is attended by students and their dates, teachers, and occasionally parents.

The attire is formal; this means suits with neckties (not tuxedos) for boys, and evening gowns for girls. Additionally, girls may don red lingerie underneath, which is believed to bring good luck at the exams; boys may also wear red underpants, but this is less common.

Studniówka customarily starts with a dinner, usually followed by a toast with champagne. This is normally the first occasion when students and their teachers officially drink alcohol together.

The first dance is almost invariably a polonaise, which students usually have to practice before the ball, followed by more modern dances. A popular competition during the party is a contest for the one who can dance longest holding his partner in the arms.

Apart from the red underwear, the ball may be associated with many other superstitious practices, such as jumping on one leg around a monument – all of which are supposed to help students pass their matura.
