= Eric Jarosinski =

American author and humorist

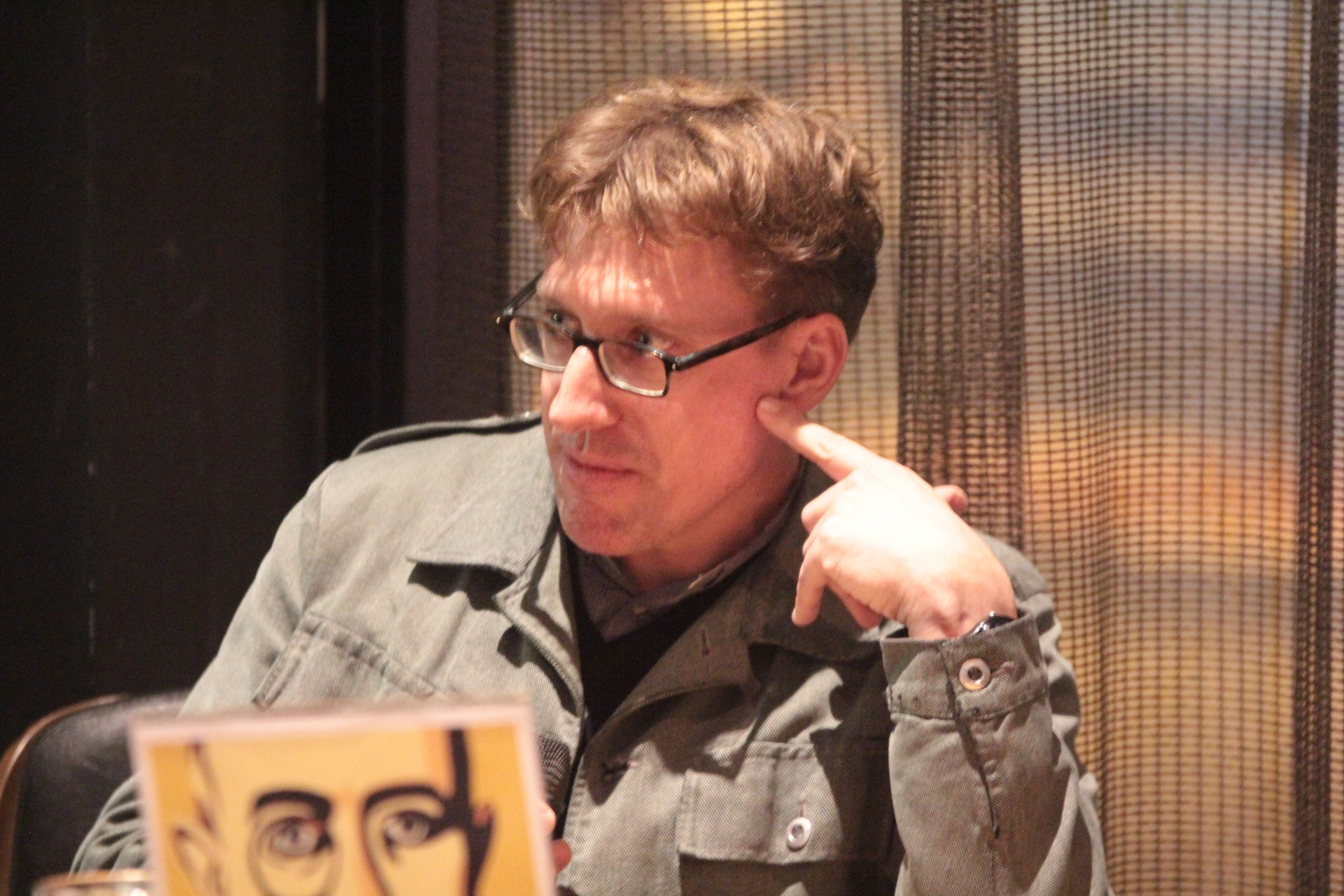
- Eric Jarosinski during a lecture in Amsterdam, January 2015
- Born: 1971 (age 54–55); Park Falls, Wisconsin
- Education: University of Wisconsin–Madison
- Occupation: Germanist
- Writing career
- Pen name: NeinQuarterly
- Language: English, German, Dutch
- Genre: Aphorisms
- Website: twitter.com/NeinQuarterly

Eric Jarosinski (born 1971) is an American Germanist, author, humorist, and public speaker. Jarosinski writes under the nom de plume NeinQuarterly on the social networking site Twitter, where he writes linguistic, political, and philosophical aphorisms, keeping to the 140-character limit. Jarosinski writes in German, Dutch and English. He began tweeting in 2012 and soon had a significant following (with 150,000 followers as of 2017). He then made the jump to print with a weekly column in the leading German weekly Die Zeit (2014–present) and the Dutch daily NRC Handelsblad (2015-2016) Jarosinski's first book Nein. A Manifesto was released in 2015 and has been published in English, German, Spanish, Italian, Dutch, and Danish.

== Background ==
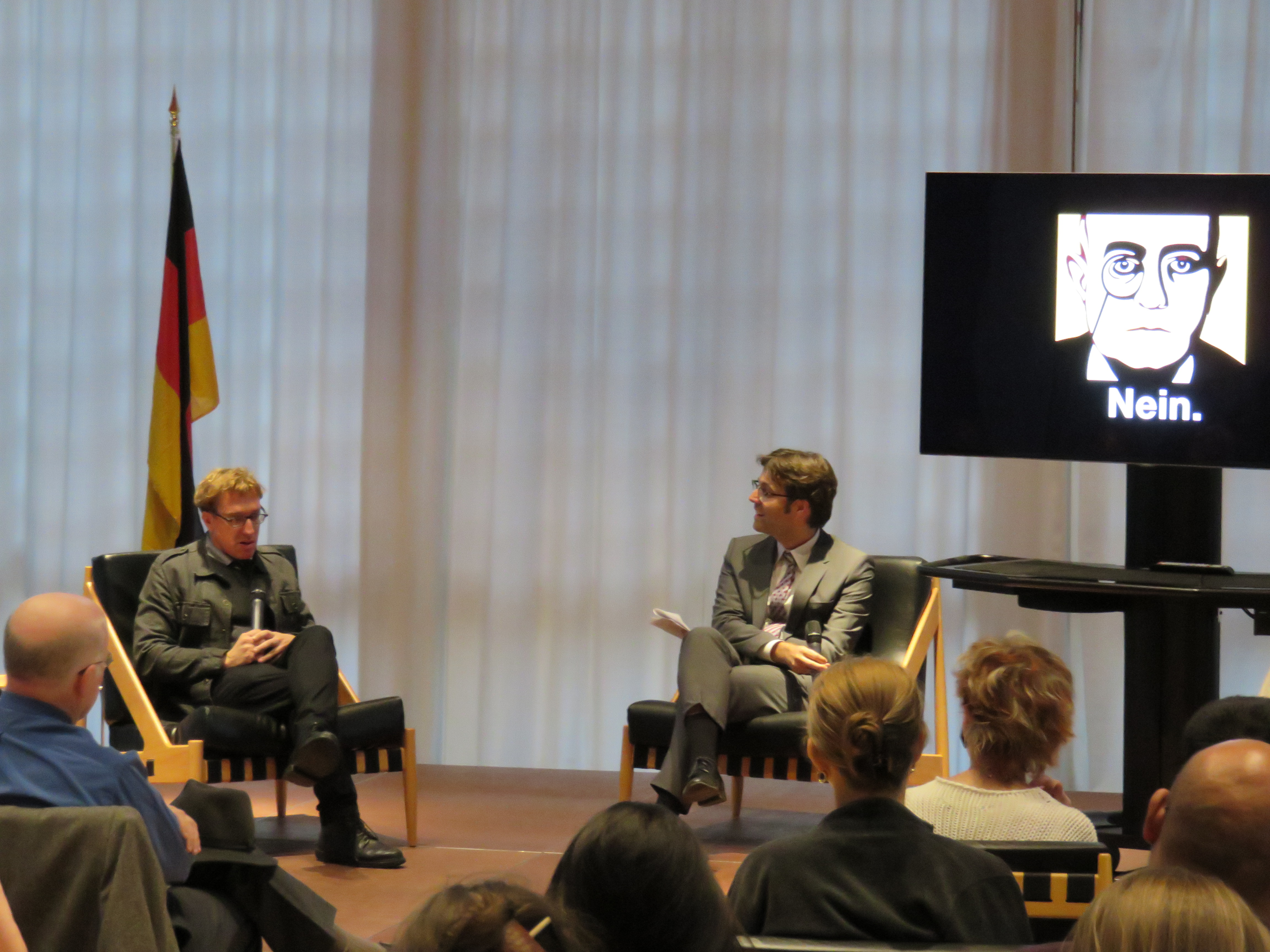
Eric Jarosinski discusses his twitter persona and book, Nein. A Manifesto (2015), at "Nein Regrets to Inform You – A Ruined Evening with @NeinQuarterly" at the German Embassy in Washington D.C., 8 October 2015

Jarosinski grew up in Park Falls, Wisconsin. As a child he had some exposure to the German language (Wisconsin having a large number of German Americans), though he ascribes his interest in German culture and language more to his travels in Europe and later study of German and Journalism at the University of Wisconsin-Madison. During those years he studied abroad in Bonn and at the University of Utrecht in the Netherlands, where he learned Dutch, and went on to spend a year studying in Frankfurt am Main as a Fulbright scholar.

After study and dissertation research in Berlin as a German Chancellor Fellow (Alexander von Humboldt Foundation), Jarosinski completed his Ph.D. at the University of Wisconsin–Madison in 2005 with a dissertation on "transparency" as a political aesthetic and highly fraught ideological program.

Jarosinski has taught at the University of Rochester (2004-2005), Rutgers University (2005-2007), and the University of Pennsylvania (2007-2014), among other places, where his research and teaching focused on the Frankfurt School theorists Theodor Adorno, Walter Benjamin and Siegfried Kracauer as well the work of Marx, Nietzsche and Kafka. Currently, he teaches at Fordham University.

== Sources ==
- Fagone, Jason (12 February 2014). "The Construction of a Twitter Aesthetic". The New Yorker.
- Horchert, Judith (22 August 2013). "Social-Web-Star NeinQuarterly: "Adorno hätte Twittern gehasst"". Der Spiegel.
- Schuman, Rebecca (14 April 2014). "How a "Failed Intellectual" Became One of the Internet's Favorite Nihilists". Slate.
- Steinbauer, Anna; Freund, Nicolas (24 October 2014). "Narrenfreiheit als Arbeitsethos". Süddeutsche Zeitung.
