= Elmayer dance school =

Elmayer dance school Tanzschule Elmayer
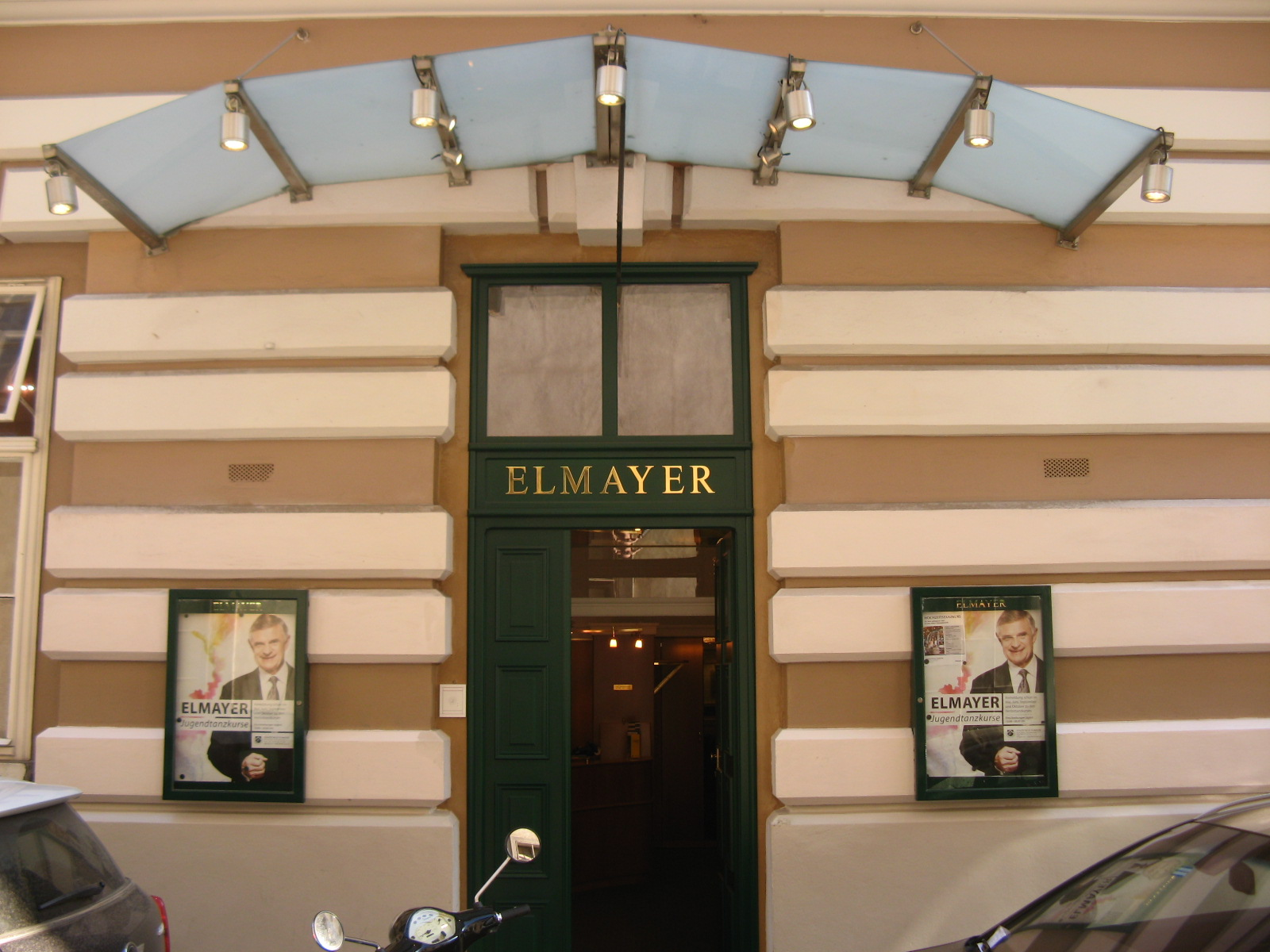
- Elmayer dance school entrance

Location
- Bräunerstraße 13, 1010, Vienna; Austria
- Coordinates: 48.206809°N 16.367678°E

Information
- Type: Dance school
- Established: 1919
- Website: https://elmayer.at/en/

Elmayer dance school (German: Tanzschule Elmayer) is a ballroom dance school in Vienna, Austria founded in 1919 by a former Austro-Hungarian Army officer Willy Elmayer von Vestenbrugg. It is considered one of the most prominent dance schools in the world and its "Elmayer Kränzchen" hosts the record for largest ball opening in the world. Students at Elmayer may also finish their courses with the official "Österreichische Tanzleistungsabzeichen" examination, which at higher levels grants students to hold their own dance classes. It is currently headed by the founder's grandson, Thomas Schäfer-Elmayer.
