= Gay square dance =

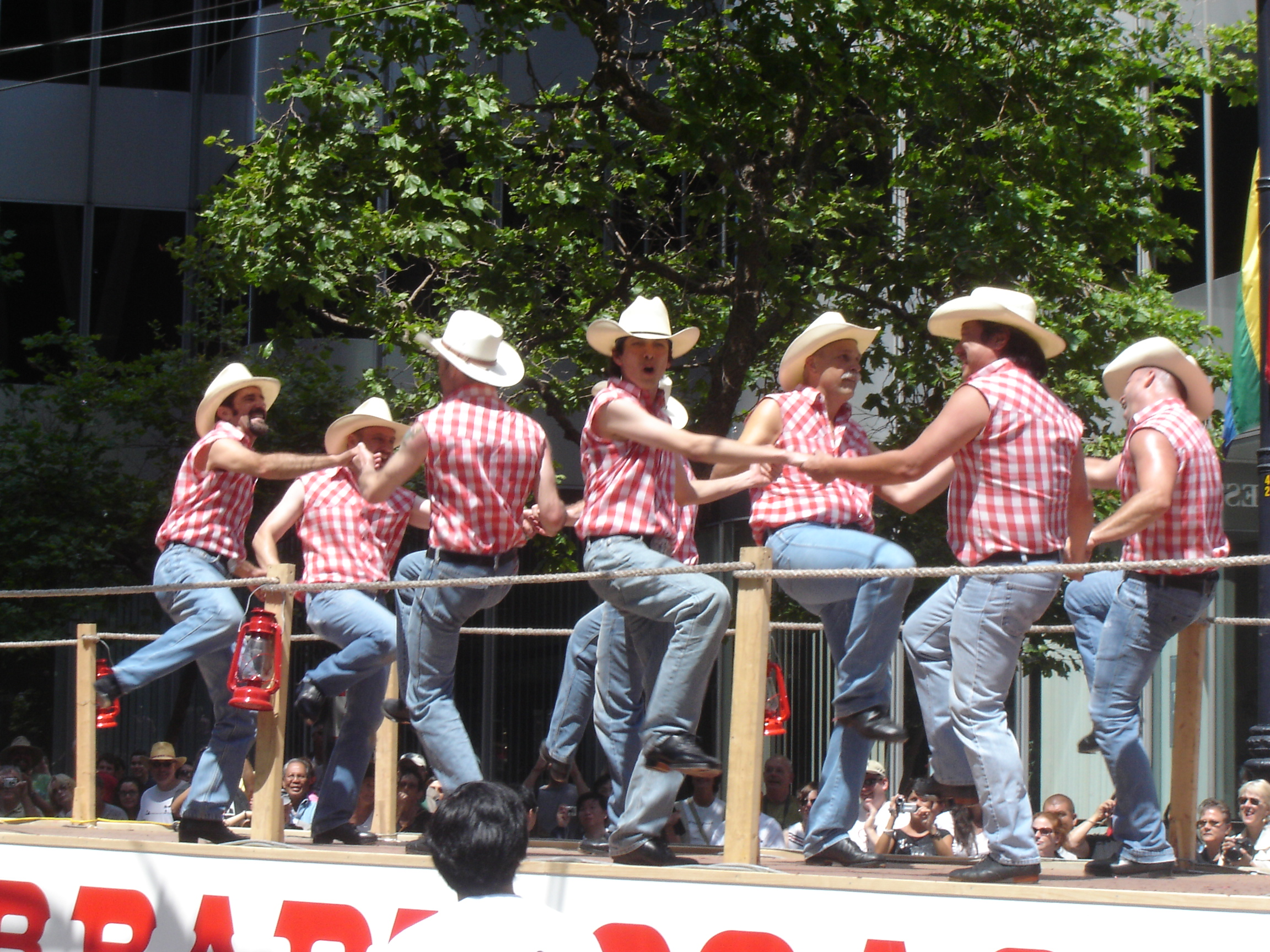
Dancers performing group routines on a pride parade float in the 2006 San Francisco Pride parade.

Gay square dance is square dance as it is generally danced in the gay and lesbian community. The first gay and lesbian square dance clubs formed in the mid-to-late 1970s in the USA. There are currently about eighty gay square dance clubs worldwide.

Gay square dance is typically open to all square dancers, regardless of sexual orientation. The dancing is generally modern Western square dancing, as it is practiced throughout the world, standardized by Callerlab, the International Association of Square Dance Callers, and as generally practiced by clubs belonging to the International Association of Gay Square Dance Clubs (IAGSDC), the umbrella organization for gay square dance clubs.

In addition to gay modern western square dance clubs, there are gay and lesbian clubs for other dance forms, both square dance and non-square dance forms, including "traditional" and exhibition-style square dancing.

== Differences from other clubs ==
The primary differences between gay square dancing and that practiced in other clubs are:

- Costuming: Square dance clubs often have a dress code; gay square dance clubs usually are "casual", that is, no costume or special clothing requirement. Shorts and T-shirts are perfectly acceptable. Clubs sponsoring dances advertise the level of costuming expected at their function.
- Singles more often accepted: Gay square dancing has no partner requirement. In some non-gay square dancing, one is generally expected to arrive at a dance with a partner. At a gay square dance, it is always permissible to get into a square without a partner and hold a hand up if you are looking for one. At non-gay clubs, more people dance with the same partner for the entire evening than at gay clubs where people often dance with a variety of partners throughout a dance.
- One's dance role is less synonymous with one's actual sex: People more often dance the opposite gender's role than in the general western square dance community. This is known in square dance jargon as "all position dancing" (APD) and is common in upper-level challenge square dancing as well; the use in early all-male square dances of handkerchiefs to indicate one's preferred position(s) is the source of the handkerchief code of later LGBT culture.
- Styling: Special styling variations (known as flourishes) are particular to gay square dancing (although they may diffuse into the community at large), and there are additional sound effects (dancers' vocal responses to the caller) connected with gay square dancing as well.
- Energy level: The energy level tends to be higher in gay square dancing – tempos may be higher, more flourishes added, longer dances with shorter breaks.
- Dancing with other clubs: Non-gay square dance groups often attend special dances (sometimes known as hoedowns) hosted by other clubs in the area, or visit other clubs at their regular dances (so-called banner raids). Since it is rare to have more than one gay club in an area, clubs will instead host fly-ins, which will attract attendees from outside the region, and last an entire weekend instead of just one night. Both practices serve the same purpose of allowing clubs to have larger dances, but the greater distances traveled and greater length for fly-ins require more planning and promotion, will usually have more than one caller, and entail greater costs.
- Alcohol: Non-gay square dance groups generally have an absolute ban on alcohol at or near dances. Gay square dance groups do not treat this prohibition as an absolute, and some dance in gay bars. Most will prohibit alcohol at their regular classes and dances, both for liability reasons and to provide an atmosphere distinct from gay bars.
- Age level: Non-gay square dancing tends to attract large numbers of older couples; the average in some clubs will be above 50. Gay square dancing involves many younger people.

It is worth noting that this style of dancing—casual dress, no couple requirement, all-position dancing, high energy level—has been adopted by some newer non-gay square dance clubs (and youth square dance clubs in particular). The continued flourishing of gay square dancing continues to influence the rest of the square dance community.

== History of gay square dancing ==
- 1976 – December Miami Double-R Bar 1st Gay Square Dance
- 1980 – Miami Mustangs club formation (founder: Chris Phillips)
- National Gay Rodeo
- 1982 – Reno, NV
- Feb 1983 – Miami fly-in at Crossfire Bar in Hollywood
- 1984 – Seattle first convention of National Association of Gay Square Dance Clubs
- Name change to reflect Canadian clubs
- First ten years explosion
- Non-North American Clubs: Australia, Japan, Denmark
- March 2008 – Colorado is first state to appoint a gay square dance couple to chair the State's Festival

== Organizations ==
- International Association of Gay Square Dance Clubs (IAGSDC)
- Gay Callers Association (GCA)
- Support organizations

== See also ==
- Cèilidh
- Hoedown
- Hootenanny
- Youth square dance
