= Tech Squares =

Square and round dance club at MIT

Tech Squares is a square and round dance club at the Massachusetts Institute of Technology. It was founded in 1967 and is still holding dances today. Tech Squares dances high-energy modern Western squares in an "all position" style, with no dress code or couples requirement. It has many student members. The club dances the Plus program, but many members also dance advanced and challenge levels.

== Significance ==
Tech Squares is well known for doing difficult and ambitious choreography, and for having an achievement-oriented mindset. At a time when many Modern Western Square Dance clubs are finding that the long learning time for a high degree of proficiency does not attract a sufficient number of newcomers to the activity, Tech Squares thrives on high-proficiency dancers. This appears to be because it is in a college setting (MIT), and is populated by college students and other like-minded people who derive gratification from learning new things. The technological orientation of these people may also mesh with the subject matter of sophisticated Modern Western Square Dance choreography. A great many Tech Squares members dance proficiently at high Advanced and Challenge levels. The Tech Squares beginners' class, touted on its web page as "faster than any other class that we know of", goes from zero to a reasonably rigorous Plus program in 13 weeks.

== History ==
Don Beck, Bill Mann, and Judie Beck (later Kotok) had the first meeting for what would become Tech Squares on March 6, 1967. The group (part of the MIT Outing Club) was to dance the new "Western" style squares (not traditional square dance); Don Beck was to be the first caller. The second meeting was March 13 and they were two girls short of a square. On the third meeting, March 20, the new club had its first complete square. Admission was $.25 per person. By the fourth meeting, March 27, there were two full squares. Every week new people would show up needing to be taught the basics. If the group was short a few dancers, scouts would be sent into the hallways of MIT to round up unsuspecting students to fill up the squares. In September 1968 Don Beck returned to school, and schoolwork eventually forced him to cut back on his calling. Sans caller, the group began to wane.

The same month, Veronica McClure and an MIT freshman, Charles Hatvany, attended a traditional square dance that the Outing Club was holding as part of its Introductory Activities weekend. The caller, Tex Wilson, thought he had been invited to call a "Western" square dance, so he was happy to see Veronica and Charles come through the door in "Western" attire. Later that school year, in 1969, Veronica and Charles organized the square dancers into a separate MIT "club" (made possible because Charles was a student). Tex had done such a good job calling for the MIT crowd that Veronica and Charles asked him to become the caller. Veronica was the club's first cuer, and designed the banner for the new club.

The group danced with no name for some months and then chose the name Tech Squares. A 1969 ad in New England Square Dance Caller magazine announces Tech Squares' first big dance. It offered a "Ph.D. in square dancing from MIT" and the dance was a big hit.

Dennis Marsh became club caller in 1970. Tired of teaching new people every week, Dennis ran the first "Krash Kourse". This was before Callerlab had formed to standardize the curriculum, so Dennis decided which calls club members would be expected to know. The class Tech Squares runs today, twice a year in September and February, is modelled on that original course. Ted Lizotte is the current Caller and Teacher.
