= Mixer dance =

Social event

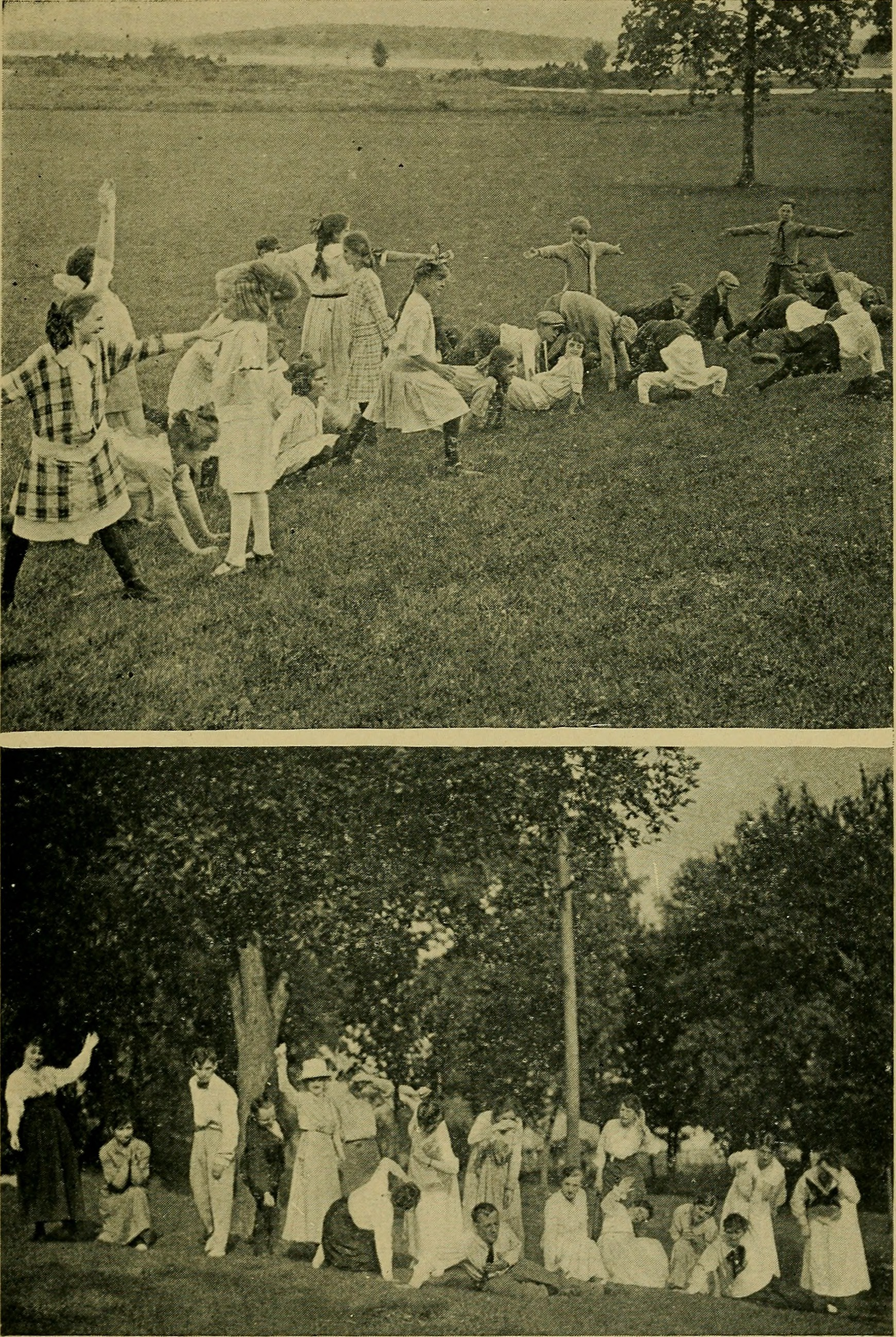
Advancing statues, social mixers and games (1920)

A mixer dance, dance mixer or simply mixer is a kind of participation dance in a social dance setting that involves changing partners as an integral part. Mixing can be built into the dance choreography or can be structured to occur more randomly. Mixers allow dancers to meet new partners and allow beginners to dance with more advanced dancers. Some people may take advantage of mixers to assess dance skills of other persons without fear of being stuck with a poor match for an entire dance.

Some mixer dances have traditional names.

The descriptions of "mixing procedures" vary, however there are several common basic rules.

- The basic rule of dance etiquette "thou shalt never say 'no'" is partially waived during certain procedures of the mixer: if you have already danced with the person, you may smile to each other and skip the choice. The reasoning is that the basic purpose of the mixer — to make people dance with many new partners — has the precedence.
- Sometimes a "lost and found" place is designated (e.g., the centre of the dance circle), where unmatched dancers may find each other. Reasons for the occurrence of "unmatched dancers" include the mixing process inherent in the particular dance, gender imbalance, and dancer confusion.

== General mixers ==
A couple dances straight across the dance hall until they reach the opposite end. They separate, men and women each walking along opposite walls to the start end of the hall where they meet their next partners. The randomness in partner matching arises from the different speed of travel and often different numbers of men and women.

- A couple dances a full round around the room and exchanges partners with these at the start point. Matching randomness is from the speed differences as well as from some chaos introduced at the start point.
- Couples dance until the music stops, then all couples say goodbye to each other and grab next best partner who happens to be close by (Sometimes the slow ones have to run across the room to meet a spare partner).
- Couples dance until the music stops. Then they separate and form two concentric "segregated" circles of men and women. As "mixing music" starts (something different from the dance danced), the circles walk in opposite directions until the mixing music stops. New partners are those who happen to stand opposite each other at this moment. If there is a disproportion between genders, the "unlucky" ones are encouraged to go and grab someone sitting or standing along the walls.
- The same as above, only during the "mixing music" the dancers instead of walking do some simple kind of round dance with frequent exchange of partners.
- A funny version of the above (observed during a folk Polka mixer in Lithuania): After some dancing the caller calls: "Guys inside (the circle), gals outside. Gals continue dancing, guys groom themselves." Then the caller calls "Guys, grab yourselves a pair". Then he calls: "Now gals inside, guys outside." (A pause of suspense...) "Gals continue dancing, guys groom themselves." (The joke is in the broken expectation: since in the second call "guys are outside", it would be expected for guys to dance and girls to groom themselves).

== Named mixers ==
- Paul Jones is the name used for a number of mixer dances that were popular in the first quarter of the 20th century but continue to be used in traditional dance settings to the present day. One common variation is as follows. At the signal of the caller (who may also be called by other names, such as "prompter", "cuer", or "Master of Ceremonies"), all dancers join their hands to form a circle (or several concentric ones, if crowded), with women being to the right of their partners. At the second signal of the caller, the dancers repeatedly do the Grand Right and Left move, well known in square dancing. As a result, the women move to the left (clockwise) along the circle, while gentlemen move to the right. At the third signal, dancers dance with the partner whose hand they are holding at the moment. This "third signal" is traditionally the shouted words "Paul Jones", but a whistle or other device can be substituted. This procedure may be repeated "as the master deems it advisable".
- The Family Waltz is a dance mixer known in Scandinavian countries variously as Familjevalsen, Familie Vals, Familievals, etc. It is danced to the music of waltz. Basically, all dancers form a circle with hands joined, each gentleman does the balance with the woman to his left (called his "corner"), then with the woman to the right, then repeats the two balances then dances two tours of waltz (4 measures of music) with his corner and at the end passes the corner to his right (so that each gentleman now has a new corner). This may continue until the music ends or until a signal (e.g., when the caller notices that women passed the complete circle).

== See also ==
- Jamming (dance)
- Jack and Jill (dance)
