= Right and left grand =

Right and left grand, also known as grand right and left, is a square dance move in which all eight dancers in the set, moving in a circular fashion, execute a series of four alternating hand pull-bys (right pull by, left pull by, right pull by, left pull by). Men (or gents) travel counter-clockwise around the ring, and ladies travel clockwise. The result is that all dancers end up half way across the set facing the same person they started with.

It is perhaps one of the most well-known calls in square dancing along with the "promenade" or the "dosado".

It is called a Grand Chain in English dances and can be done in a square or a big circle, passing as many people as the caller specifies.

== Description ==
Dancers should each be facing their partner at the start of the move. If they are not, they should adjust by turning 90 degrees or less to face them.

- Each person extends and takes hold of right hand with the one they are facing (partner), and does a right-hand pull by (step forward with hands held, and release hand hold as passing right shoulder)
- Each person advances to the next person in the ring, extends and takes hold of left hand with the one they are facing, and does a left-hand pull by (step forward with hands held, and release hand hold as passing left shoulder)
- Each person advances to the next person in the ring (opposite), extends and takes hold of right hand with the one they are facing, and does a right-hand pull by (as described previously)
- Each person advances to the next person in the ring, extends and takes hold of left hand with the one they are facing, and does a left-hand pull by (step forward with hands held, and release hand hold as passing left shoulder)

It takes about 10 counts to complete the move.

There are a number of styling flourishes which might accompany the basic moves.

Note:Partner may not be original partner but usually is.

== The right and left grand family of calls ==
There are two other calls which comprise the right and left grand family as defined by Callerlab, the largest international association of square dance callers. They are:

- Weave the ring: A right and left grand without touching hands.
- Wrong way grand: Essentially the same as a right and left grand, but instead of facing the way one does in a right and left grand (towards partner), one faces in the opposite direction (towards corner). Thus men (or gents) move clockwise around the ring and women (ladies) move counter-clockwise around the ring.

== See also ==
- Glossary of partner dance terms
- Modern western square dance
