= Gypsy Gyppo String Band =

- Origin: Seattle, Washington, United States
- Genres: Old-time music
- Years active: 1970s

The Gypsy Gyppo String Band was an American old-time music band, based in Seattle, Washington.

Active in the 1970s, it brought a contemporary sensibility to this music, treating it "as source material rather than holy writ." The band played a key role in reviving this music, bringing it out to the dying milieu of Grange halls and the somewhat-staid milieu of organized Modern western square dance to a hip, young urban audience. It laid the foundation of a square dance and contra dance scene in and around Seattle that continues to this day.

== Members ==
- Warren Argo, banjo
- Jack Link, fiddle
- Armin Barnett, fiddle
- Bob Naess, fiddle
- Sandy Bradley, guitar
- Jerry Mitchell, mandolin
