= Challenge square dance =

Square dance variety

Challenge square dance, also known as Challenge dancing, is modern western square dance focused on the puzzle-solving aspects of square dancing at the most difficult or "challenging" levels.

In modern square dancing, the dancers interpret the caller's directions (calls) to determine whom to act with, where to go, and how to get there. All square dancers learn standard "definitions" of calls, which they recall and use when the caller issues a given command. Most square dancers learn about 100 calls. Challenge dancing involves many more calls, and the definitions and choreographic combinations are more abstract and difficult to process. The same physical movements (e.g. arm turns, passing by) are employed, but deciphering the complex commands and figuring out what you're supposed to do is much more challenging.

== Levels and lists ==
Modern western square dancing is organized into a hierarchy of standard syllabus programs (also called "levels"). Each level is described by a list of the calls that will be used, inclusive of all the material from the lower levels. The higher the program, the more material (i.e. calls) on that list, and the greater ability to recall and handle complexity is required of the dancers. The levels preceding Challenge are: Mainstream, Plus, and Advanced (A1 and A2).

There are five Challenge levels: Basic Challenge (C1), Extended Challenge (C2), Extended Challenge (C3A), Challenge 3B (C3B) and Challenge 4 (C4). The first three of these are maintained and organized by Callerlab, while the last two exist on a more ad hoc basis, maintained by a small set of interested callers. As a result of this there are a few different C4 lists, mostly the same, but with various differences.

== What makes Challenge dancing challenging? ==
C1 dancers must be familiar with about 250 calls (including those from Mainstream, Plus, and Advanced). By C3, the dancers must be familiar with more than 400 calls. C4 dancers typically know at least 700 calls.

Challenge square dancing not only involves knowing many more calls, but is typified by the extensive use of Concepts, abstract and physical formations, "Phantom" dancers, and call deconstruction (such as Fractionalization).

Some square dance calls are more complex than others, involving more series of actions and more abstract identifications of whom to do the action with. Challenge lists include more of these complex calls, but none are by themselves more complex than calls at the Advanced level. Much of Challenge dancing uses basic calls (such as "Right And Left Thru", or notably, "Circulate"). However, Challenge demands that the dancers have precise understanding of the call definitions, and combines and modifies calls in a way that yields more complex interpretations.

=== Concepts ===
In addition to the calls which denote a particular dance action, Challenge dancing makes extensive use of "concepts" which denote modifications to calls – either how they are executed or to whom they apply.

There are only a few concepts before C1, e.g., the "As Couples" concept in Advanced. Each Challenge level adds about another ten new concepts. As with calls, the number of concepts at C4 is not as well defined. In addition, concepts can be nested, so that a call is modified by more than one. For example, "Tandem" means that two dancers one behind the other act as one dancer, while "Stable" means that the dancers are to move from place to place as the call would normally require but without changing their facing direction as they normally would. The caller can ask that a call be done "Stable Tandem" which means that pairs of dancers must act together to execute the call, but as they do this none of them turn.

=== Formations ===
Just as Plus adds Diamonds and Advanced adds Hourglasses, Challenge dancing adds new formations which have their own rules for circulation as well as calls that apply specifically to them. Additional formations include Butterflies, Galaxies, Triangles, Xs, and Zs.

Also, many formations used at lower levels are extended to include cases where they are "distorted" – while they have the same number of dancers and the dancers follow the same rules of interaction, they are not spaced the same way. For example, a wave may be "offset" so that the two halves are not lined up with each other, or a "parallelogram" consisting of two lines offset from each other can be considered to be two "boxes" even though the dancers in each box are not adjacent to each other. Irregular distortions, e.g., where four arbitrary dancers not lined up in any obvious way are asked to act as a wave, may also be used. In each case, the dancers must follow the rules of the basic call, but adjust their actual movements so that they correspond to the positions of the distorted formation.

=== Phantoms ===
Challenge dancing makes extensive use of "phantoms" – imaginary dancers who hold positions in a formation that is only partially filled by real dancers. Challenge dancers must learn to do their part of a call in a particular formation even though many of the other dancers – possibly all of them – are missing. This requires both a clear understanding of the call definition and the ability to remember where the positions of the formation are without the usual visual and tactile cues.

Calls which cause the dancers to change from one formation to another ("shape-changers") are especially challenging to dance with phantoms because the positions themselves will be changing and the entire formation may have to move to make room for other formations (even ones that have no real dancers at all to mark their position).

=== Fractionalization ===
Frequent use is made in Challenge dancing of fractionalized calls, both explicitly (e.g., the caller asks the dancers to do half of something) and implicitly through concepts. Many calls are defined to have specific "parts". Other calls can be broken down naturally based on the nature of the movement involved (e.g., a Hinge is half of a Trade).

Starting at the C1 level, concepts are introduced which operate on call parts. For example, the "Finish" concept means to do all of the call except for the first part. At higher levels there are meta-concepts which involve applying concepts to only certain parts of a call (e.g., "Evenly" means that only the even-numbered parts of a call should be affected by the specified concept).

To properly apply these concepts, the dancer must have both an excellent understanding of the definitions of the basic calls, including how the parts are defined, and the ability to keep track in real-time of what concepts are being applied to which parts.

== Challenge dancing organizations and events ==
=== Clubs ===
Some Challenge dancing is done in clubs similar to those at lower levels. In general, because of the limited number of dancers and callers, the higher the level the fewer clubs there will be. There are only a few cities that have clubs, with a live caller, dancing higher than C1 on a weekly basis.

=== Tape groups ===
Dancers who are interested in learning or dancing a particular Challenge level often form private groups and dance using recordings.

=== Regional events ===
In addition to local clubs, in many places there are events organized to offer Challenge dancing to the dancers of a larger geographic area on a less-frequent basis (e.g., monthly). These often feature callers from other areas.

Some general square dance conventions and festivals at the regional or state level include a Challenge hall, but they typically have very limited offerings above C1.

=== National and international events ===
The largest Challenge event currently operating is the multi-level Academy for Advanced and Challenge Enthusiasts (AACE), held annually in June. This event has dedicated halls for C1, C2, C3A, C3B, and C4. (It also includes an A2 hall.)

Challenge dancing is included in the much larger National Square Dance Convention (NSDC), but there is typically only one hall for Challenge and the emphasis is on the lower Challenge levels.

The annual convention of the International Association of Gay Square Dance Clubs (IAGSDC) has a much more extensive Challenge program that is attended by many non-gay dancers.

In Europe, the biennial iPAC (International Plus, Advanced, and Challenge) convention offers dedicated halls for all the Challenge levels. This was last held in 2019. It has been replaced by MainPAC https://www.mainpac.dance/

Many other events held annually at various dance facilities attract Challenge dancers from a wide area who are interested in particular levels or callers.

== See also ==
- Square dance club
- Square dance program
