= Square dance club =

Square dance clubs are the primary form for organization within the recreational activity of square dancing, and more specifically modern western square dance. This article's focus is the modern western square dance club, and it is understood in the context of this article that when the terms "square dance club" or "square dance" are used it refers to the form of square dance called "modern western square dance".

Square dance clubs are primarily, but not exclusively, local in character. A square dance club is only as strong as its members, i.e. individual square dancers.

== Promoting and advancing square dance ==
The club's primary goal is to promote and advance square dance as a recreational activity. Typically clubs accomplish this goal through the following activities:

- Providing classes and other training opportunities to new, as well as experienced dancers
- Showcasing the activity through public performances
- Organizing dances
- Participation in other associations dedicated to the promotion and advancement of square dancing
- Providing employment and training opportunities to square dance callers.

This is not an exclusive list, and square dance clubs are constantly on the look out for new ways to achieve their goals. Associations, partnerships and other cooperative ventures have become increasingly more important to square dance clubs. Membership in square dance clubs seems to have peaked in the late '70s and early '80s, and has gradually decreased since that time.

=== Classes and training for dancers ===
Providing classes and training opportunities is the main activity for the majority of square dance clubs. This activity develops competent dancers, a core membership for the club, club solidarity and feeling, and a renewable base for the sustainability of the club. Most clubs start classes in September and/or January, although strategies are being developed for starting classes more often.

Callerlab recommends that the Mainstream program be taught in no less than 56 hours. Depending on the length of the individual class and how often one meets, it can take a half year or longer to learn the full program. Therefore, consideration is being given to many different ways to quicken the learning curve, and to get new dancers on the dance floor.

Callerlab also dictates what the plus, advanced 1 and 2, and 4 levels of challenge programs are.

Callerlab not only has a number of American callers that are members, but callers from all over the world.

In Europe, most notably in Denmark, there have been recognized a series of partial dance levels with corresponding dances available at those partway points (Mainstream 23, 45, 53, 69). The American Callers Association also has a simplified program, called "1". In America, clubs sponsoring classes often hold "Red-light/Green-light" dances, where alternating tips are called at a level where class members can participate. These accommodations allow dancers to begin attending dances quicker in the learning cycle.

Some clubs, especially those with younger or more motivated dancers, teach at accelerated rates. As an example, Tech Squares, associated with Massachusetts Institute of Technology, teaches the longer Plus program in one semester (12 classes of roughly 90 minutes of teaching time). Other clubs have reported success with intensive courses of one or two weekends to learn the Mainstream level, while other areas offer a "Five Saturday, or Sunday" program to instruct new students in the program.

=== Public performance ===
This is a way of bringing public attention to the club, with the hope of recruiting more members. Public performances may be those done in public areas (malls, fairs, exhibitions) or it may refer to televised performances.

=== Organizing dances ===
Organizing dances is one of the primary activity of clubs. In addition to sheer enjoyment, dances provide the club's members and members of other clubs the opportunity to practice the skills learned in classes. It also gives the club an opportunity to showcase itself to the wider square dance community, provides dancers an opportunity to socialize, and provides employment for callers.

=== Participating in associations ===
Square dance clubs participate in square dance associations of regional, area-wide, national and special interest character, as well as non-square dance association and organizations.

=== Employment and training for square dance callers ===
Employment of square dance callers is a key means of securing competent dancers for the club, and for the activity as a whole.

Callers will have resources available to them that the general public may not know about. By contacting a caller, you may find information on the activity in your area that is not widely publicized.

Training for callers is done by other callers; some of whom have been Certified by organizations. Training can be done in seminars and in week-long classes. A caller is never done with education as he/she is always trying to improve their craft.

== Dress code ==
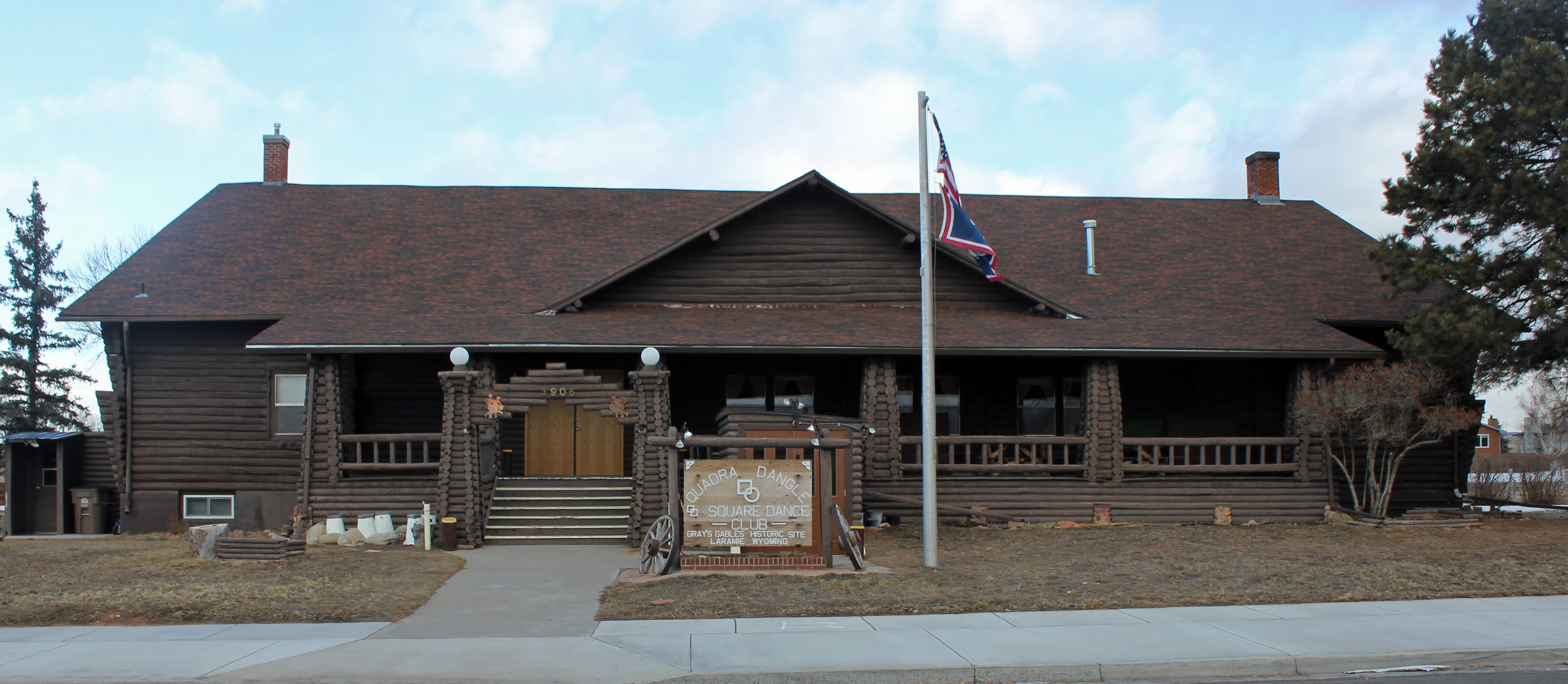
The Union Pacific Athletic Club, located at 3905 Grays Gable Road in Laramie, Wyoming. The property, listed on the National Register of Historic Places, now houses the Quadra Dangle Square Dance Club.

Some clubs have a policy regarding appropriate clothing at club events; others do not. This is referred to as a dress code. Clubs that sponsor dances are encouraged to advertise the dress code that is appropriate for their dance.
