= Dos-à-dos =

Dos-à-dos (French for "back-to-back") may refer to:

- Dosado or do-si-do, dance move
- Dos-à-dos binding of two books into one volume
- Dos-à-dos (carriage)
