= IPAC =

IPAC may refer to:

- Infection prevention and control
- Infrared Processing and Analysis Center, a NASA science center at Caltech
- International Particle Accelerator Conference, the largest scientific conference on the topic of accelerator physics
- International Plus, Advanced & Challenge Square Dance Convention, an international square dance event
- Inter-Parliamentary Alliance on China
- Iraq Peace Action Coalition, an antiwar organization based in Minneapolis, Minnesota
- Internet Protocol Automatic Configuration, see Zero-configuration networking § Address selection
- IpAc, a shorthand for the chemical isopropyl acetate
- Inter-Party Advisory Committee, in Ghana; see Jerry Rawlings § 1996 elections
- Indian Political Action Committee, India

== See also ==
- iPAQ, a personal digital assistant from Compaq (now Hewlett Packard)
- AIPAC, American Israel Public Affairs Committee
- OPAC, Online Public Access Catalog
