= Hoedown =

American folk dance

A hoedown is a type of American folk dance or square dance in duple meter, and also the musical form associated with it.

== Overview ==
The most popular sense of the term is associated with Americans in rural or southeastern parts of the country, particularly Appalachia. It is a dance in quick movement most likely related to the jig, reel or clog dance. In contest fiddling, a hoedown is a tune in fast 2/4 time. In many contests, fiddlers are required to play a waltz, a hoedown, and a "tune of choice", which must not be a waltz or a hoedown (typically it is a jig or a schottische).

In modern western square dance, a hoedown is a piece of music used for a patter call (a call that is spoken or chanted, rather than sung to the tune of a popular song), or the recording that contains this piece of music. In the early days of the Western square dance revival (the 1940s and early 1950s), most hoedowns were traditional fiddle tunes; since the late 1950s, recordings of simple chord progressions, with no discernible melody, have also been sold to callers under the name "hoedown". In the 1940s and early 1950s, the term "hoedown" was sometimes used to mean a call made up of parts of other calls. "Hoedown" was, and occasionally still is, also used to mean a dance party jointly sponsored by several dance clubs or by a federation of clubs.

== References in modern culture ==
The most famous hoedown in classical music is the section entitled "Hoe-Down" from the Rodeo ballet by Aaron Copland (1942). The most frequently heard version is from the Four Dance Episodes from Rodeo, which Copland extracted from the ballet shortly after its premiere; the dance episodes were first performed in 1943 by the Boston Pops conducted by Arthur Fiedler. An arrangement of this song featured on Emerson, Lake & Palmer's album Trilogy.

Many episodes of the improvisational comedy show Whose Line Is It Anyway? featured an impromptu hoedown singing competition.

Hoedown is a dance that is celebrated every day in Disney Magic Kingdom Florida in the Frontierland section of the park. They officially started that celebration in honor of the opening day of the Country Bear Jamboree on October 1, 1971.

== See also ==
- Cèilidh
- Hootenanny
