= Lloyd Shaw =

Lloyd Shaw may refer to:

- Lloyd Shaw (educator) (1890–1958), educator credited with bringing about the revival of square dancing in America
- Lloyd R. Shaw (1914–1993), Canadian businessman, political activist and organizer
