= International Plus, Advanced & Challenge Square Dance Convention =

The international Plus, Advanced & Challenge Square Dance Convention, also known as iPAC, is an international square dance event that has been taking place every two years in Barmstedt, Germany, since 1993. It is usually held in the middle of July, at the first weekend of the school holidays in the German Bundesland of Schleswig-Holstein. Square dance events begin a few days before the official beginning of the Convention with the C1 and Plus programs – the so-called "Trail-End" dances. The convention offers all square dance programs from Plus to C4.

iPAC is the largest European event of its kind. Germany, Sweden, Denmark, and Great Britain are particularly well represented, but participants come from many countries, including France, the Czech Republic, Belgium, the Netherlands, Switzerland, Austria, Finland, the United States, Canada, Russia and Japan. The callers are equally international.

iPAC 2005 was the seventh event of the series and took place from July 8–10, 2005. 850 dancers from 14 countries participated. There were ten staff callers, who came from Germany, Canada, Japan and the United States, and an additional five guest callers, as well as an International Caller Showcase.

The 8th iPAC took place July 18–22, 2007, with callers from Sweden, Denmark, the USA, Japan, England and Germany.

The 9th iPAC took place July 22–26, 2009.

The 10th iPAC took place July 8–10, 2011.

The 11th iPAC took place June 28–30, 2013.

The 12th iPAC took place 22–26 July 2015.

The 13th iPAC had been scheduled for 26–30 July 2017, but was canceled.

The 14th iPAC took place 26-28 July 2019.

Dance events in 2021 were cancelled due to the coronavirus pandemic.

In 2023, mainPAC took over organization of the binennial international dance, moving location from Barmstedt to Frankfurt-am-Main, Germany.
