= Promenade (dance move) =

Dance move in country and square dance

Promenade is a basic dance move in a number of dances such as English Country Dance, contra dance, and square dance. The name comes from the French word for "walk" and is a basic description of the dance action.

== Dance position and handholds ==
When executing the move, partners stand side-by-side in a promenade position, and act as a single unit. Customarily the man (or gent) stands to the left of the lady, his right hip touching or almost touching her left hip. Note that this promenade position is not the same as that promenade position defined in ballroom dances. Traditionally, the lead role in the dance was held by a man while the follow role was held by his woman dancing partner.

The partners might take any of a number of different promenade handholds. These are generally determined by the specific dance or local dance traditions. Some of these different handholds are:

- Basic promenade or Skirt Skater's handhold: The follow extends their left hand horizontally, palm down, across the front of the lead, and the lead takes it in their left hand. The follow places their right hand at the right side of their waist or slightly behind their right hip, and the lead holds this hand loosely with their right hand. The follow might also use their right hand to hold on to a full skirt with petticoats, sway the skirt in time to the music as a flourish ("skirtwork"), or simply place their hand on their waist. In this case, the leader places their right hand on the small of the follow's back.
- Skater's handhold: Both hands are held in front of the partners at waist-level. The left hands are held in front of the lead's waist; the right hands are held in front of the follow's waist. The lead's right arm crosses in front of the follow's left arm.
- Varsouvienne handhold (also called Shadow, Horseshoe, Cape Position): The lead holds the follow's left hand with their left hand in front of the follow's shoulder. The lead crosses their right arm behind the follow and holds the follow's right hand with their right hand in front of the follow's right shoulder. The lead's arm is held just above the follow's shoulder.
- Cuddle, (also called Wrap Position or Sweetheart's Wrap): The lead wraps their right arm around the follow's waist; the follow wraps their left arm around their front to hold the lead's right hand. The follow wraps their right arm over their left arm and across their front to hold the lead's left hand. Hands are at waist level.

== The promenade in contra dance ==
In contra dancing, promenades are used to move a couple to the opposite side of the set. The lead may choose to spin the follow under their arm at the end as a flourish.

== The promenade in modern western square dance ==
In square dancing, and in particular modern western square dance, when a promenade is called it is understood to be a "couples' promenade" involving all four couples. The couples assume a promenade position, each turn to the right as a unit, and walk counterclockwise around the ring. If not specified how far to walk, they walk to the gent's home position, and then each couples turn as a unit to face into the center of the set. If close to home (¼ of the way or less), couples promenade a complete tour of the ring.

The caller can also specifically say "promenade home" or "promenade all the way" (or other variations on the wording) with the same result.

The gent might twirl the lady under his arm at the end of the move as a flourish. If the partners are ¼ of the ring or less away from his home position, then they promenade a full circle around to get back to his home.

The caller may fractionalize the call by specifically requiring the dancers to promenade only ¼, ½, or ¾ of the way around the ring.

The caller may also designate a specific couple or specific couples to promenade.

The caller may also require the dancers to continue promenading without stopping at the home position, by calling something like "promenade – Don't stop or slow-down". This will be a lead-in to a new call, whereas a "promenade home" is considered the end of a square dance sequence in most cases.

=== Other calls in the promenade family of calls ===
There is one other call in the promenade family as defined by Callerlab, the largest international association of square dance callers.

- Single promenade: Dancers individually turn to the right, and promenade single-file around the ring. This type of promenade is also referred to as Indian-style. In addition to all eight individuals promenading single-file, variations of this call include requiring only specific individuals to do the call (boys only, girls only, etc.), and designating whether the specific individuals should promenade inside the ring or outside the ring.

=== Variations on the promenade ===
The caller may require the dancers to travel clockwise around the ring by calling a wrong way promenade (as couples) or single wrong way promenade (as individuals).

A scatter promenade is a gimmick call where all the couples on the dance floor promenade randomly, until they are typically instructed to make either a group of four with another, usually closest, couple or a group of eight with three other nearby couples. This functions as a social mixer forcing dancers to form new squares.

A star promenade is an entirely different call but nevertheless part of the family. It consists of four dancers in the center of the set making a star configuration, with their centermost arms up like the spokes of a wheel, or the ribbons of a maypole. They walk forward counterclockwise. Their outermost arms are wrapped around a partner's waist who walks alongside of them.

== See also ==
- Modern western square dance
- Western promenade dance
- Contra dance choreography
