= Scissors dance =

Scissors dance may refer to:

- Danza de tijeras, Peru
- Sher (dance), an East European Jewish dance
