= Traditional square dance =

One of two American types of square dancing

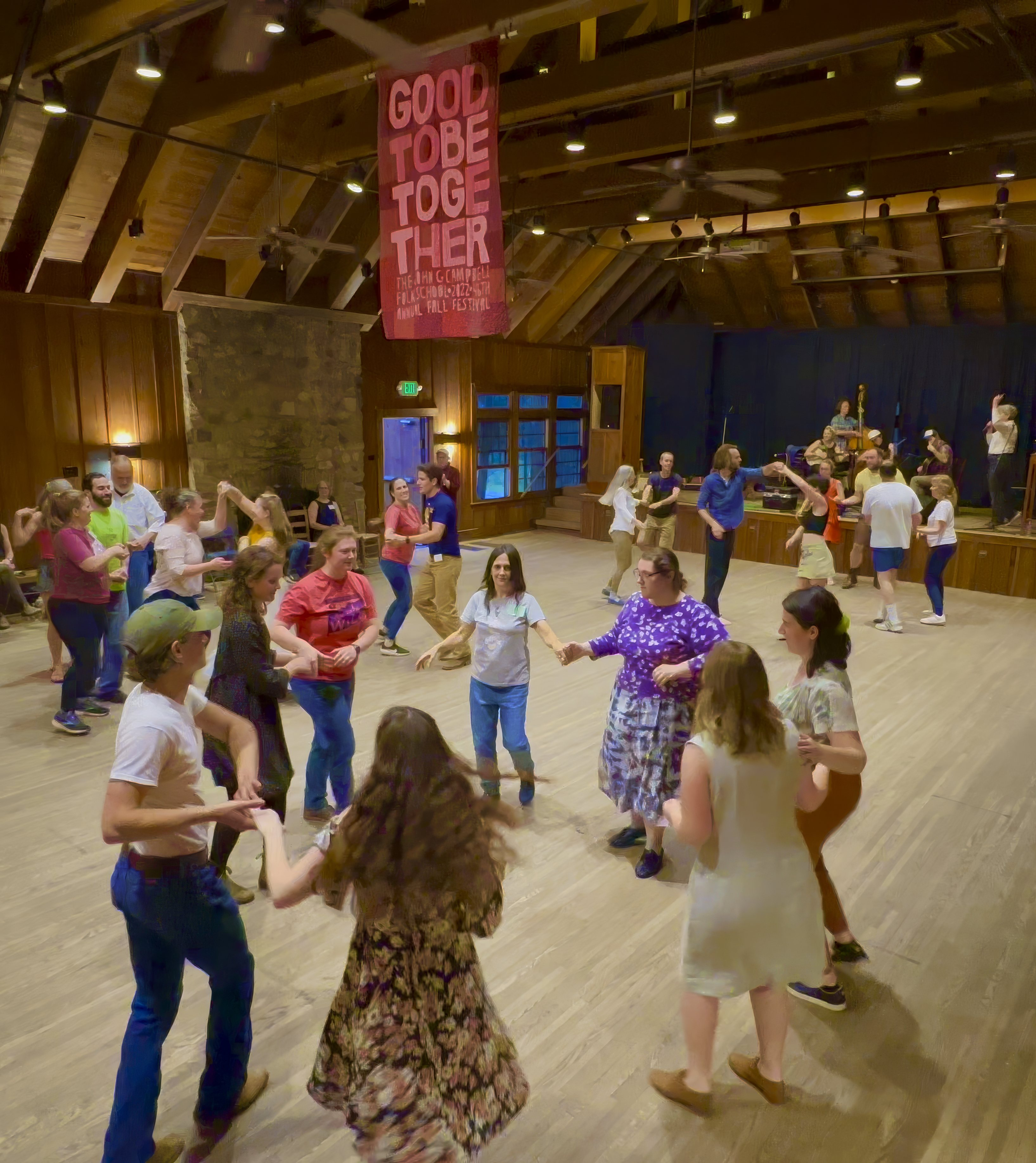
A traditional square dance at the John C. Campbell Folk School in North Carolina

Traditional square dance is a generic American term for any style of American square dance other than modern Western. The term can mean (1) any of the American regional styles (broadly, Northeastern, Southeastern, and Western) that existed before around 1950, when modern Western style began to develop out of a blend of those regional styles, or (2) any style (other than modern Western) that has survived, or been revived, since around 1950. The term Traditional Square Dance is also used in England to refer to dances collected from villages in the first half of the 20th century.

A traditional square dance in Concord, Massachusetts

Traditional square dance can be distinguished from modern western square dance by the following characteristics:

1. A limited number of basic movements, or “calls,” enabling the average dancer to join the group by assimilation rather than by taking a series of lessons.
2. Dance figures (sequences of basic movements) that are called in a set order and repeated, rather than improvised by the caller. (In Southeastern style the caller chooses figures from a repertoire of a dozen or two and can call them in any order, but the order of movements within each figure does not change.)
3. The use of live music as the norm.

In addition, because there is no governing body to set standards for traditional square dancing, each caller decides which basic movements and dance figures he or she will use. There are regional variations in how dancers execute the basic movements, usually having to do with hand or arm position. The same dance figure may have different names in different regions; the same name may refer to different dance figures, or even (in the case of "do-si-do") different basic movements. This lack of standardization does not present a problem to the dancers, because at least one of two conditions is always true: either the caller walks the dancers through the figures before calling them to music, or the event is attended almost entirely by local people familiar with that caller's repertoire.

== Types of traditional square dance ==
There are at least three broad categories of events that can be referred to as "traditional square dances".

1. "Survival" dances: There are a few communities in the United States and Canada where one may find dance events consisting primarily of traditional squares, or of traditional squares alternating with some form of couple dancing (such as waltz, two-step, foxtrot, or country/western dance) or solo dancing (such as flatfooting or clogging). Each region has its own way of dancing, playing the music, and delivering the calls (if any); the dancers, musicians, and callers have typically learned their style from prior generations. There may or may not be some standardization of style within a region, but there is no continent-wide standardization across regions.
2. "Revival" dances: In many cities and college towns there are dance events, open to the public, that consist primarily of Anglo-American group dances. The program may feature mainly squares, mainly contra dances, or a mixture of both. The style of squares chosen depends on the caller and may or may not conform to the local indigenous square dance style—indeed, it may be a blend of various regional styles—but it is likely to be closer to traditional than to modern western square dance. Musicians and callers typically learn not only from local mentors but also from books, recordings, and travel to and communication with other artists continent-wide; this learning process leads to a certain amount of de facto standardization.
3. "Fun nights": Many callers conduct programs of easy dancing for people who do not square dance regularly, such as guests at a wedding or birthday party or members of a non-dance organization like a school, house of worship, or civic or social group. Such events are known in the calling trade as "fun nights", "barn dances", or "one-night stands". A caller programming such an event is likely to use a good deal of traditional dance material, even if they are primarily a modern Western caller.

== Regional styles ==
Traditional square dances have been classified into three major types: Northeastern, Southeastern, and Western. The first two have distinctive and unique characteristics; the Western type is thought to be a blend of the two. There are many regional and local styles of square dancing; each has been adapted through the years from one or more of the three major types.

=== Northeast ===
A square dance in the northeastern tradition

The Northeastern tradition, descended from the 18th-century cotillion and the 19th-century quadrille, comprises primarily figures in which the action is initiated by a facing pair of couples, either the heads or sides. Many of the basic movements (such as "ladies chain" and "right and left") that make up the figures are common to the entire Northeastern repertoire. As in its ancestors the cotillion and quadrille, the movements in this style of square dance are synchronized with the phrases of the music. If the dancers know a particular dance by heart, they can execute it without calls, and indeed some communities that dance quadrille-type squares do so without the aid of a caller.

Areas where Northeastern squares have been documented include Cape Breton Island, Newfoundland, Prince Edward Island, Quebec, Ontario, New England, Upstate New York, Michigan, and parts of Pennsylvania.

=== Southeast ===
The Southeastern tradition, whose origin is still uncertain, comprises primarily figures in which a single couple visits each of the other couples in turn. The structure is not dependent on the four-couple square formation, and the dance is often done in a large circle containing any number of couples. (By the 1920s some communities had adopted a system in which every other couple led out at the same time.) Each figure (such as "Bird in the Cage") is unique, being made up of a series of movements that appear in no other dance; typically the whole figure has a name but its constituent movements do not. The dance is generally not synchronized with the musical phrase, although the dancers move in time with the beat. At the direction of the caller, the active couple may execute the same figure with each couple it visits, or a different figure with each couple. In either case the caller chooses the figures from a local repertoire of a dozen or two, each figure being danced the same way whenever it is chosen.

Areas where Southeastern squares have been documented include the southern Appalachian Mountains and adjacent regions (Virginia, West Virginia, Kentucky, Tennessee, North Carolina, Alabama, Georgia) and the Ozarks (Missouri and Arkansas).

=== West ===
The Western tradition appears to have developed as settlers from the eastern United States took their local dance forms along as they moved west. It combines elements of the quadrille and visiting-couple traditions.

Areas where traditional Western squares have been documented include Iowa, Nebraska, Colorado, Texas, and Arizona.

=== Regional mixing ===
As interest in square dancing increased during the 20th century, schoolteachers and recreation leaders began using these dances in their programs. These leaders learned not only from local callers but also from books, recordings, and correspondence with other leaders. The result has been a blurring of the lines between regional styles; since the 1920s, callers have been increasingly likely to incorporate in their programs (knowingly or not) calls and figures from styles outside their own area, and even from modern Western square dancing. Some dances composed by modern Western callers in the late 1940s and early 1950s, but no longer used in the modern Western network, are now thought of as "traditional".

== Music ==
Traditional square dance is almost always danced to live music (the main exception is "fun nights", which are often conducted by modern Western callers using traditional material with recorded music). Since the 19th century, much of the square dance repertoire has been derived from jigs (in 6/8 time) and reels (in 2/4 time) from Scotland and Ireland. In some regions, such as New England, these tunes are played in relatively unaltered form. In the southern Appalachians and the Ozarks, the style is more likely to conform to the old time music tradition. Quebec has its own dance music tradition, which is based on Irish music but has evolved into a unique style. Cape Breton Island has a well-preserved style of dance music, based on Scottish fiddling.

Square dance music was traditionally played on acoustic instruments, and in many places it still is. The fiddle is the most common lead instrument; other lead instruments, and instruments that carry the rhythm and harmony, vary by region. In areas that were settled by Europeans relatively early, such as New England and eastern Canada, the piano is the mainstay of square dance rhythm and chording. In the Southern United States and along the path of westward expansion, instruments like the banjo and guitar, which are more portable and easier to make and repair than the piano, were and are more common. The double bass has long been popular as a supplement to the rhythm section. Certain instruments are popular in specific regions; examples include the accordion in Quebec and Newfoundland and the hammered dulcimer in Michigan and Upstate New York. In some communities where square dancing has survived, the prevailing form of music has become popular songs from the 1930s, 1940s and 1950s, played on instruments such as saxophones, drums, and electric guitars.

The tempo of traditional square dance music can vary widely, depending on the regional style. New England has some of the slowest tempos, from around 108 to 124 bpm. Southern Appalachian tempos are among the fastest, at 130 to 150 bpm. Most other regions fall between those extremes.

Many traditional dance tunes retain the binary form of classical dance, following an "AABB" pattern of two distinct strains played twice each, the "A part" and "B part" typically being 8 measures (16 downbeats) in length, making one playing of the tune 32 measures (64 downbeats). In a few tunes the A and B parts are half the normal length; in others, particularly those derived from marches or rags, one or more parts are twice the normal length. Practice varies among fiddlers as to whether to repeat the parts of such non-standard tunes.

In some areas, notably Quebec and parts of the southern and southwestern United States, there is a strong tradition of playing "crooked" tunes — tunes in which at least one part has more or fewer beats than the norm. Because callers in those areas do not synchronize their calls with the phrases of the music, crooked tunes do not bother them. In regions where the callers and dancers are used to staying "on phrase" (as in a contra dance), crooked tunes are not used for square dancing.

In the northeastern United States, traditional square dances are frequently done to popular songs in addition to, or instead of, jigs and reels. Where this is done, the caller typically sings the calls, substituting dance directions for some of the words of the song but reverting to the original lyrics for the last few measures of each chorus, often encouraging the dancers to sing along. Singing callers normally choose songs that are similar in structure to fiddle tunes—the same number of measures, played at a similar tempo. There are exceptions, however: a waltz such as "Take Me Out to the Ball Game" may be sped up from its original 3/4 time to a fast 6/8 time.

== Organization and social customs ==
"Survival" dances are typically either run by a band or caller as a profit-making enterprise, or sponsored by a non-dance organization (such as a church, a Grange, or a fire department) as a social service and/or a fundraiser for its other activities. The dance may be advertised as open to the public, but the vast majority of those attending are likely to be local people who know one another. Almost everyone present is likely to know the dances: often there will be little or no teaching or walkthrough, and in some communities the same few dances are done at every meeting, without a caller. The dancers may dress up a bit—though not necessarily in square-dance-specific costumes—and they may attend and dance exclusively with a spouse or other regular partner.

"Revival" dances are usually run by a nonprofit organization set up specifically to sponsor dance events, though they may also be run by a band or caller. The dance is normally open to the public; a few series are advertised as "for experienced dancers", but it is typically left to the dancers themselves to decide whether they qualify as experienced. Often a large percentage of those attending are not very familiar with the dances; the caller is likely to walk through most or all of the figures before the music starts. Casual attire and frequent partner changes are the norm; it is considered acceptable to ask a stranger to dance.

== See also ==
- Ted Sannella
- Lloyd Shaw
- George Wade
