= Pettipants =

Type of lingerie

Pettipants are a type of lingerie worn by women. The name is a portmanteau of petticoat (ultimately from French petit, "small") and pants. Pettipants are similar to long shorts, though they may be made from material such as cotton and lace, and usually have ruffles down each leg. They are available in different lengths up to knee length. In the sixties, they were available in many styles and colors. Nylon and polyester fabrics were used rather than cotton. Lace trim was used. Pettipants are a replacement for a slip, and can be regarded as a half-slip with an extra portion that goes underneath the groin.

When pettipants were fashionable (they were worn widely in the US during the 1960s) they were usually worn under skirts, dresses, culottes, or walking shorts for modesty or comfort. They are not considered a modern or popular style; currently they are most likely to be worn by square dancers or people involved in historical reenactment.

Unlike other types of underwear, pettipants will not ride up and eliminate hot-weather chafing.

== See also ==
- Bloomers
