= Do-si-do =

Dance move

Do-si-do /ˌdoʊsiːˈdoʊ/, also spelled dosado, do-se-do, or dos-à-dos, is a dance move found in several forms of social dance, including square dance, contra dance, English country dance, and Scottish country dance. The move involves two dancers approaching each other, passing around one another back-to-back, and returning to their original positions without turning to face each other during the maneuver. It requires coordination and spatial awareness between partners.

== Description ==
It is a circular movement where two people, who are initially facing each other, walk around each other without or almost without turning, i.e., facing in the same direction (same wall) all the time. In most cases it takes 6–8 counts to complete.

The movement is basically defined by as follows:

- dancers advance and pass right shoulders,
- without turning each dancer moves to the right passing in back of the other dancer. At this moment the partners face away from each other,
- then moving backwards dancers pass left shoulders returning to starting position.

The actual steps vary in specific dances.

Considering the amount of space in which to accomplish the figure, the partners might adjust their shoulders slightly diagonally to allow for less sideways movement during the shoulder passes.

The advancing pass may also be by the left shoulders, although it may be called as a "left do-si-do", "see-saw", "do-si-don't", or "reverse do-si-do".

While executing this move, women may move their skirts with their hands from side to side (skirtwork), flaring it to the right as right shoulders pass, and to the left as left shoulders pass. Men may decide to place their arms on top of each other, in a style very similar to Russian folk dancing.

== Spelling usage by different dances ==
The term is a corruption of the original French term dos-à-dos for the dance move, which means "back to back", as opposed to "vis-à-vis" which means "face to face".

Do-si-do is the most common spelling in modern English dictionaries and is the spelling used in contra dance, sometimes without hyphens. A related variant is do-se-do.

In modern western square dancing, the usual spelling is Dosado which is the closest to the original French form as it’s pronounced in French [Dozado] (used by Callerlab, the largest international association of square dance callers) or DoSaDo (used by the American Callers Association).

Dos-à-dos is still in current use in some dance traditions, such as Scottish country dance.

In English country dance and other British dance forms, it is known as the "back to back".

== Styling ==
Styling traditions, or the addition of flourishes to a basic step, tend to be local, and not all dancers like to do styling, but nevertheless a common styling done to the dosado is the "Hungarian Swing" or "Highland Fling" styling. This addition to the basic step is accomplished as follows:

- The two people, who are initially facing each other, step forward as if they will pass each other by the right shoulder (as in a normal Dosado), but they stop momentarily when they are right hip-to-right hip
- They stretch right arms across each other and place right hands on each other's waist, simultaneously they lift left arms up with left hands above their own heads, in what is perceived as a "Highland Fling" position
- They pivot around 360° together, rotating on the balls of their inner feet
- They release hand holds and lower arms into a neutral stance, and adjust slightly backwards so they are facing each other

Even with styling the move should take no longer to execute than a normal Dosado.

In contra dance it is common for experienced dancers to embellish the move by making one or more counterclockwise turns as they go around the other dancer.

== Dosado variations ==
The Dosado can also be fractionalized—1/4 Dosado results in the active dancers standing side-by-side right hip-to-right hip, 1/2 Dosado results in the active dancers standing back-to-back, and 3/4 Dosado results in the active dancers standing side-by-side left hip-to-left hip. When standing side-to-side the dancers join adjacent hands palm-to-palm to make a mini-wave (in the case of two people), an ocean wave (in the case of three-six people), or a tidal wave (in the case of eight people).

A Dosado 1½ consists of performing a full Dosado followed by an additional half Dosado, typically resulting in the dancers ending back-to-back. Such variations are often regarded as entertaining "gimmicks" within modern square dance communities.

== See also ==
- Contra dance
- English Country Dance
- Glossary of partner dance terms
- Square dance
