= American folk dance =

Contra dance, an American folk dance, being danced in Seattle

American folk dance encompasses several regional folk dances, many of which were influenced by foreign cultures. The play party dance style was developed due to dance being seen as a sin during the Great Revival.

== Background ==
New England country dances are rooted in Scottish and Irish culture, as a large amount of people from these groups settled New England. In New England country dances, couples gather in longways or circular formation. Orchestras playing New England country dances typically have a fiddle, piano, clarinet, and drum.

Appalachian Mountain dances are rooted in German and Irish culture. The dances are primary found in the mountainous regions of Kentucky, Tennessee, North Carolina, and West Virginia. A typical Appalachian Mountain dance has couples dance in a circular pattern. These dances usually begin with a leading couple starting the dance, after which the other couples copy them. Fiddles, five-string banjos, and guitars are used to play the music for Appalachian Mountain dances. The dulcimore is also used for a background to the song.

The play party games style of dance came from the Great Revival in Cane Ridge, Kentucky. Play party games served as a substitute for dancing, which was seen as a wicked sport, because games were permitted. Singing and hand clapping was used as music for play party games—any other music would make the dance a sin. People performing the dance form a circle or two parallel lines. Play party games style dances are found in areas in Kentucky, Tennessee, Indiana, Illinois, Arkansas, Iowa, and Texas where dancing is still banned.

The square dance isn't rooted in any foreign culture. The square dance is performed by four or eight couples. In the square dance, a leading couple—known as a caller—calls out instructions for the other dancers. It is believed that the square dance went west from Ohio, Indiana, and Illinois. The music for the square dance is primary played on the piano or fiddle.

== Regional histories ==
=== Chicago ===
The quadrille became popular in 1834. European immigrants kept the waltz, schottische, and polka alive in Chicago and reintroduced the dances. The two world fairs held in Chicago increased interest in folk dance. Starting in the 1920s, folk dancing school were created by related ethnic groups. Served folk dance companies for created from 1970 to 1990.

=== Great Plains ===
Settlers brought the quadrille to the great plains. Due to the unavailability of dancing masters or schools, one dancer would call out the figures.

During Spanish rule of Texas, some couples danced the polka or bolero to the music of a fandango and others danced at forts or on ranches. Balls were also held once a year. The upper-class created dances similar to peasant dances under Mexican rule of Texas. Due to the large number of men in Texas, —now part of the United States— men danced as partners. Since there was a lack of pianos, fiddles, or accordions, people made music with what they had. People in West Texas would travel 50 miles to see a fiddler. After preachers denounced dancing as an instrument of the devil, many turned to play party games. Play party games was prominent in Texas, Oklahoma, and Kansas.

Developments, such as the radio, increased peoples' contact with the rest of the world, causing folk dances to decrease in popularity. After World War II, folk dances became popular again. Public-address systems allow for a larger group of dancers to hear the caller's call, and allowed for the standardization of calls.
