= Rueda de Casino =

Type of dance

Rueda de Casino (Rueda) is a type of salsa round dance, born from the Cuban dance style known as "casino." Depending on the setting, the dance can be either choreographed or improvised.

== History ==
Casino was developed in Havana, Cuba in the early 1950s. Casino traces its origin as a partner dance from Cuban Urban Son and Cuban Cha Cha Cha, fused with partner figures and turns adopted from the Cuban Mambo, Rumba Guaguancó and North American Jive. Casino is different from other types of Salsa dance styles because of its spontaneous use of the rich Afro-Cuban dance vocabulary within a Casino dance; a Casino dancer frequently improvises references to other dances, integrating movements, gestures and extended passages from the folkloric and popular heritage. This is particularly true of African-descended Cubans. Such improvisations might include extracts of rumba, dances for African deities (Orishas), the older popular dances such as Cha Cha Cha and Danzón as well as anything the dancer may feel.

Casino danced with multiple partners in a circular fashion emerged in the late 1950s under the name "Rueda del Casino". This dance was exclusively danced at the Club Casino Deportivo, but quickly spread to other clubs around the beachfronts and later to the capital. While the dance became popular, so did the phrases "vamos a hacer la rueda como en el Casino" (let's go dance "rueda" like in the Casino) and "vamos a hacer la rueda del Casino" (let's go dance "rueda" of the Casino). Given the popularity of the music and dance, numerous Rueda de Casino dance groups appeared on the island made up of friends, family members, and professional dancers. At the end of the 1970s, Rueda de Casino groups became well-known through the popular TV show "Para Bailar".

As a result of the Castro regime, many Cubans emigrated to the US, many to the Miami area. They took their culture with them, including various dishes, music and dancing. Rueda de Casino began to slowly make its way into the Miami salsa community during the Mariel boatlift, and in the late 1980s and early 1990s it experienced an enormous explosion of popularity. However, the style of Rueda de Casino that became popular was a style somewhat different from its original form. Rene Gueits, founder of "Salsa Lovers" in 1994, changed the Cuban-style Rueda de Casino and structured it. Rene's style adapted the Rueda de Casino steps into a more "disco-like" style, where the Cuban Urban Son, Cuban Cha Cha Cha, and Rumba Guaguancó were completely removed.

From Miami, Rueda de Casino spread first to major U.S. metropolitan centers with large Hispanic populations and eventually to other cities, becoming a popular dance around the United States and the world. Although the majority of the Rueda de Casino dancers have learned from the Miami-style Rueda de Casino syllabus and repertoire, many dancers from Cuba have been able to share the original version of the dance throughout the world, and most recently in the United States.

In 2014, the first International Rueda de Casino Multi Flash Mob took place in which people from 67 countries, including 199 cities, danced Rueda de Casino simultaneously. In 2017, the International Rueda de Casino Multi Flash Mob drew 230 unique groups dancing Rueda de Casino. The differences between the Miami-style Rueda de Casino and the Cuban-style Rueda de Casino are stark, and these differences can be seen throughout the performances of the 230 groups that participated in 2017.

== Description ==
The word "Rueda" is Spanish for a "wheel," referring to the typically circular format of the dance. Rueda dancing requires a minimum of two couples, but could be as large as the maximum number of couples who can create a circle in the dance venue. (If necessary, multiple concentric circles can even be formed.) Since the 1990s, the music most commonly used for Rueda de Casino is either Salsa music or a unique variation of Salsa known as "Timba."

After the initial couples (pairs of dancers) form a circle, dance moves are then called out by one person, a caller (or "líder" or "cantante" in Spanish). Although there are some similarities to square dancing, Rueda de Casino is distinguished by having a caller who is dancing along with the other participants, rather than simply standing on the outside to direct the moves. When danced socially, the order or sequence of the moves in a Rueda de Casino is completely improvised by the caller, so the dancers have to pay close attention.

Many Rueda moves have hand signs to complement the calls; these are useful in noisy venues, where spoken calls might not be easily heard. Many moves involve the swapping of partners, where the partners move around the circle to the next partner. The combination of elaborate dance combinations and constant movement of partners creates a visually spectacular effect. Also, it not uncommon for the Rueda dancers to have fun with coordinated noises such as shouts, stomps, or hand claps.

Traditionally, the names of the moves are called mostly in Spanish, regardless of the country where the dance occurs, although some words can be in English (or Spanglish; e.g., "un fly"). The names of most fundamental moves are similar across the board, but different towns in Cuba did begin to develop their own names for other moves. This is because some pioneers of Rueda de Casino wanted to be unique with their variations and/or simply keep others from participating in their Rueda. Many local versions of the calls (and/or changes to the steps) can now be found; indeed, the variations might change from town-to-town or even in the same town from teacher-to-teacher.

The Rueda dance will either start from "al Medio" (normal closed hold with all the couples stepping in and out of the circle) or from Guapea (stepping forward on the inside foot and backward on the outside foot, tangent to the circle). Some of the most common fundamental moves in Rueda include Dame, Enchufe/Enchufla, Vacila, and Sombrero. There are different hand motions that the caller can use to indicate a specific Rueda move, especially in case one's voice cannot be heard over loud music. For example, the hand signal for the Rueda move "Sombrero" (i.e., the Spanish word for "hat") is the caller tapping the top of his or her head.

== Filmography ==
Rueda de Casino scenes may be seen in the movie Dance with Me and in the music video clip No me dejes de querer by Gloria Estefan. Rueda de casino dance may also be seen in the documentary film "La Salsa Cubana".
