= Lloyd Shaw (educator) =

Lloyd Shaw (1890–1958), also known as Dr. Lloyd "Pappy" Shaw, was an educator, and is generally credited with bringing about the broad revival of square dancing in America. He was superintendent, principal, teacher, and coach for Cheyenne Mountain Schools in Colorado Springs, Colorado, from 1916 to 1951, and taught folk dancing.

== Biography ==
Shaw was born in Denver but the family moved to Southern California when he was two years of age. His father was in the real estate business. The family returned to Denver when Shaw was nine years old, and then to Colorado Springs two years later. He graduated from Colorado College in 1913 and married poet Dorothy Stott Shaw. They had two children; daughter, Doli, and son, David.

He started teaching biology and sophomore English at Colorado Springs High School, and then became superintendent of the Broadmoor District's Cheyenne Mountain School on the outskirts of Colorado Springs.

During his time teaching folk dance he noticed that all the square dancing callers were getting old, and there was no new generation to take over. He also noticed a lack of continuity in the activity in different parts of the country. Shaw came up with a solution that he hoped would keep the activity from dying out.

Shaw traveled the country, and compiled instructions for traditional square dances from different callers all over the country. He documented them, and tried them out on the students he taught. He formed the Cheyenne Mountain Dancers, a high-school exhibition team, which toured the United States in the 1930s and 1940s, appearing in more than 50 major cities.

In 1949 the American Academy of Physical Education cited "the Lloyd Shaw Folk Dance Program as a noteworthy contribution to physical education."

He also wrote books and articles and conducted week-long summer classes for teachers and callers into the 1950s, where he not only taught the dances to other teachers, but taught them also the principles of teaching, and his vision of good dancing.

As the popularity of square dancing grew, square dance callers began extracting individual calls from these dances, and attempts at standardised lists were developed. These lists were later adopted by callers, and organisations such as Callerlab and later the American Callers Association formed to manage and promote a universal list and the type of dance leadership that Shaw envisioned.

Dr. Lloyd Shaw died of a stroke in 1958. The Lloyd Shaw Foundation was created in 1964 to preserve and promote his approach to square dancing.

== Books by Lloyd Shaw ==
- Cowboy Dances: A Collection of Western Square Dances. Caldwell, Idaho: Caxton Printers LTD. Copyright 1939. Revised edition, 1952.
- Cowboys Tunes. Caldwell, Idaho: Caxton Printers LTD. Copyright 1939.
- Nature Notes of the Pikes Peak Region. Colorado Springs: The Apex Book Company. 1916.
- The Littlest Wiseman: a Play Pageant of the Nativity. Caldwell, Idaho: The Caxton Printers, Ltd. 1951.
- The Round Dance Book: A Century of Waltzing. Caldwell, Idaho: Caxton Printers LTD. Copyright 1948.

== See also ==
- List of dancers
