= Cuban salsa =

Dance style

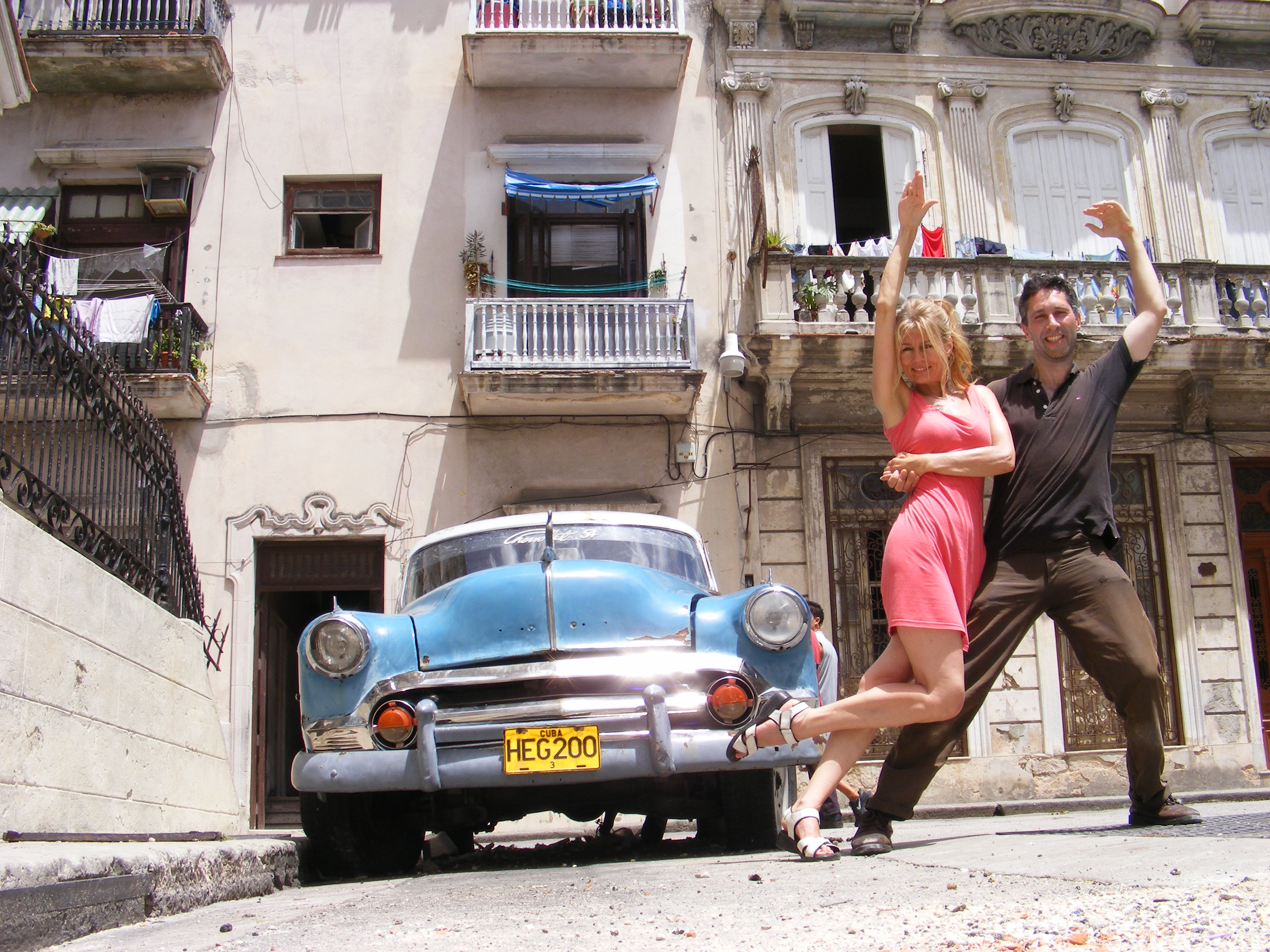
Salsa dancers in Havana, Cuba.

Casino is a dance from Cuba, which has commonly been known as Cuban Salsa or Salsa Cubana since the 1970s to distinguish it from other salsa styles.

Casino takes its name from casinos deportivos, the dance halls popular among better-off, white Cubans during the mid-1950s and onwards where the style was first created and popularised. Historically, Casino traces its roots as a partner dance from Son Cubano, which was fused with partner figures borrowed from Cuban Mambo, Cuban Cha Cha Cha, Rumba Guaguancó, and North American Jive. Similar to Son, Danzón and Cha Cha Cha, it was traditionally danced contratiempo (this means that, unlike salsa, that no step is taken on the first and fifth beats in each clave pattern, and the fourth and eighth beats are emphasized, allowing dancers to contribute to the polyrhythmic pattern of the music through their movements). Casino today is more commonly (although by no means exclusively) danced a tiempo, with the dancers stepping on the first and fifth beats.

Casino is closely intertwined with Afro-Cuban dance traditions, and dancers frequently integrate movements, gestures, and extended passages from Orisha and Rumba as well as older popular dances such as Cha Cha Cha, Mambo and Danzón..

Dancing Casino is an expression of popular social culture in Cuba, and many Cubans consider Casino a part of their social and cultural activities centering on their popular music.

Casino is the basis of Rueda de Casino, a lively dance in the round featuring called dance moves and frequent changes of partner.

== Culture and geography ==
Culturally, Casino is performed as an interplay between genders, with an emphasis on feeling the music, known as sabor ("flavor"). Much of the interplay of Casino style dancing is based on the broader Afro-Caribbean cultural context with emphasis on sexual interplay, teasing, and everyday experience.

Geographically, in Latin America, Casino and its variants are danced in Cuba, the Dominican Republic, and Venezuela. It is also popular in Europe and parts of Asia. In the 1950s, Miami became a spot for Cuban music and salsa dancing, thanks to waves of Cuban immigrants bringing their musical traditions like son, rumba, and cha-cha-cha, sparking a fiery dance culture now called Miami Cuban-style salsa.

== Styles of casino ==
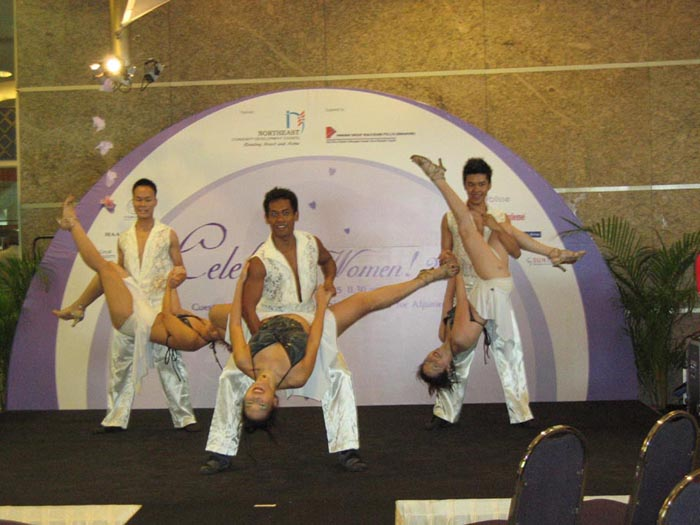
Cuban salsa

=== As a partner dance (Parejas) ===
Casino is danced in three points which makes up a circular motion as partners face each other in intricate patterns of arms and body movement. This is distinctive from the North American Salsa styles which is danced in a slot (two points) and linear positions as taught by the North American and European dance studios.

Casino has a number of basic steps. One of them, known as guapea (also known as pausa or swagger) among other attested names, involves the leader lead performing a more or less pronounced dragging of his left foot backward from a slightly advanced onset position. This is in stark contrast to the most common basic Salsa step, in which the lead steps forward with his left foot.

Casino styling includes men being "macho" and women being femininely sexy, with major body and muscle isolations, through the influence of Rumba dancing. During the dance, dancers often break from each other during percussion solos and perform the despelote, an advanced form of styling in which the male and female partner get physically close and tease each other without touching through the gyrating of hips and shoulders while performing muscle isolations.

The major distinction of Casino Styling is that male partners have tendencies to show off (following Afro-Cuban Guaguancó influence), under the cultural guise of males having to attract attention and tease females. This is the major point of differences between Casino and Northern American forms of Salsa, which ascribe to the ballroom adage of "men are the picture frame while women are the picture."

=== As a solo dance (Suellta) ===
Suellto, dancing salsa without a partner, originates from stage singers and dancers who perform dance routines during orchestra and live performances. Dancing alone or in a group (usually with a male facing females on the dance floor), the movements are based on a-tiempo or contra-tiempo, with intricate footwork and lively body movements.

=== Other forms of partner dancing ===
In the 1950s, Miami came alive with Cuban music and salsa dancing. It all started when waves of Cuban immigrants made Miami their new home after the Cuban Revolution. They brought their incredible musical traditions, like son, rumba, and cha-cha-cha, sparking a fiery dance culture we now call Miami Cuban-style salsa.

Other partner dancing styles include Trios or Quattros, in which a lead dances with two or more partners in intricate patterns. There is also a Trios version in which two leads share a follow. Additionally, several couples can come together to dance choreographed moves with changes of partners, led by a caller and known as "rueda de casino". This last form is popular everywhere there is Cuban music. In the United States, many dance schools only offer rueda de casino and ignore completely the dance of casino. These schools often mistakenly identify the dance as "casino rueda" or "salsa rueda", both incorrect terms.

== See also ==
- Rueda de Casino - a lively group formation of dancing casino
- Salsa (dance)
