= Modern Western square dance =

One of two American types of square dancing

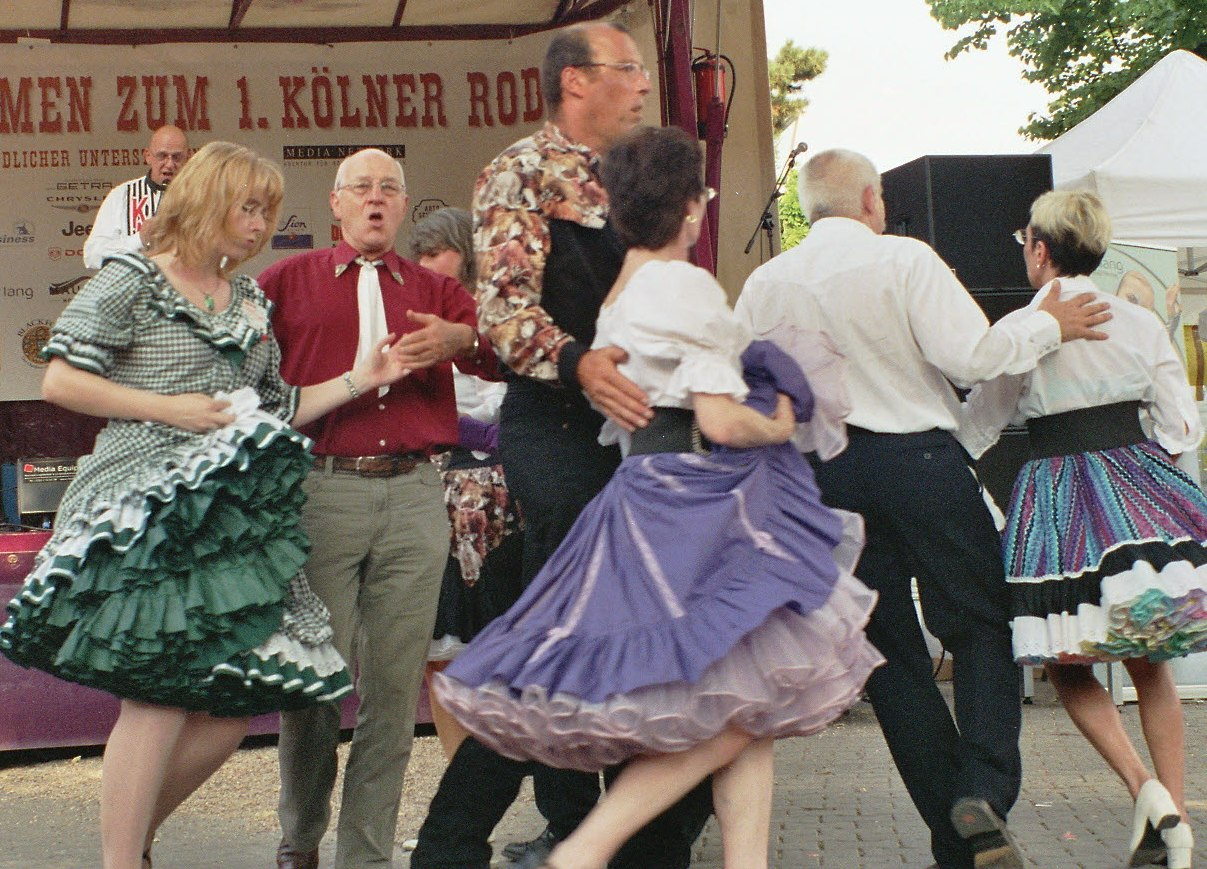
Western square dance group

Modern western square dance (also called western square dance, contemporary western square dance, modern American square dance or modern square dance) is one of two American types of square dancing, along with traditional square dance. As a dance form, modern western square dance grew out of traditional square dance in the American West. The term western square dance, for some, is synonymous with "cowboy dance" or traditional western square dance. Therefore, this article uses the term "modern western square dance" to describe the contemporary non-historical dance which grew out of the traditional dance. Square dancing was the national folk dance of the United States in 1982 and 1983.

Modern western square dance, like traditional square dance, is directed by a caller. In modern western square dance the caller strings together a sequence of individual square dance calls to make a figure or sequence. These calls are the building blocks of the choreography that is danced by the individuals – square dancers – in the squares. There are eight people (four pairs of males and females, traditionally) in each square; at a dance there may be many squares. Generally speaking, each of these squares dances independently of each other, with the exception of specialty or "gimmick" dances, where there might be some crossover of dancers from one square to another.

While traditional square dance uses live music, modern western square dancing is usually played from recordings. This allows more variety in music styles than in traditional square dance. The tempo is also more uniform than in traditional dancing, as the ideal modern western square dance tempo is 120–128 bpm. At this speed dancers take one step per beat of the music.

The square functions as a "dance team" for the duration of a square dance tip, a group of dances usually separated from the next tip by a pause during which the dancers regroup into new squares. A square dance tip is usually composed of a combination of patter calls and singing calls, the two types of square dance calls.

Modern western square dancing is a non-competitive activity. There are no dance competitions, and apart from fun events, no prizes are ever offered or sought for 'best dancer' or 'best square'. Particularly at the 'challenge' levels there is large degree of personal satisfaction to be gained from the problem solving element of completing a dance. At all levels the main elements are to enjoy the dance, and to exercise.

Modern western square dancing is found in many countries across the world. The main centers are where United States military servicemen spread the dance during the 1950s through 1980s. Modern square dancing is found in such diverse counties as Japan, Denmark, Sweden, the United Kingdom, Taiwan, Spain, Germany and Australia. The Callerlab organization has standardized dance calls, allowing dancers to dance anywhere in the world.

== Learning modern western square dance ==
Dancers learn the individual calls at sponsored square dance clubs classes, taught by square dance callers. Clubs also sponsor special social and dance evenings, as well as open square dances.

The individual calls are categorized as belonging to a particular dance program, or level of difficulty. Each dance program has a list of defined dance steps, which is associated with it. These lists of dance steps are managed, and universally recognized.

Callerlab, the International Association of Square Dance Callers, the largest international square dance association, manages the most universally accepted and recognized lists. There are four main levels, some of which are divided into sublevels: Mainstream, Plus, Advanced (2 sublevels), and Challenge (5 sublevels, the top two levels of which are not managed). In general, the first three levels are more physically active than the challenge level (often referred to as challenge square dance). Challenge square dance is more cerebral, and focuses on problem solving.

At the basic square dance levels, the dancer is introduced to many square dance calls. A few of the most fundamental and well-known calls are "do-si-do", "promenade", and "right and left grand". Among other things, the dancer is additionally trained to move smoothly and rhythmically, to appreciate timing, to execute the steps from many different positions and in many different formations, and to cooperate effectively with the others in their square so that they get the most out of their dance experience.

Starting at the advanced level, the square dancer is introduced to square dance concepts, an addition to a call which modifies it in some way. Concepts often generalize more basic notions of square dancing and are an important aspect of challenge square dance.

== Dancing modern western square dance ==
Each dance round, called a tip, typically consists of two dances. The first dance part is known as a hash call, which is characterized by its unstructured and often puzzling dance choreography. The music is usually instrumental and the calls are typically not sung, but rather rhythmically spoken. The second dance part of a square dance tip is a singing call. The dance instructions are sung as well as the lyrics during the long duration calls. The music are often popular songs and the calls are timed to fit. During a singing call the female dancers temporarily switch partners in a counter-clockwise order around the square until they return to their original partners. The caller restores the original order of the square both at the end of the hash and the singing call. The duration time of a tip may vary, but is usually between ten and twenty minutes. Between tips, dancers are generally encouraged to find other dance partners and form new squares for the next tip.

== Dress code ==
Modern western square dance has developed a "look" that has become known as "square dance attire". This style of dress developed when square dancing's popularity in the United States increased after World War II, and began soaring during the 1950s and early 1960s. Several factors may have helped influence the look that has become known as "square dance attire". These include the visibility and popularity of square dance performers such as Lloyd "Pappy" Shaw‘s traveling troupe of "teenage cowboy square dancers"; the way square dancing and the west were portrayed in western movies and early television; and the popular clothing styles of those times, for example poodle skirts.

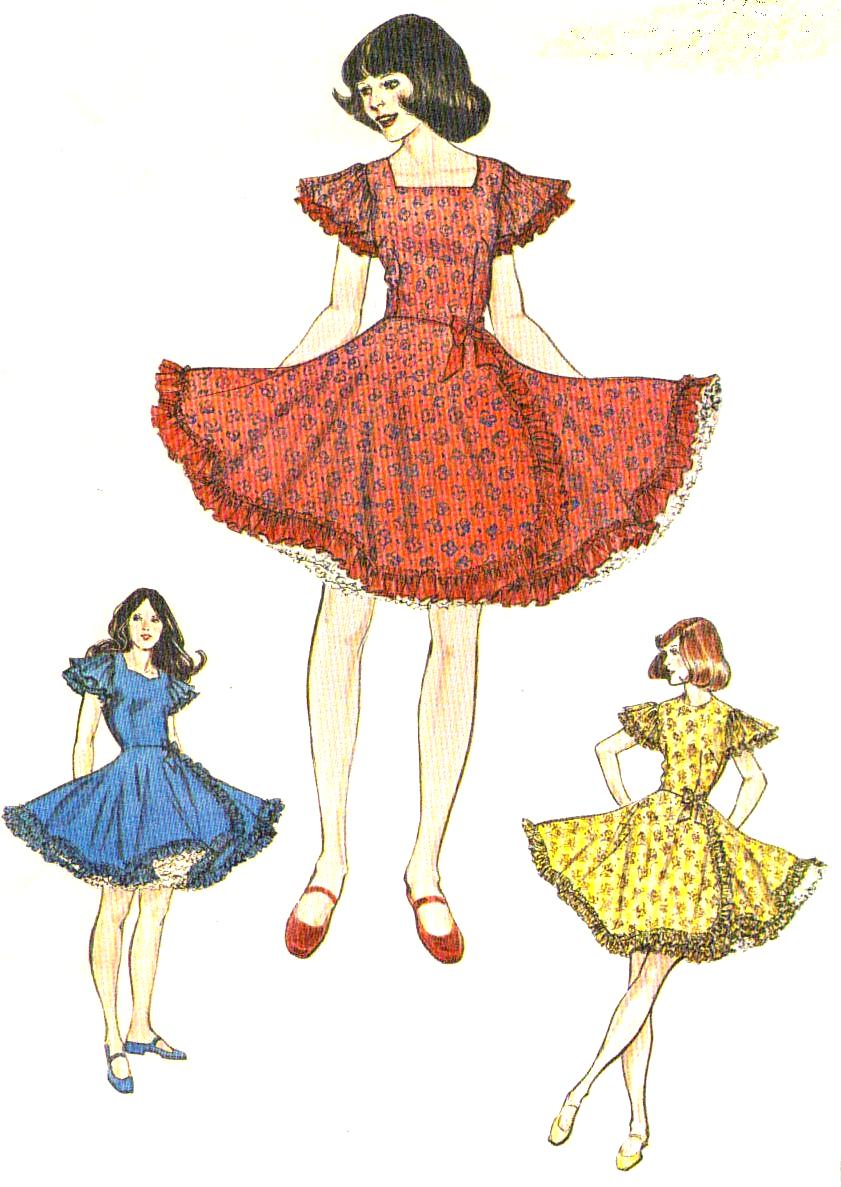
Traditionally-styled square dance dresses; note the full skirts and petticoats

At the non-challenge levels, particularly in North America, of modern western square dancing participants are often expected to wear western-style square dance outfits, or "square dance attire", especially at large dances. Over the years, there has been much discussion within square dancing circles about relaxing the dress code, and this has led to the adoption of alternative less restrictive attire designations— "proper" attire and "casual" attire. Clubs that sponsor dances are free to select a less restrictive dress code and are encouraged to advertise the dress code that is appropriate for their dance. Some clubs drop the "traditional" dress code requirement for classes and for their summer dances, and some, like challenge groups, gay square dance clubs and youth square dance clubs, have never had a dress code. Dress code is more relaxed in the UK than in North America, and to some extent than in Northern Europe.

Square dance attire for men includes long-sleeved western and western-style shirts, dress slacks, scarf or string ties (bolos) or kerchiefs, metal tips on shirt collars and boot tips, and sometimes cowboy hats and boots. It is very unusual to see hats and cowboy boots at dances in the UK.

Traditional square dance attire for women include gingham or polka-spotted dresses with wide skirts or a wide gingham or patterned skirt in a strong dark color with a white puff-sleeve blouse. Often dancers wear specially-made square dance outfits, with multiple layers of crinolines, petticoats, or pettipants.

Partners might have color- and pattern-coordinated outfits.

Both sexes might wear boots, but women most commonly wear soft-soled slippers or shoes with a single strap and low heel.

== Flourishes, sound effects, and games ==
There are many additions to or variations from standard square dancing, which have gained headway over the years. These are not universally recognized, and they are not all equally accepted or considered acceptable under all circumstances, or in all areas. Some of these are of local nature, and others are more widely known.

These variations fall into the following basic categories:

=== Flourishes ===
Flourishes are movements either in addition to or replacing the standard movement as defined. There are certain accepted flourishes in most communities, which may be limited to a club or geographic region, or be common among members of a group such as youth square dancers or gay square dancers. Common flourishes include replacing the dosado with a "highland fling" move, or twirling at the end of a promenade. Flourishes which are very common in a geographic area may be known informally as "regional styling differences". Flourishes are usually omitted with those just learning to dance, as they may obscure the standard movement. Occasionally flourishes provide an opportunity for dancers to interact with adjacent squares.

There is a lot of controversy about flourishes, including from some square dance leaders who feel that flourishes divert dancers from dancing according to the standard. Dancers may object to flourishes due to being unfamiliar, physically challenging, or inappropriate for the music. At higher dance levels, differences in body flow due to a flourish can interfere with proper execution of a call. For any of these reasons, dancers may ask that flourishes be limited while they are dancing.

=== Sound effects ===
Sound effects are standard responses to the caller. These include vocalized sounds, hand claps and foot stomps. Sound effects are generally well accepted, as they do not change either the timing or the execution of the step. The sound effects often serve as a mnemonic device, in that dancers associate the execution of the step with the particular sounds. A rhyming or punning word-play on the name of the call is common. For example, the response "Pink Lemonade" mirrors rhythmically and rhymes with the call "Triple Trade".

Problems with sound effects can occur when they make it difficult to hear the caller's cues, or are shouted too loud; however, in practice such situations are rare.

=== Games ===
Games refer to rule bending games that increase the difficulty of a dance. These include dancing with fewer than 8 people in the square, changing partners in the middle of a tip, and changing squares in the middle of a tip. Playing games without the permission of the entire square (and often the caller) can be considered extremely rude, and may confuse other squares as well. Games can, however, be an excellent tool for improving square dance skills, especially in class or club situations, and often have the function of allowing dancers who otherwise cannot form a complete square to participate in a dance. At the advanced and challenge levels, games include dancing phantom (missing one or more dancers), in a hexagon (6 couples in a square, consisting of three head couples and three side couples) or bigons (4 people, each of whom dances their own part and that of their opposite).

== History of modern western square dance ==
=== Traditional western square dance ===
Square dance originates from country dances practiced in Great Britain and Ireland dating as far back as the 17th century. Several of the dances included in the 1651 book The Dancing Master by John Playford are square dances. These dance styles were brought to the United States by European colonists in the 19th century. The distinctive call format of square dance was invented by black slaves, and when combined with European styles, evolved into traditional square dance, most popular in New England and the Appalachians. When people from these regions began settling the West, these evolved into the cowboy dance, a direct predecessor to modern western square dance.

=== Preserving the heritage ===
By the early twentieth century, square dance was declining in popularity, lacking a new generation of young dancers to continue the practice. Lloyd Pappy Shaw, wishing to preserve square dance, traveled the country to record the calls used at the time, and compiled the steps in his book Cowboy Dances.

Another heavy promoter of square dance was the industrialist Henry Ford. Ford believed that Jews invented jazz as a plot to corrupt society. Ford believed that this plot could be counteracted by returning America to dances and musical styles that he saw as traditional and white. As a result, he used his wealth to promote square dancing, through books and square dancing events. Ford also promoted square dance classes in public school, which were present in half of all American schools in 1928 as part of the standard physical education curriculum.

Modern western square dance evolved in square dance events funded by Ford, using direction and guidance prepared by Shaw.

=== The square dance boom ===
During the height of the square dance craze, there were multiple efforts to designate it as the national dance of the United States. Square dance proponents successfully designated square dance as the official dance of 28 states. The effort to designate it as a national dance began in 1965, with more than 30 bills introduced in Congress. This succeeded in 1982, when it was a bill passed by Congress and the Senate designated it a national dance from 1982 until it expired in 1983. This was criticized as preferring square dance over numerous other American styles of dance, as well as square dancing having no relevance to urban and minority populations in the United States.

Modern western square dance was brought to many countries through Square Dance clubs on American forces bases, where local community involvement often began to occur. This was particularly common in Britain where this legacy is seen with square dance clubs such as Alconbury Anglo-American SDC, originally based at RAF Alconbury, and Heyford Hoofers, originally at RAF Upper Heyford. The club based on the USA base in Tehran -The Tehran Twirlers - relocated briefly to RAF Alconbury following the 1979 Revolution in Iran.

=== Square dance's maturity ===
Since the 1960s, popularity of square dance has declined, as the square dance audience got older without young dancers to replace them. Square dance has also been gradually removed from public school curriculums.

In the 1970s, the Callerlab organization was established that standardized dance calls.

The 1970s and 1980s also found new audiences for square dance, most notably gay square dance and youth square dance.

Square Dancing in the UK has seen diminishing numbers of dancers since the 1990s as the activity has failed to attract sufficient numbers of younger dancers. There is a great deal of debate as to how to arrest this decline, or even if the decline should be addressed and accepted as inevitable. British dancers tend to be older people - this is in contrast to countries such as Denmark and Germany where there are flourishing numbers of teenage, student, and family dancers.

== See also ==
- Square dance (includes a comparison between traditional and modern western square dance)
- Challenge square dance
- Contra dance
- Gay square dance
- Square dance clubs
- Square dance program
- Western line dance
- Youth square dance
