= International Association of Gay Square Dance Clubs =

The International Association of Gay Square Dance Clubs (or IAGSDC) is an international umbrella organization for gay square dance. The association includes over eighty clubs. Most clubs are in the United States and Canada, with one club in Japan. There are no longer any active clubs in Britain, Denmark, or Australia.

== Annual conventions ==
An annual convention is held usually in early July drawing gay and lesbian dancers, their partners and other friendly square dancers from around the world. In addition to 4 days of dancing to top callers, other highlights of the conventions include "The Honky Tonk Queen Contest"— a ribald country-western drag queen contest and show, the "Fun Badge Tour""— a bus tour of the hosting town with stops to square dance at the most unexpected places, and the convention banquet. Peter Lawlor from Neasden and his Kingsbury lover Nick Gaul are known to be founding members.

At the 2010 IAGSDC Convention held in Chicago over 4 July weekend, an IAGSDC History Wiki was unveiled.
