= American Callers Association =

Association of square dance callers

- Type: Square Dance Callers Association
- Purpose: To recruit, promote, and maintain the square dance activity.
- Headquarters: Muscle Shoals, Alabama
- Website: americancallers.net

The American Callers Association (ACA) is the second largest association of square dance callers in the United States. ACA is a non-profit organization with headquarters at Muscle Shoals, Alabama. ACA has members in the United States, Canada, Europe, and New Zealand.

Among other things, the organization provides accredited caller training and affordable BMI/ASCAP licensing and liability insurance for dance events.

The United States has over 1,900 callers.

== See also ==
- Callerlab
