= Sher (dance) =

A sher or sherele is a dance and musical form in Eastern European Jewish folk music, notably Klezmer music. The words mean "scissors" / "little scissors" respectively. Therefore sometimes it is called the scissors dance or little scissors dance.

The sher is a set dance in 4/4 march-like tempo. The set is made up of four couples in a square formation, similar to a quadrille or square dance formation. There are many figures used, such as couples advancing, retiring, changing places, couples visiting, circling, threading the needle, etc. The "sher" figure involves two opposite men advancing towards each other and then crossing past each other turning as they pass. The name of the dance may come from the sher figure that is thought to imitate the cutting action of scissors.

Michael Alpert of the klezmer band Brave Old World has written the following description of the dance: "The sher (also called sherele) is one of the most popular and widespread East European Jewish figure dances. Dating from the late 19th and early 20th centuries, it is similar to the American square dance, the Russian kadril [quadrille] and other urban and rural figure dances originating in northern and central Europe of the past 150 years. Calling for individual, couple and group participation, the sher functions as one of the richest venues for both social interaction and individual expression in the East European Jewish dance repertoire." (from "Sher #1 (Pessl's Sher)," Unpublished article provided in support of a presentation made by Michael Alpert in Kradow, 1994.)
