= Square dance program =

A square dance program or square dance list is a set of defined square dance calls or dance steps which are associated with a level of difficulty. Programs and program lists are managed and universally recognized in modern western square dance.

Upper-level dance programs include not only square dance calls, but also square dance concepts.

== CALLERLAB’s program lists ==
CALLERLAB, the International Association of Square Dance Callers, the largest international square dance association manages the most universally recognized of these programs, and currently manages seven dance program lists. There are four main levels, some of which are divided into sublevels: Mainstream, Plus, Advanced (2 sub-levels), Challenge (5 sublevels, the top two levels of which are not managed).

In general, the first three levels are more physically active than the challenge level (often referred to as challenge square dance). Challenge square dance is more cerebral and focuses on problem-solving.

These program lists are not static, and there has always been some occasional adjustment of the programs. Today, the tendency is to reduce the number of steps at Mainstream, the lowest level, so that there is less required learning time to achieve a controlled common level of dancing proficiency.

CALLERLAB's seven managed dance program lists, as of Aug. 2005, are as follows. After the name of the program is an indication of the number of steps added at each level, and the total number of steps and concepts one is expected to know after having learned the level:

Dance level	# add'l calls (and concepts)	Total (including lower levels)
Mainstream	69 calls	
Plus	31 calls	100 calls
Advanced 1 (A-1)	46 calls and concepts	146 calls and concepts
Advanced 2 (A-2)	35 calls and concepts	181 calls and concepts
Challenge 1 (C1)	79 calls and concepts	260 calls and concepts
Challenge 2 (C2)	86 calls and concepts	346 calls and concepts
Challenge 3A (C3A)	83 calls and concepts	429 calls and concepts

Advanced 1 and Advanced 2 are officially one program ("Advanced"), in some regions they are treated as two separate programs.

CALLERLAB recognizes the first 53 calls of Mainstream as a separate program called "Basic".

Higher-level programs are not maintained by any official group, although the National Advanced and Challenge Convention maintained a C3B list until it disbanded in 2000. At the present, the C3B list is informally maintained by consensus of the callers of that program. At the C4 level callers are generally free to use any call or concept they please (subject only to the patience and knowledge of their dancers), but efforts are made to collect and standardize those calls and concepts used by practising callers. A C4 dancer typically knows about 1000 calls and 100 concepts. "Hard" C4 level dancing is sometimes informally called C5.

== Other program lists ==
There are also several lower-level programs promoted by groups other than Callerlab. For example, there is an alternative dance program managed by the American Callers Association, called the "1" floor dance program, which consists of 66 steps at present. This list includes some (but not all) calls from Callerlab’s Mainstream list, along with some from Callerlab’s Plus list. It intends to create a more accessible dance program.

Other groups of callers advocate even smaller lists to reduce the barrier to new people getting involved. Examples include the "ABC" approach which uses 22 calls, the "Club Level 50", and the Danish M23-M45-M53-M69 approach.

The U.S. Handicapable Square Dance Association has defined two lists for use at its conventions, one with 19 calls and a more advanced one with 44 calls.

== The purpose of programs and program lists ==
Having programs and program lists allows the caller to form his/her choreography from an agreed-upon and widely known list of calls that the dancers are understood to be able to carry out. Dancers can be assured that others who dance the same program know identical calls.

Having managed program lists allows modern western square dance to be an international activity.

When a dance is advertised as being a multi-program dance then there are either "tips" or special rooms available for the dancer at the various programs.

== See also ==
- Modern western square dance
