= Caller (dancing) =

Person who prompts dance figures

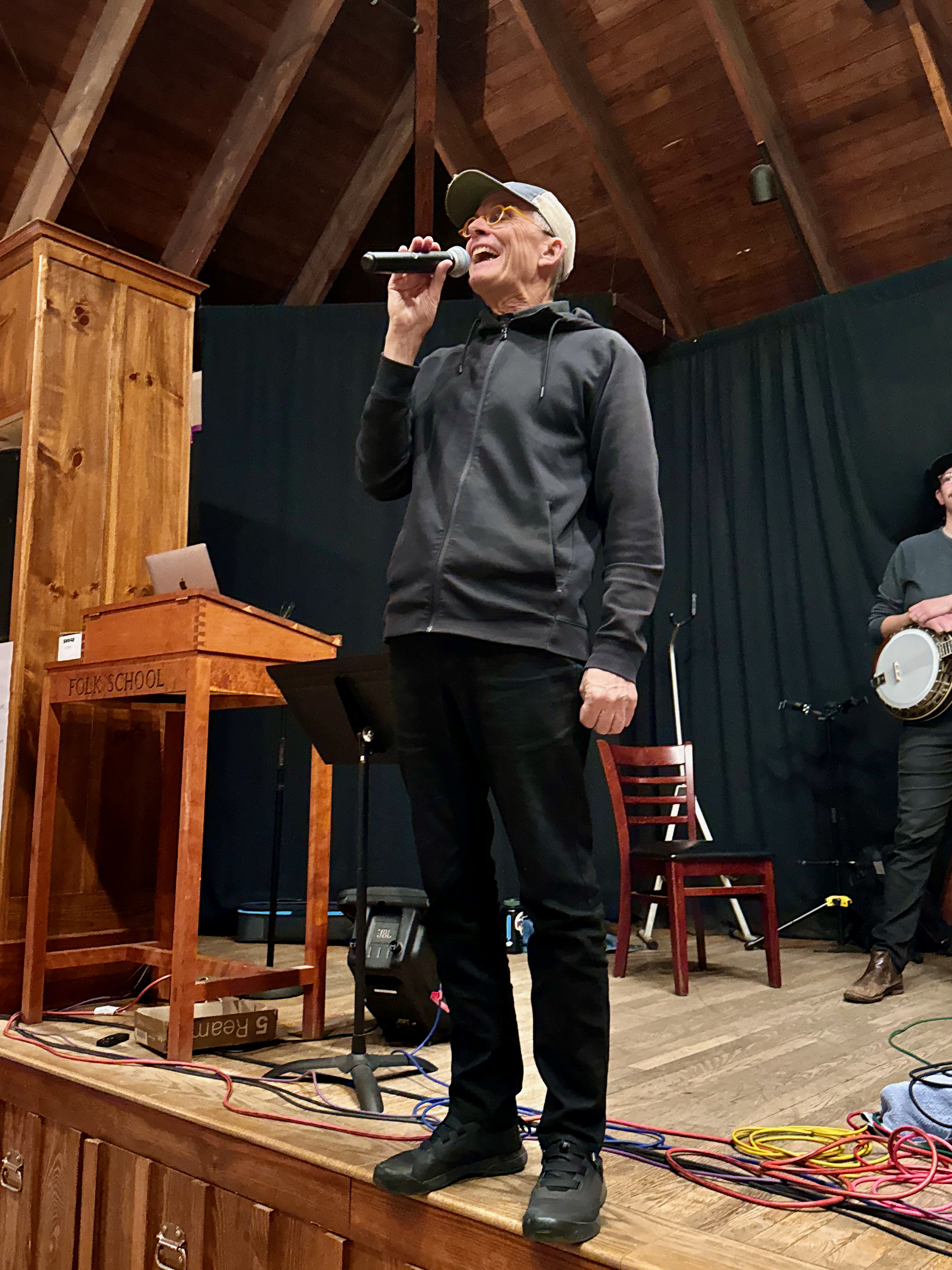
Will Mentor calls a square dance at the John C. Campbell Folk School in North Carolina.

A caller is a person who prompts dance figures in such dances as line dance, square dance, and contra dance. The caller might be one of the participating dancers, though in modern country dance this is rare.

In round dance a person who performs this function is called a cuer. Their role is fundamentally the same as a caller, in that they tell dancers what to do in a given dance, though they differ on several smaller points. In northern New England contra dancing, the caller is also known as the prompter.

== Comparing callers and cuers ==
Callers and cuers serve slightly different functions in different types of dance. Improvisation in modern Western square dance calling distinguishes it from the calling in many other types of dance.

Callers in many dance types are expected to sing and to be entertaining, but round dance cuers do not sing and are expected to be as unobtrusive as possible.

Standardized dances such as round dance, modern western square dance, and Salsa Rueda consist of a number of defined difficulty levels. Callers and cuers are responsible for knowing all of the calls or cues (respectively), also known as figures, for the defined difficulty level at which their dancers are dancing, as well as all figures belonging to lower or easier levels.

Callers for other types of dance may be required only to know the particular dance they are calling.

== Contra dance caller ==
Contra dance callers typically take on a role as the host of a contra dance event, stepping aside only briefly to let the organizers of the dance (who hired them and arranged logistics) make announcements (typically before the break). They are responsible for helping attendees find partners and organize themselves into contra lines, for teaching them the moves of the dance during a walkthrough, and for calling the moves during the dance until the dancers have it memorized. They also coordinate with the band to help them figure out which tunes to play, what the tempo should be, and how long to play a dance for.

== Modern western square dance caller ==
The role of a caller in modern western square dance is not only to provide the dance steps which all of the dancers on the floor should be able to follow, but also to provide entertainment through a combination of factors, including programming, showmanship, singing ability, and challenging choreography.

Part of the entertainment factor can come from the caller's use of "patter" — a set of rhyming words and rhythms that complement the names of the dance steps being called. Patter can not only be entertaining because it is innovative and surprising, but it can also fill in the space between lengthy dance patterns, helping boost up the energy during potentially dull moments.

There is a large, common pool of patter which callers might use. Examples are:

Allemande left with your left hand. / Back to the partner for a right and left grand.

or

Ace of diamonds, Jack of spades / Meet your partner and all promenade.

The square dance calls are underlined; all the rest is patter.

Many callers spend time inventing their own unique patter or variants on common patter.

Entertainment also comes from callers challenging the dancers on the floor. There are many techniques to accomplish this. This can be done choreographically, for example, by mixing dance calls in unexpected or unusual ways, by varying expected dance patterns, or by calling figures from unusual and unexpected formations. Callers might also use gimmicks such as calling a common and well-known sequence of calls, and then catching dancers off guard by suddenly changing an expected call.

Occasionally callers make mistakes, or forget what they are doing momentarily, in which case, it is important for them to be able to keep the dancers moving and to bring the dancers back to their partners, and home again, smoothly, and hopefully without anybody noticing.

=== Call types ===
There are two primary classifications of figure types in modern Western square dancing, patter and singing.

==== Patter calls ====
Patter calls, also known as hash calls, are based on a quick and fluid succession of spoken ("pattered") or sing-song delivered calls, often to the accompaniment of an instrumental piece of music that it is not necessarily recognizable as a song. Choreography may appear "on-the-fly" with calls randomly strung together, but it conforms to strict choreographic rules. Most patter calling is improvised by the caller as the dancers are moving; if the tempo of the calling is done at a fast pace allowing the dancers to flow from one move to another without pauses, it may be called hot hash.

The primary purpose of patter calls is to give dancers a challenge by surprising them with unexpected choreography.

Many callers are very well known for their ability to put calls together to create a unique, smooth-flowing dance. Some callers are also known for the unusual and interesting formations they move the dancers through.

==== Singing calls ====
Singing calls are based on a sung delivery of calls, most often to a recognizable melody, and square dance calls are mixed in with the song's original lyrics. Many widely recognized songs have been turned into singing calls. The primary purpose of singing calls is to help the dancers relax, dance well together as a group, and enjoy the song and the caller's performance.

Some callers are very well known for their voices, and for how well they can perform singing calls.

There is often a very specific format for singing calls. Most singing calls are structured in an A-B-B-A-B-B-A format, with each section consisting of 64 beats. The "A" sections (the beginning, middle and end "break" sections) often involve simple moves done in a circular fashion, with no partner change. The "B" sections, known as the "figures", are often, especially at the lower levels of dancing, identical, and produce a partner change. Usually this means that at the end of each "B" section each "lady" moves to the next "gent" to her right. At the end of the final B section, each "lady" has returned to her original partner. Variations are occasionally seen; for example, the ladies may move left instead of right, or the last "A" section may be omitted.

Singing calls, like patter calls, vary in dance difficulty, and are rarely improvised in full. They are uncommon above the Advanced program, although there are famous singing calls at the highest challenge levels.

=== Programming ===
A modern Western square dance tip is composed of a combination of patter calls and singing calls. Usually one patter call is followed by one singing call to make a tip, although this is not universal.

There are a number of ways that a caller programs the evening's entertainment. The caller might feature a particular music theme (such as a Rock and Roll party, or a Halloween festival), or might include variations of a particular dance call throughout the night.

Generally callers start the evening slowly to warm dancers up, and to give them chances to succeed during the first tip. Then tempo and difficulty increases and peaks for most of the evenings. At the end of the evening there is usually a slower dance number at the end to relax the dancers, and to let them wind down.

=== Training to call ===
Calling a modern Western square dance requires a number of different skills and some natural talent; becoming a caller requires training— both educational training and "in front of the microphone" practice.

Sometimes people who get the desire to call believe that it is enough to stand up on a platform, and sing the provided text to a square dance song, or call a pre-written sequence of patter. Difficult as even that can be for some, with some natural talent, a good ear for rhythm and timing, an engaging stage presence, and perhaps a robust singing voice, even a beginner can sound good.

A caller has two main roles:

- Teacher
- Dance caller

As a teacher, the caller must develop their educational skills, as well as the educational materials used in class. People skills are very important.

As a dance caller, the caller must prepare choreographic material, and must be able to deliver it, whether by memory, or by using written sequences, or by using sight calling. The choreographic material must conform to a strict, basic set of choreographic rules:

- Bring dancers back to their original partner
- Bring partners home
- And keep people dancing smoothly and enjoyably.

Caller training is available, and Callerlab certifies instructors.

== Round dance cuer ==
Round dance cuers recite rehearsed, pre-choreographed sequences of figures. Unlike callers in Salsa Rueda or modern western square dance, who invoke an execution of figures in an unexpected order that varies from one run of the dance to another, a round dance cuer only "cues", i.e., hints each subsequent figure of a predefined sequence, possibly already known to the dancers.

The cuer, rather than being expected to call out original, on-the-fly choreography, is expected to know many (sometimes lengthy) dances and lead the floor through each one by appropriately and clearly stating the name of each successive step in the dance just in time to hear it before the last step has finished. Often cuing is from cards which list the steps in abbreviated notation. Cuing each step with proper timing is often tricky, as some dance steps can have very long names ("through-side-close to sidecar" for example), and there are times when a series of quick steps have been placed together, which requires quick speech, while maintaining good diction.

Cuers are not expected (or even encouraged or suggested) to add patter. Rather, they speak more softly, and as quickly as possible to allow the dancers to enjoy as much of the song as possible. Cuers do not sing, either, except in rare occasions. Being more calm than most folk and country dances, round dance cuers are not expected to entertain; the act of dancing is the primary entertainment.

Cuers are expected to also know the steps they are cuing well enough to teach them. At most round dances, there are a few pieces that most people know, but it is a cuer's job to also introduce new dances and teach them. Especially in both very early levels and very advanced levels, it is important that cuers can teach the steps, as several dances are listed as "Phase 2 + 1", meaning that the majority of the steps are at phase two, but there is one step added in from another level.

== Salsa Rueda caller ==
In Salsa Rueda, hand signs are used to complement voice calls; these are useful in noisy venues, where spoken calls might not be easily heard.

== See also ==
- Traditional square dance
