= Square dance =

Dance for four couples arranged in a square

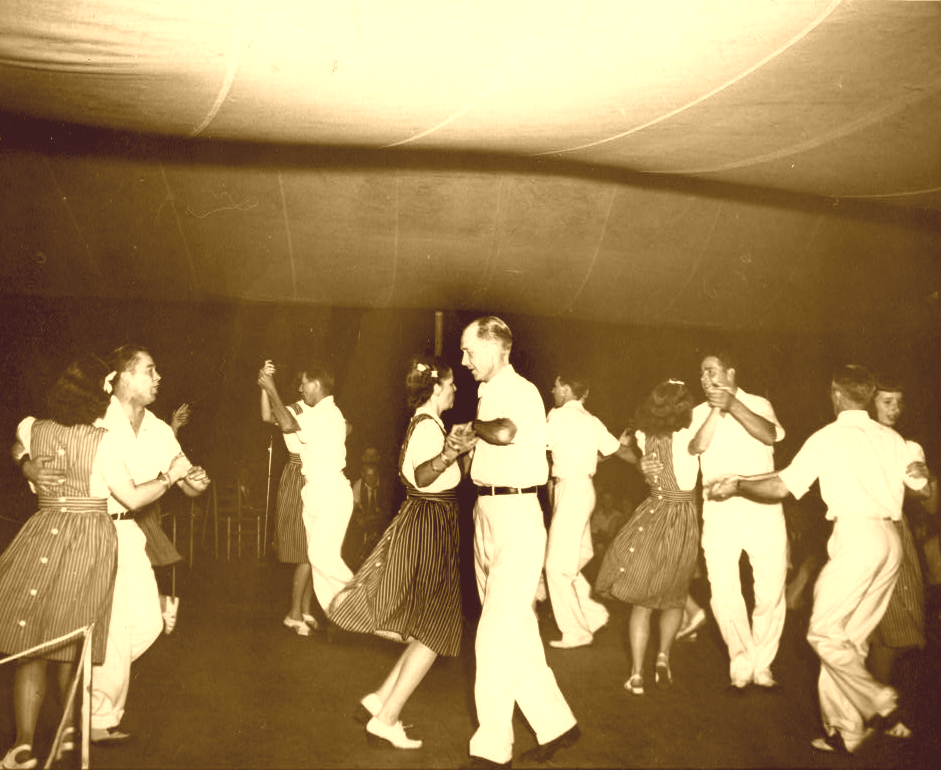
The Bent Creek Ranch Square Dance Team dancing at the Mountain Music Festival in Asheville, North Carolina.

A square dance is a dance for four couples, or eight dancers in total, arranged in a square, with one couple on each side, facing the middle of the square. Square dances are part of a broad spectrum of dances known by various names: country dances, traditional dances, folk dances, barn dances, ceilidh dances, contra dances, Playford dances, etc. These dances appear in over 100 different formations, of which the Square and the Longways Set are by far the most popular formations.

Square dances contain elements from numerous traditional dances including English country dances, which were first documented in 17th-century England, and 18th-century French quadrilles and cotillions; square dancing travelled to North America with the European settlers and developed significantly there.

Square dancing is done in many different styles all around the world. In some countries and regions, through preservation and repetition, square dances have attained the status of a folk dance. Square dancing is strongly associated with the United States, in part due to its association with the romanticized image of the American cowboy in the 20th century, and 31 states have designated it as their official state dance. The main North American types of square dances include traditional square dance and modern western square dance, which is widely known and danced worldwide. Other main types popular in England, Ireland, and Scotland include Playford dances, regional folk dances, ceili, Irish set dances, and Scottish country dances.

The couples in a square are numbered, although numbering varies among different types. In many of the types, two of the couples are known as heads and the other two are called sides. In most American forms of square dance, the dancers are prompted or cued through a sequence of steps by a caller to the beat (and, in some traditions, the phrasing) of music. In other variations, dancers have no caller and instead memorize and perform a specific routine and sequence of steps. Square dance music varies widely, with some forms using traditional tunes and others employing more modern types.

Dances can be organized by square dance clubs, bands, individuals, or similar organizations. Attire varies by type, with some forms possessing a specific dress code and others having no requirements. The standard square formation can also vary at times to include more or fewer dancers or arrange dancers in a different shape.

== History ==
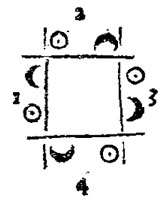
A square dance diagram from The English Dancing Master (First published in 1651)

The origins of Square dances can be traced back to steps and figures used in traditional folk dances and social dances from many countries. One of the earliest influences may have been the Morris dance, an English dance for six men involving a line formation and energetic steps. This dance is closely related to another ancestor of square dancing, English country dance, which included a variety of dances for groups of couples arranged in circles, lines, or squares. In 1651, John Playford published 105 of these dances in The English Dancing Master, eight of which are square dances exhibiting concepts still in use, such as the head couples performing an action and the side couples repeating it. Three of the dances, such as "Dull Sir John", specifically use the term square dance in the phrase, "A Square Dance for eight thus". In the early 1800s, English country dances merged with French dances to form the quadrille, a dance for four couples in a square.

These dances further evolved in America, where they arrived with European settlers. After the American Revolution, the quadrille became especially popular. Quadrilles were originally danced from memorized steps and sequences, but as African American slaves played music for the dances, they began calling out the steps. This practice became common by the early 1900s and gave rise to the modern caller. Between 1940 and 1960, modern western square dance evolved from the western style of traditional square dance that had formed in the United States. Traditional western square dancing was promoted beginning in the 1930s by Lloyd Shaw, who solicited definitions from callers across the country in order to preserve that dance form and make it available to other teachers. The American folk music revival in New York City in the 1950s was rooted in the resurgent interest in square dancing and folk dancing there in the 1940s, which gave musicians such as Pete Seeger popular exposure.

Starting in the 1970s, many U.S. states adopted square dance as their state dance, the result of a campaign by square dancers to make it the national dance.

== Main types ==
Square dances are considered folk dances in many countries and regions, although the term square dance varies. In the United States the term is used for dances in square formations and also refers to the dance events where square dances are performed. In England, Ireland, and Scotland, the term is used less frequently, and many dance events involve dances in square, circle, and line formations. The term has also become associated with barn dances, where many different formations of dance are used.

=== United States and Canada ===
==== Traditional square dance ====
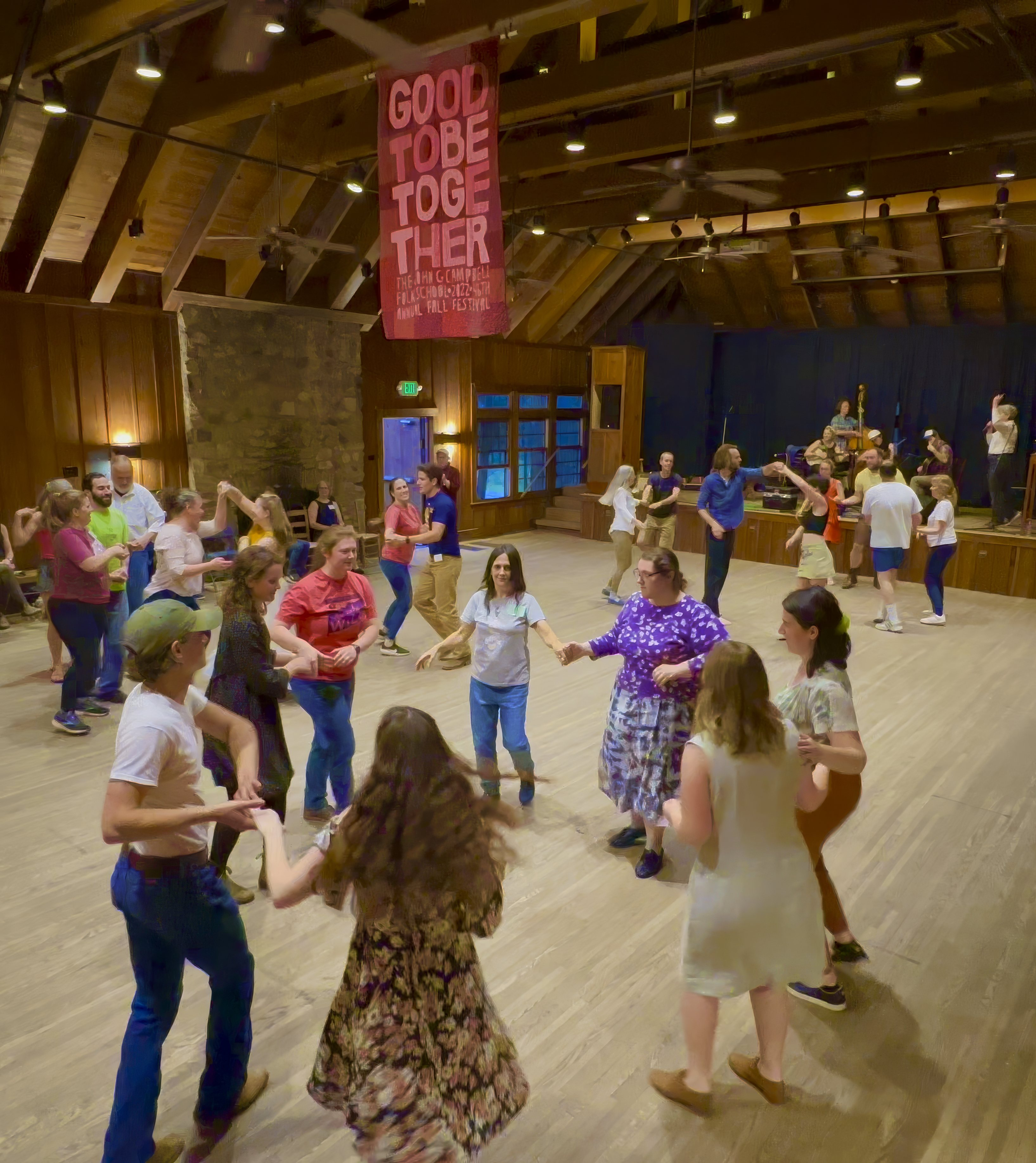
Appalachian square dancing at the John C. Campbell Folk School in Brasstown, North Carolina

Also called old-time square dance or quadrilles by some older New England callers in recognition of the dance it descended from, traditional square dance is not standardized and can be subdivided into three main regional styles: Northeast/New England, Southeast/Appalachian, and Western. The New England and Appalachian styles have been particularly well documented in the early U.S. and have survived to the 21st century. There are several other styles, some of which have survived or been revived while others have not. Where traditional square dance has been revived, it encompasses a wide range of new choreography.

Traditional square dance structure varies by region, but it usually consists of a limited number of calls occurring in a set order. Traditional square dance is frequently presented in alternation with contra dances, particularly in revival groups, or with some form of freestyle couple dancing at surviving local events.

==== Modern western square dance ====
Modern western square dance, which is also called western square dance, contemporary western square dance, or modern American square dance, evolved from the western style of traditional square dance.

Industrialist Henry Ford popularized the form, believing that Jews invented jazz as a plot to corrupt society and that this plot could be counteracted by returning America to dances and musical styles that he saw as traditional and white. As a result, beginning in the early 1920s, he used his wealth to promote square dancing, through books and square dancing events. Ford also promoted square dance classes in public school, which were present in half of all American schools by 1928 as part of the standard physical education curriculum. Modern western square dance evolved in square dance events funded by Ford, using direction and guidance prepared by Colorado school superintendent Lloyd "Pappy" Shaw.

Since the 1970s, modern western square dance has been promoted and standardized by Callerlab, the International Association of Square Dance Callers.

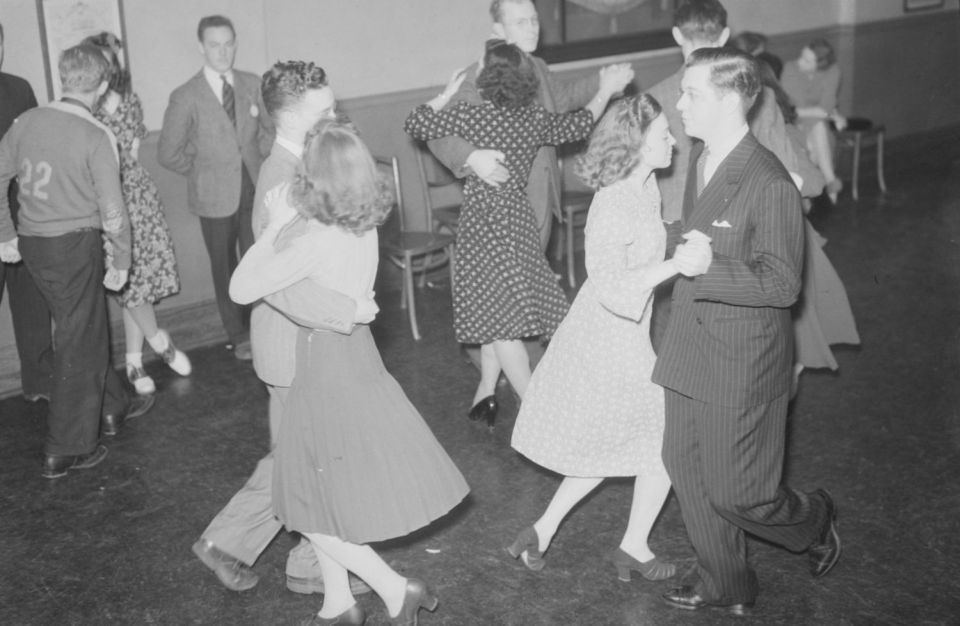
A square dance in Montreal, Quebec in 1941

The initial stage reached by all dancers is called Mainstream. This program consists of a core list of about 70 moves which is revised periodically. Modern western square dance is sometimes presented in alternation with round dances. This modern form of square dancing is taught in around 30 countries, including the United States, Canada, the United Kingdom, Australia, Belgium, France, Germany, Denmark, Sweden, Norway, Finland, Switzerland, the Netherlands, Australia, China, Japan, and Russia. Within Europe, the majority of square dance clubs are in Germany and the United Kingdom. All teach the Callerlab syllabus, but there are slight style and call title variations throughout the world. Because of this standardization, anyone with the proper training can dance modern western square dancing in many countries around the world. Instruction is typically given in the local language, but the calls are always in English, allowing people to dance internationally once they learn the calls.

=== United Kingdom and Ireland ===
==== Playford dances ====
Also called English country dances, Playford-style dances originated from the dances published in John Playford's book The English Dancing Master. Some of the square dances listed in the book, such as "Newcastle", have survived to the 21st century, and countless new dances have been written in the Playford style. These dances include a range of moves, from smooth, gentle steps to more energetic leaps. They are supported by the English Folk Dance and Song Society.

==== Regional folk dances ====
Many traditional English regional folk dances are square dances that have survived into the 21st century. For instance, in both the Goathland square eight and the Cumberland square eight, which originated from different English villages, dancers perform a series of memorized moves in a square formation. Many of these dances are danced at folk or barn dances, along with other types of square dances including Playford dances; dances derived from the quadrille, such as "La Russe" published by H.D. Willock in the Manual of Dancing (c. 1847); American traditional square dances; and countless new square dances written in the 20th and 21st centuries.

==== Ceili ====
Irish ceili dances cover a wide range of formations, including many square dances. They are often performed at traditional Irish and Scottish social gatherings called cèilidhs. Cèilidhs are also held in England, where the same squares may be done as at folk dances or barn dances but with more stepping, including skip steps, hop steps, polka steps, and rants.

==== Irish set dance ====
Irish set dance is a square dance with strong regional associations. The dance involves stepping, often with a flat-foot polka step. Unlike in traditional and modern western square dancing, where couples are designated as heads or sides, couples in Irish set dances are either tops or sides. It is traditional to have 4 couples dance together on the sides of a square.

==== Scottish country dance ====
Scottish country dances cover a wide range of formations, including many square dances. These dances, which are standardized by the Royal Scottish Country Dance Society, involve specific steps and formations that are performed in different sequences for different dances.

=== Continental Europe ===
Many traditions have square dances. They are usually not called; rather, the sequence of figures is fixed and known by the dancers. Examples include the German Bekedorfer, French Carré de Campagne, Mie Katoen from the Low Countries, and Eastern European Jewish Sher or Sherele. Variations include double squares, with two couples on each side, like the Danish Sonderborger Doppelkadril or the Dutch Vleegerd. Some are composed of multiple figures, indicating descent from the high-society quadrille.

== Numbering of couples ==
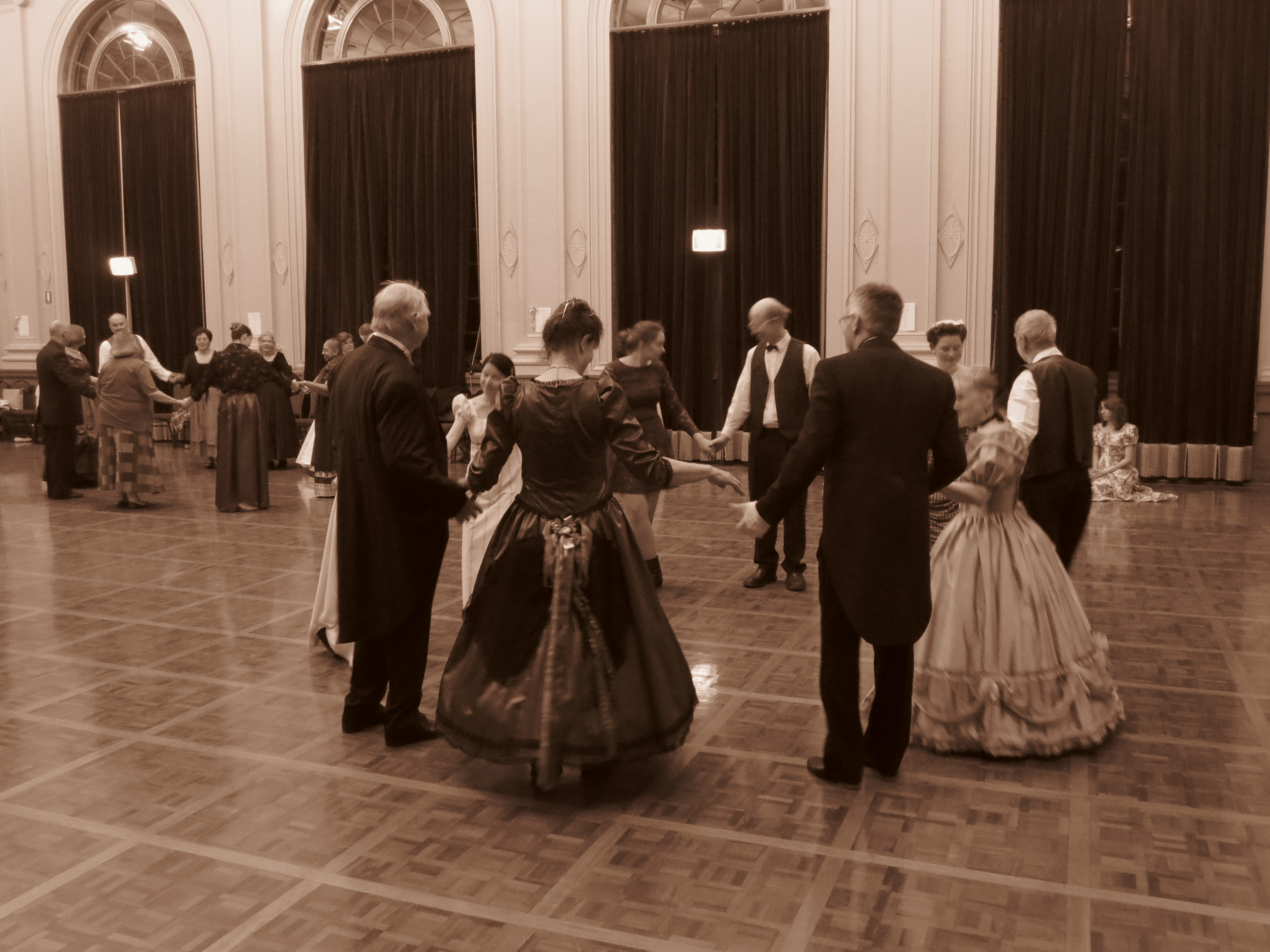
Quadrille variation involving five couples dancing at a Colonial Ball in the Albert Hall, Canberra September 2016 (sepia)

The four couples arranged in a square are called a set, and each couple is numbered. Couple numbering in a square dance set usually begins with the couple nearest the head of the hall (the side of the room containing the musicians and caller, or, in the pre-caller era, the royal presence or other hosts or important guests). This couple is the first or number one couple.

If most figures are danced around the set, with one or more couples visiting the others in turn, the couples are likewise numbered around the set. In most surviving American square dance traditions, the couples are numbered counterclockwise: the second couple is to the first couple's right, the third couple is across from the first, and the fourth couple is to the left of the first. The first and third are head couples or heads (or, in older parlance, the first four); the second and fourth are side couples or sides (formerly side four or second four).

If most of the figures are danced between facing couples across the set, as in the 19th century quadrille and dances derived from it, the couple opposite the first is the second couple. The first and second couples constitute the head or top couples (or the head and foot couples); the third and fourth couples are the side couples. In Irish set dances, the third couple (sometimes termed the first side couple) is to the left of the first top couple. The couples facing the first top and first side are the second top couple and the second side couple respectively.

== Callers and calls ==
Traditional square dance calls at a dance at Pinewoods Dance Camp

Square dance movements are known as calls, and some forms of the dance, such as traditional and modern western square dancing, use a caller to direct the dancers through different calls. In some forms of traditional square dancing, the caller may be one of the dancers or musicians, but in modern western square dancing, the caller is on stage giving full attention to directing the dancers.

A square dance call may take a very short time or a very long time to execute. Most calls require between 4 and 32 counts, where a count is roughly one step. In traditional square dancing, the timing of a call is dictated by tradition; in some regional styles, particularly that of New England, the dance movements are closely fitted to the phrases of the music. In modern western square dancing, many calls have been given formally specified durations, based partly on direct observation of how long it takes an average dancer to execute them.

Traditional and modern western square dance differ in the number of calls and their levels of standardization. Traditional square dance uses between ten and thirty calls, depending on the region and the individual caller. Many traditional square dance calls are similar or identical to contra dance calls, and new dance moves are explained by the caller. In modern western square dance, the participants learn and become proficient in a particular defined set of calls known as a program. The Mainstream program, which is the default level of achievement, consists of close to 70 basic and mainstream calls. Rather than learning a complete routine, modern western square dancers learn basic movements and calls but do not know in what order they will be called. Unlike traditional square dance, two modern western dances are rarely alike. Most modern western square dancers participate only in the programs they have fully learned. Callerlab, the callers' international association, sets all programs and governs the training of callers.

Traditional and modern western square dancing have a number of calls in common, but there are usually small differences in the way they are performed. For example, the Allemande Left is traditionally performed by grasping left hands with the other dancer, pulling away from each other slightly, and walking halfway around a central axis then stepping through. In modern western square dance, the grip is modified so that each dancer grips the forearm of the other, and there is no pulling (that is, each dancer supports his or her own weight). These modifications make it easier to enter and exit the movement and thus easier to incorporate it into a long sequence of calls.

In many communities, including Scotland and Ireland, and also continental Europe, the dancers know the complete dance and there is no caller.

== Music ==
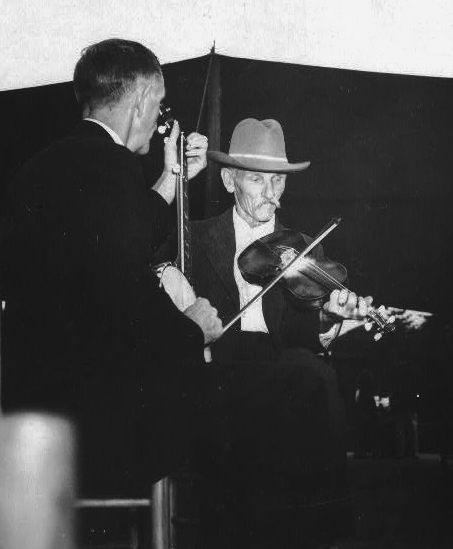
Old-time fiddlers often accompany traditional square dances.

Square dance music varies widely by type of dance.

Traditional square dance is primarily danced to live music. Since the 19th century, much of the square dance repertoire has been derived from jigs and reels from Scotland and Ireland, sometimes in relatively unaltered form, sometimes as played in the old-time music tradition or as adapted by other cultures, such as that of Quebec. This sort of music is played on acoustic instruments, such as the fiddle, banjo, guitar, and double bass; certain instruments, including the piano, accordion, concertina, and hammered dulcimer, are popular in specific regions. In some communities where square dancing has survived, the prevailing form of music has become popular songs from the 1930s, 1940s, and 1950s, played on instruments such as saxophones, drums, and electric guitars. Tempos can vary from around 108 to more than 150 beats per minute, depending on the regional style.

Modern western square dance is danced to a variety of music types, including pop, traditional and contemporary country music, songs from Broadway musicals, rock, Motown, techno, and hip-hop. The music is usually played from recordings, and the tempo is more uniform than in traditional square dancing, ranging from 120–128 beats per minute. At this speed, dancers take one step per beat of the music.

Irish and Scottish dances are normally done to traditional tunes. English dances may be done to traditional tunes, though there is experimentation with many different musical styles, especially at cèilidhs.

== Clubs and attire ==
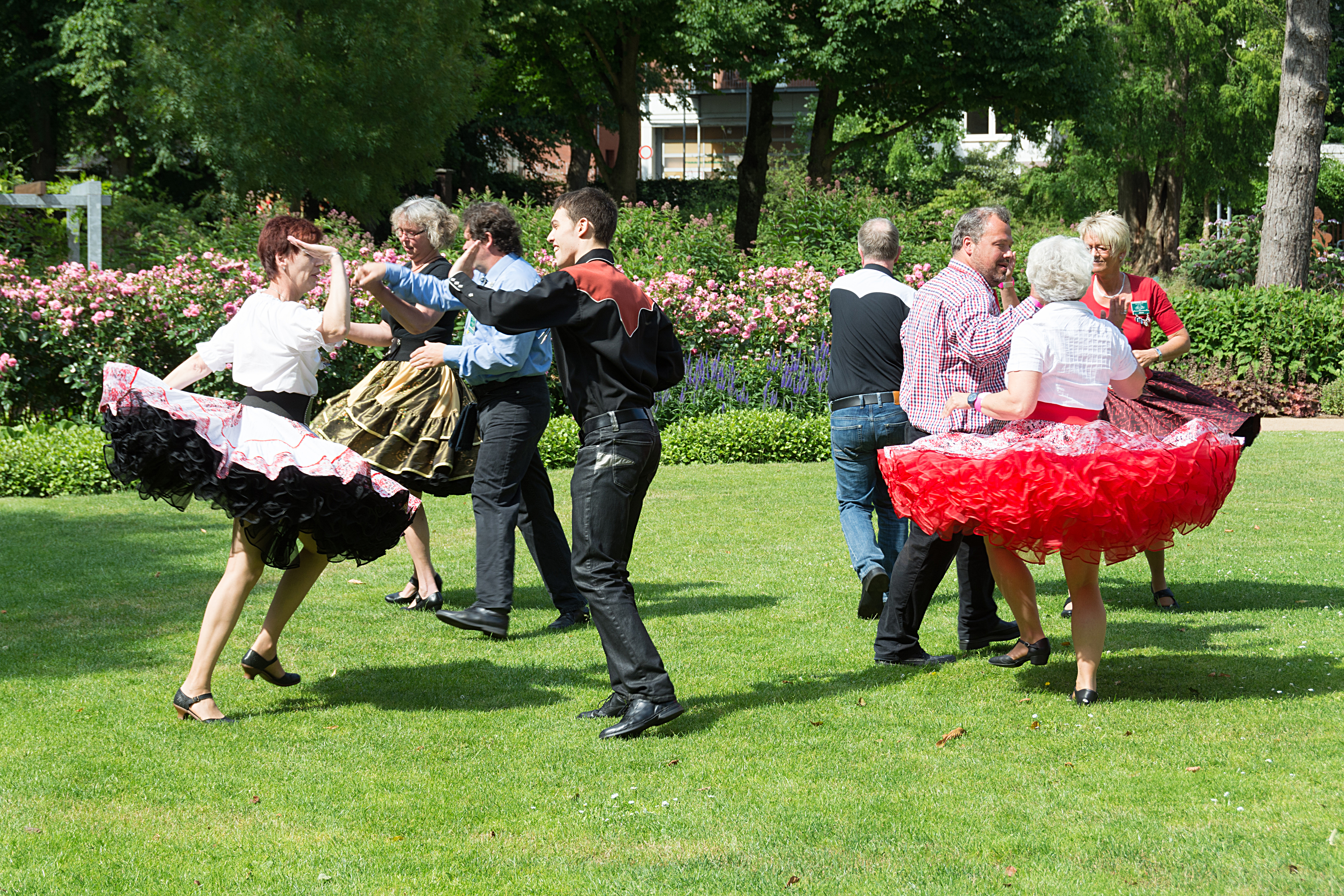
American-style square dancers performing outdoors in Schleswig-Holstein, Germany in 2014

Square dance events can be run in different ways. In North America, traditional square dances are organized by bands, callers, or small groups of dancers. Modern western square dances are arranged by square dance clubs. The clubs offer classes, socials, and dance evenings and arrange larger dances that are usually open to non-club members. In Britain, square dance clubs are affiliated with the British Association of American Square Dance Clubs, which also organizes the teaching of modern western square dance to Callerlab definitions. Most square dance events in Britain are run according to the Callerlab syllabus by a caller who is either a member of Callerlab or of the Square Dance Callers Club of Great Britain, and the level of dancing is indicated on the publicity material, as in "Mainstream" or "Mainstream with Pre-Announced Plus". Céilidh and barn dance events are also often advertised as being square dance events.

Square dance attire varies by the type of dance and by region. Traditional square dance groups often have no particular dress code. In the United States, larger modern western square dance events sometimes request a strict western-style dress code, which originated in the late 1950s and early 1960s and is known as traditional square dance attire, although it was not traditional before that time. Some clubs require a less strict dress code, known as proper, or no dress code, called casual. Although many modern western square dancers in Britain wear traditional square dance attire, events often have a relaxed dress code. Where traditional square dancing exists as a community social dance, sometimes in the form of a barn dance or a cèilidh, people often dress up, though their clothing is not square-dance-specific.

In the United States, lines between the forms of square dancing have become blurred. Traditional-revival groups typically adopt very casual dress, and traditional-revival choreographers have begun to use basic movements that were invented for modern western square dance forms. A few modern western callers incorporate older dances from various traditions, such as New England or Appalachian, into their programs.

== Variations ==
Square dance in Gjoa Haven, northern Canada

While the standard formation for a square dance is four couples in a square, there are many variations on the theme. These include:

- Ninepins: a square with one extra person in the middle.
- Winter Solstice: a square with one extra couple in the middle.
- Hexitation: a square with two couples in each of the head positions.
- Twelve Reel: a square with three people on each side, normally a man with a woman on either side of him.
- Hexagon dancing: six couples arranged in a hexagon. There are three head couples and three side couples. This variation is most commonly done by advanced and challenge-level dancers.
- Bigon: a square with four people who each dances their own part and that of their opposite. This variation is almost exclusively done by challenge-level dancers due to its difficulty.

Modern choreography also includes dances which morph from one form to another. There are contra dances and four-couple longways sets which turn into a square dance part of the way through the dance and then back to the original formation.

Grid squares are dances where the squares are arranged in a grid, with sets carefully aligned across the room and up and down the room. The calls move dancers from one square to another in intricate patterns.

== See also ==
- American folk dance
- Youth square dance
- Hoedown
