= Callerlab =

Square dance caller organization

- Founded: 1974
- Type: Square Dance Callers Association
- Headquarters: Greenwood, Indiana
- Website: callerlab.org

CALLERLAB is the international association of square dance callers, and is the largest square dance association in the United States. CALLERLAB provides guidance and education, certifying caller coaches, maintaining standardized lists of calls and definitions, and generally promoting the square dance activity. After some initial work started in 1971, it was officially established in 1974 by several members of the Square Dance Hall of Fame. Callerlab makes it so people can dance anywhere in the world with uniform dance calls.

Callers from all over the world, including Saudi Arabia, Japan, Germany, and England, are members of the organization, which hosts and annual convention.

The average age of Callerlab members is 65.

== Functions ==
- Maintains a suggested list of dancing programs, from Mainstream through C-3A. Each program contains a list of standardized square dance calls and concepts, with official definitions.
- Provides BMI/ASCAP licensing to its members
- Provides liability insurance for dance events

== Dance calls ==
Some calls that Callerlab uses for their dances are as follows;

- Cast Off 1/4, 1/2
- Cast Off 3/4
- Centers In
- Cloverleaf
- Dixie Style to an Ocean Wave
- Eight Chain Thru / Eight Chain 1, 2, 3, etc.
- Face In/out
- Fold / Cross Fold
- Half Tag
- Pass to the Center
- Recycle (from a wave only)
- Scoot Back
- Single Hinge / Couples Hinge
- Slide Thru
- Spin Chain Thru
- Spin the Top
- Tag the Line (In/out/Left/Right)
- Turn Thru
- Walk And Dodge
