= Angloise =

Angloise (archaic French, 'English') may refer to:

- English language
- Angloise, another name for the Anglaise dance
- "Angloise" (Leopold Mozart), a piece of classical music

== See also ==
- English (disambiguation)
- Anglais (disambiguation)
- Contenance angloise ('English manner), a style of polyphony
