= Ebert =

Ebert is a surname of German origin. Notable people with the surname include:

- Alex Ebert (born 1978), lead singer for the band Ima Robot
- Anton Ebert (1845–1896), Austrian painter
- Beanie Ebert (1902–1980), American football player
- Blanche Ebert Seaver (1891–1994), American philanthropist and musician
- Brad Ebert (born 1990), Australian football player
- Brett Ebert (born 1983), Australian football player
- Burkhard Ebert (1942–2025), German cyclist
- Carl Ebert (1887–1980), opera manager and director
- Carl Ebert (painter) (1821–1885), German landscape painter
- Cornelia Ebert (born 1976), German linguist
- Friedrich Adolf Ebert (1791–1834), German bibliographer and librarian
- Friedrich Ebert (1871–1925), German politician and President of Germany
- Friedrich Ebert Jr. (1894–1979), German politician
- Gabriel Ebert (born 1988), American actor
- Hermann Ebert (1861–1913), German physicist
- Jakob Ebert (1549–1614), German theologian and poet
- Johann Arnold Ebert (1723–1795), German writer and translator
- Johann Jakob Ebert (1737–1805), German mathematician and author
- Karl Ebert (1916–1974), Catholic theologian and auxiliary bishop
- Karl Egon Ebert (1801–1882), Bohemian German poet
- Lily Ebert (1923–2024), British writer and Holocaust survivor
- Patrick Ebert (born 1987), German footballer
- Roger Ebert (1942–2013), American film critic
- Russell Ebert (1949–2021), Australian football player
- Ute Ebert, German and Dutch physicist
- Ebert (footballer) (born 1993), Ebert Cardoso da Silva, Brazilian footballer

== See also ==
- Eberts (disambiguation)
