= Johann Ebert =

Johann Ebert may refer to:

- Johann Arnold Ebert (1723–1795), German writer and translator
- Johann Jakob Ebert (1737–1805), German mathematician, astronomer, poet and author
