= Heinrich Christoph Koch =

German musicologist and composer

Heinrich Christoph Koch (10 October 1749 – 19 March 1816) was a German music theorist, musical lexicographer and composer. In his lifetime, his music dictionary was widely distributed in Germany and Denmark; today his theory of form and syntax is used to analyse music of the 18th and 19th centuries.

== Life ==
Koch was born in Rudolstadt, in the federal state of Thüringen. In his youth, he was a violinist in the Rudolstadt court orchestra and from 1772 as a chamber musician. He was taught music by his father - a valet to Johann Friedrich von Schwarzburg-Rudolstadt, prince of the small state of Schwarzburg-Rudolstadt; later he was tutored in violin and composition by Christian Gotthelf Scheinpflug, the prince's band leader. Although his lowly circumstances precluded a university education, the prince - and his successors - encouraged his musical training and sent him to different German cities. He studied for periods in Weimar (with Carl Andreas Göpfert), Leipzig, Dresden, Berlin and Hamburg. After that, he spent the rest of his life in Rudolstadt. In 1792, he was appointed Kapellmeister (effectively director of music) by von Schwarzburg-Rudolstadt; this post was formerly held by his tutor, Scheinpflug. He returned to being a violinist after a year, then became active as a composer and writer on music. He composed various works to celebrate court occasions.

Apart from the musical examples in his theoretical works, Koch's compositional works have been lost, including cantatas, a Singspiel, instrumental and church music. The inventory of the court orchestra in the Thuringian State Archives, Rudolstadt, contains seven symphonies by "Koch". Although these are not included in contemporary lists of works, Koch uses the exposition of the first movement of one of these symphonies without author specification as a sheet music example (from his book Versuch einer Anleitung zur Komposition [Attempt at a Guide to Composition], third and last part, p. 386), which could be taken as an indication of his authorship. However, he became best known for his published works on musical theory and his Musiklexikon [Music Dictionary] (1802), which was the most influential since that of Johann Gottfried Walther (1732) and prior to the encyclopedias of Gustav Schilling (1835–38) and Hermann Mendel & August Reissmann (1870–83); it summarised the body of knowledge of the Baroque period and early Classical period. Versuch einer Anleitung zur Komposition was the first book to deal with the systematic and detailed structure of harmony, melody and musical syntax, making it the most important forerunner of Hugo Riemann's alternative theories. His theoretical work continues to be the subject of modern analysis.

In 1818, he was elected a member of the Royal Swedish Academy of Music with the award of a diploma; the academy was, however, unaware of his death two years previously.

== Publications ==
- Koch, Heinrich Christoph (1969). Versuch einer Anleitung zur Komposition [Attempt to guide into composition] mit einem vollständigen Register zu allen drei Bänden. Vol. 1–3 (reprint ed.). Hildesheim: Olms.
- Koch, Heinrich Christoph (2007). Siebert, Jo Wilhelm (ed.). Versuch einer Anleitung zur Komposition. Music-theoretical sources 1750-1800. Vol. DVD 1 (facsimile and study ed.). Berlin: Direct Media. ISBN 978-3-89853-615-8.
- Koch, Heinrich Christoph (1782). Abtheilung 1: Von der Art und Weise wie Töne an und für sich betrachtet harmonisch verbunden werden, und Abtheilung 2: Vom Contrapuncte [Part 1: On the way in which tones considered in and of themselves are harmoniously combined, and Part 2: On counterpoint]. Versuch einer Anleitung zur Komposition [Attempt to guide into composition]. Vol. 1. Leipzig: Adam Friedrich Böhme. pp. 1–236, 237–374.
- Koch, Heinrich Christoph (1787). Von der Art wie die Melodie in Rücksicht der mechanischen Regeln verbunden wird [On the manner in which melody is combined in respect of the mechanical rules]. Versuch einer Anleitung zur Komposition [Attempt to guide into composition]. Vol. 2. Leipzig: Adam Friedrich Böhme.
- Koch, Heinrich Christoph (1793). Fortsetzung Von den mechanischen Regeln der Melodie: Von der Verbindung der melodischen Theile, oder von dem Baue der Perioden [Continuation of the mechanical rules of melody: on the combination of the melodic parts, or of the structure of the periods]. Versuch einer Anleitung zur Komposition [Attempt to guide into composition]. Vol. 3. Leipzig: Adam Friedrich Böhme.
- Journal der Tonkunst [Journal of Musical Art] Erfurt 1795
- Musikalisches Lexikon, welches die theoretische und praktische Tonkunst, encyclopädisch bearbeitet, alle alten und neuen Kunstwörter erklärt, und die alten und neuen Instrumente beschrieben, enthält [Musical lexicon, which contains the theoretical and practical art of music, edited encyclopaedically, explaining all old and new words of the art, and describing the old and new instruments]. Frankfurt 1802
- Kurzgefasstes Handwörterbuch der Musik für praktische Tonkünstler und für Dilettanten [Concise hand dictionary of music for practical musicians and for amateurs]. Leipzig 1807.
- Über den technischen Ausdruck: Tempo rubato [About the technical term 'tempo rubato']. 'Allgemeine musikalische Zeitung' vol. 10, 1808, pages 513-519.
- Handbuch bey dem Studium der Harmonie [Handbook on the study of harmony]. Leipzig 1811.
- Versuch, aus der harten und weichen Tonart jeder Tonstufe der diatonisch-chromatischen Leiter vermittels des enharmonischen Tonwechsels in die Dur- und Molltonart der übrigen Stufen auszuweichen [Attempt to avoid the hard and soft key of each pitch of the diatonic-chromatic scale by means of the enharmonic tone change into the major and minor keys of the other degrees]. Rudolstadt 1812.

== Bibliography ==
- Hugo Riemann: H. Chr. Koch als Erläuterer unregelmässigen Themenaufbaues. In: Präludien und Studien, Bd. 2 (Leipzig, 1900), pp 56–70.
- Nancy Kovaleff Baker: From „Teil“ to „Tonstück“: the Significance of the „Versuch einer Anleitung zur Composition“ by Heinrich Christoph Koch. (Diss., Yale U., 1975); Auszüge in: Journal of Music Theory 20, 1976, pp 1–48, IRASM 8, 1977, pp 183–209 und Studi musicali 9, 1980, pp 303–316.
- Carl Dahlhaus: Der rhetorische Formbegriff H.Chr. Kochs und die Theorie der Sonatenform. In: Archiv für Musikwissenschaft. 35, 1978, pp 155–177.
- Gerhard Schuhmacher (1980). "Koch, Heinrich Christoph". Neue Deutsche Biographie (in German). Vol. 12. Berlin: Duncker & Humblot. pp. 263–264. (full text online).
- Elaine Sisman: Small and Expanded Forms: Koch’s Model and Haydn’s Music. In: Musical Quarterly 68, 1982, pp 444–475.
- Wolfgang Budday: Grundlagen musikalischer Formen der Wiener Klassik: an Hand der zeitgenössischen Theorie von Joseph Riepel und Heinrich Christoph Koch dargestellt an Menuetten und Sonatensätzen (1750–1790). Basel 1983.
- Shelly Davis: H.C. Koch, the Classic Concerto, and the Sonata-Form Retransition. In: Journal of Musicology 2, 1983, pp 45–61.
- Ian M. Bent: The "Compositional Process" in Music Theory 1713–1850. In: Music Analysis 3, 1984, pp 29–55.
- Günther Wagner: Anmerkungen zur Formtheorie Heinrich Christoph Kochs. In: Archiv für Musikwissenschaft 41, Nr. 2, 1984, pp 86–112.
- Nancy Kovaleff Baker: Der Urstoff der Musik: Implications for Harmony and Melody in the Theory of Heinrich Koch. In: Music Analysis 7, 1988, pp 3–30.
- Carl Dahlhaus: Logik, Grammatik und Syntax der Musik bei Heinrich Christoph Koch. In: J. Fricke [u. a.] (Hrsg.): Die Sprache der Musik: Festschrift Klaus Wolfgang Niemöller. Regensburg 1989, pp 99–109.
- Ivan F. Waldbauer: Riemann’s Periodization Revisited and Revised. In: Journal of Music Theory 33, 1989, pp 333–391.
- Joel Lester: Compositional Theory in the Eighteenth Century. Cambridge (MA) 1992.
- Walther Dürr: Music as an Analogue of Speech: Musical Syntax in the Writings of Heinrich Christoph Koch and in the Works of Schubert. In: M. Parker (Hrsg.): Eighteenth-Century Music in Theory and Practice: Essays in Honor of Alfred Mann. Stuyvesant (NY) 1994, pp 227–240.
- Nancy Kovaleff Baker, Thomas Christensen (Hrsg.): Aesthetics and the Art of Musical Composition in the German Enlightenment: Selected Writings of Johann G. Sulzer and Heinrich C. Koch. London 1995.
- Musiktheoretische Quellen 1750-1800. Gedruckte Schriften von J. Riepel, H. Chr. Koch, J. F. Daube und J. A. Scheibe, hrsg. von Ulrich Kaiser, mit einem Vorwort und einer Bibliographie von Stefan Eckert und Ulrich Kaiser, Berlin 2007.
- Felix Diergarten: "At times even Homer nodds off". Heinrich Christoph Koch’s polemic against Joseph Haydn. In: Music Theory Online 14.1 (2008)
- Felix Steiner: Heinrich Christoph Kochs Versuch einer Anleitung zur Composition im Spiegel der zeitgenössischen Kompositionslehren. Mainz 2016. DNB Deutsche National Bibliothek
