= Orbital part =

Orbital part may refer to:

- Orbital part of frontal bone
- Orbital part of inferior frontal gyrus
