= Katharine Abraham =

American economist (born 1954)

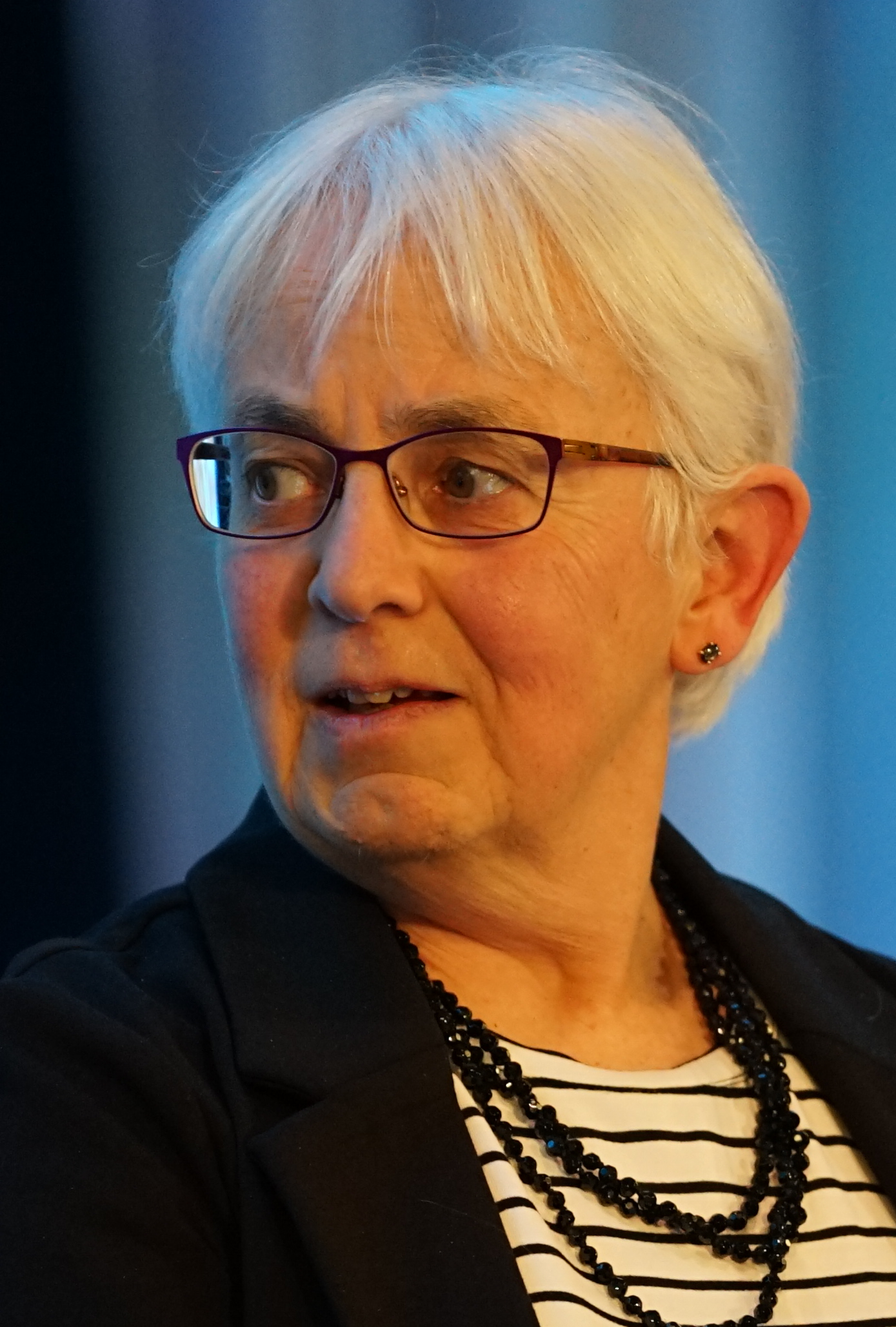
- Abraham at ASSA 2026

Commissioner of Labor Statistics Bureau of Labor Statistics
- In office October 1993 – October 2001
- President: Bill Clinton; George W. Bush
- Preceded by: Janet L. Norwood
- Succeeded by: Kathleen Utgoff

Member of the Council of Economic Advisers
- In office 2011–2013
- President: Barack Obama
- Preceded by: Cecilia Rouse
- Succeeded by: Betsey Stevenson

Personal details
- Born: August 28, 1954 (age 72) Dayton, Ohio, U.S.
- Spouse: Graham N. Horkley
- Children: 2

Academic background
- Education: Iowa State University (BA); Harvard University (PhD)

Academic work
- Discipline: labor economics
- Institutions: Sloan School of Management, MIT; University of Maryland, College Park
- Awards: Julius Shiskin Award for Economic Statistics (2002); Roger Herriot Award for Innovation in Federal Statistics (2010); Susan C. Eaton Scholar-Practitioner Award of the Labor and Employment Relations Association (2013); Distinguished Fellow of the American Economic Association (2020)

Katharine G. Abraham (born August 28, 1954) is an American economist who is a Distinguished University Professor of economics and survey methodology at the University of Maryland. She was commissioner of the Bureau of Labor Statistics from 1993 to 2001 and a member of the Council of Economic Advisers from 2011 to 2013. She was elected a member of the National Academy of Sciences in 2022 and, in 2024, was elected to be the President of the American Economic Association.

== Education ==
Abraham holds a Bachelor of Science degree in economics from Iowa State University (1976) and a Ph.D. in economics from Harvard University (1982).

== Career ==
Abraham was an assistant professor at MIT's Sloan School of Management and a research associate at the Brookings Institution before joining the faculty at the University of Maryland in 1988.

During her time as commissioner of the Bureau of Labor Statistics, Abraham laid the groundwork for the American Time Use Survey, the first U.S. government survey of time use; obtained funding to launch the Job Openings and Labor Turnover Survey; and established the Federal Economic Statistics Advisory Committee. During extensive public debate on the Consumer Price Index in the 1990s, Abraham testified repeatedly before Congress on the shortcomings of existing methodology and the necessity of making revisions based on objective research. She expanded coverage of the prices of services in the Producer Price Index; instituted improvements in the Current Employment Statistics program, including the substitution of a probability sample for the quota sample; accelerated delivery of employment and wage statistics; and took steps toward expanding coverage of wages and salaries in the Occupational Employment Statistics program.

In 2016–2017, Abraham served as Chair of the Commission on Evidence Based Policymaking. Many of the commission's recommendations were enacted into law as part of the Foundations for Evidence-Based Policymaking Act of 2018 (the Evidence Act).

Abraham's research has included studies on unemployment, job vacancies, wages and the business cycle; comparisons among the U.S., European, and Japanese labor markets; work-sharing policies; the operation of internal labor markets; the gig economy; and the measurement of market and nonmarket economic activity.

== Awards ==
Abraham is a research associate of the National Bureau of Economic Research and the recipient of an honorary doctorate from Iowa State University. She has been awarded the Julius Shiskin Award for Economic Statistics (2002), the Roger Herriot Award for Innovation in Federal Statistics (2010), the Susan C. Eaton Scholar-Practitioner Award of the Labor and Employment Relations Association (2013), and was named a Distinguished Fellow of the American Economic Association in 2020. She is a fellow of the American Statistical Association and the Society of Labor Economists. She was elected to fellowship of the American Academy of Arts and Sciences in 2020.

== Selected bibliography ==
Books

- Abraham, Katharine G.; McKersie, Robert B. (1990). New developments in the labor market: toward a new institutional paradigm. Cambridge, Massachusetts: MIT Press. ISBN 9780262011181. Based on papers presented at a conference held at MIT in June 1987.
- Abraham, Katharine G.; Houseman, Susan N. (1993). Job security in America: lessons from Germany. Washington, D.C.: Brookings Institution. ISBN 9780815700753.
- Abraham, Katharine G.; Mackie, Christopher D. (2005). Beyond the market designing nonmarket accounts for the United States. Washington, D.C.: National Academies Press. ISBN 9780309093194.
- Abraham, Katharine G.; Spletzer, James R.; Harper, Michael J. (2010). Labor in the new economy. Chicago: University of Chicago Press. ISBN 9780226001432.

Journal articles

- Abraham, Katharine G.; Houseman, Susan N. (May 1993). "Female workers as a buffer in the Japanese economy". The American Economic Review. 83 (2). American Economic Association: 45–51. JSTOR 2117638.
- Abraham, Katharine G.; Houseman, Susan N. (Summer 1993). "Job security in America: a better approach". The Brookings Review. 11 (3): 34–35. doi:10.2307/20080404. JSTOR 20080404.
- Abraham, Katharine G.; Haltiwanger, John C. (September 1995). "Real wages and the business cycle". Journal of Economic Literature. 33 (3). American Economic Association: 1215–1264. JSTOR 2729121.
- Abraham, Katharine G. (March 2003). "Toward a cost-of-living index: progress and prospects". Journal of Economic Perspectives. 17 (1): 45–58. doi:10.1257/089533003321164949. JSTOR 3216839.
- Abraham, Katharine G.; Maitland, Aaron; Bianchi, Suzanne M. (2006). "Nonresponse in the American time use survey: who is missing from the data and how much does it matter?". Public Opinion Quarterly. 70 (5): 676–703. doi:10.1093/poq/nfl037. S2CID 145566407.
- Abraham, Katharine G.; Spletzer, James R. (May 2009). "New evidence on the returns to job skills". The American Economic Review. 99 (2): 52–57. doi:10.1257/aer.99.2.52. JSTOR 25592374.
- Abraham, Katharine G.; Haltiwanger, John C.; Sandusky, Kristin; Spletzer, James R. (April 2013). "Exploring differences in employment between household and establishment data" (PDF). Journal of Labor Economics. 31 (S1): S129–S172. doi:10.1086/669062. JSTOR 669062. S2CID 158263405.
- Abraham, Katharine G.; Houseman, Susan N. (October 2014). "Short-time compensation as a tool to mitigate job loss? Evidence on the U.S. experience during the recent recession". Industrial Relations: A Journal of Economy and Society. 53 (4): 543–567. doi:10.1111/irel.12069. hdl:10419/64398. SSRN 2048540. Pdf.
- Working papers and National Bureau of Economic Research (NBER) papers.
- Abraham, Katharine G.; Haltiwanger, John C. (March 2019). "The Consequences of Long Term Unemployment: Evidence from Matched Employer-Employee Data". ILR Review. 72 (2): 266–299. doi:10.3386/w22665.
