= Asor =

Biblical instrument of ten strings

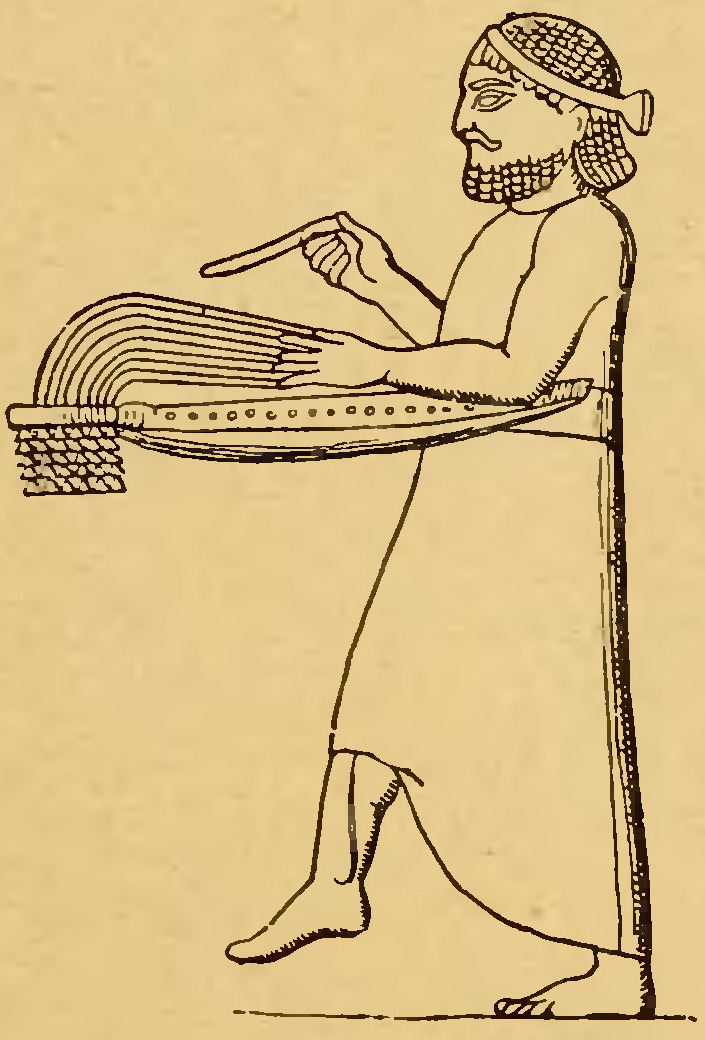
Line drawing labeled Asor Assyrien (Assyrian Asor). This is a representation of a horizontal angular harp. From the 1884 book Histoire de la musique by Henri Marie Lavoix (1846–1897).

The asor (Hebrew: עָשׂוֹר ʿasor; from עשר eśer, meaning "ten") was a musical instrument "of ten strings" mentioned in the Bible. There is little agreement on what sort of instrument it was or to what instruments it had similarities.

== Biblical references ==
The word occurs only three times in the Bible, and has not been traced elsewhere. In Psalm 33:2 the reference is to "kinnor, nebel and asor" (Hebrew: הוֹדוּ לַיהוָה בְּכִנּוֹר; בְּנֵבֶל עָשׂוֹר, זַמְּרוּ-לוֹ׃); in Psalm 92:3, to "nebel and asor"; in Psalm 144 to "nebel-asor".

In the King James Version asor is translated "an instrument of ten strings", with a marginal note "omit" applied to "instrument". In the Septuagint, the word being derived from a root signifying "ten", the Greek is ἐν δεκαχορδῷ or ψαλτήριον δεκάχορδον, in the Vulgate in decachordo psalterio. Each time the word asor is used it follows the word nebel, and probably merely indicates a variant of the nebel, having ten strings instead of the customary twelve assigned to it by Josephus.

== Bibliography ==
- Hermann Mendel and August Reissmann, Musikalisches Conversations-Lexikon, vol. 1 (Berlin, 1881)
- Sir John Stainer, The Music of the Bible, pp. 35–37
- Forkel, Allgemeine Geschichte der Musik, vol.1 p. 133 (Leipzig, 1788).

== See also ==
- Psaltery
