= Gustav Schilling =

Gustav Schilling may refer to:

- Gustav Schilling (musicologist)(1805–1880), German musicologist, editor and lexicographer.
- Gustav "Guus" Schilling (1876– 1951), Dutch track cyclist

== See also ==
- Walter Curt Gustav Schilling (1895–1943), German general during World War II
