= Brodmann area 47 =

Brain area

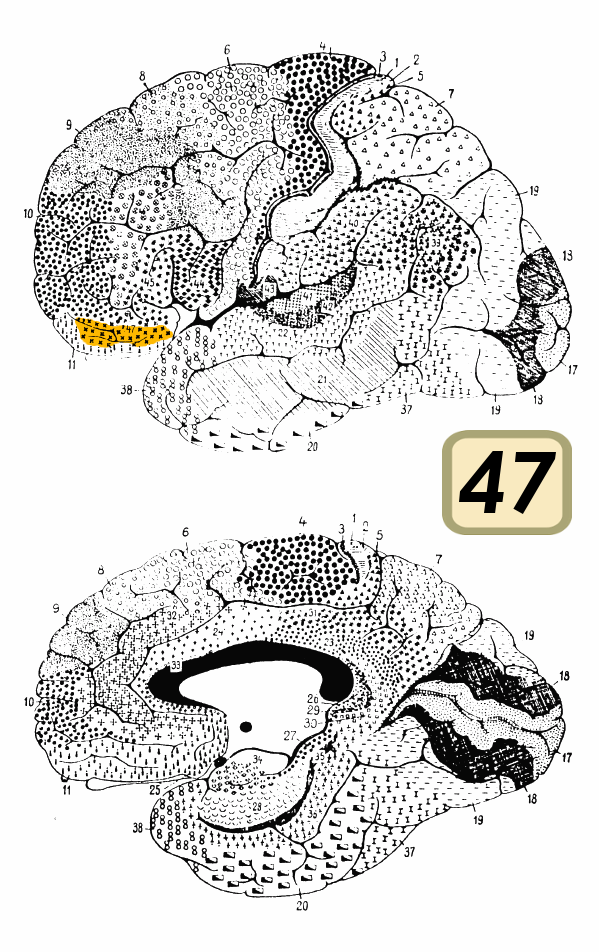

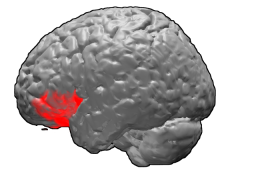

Details

Identifiers
- Latin: area orbitalis
- NeuroLex ID: birnlex_1779
- FMA: 68644

Brodmann area 47, or BA47, is part of the frontal cortex in the human brain. It curves from the lateral surface of the frontal lobe into the ventral (orbital) frontal cortex. It is inferior to BA10 and BA45, and lateral to BA11. This cytoarchitectonic region most closely corresponds to the gyral region the orbital part of inferior frontal gyrus, although these regions are not equivalent. Pars orbitalis is not based on cytoarchitectonic distinctions, and rather is defined according to gross anatomical landmarks. Despite a clear distinction, these two terms are often used liberally in peer-reviewed research journals.

BA47 is also known as orbital area 47. In the human, on the orbital surface it surrounds the caudal portion of the orbital sulcus (H) from which it extends laterally into the orbital part of inferior frontal gyrus (H). Cytoarchitectonically it is bounded caudally by the triangular area 45, medially by the prefrontal area 11 of Brodmann-1909, and rostrally by the frontopolar area 10 (Brodmann-1909).

It incorporates the region that Brodmann identified as "Area 12" in the monkey, and therefore, following the suggestion of Michael Petrides, some contemporary neuroscientists refer to the region as "BA47/12".

BA47 has been implicated in the processing of syntax in oral and sign languages, musical syntax, and semantic aspects of language.

== Functions and Clinical Considerations ==
=== Language Processing and Comprehension ===
A major function of BA47 is language processing and comprehension. Although Broca’s and Wernicke’s areas are often the major foci of neuroanatomical studies related to language, research has discovered that these two areas are not as integral to language comprehension as originally thought; other structures like BA47 play a major role. Specifically, BA47 is active in tasks regarding semantics, or identifying the meaning of words and sentences. To understand language semantics, consider Dapretto and Bookheimer’s (1999) study where participants needed to identify that there was a difference between the sentences, “The man was attacked by the Doberman,” and “The man was attacked by the Pitbull.” While sentence form was similar, the words Doberman and Pitbull had different meanings, specifically dog breeds. This is indicative of a change in semantics. Having defined what semantics are, it is important to identify the functional limitations of individuals with damage to BA47. Patients with lesions to BA47 reported difficulty engaging in tasks that required one to process words as well as tasks that required one to be familiar with grammatical rules.

Studies have determined that BA47 is involved in processing more than just spoken language. Considering BA47’s role in language semantics, this function is not related only to oral communication; BA47 is also important for identifying semantics in sign language. Specifically, BA47 plays a role in helping us determine what spoken words mean as well as what signed words mean. This finding that similar areas of the brain are active when processing different types of linguistic information is especially interesting considering the fact that the sensory modalities involved in spoken and sign language are different, the former involves audition and the latter involves vision. Furthermore, in addition to language processing, BA47 helps us process music. Levitin and Menon (2003) found that BA47 showed greater activation when individuals were presented with “scrambled” sounds that violated their expectations versus sounds that went together and confirmed their expectations. That is, with disrupted musical structure, participants required more brain processing for musical comprehension, and that happened in BA47.

=== Emotional Recognition ===
BA47 is thought to be related to the recognition of emotions. The emotions thought to be recognized by BA47 are fear, disgust, and anger. This hypothesis was tested be using an fMRI experiment on six healthy individuals. They were shown eight faces showing the emotions of fear, disgust, anger, or neutral. The fMRI image was taken after the subjects were shown the face for 3 seconds. BA47 showed increased activity when the subject was shown the emotions of fear, disgust, and anger.

Animation.

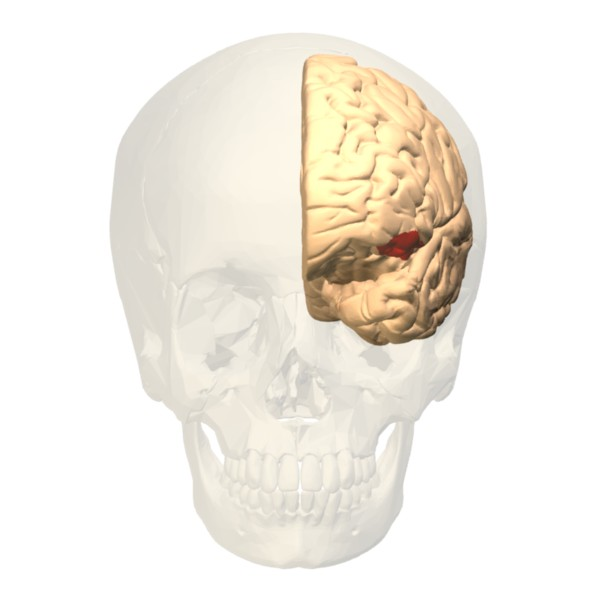
Frontal view.

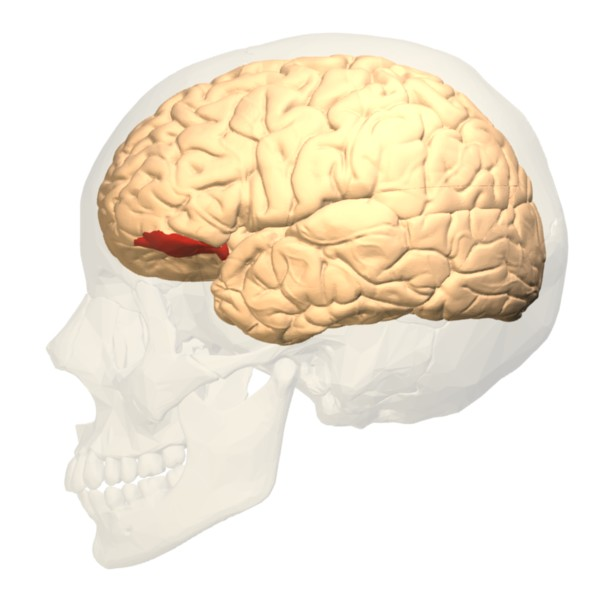
Lateral view.

== See also ==
- Brodmann area
- List of regions in the human brain
