= W. E. Upjohn Institute for Employment Research =

Organization based in Michigan, United States

- Established: 1945
- President: Michael Horrigan
- Budget: Revenue: $20,959,616; Expenses: $19,016,154 (FYE December 2015)
- Address: 300 S. Westnedge Avenue; Kalamazoo, MI 49007-4686
- Website: www.upjohn.org

The W. E. Upjohn Institute for Employment Research is an American research organization based in Kalamazoo, Michigan. The Institute conducts research on issues related to employment and administers government employment programs.

== History ==
The W. E. Upjohn Institute for Employment Research is an activity of the W. E. Upjohn Unemployment Trustee Corporation which was established in 1932 by W. E. Upjohn, founder of the Upjohn Company. The Trustee Corporation established the Upjohn Institute in 1945 for the purpose of "conducting research into the causes and effects of unemployment and measures for the alleviation of unemployment."

== Operations ==
With a staff of about 100, the Institute conducts and funds research into employment-related issues, as well as administers federal and state employment programs, including Michigan Works! Southwest, for four counties in southwest Michigan. The Institute manages the academic journal Economic Development Quarterly.

Economist Randall W. Eberts, a former senior staff economist on the President's Council of Economic Advisors, served as Upjohn Institute president for 25 years before being succeeded in 2019 by Michael Horrigan.

== Notable staff ==
- Michael Horrigan, President
- Susan Houseman, Vice President and Director of Research
- Randall W. Eberts, Senior Researcher
- Aaron Sojourner, Senior Researcher
- Timothy J. Bartik, Senior Economist
