= Eberts =

Eberts may refer to:

== People ==
- Christopher Eberts, Canadian film and television producer
- David McEwen Eberts (1850–1924), Canadian lawyer and politician
- Jake Eberts (1941–2012), Canadian film producer
- Ken Eberts (born 1943), American painter
- Randall W. Eberts (born 1951), American economist
- Martin Eberts (born 1957), German diplomat
- Mary Eberts (born 1947), Canadian lawyer

== Places ==
- Eberts Field, former military airfield in Lonoke, Arkansas
- Eberts Villaby, enclave in Amager, Denmark
- John and Emma Lacey Eberts House, a private house in Wyandotte, Michigan and listed on the National Register of Historic Places

== See also ==
- Ebert, a surname
