= Hugo Ulrich =

German composer and educator (1827–1872)

Hugo Ulrich (26 November 1827 – 23 March 1872) was a German Romantic composer, music educator and arranger.

== Life ==
=== Childhood and youth ===
Hugo Ulrich was born on 26 November 1827 in Oppeln in Silesia (today the Polish city of Opole), where his father was a high school teacher. He was baptized Catholic. Both parents were enthusiastic about music; the father as a music teacher and piano player, and the mother above all as an excellent interpreter of Mozart's arias. After he lost his father at the age of nine, the rector of the Oppelner Gymnasium Kotzoldt gave him piano and organ lessons. He recognized Hugo Ulrich as an extraordinary student and encouraged his career as a professional musician even in his early years. Barely twelve, Ulrich also lost his mother, which left him practically destitute. Nevertheless, he first attended the Catholic High School St. Matthias in Breslau, where he received scholarship support and free instruction but had to perform church music. He worked as an alto there and had to play the organ at the Gymnasiumgottesdienst. Here he also received the first lessons in continuo by then organist Moritz Brosig. To the great grief of his guardian Kotzoldt and his kin, he neglected other subjects for the sake of music, so he was transferred to Glogau in 1846 to complete grammar school. In the same year, he successfully completed his Abiturientenexamen and moved to Berlin to study music there.

The Wroclaw University Music Director, Mosewius, who taught him to sing, and his patrons, had recommended the young Ulrich to the then most famous Berlin music professor, Adolf Bernhard Marx. However, he did not accept him as a student, allegedly only because he could not pay him the desired fee. On the recommendation of Giacomo Meyerbeer, who was then Director General of the Berlin Opera, he studied with the highly respected musical theorist and composition teacher Siegfried Dehn at the Stern Conservatory for more than two years.

=== Living and creating ===
Dealing with Siegfried Dehn was fruitful for Hugo Ulrich. Ulrich's B minor Symphony, which appeared in 1852, soon circulated in concerts across Germany, and with his Symphonie Triomphale, he won the grand prize of the Royal Belgian Academy in Brussels in 1853. When he attended the public premiere in Brussels on September 27, 1853, he received enthusiastic applause from the audience; the same success followed this symphony at every performance elsewhere. From then on, the new composer's creations were eagerly awaited.

In September, 1855, he was finally destined to travel to the land of his longing, to Italy, which he entered with great plans for new works. He lived in Venice, Turin, Genoa, Rome and Milan. Inspired by the "land of wonders", he soon began to work again: an opera: "Bertran de Born," to which Max Ring had written the text, occupied him seriously, among others, until external circumstances brought him back to Germany.

In March 1858 he returned to Berlin, but soon lost the joy of his youth almost entirely, probably because of the excessive self-demands, which put him under great pressure because of his earlier successes. Between February 1859 and April 1862, he taught composition at the Stern Conservatory in Berlin, where he had previously studied himself. Among his most famous pupils was Hermann Goetz. However, he soon gave up teaching completely because his incipient kidney disease was making it increasingly difficult. From then on, he devoted himself chiefly to piano arrangements, which he worked on in his Berlin apartment to be sent to his publishers, Leupertz in Breslau and C. F. Peters in Leipzig. He was still able to finish most of his opera and also began a third symphony in G major, which, however, was not completed. Ulrich died at the age of 45 (after Mendel-Reissmann) on 23 March 1872. On the other hand, other sources indicate May 23, 1872, as his date of death. He was buried in Berlin-Wedding at the Catholic cemetery in Liesenstraße.

=== Reception ===
Hugo Ulrich was regarded by his contemporaries as "one of the most gifted contemporary composers", according to Hermann Mendel. In his Musikalischen Konversationslexikon there is an extensive article devoted to Ulrich, which until now remained the most detailed account of Ulrich's life. Today, Hugo Ulrich is mainly known for his numerous (more than 200) piano arrangements for two and four hands of various works, including complete sets of symphonies and quartets by Haydn and Mozart in practical home editions.
