= Bartik =

Bartik is a surname. Notable people with this surname include:

- Jean Bartik (1924–2011), American computer programmer and real estate agent
- Timothy J. Bartik (born 1954), American economist
