= Aaron Sojourner =

American economist

- Born: about 1972

Academic background
- Education: Yale University (BA); University of Chicago (MPP); Northwestern University (PhD)
- Awards: John T. Dunlop Scholar Award, 2016
- Website: Official website

Aaron Sojourner is an American economist and senior researcher at the Upjohn Institute for Employment Research. He was formerly an associate professor of economics at the University of Minnesota's Carlson School of Management and senior economist for the Council of Economic Advisers. His work has been widely covered by the media, particularly on the impact of the COVID-19 pandemic on the labor market in the United States.

== Biography ==
Sojourner was raised largely in Washington, DC by parents active in the Mississippi Civil Rights Movement who had recently changed their names to "Sojourner" in honor of Sojourner Truth. He is a graduate of Yale University, the University of Chicago's Harris School of Public Policy, and Northwestern University.

== Research ==
Sojourner's research has focused on labor market institutions, particularly labor unions, hiring in the education sector, and consumer financial decisions. During the COVID-19 pandemic, he wrote widely cited forecasts of new unemployment insurance claims based on analyses of Google Trends data, analyses of how the pandemic would reduce childcare access, a study of screening practices in the workplace, and research on work on which employees advocate for workplace safety practices to protect themselves.

Sojourner's 2020 paper "Physician–patient racial concordance" was debunked in 2024.

=== Selected works ===
- Duncan, Greg J., and Aaron J. Sojourner. "Can intensive early childhood intervention programs eliminate income-based cognitive and achievement gaps?." Journal of Human Resources 48, no. 4 (2013): 945–968.
- Goda, Gopi Shah, Colleen Flaherty Manchester, and Aaron J. Sojourner. "What will my account really be worth? Experimental evidence on how retirement income projections affect saving." Journal of Public Economics 119 (2014): 80–92.
- Sojourner, Aaron J., Elton Mykerezi, and Kristine L. West. "Teacher pay reform and productivity panel data evidence from adoptions of Q-Comp in Minnesota." Journal of Human Resources 49, no. 4 (2014): 945–981.
- Sojourner, Aaron J., Brigham R. Frandsen, Robert J. Town, David C. Grabowski, and Min M. Chen. "Impacts of unionization on quality and productivity: Regression discontinuity evidence from nursing homes." ILR Review 68, no. 4 (2015): 771–806.
- Sojourner, Aaron J. "Do unions promote members' electoral office holding? Evidence from correlates of state legislatures' occupational shares." ILR Review 66, no. 2 (2013): 467–486.
- Greenwood, Brad N., Rachel R. Hardeman, Laura Huang, and Aaron Sojourner. "Physician–patient racial concordance and disparities in birthing mortality for newborns." Proceedings of the National Academy of Sciences 117, no. 35 (2020): 21194–21200.
