= Country dance =

Type of social dance

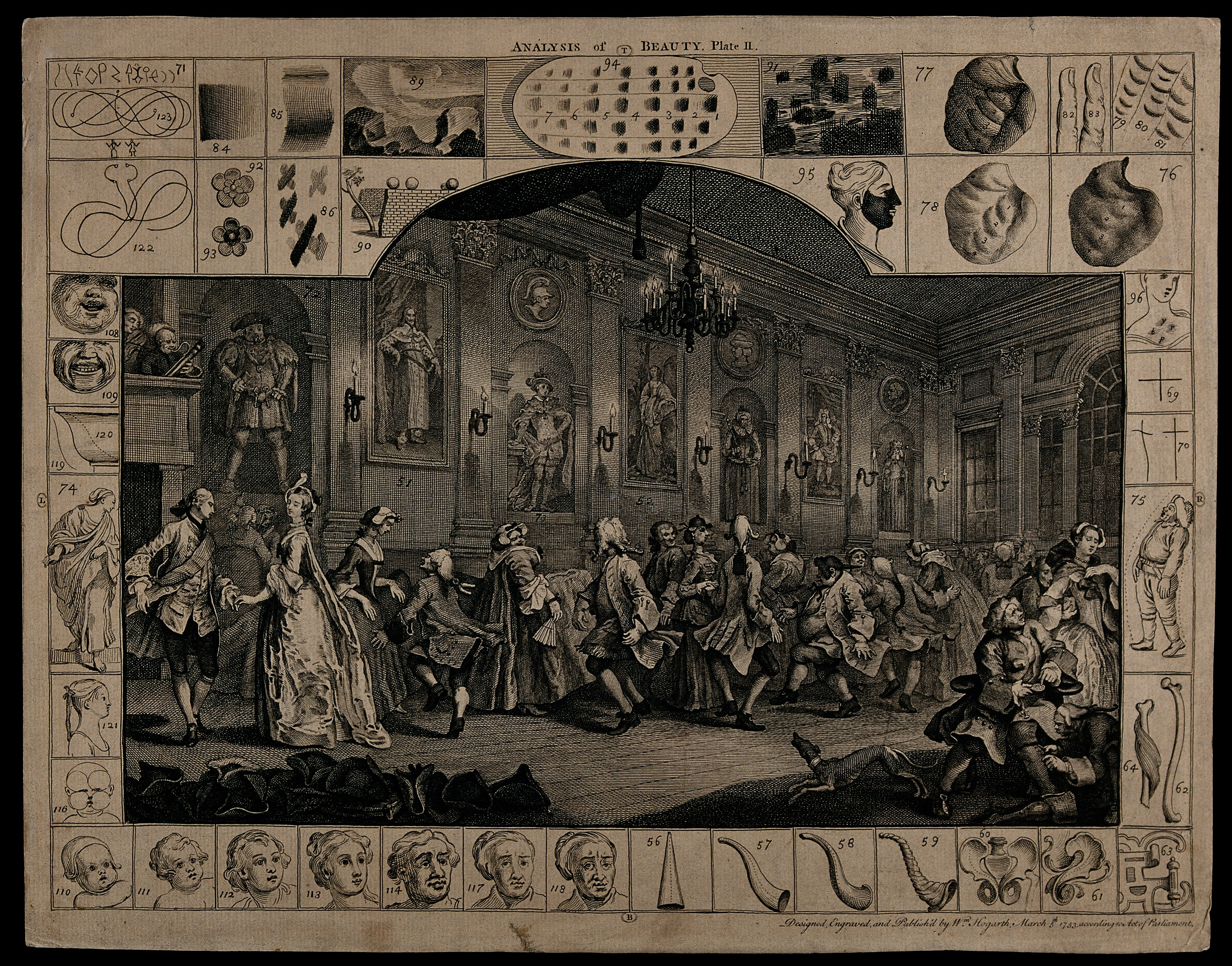
Comical 18th-century country dance; engraving by Hogarth

A country dance is any of a very large number of social dances of a type that originated in England in the British Isles; it is the repeated execution of a predefined sequence of figures, carefully designed to fit a fixed length of music, performed by a group of people, usually in couples, in one or more sets. The figures involve interaction between partners and with other dancers, usually with a progression so that each participant dances with everyone in the set. It is common in modern times to have a "caller" who teaches the dance and then calls the figures during the dance. Country dances are done in many different styles.

As a musical form written in 2/4 or 6/8 time, the contredanse was used by Beethoven and Mozart. Beethoven's 6 Ecosaises WoO83 are dated to 1806. Mozart's 6 Ländlerische Tänze, K.606 are dated to 1791.

Introduced to South America by French immigrants, country dance had great influence upon Latin American music as contradanza.

The Anglais (from the French word meaning 'English') or Angloise is another term for the English country dance. A Scottish country dance may be termed an écossaise. Irish set dance is also related.

== Characteristics ==
The English country dance "Good Man of Cambridge" in Manhattan in May 2024

A set is a formation of dancers. The most common formations are longways for as many as will, i.e. couples in long lines, and squares, consisting of four couples. The longways formation occurs in more than 12,000 modern contra dances; it was also the most popular formation in all the dance publications of the 18th and early 19th centuries. In 2003, Burleson's Square Dancer's Encyclopedia listed 5125 calls or figures. Circles and fixed-length longways sets are also very common, but the possible formations are limited only by the imagination of the choreographer.

Thomas Wilson, in 1808, wrote, "A Country Dance is composed of an indefinite number of persons, not less than six, but as many more as chuse, but six are sufficient to perform any figure in the treatise." Wilson was writing about his own period. In fact, there are numerous dances for two couples, and quite a few for three or five dancers.

A figure is a pattern that the dancers trace along the floor, simple ones such as Circle Left are intuitive and can be danced with no prior knowledge, while complex moves such as Strip the willow need to be taught. The stepping and style of dancing varies by region and by period.

The English country dance "The Hop Ground" at Youth Dance Weekend 2025 in Vermont

Wilson in 1820 wrote, "Country Dance Figures are certain Movements or Directions formed in Circular, Half Circular, Serpentine, Angular, Straight Lines, etc. etc. drawn out into different Lengths, adapted to the various Strains of Country Dance Music." . Again, the possible figures are limited only by the imagination of the choreographer. Examples of some of the figures are provided in the Glossary of country dance terms.

The music most commonly associated with country dancing is folk/country/traditional/historical music, however, modern bands are experimenting with countless other genres.

While some dances may have originated on village greens, the vast majority were, and still are, written by dancing masters and choreographers.

Each dance consists of a series of figures, hopefully smoothly linked together, designed to fit to the chosen music. The most common form of music is 32 bar jigs or reels, but any music suitable for dancing can be used. In most dances the dancers will progress to a new position so that the next time through the music they are dancing with different people.

While English folk dance clubs generally embrace all types of country dance, American English country dance groups tend to exclude modern contra dances and square dances.

The English country dance "Softly Good Tummas" (1718) at Youth Dance Weekend 2024 in Vermont

Country dancing is intended for general participation, unlike folk dances such as clogging, which are primarily concert dances, and ballroom dances in which dancers dance with their partners independently of others. Bright, rhythmic and simple, country dances have appeal as a refreshing finale to an evening of stately dances such as the minuet.

Historically, the term contra dance is another name for a country dance. Howe, in 1858, wrote that "The term 'Country Dance' is the one invariably used in all books on dancing that have been published in England during the last three centuries, while all works issued in France within the same period employ the term Contra Dance, or in French "Contre Danse". As the authority is equally good in both cases, either term is therefore correct. The Country or Contra Dance has been one of the most popular amusements in the British Isles, France, and other continental countries from time immemorial". However, "contra dance" is most commonly used today to refer to a specific American genre called contra dance.

== History ==
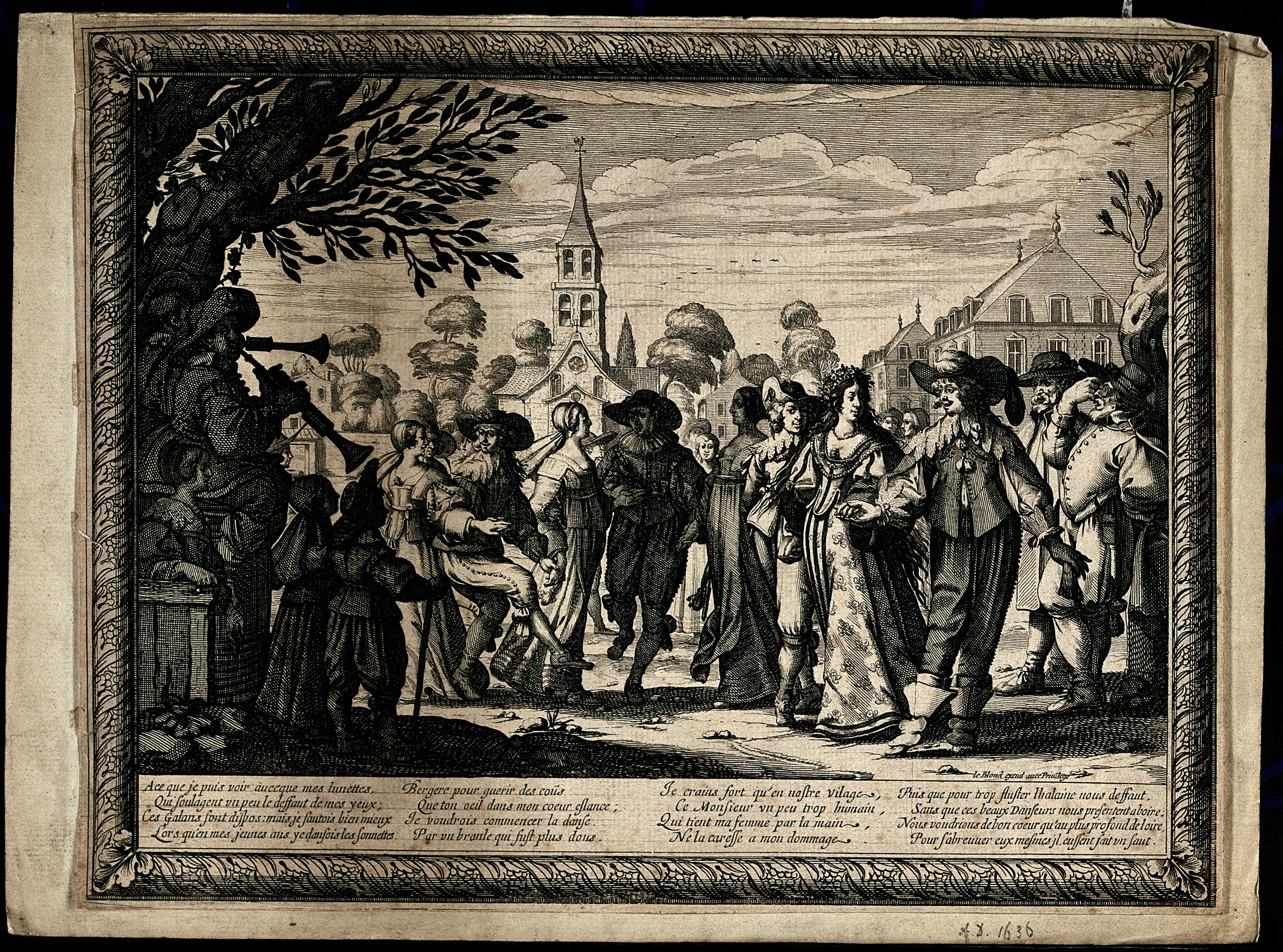
Village country dance; engraving by Abraham Bosse, 1633

Country dances began to influence courtly dance in the 15th century and became particularly popular at the court of Elizabeth I of England. Many references to country dancing and titles shared with known 17th-century dances appear from this time, though few of these can be shown to refer to English country dance. While some early features resemble the morris dance and other early styles, the influence of the courtly dances of Continental Europe, especially those of Renaissance Italy, may also be seen, and it is probable that English country dance was affected by these at an early date. Little is known of these dances before the mid-17th century.

John Playford's The English Dancing Master (1651) listed over a hundred tunes, each with its own figures. This was enormously popular, reprinted constantly for 80 years and much enlarged. Playford and his successors had a practical monopoly on the publication of dance manuals until 1711, and ceased publishing around 1728. During this period English country dances took a variety of forms including finite sets for two, three and four couples as well as circles and squares.

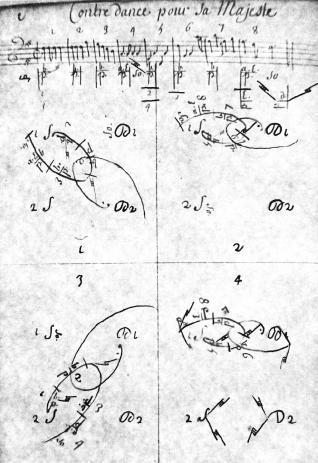
Lorin's contradanse choreography, one of the earliest western dance notations

The country dance was introduced to the court of Louis XIV of France in 1684 where it became known as the anglaise; a term used loosely to refer to any English folk dance that also encompassed the hornpipe, jig, and even the Scottish reel. The popularity of the anglaise in the French court led to experimentation of mixing English and French dance steps and styling which led to the development of the French contredanse. From the French court, the anglaise spread across Continental Europe, and remained a popular dance which composers created music for until the end of the 18th century.

André Lorin, who visited the English court in the late 17th century, presented a manuscript of dances in the English manner to Louis XIV on his return to France. In 1706 Raoul Auger Feuillet published his Recüeil de Contredances, a collection of "contredanses anglaises" presented in a simplified form of Beauchamp-Feuillet notation and including some dances invented by the author as well as authentic English dances. This was subsequently translated into English by John Essex and published in England as For the Further Improvement of Dancing.

By the 1720s the term contradanse had come to refer to longways sets divided into groups of three or two couples, which would remain normative until English country dance's eclipse. The earliest French works refer only to the longways form as contradanse, which allowed the false etymology of "a dance in which lines dance opposite one another". The square-set type also had its vogue in France and spread to much of Europe, Russia and North America during the later 18th century as the quadrille and the cotillion. These usually require a group of eight people, a couple along each side. "Les Lanciers", a descendant of the quadrille, and the "Eightsome Reel" are examples of this kind of dance. Dancing in square sets still survives in Ireland, under the name "set dancing" or "figure dancing".

For some time English publishers issued annual collections of these dances in popular pocket-books. Jane Austen, Charles Dickens and Thomas Hardy all loved country dancing and put detailed descriptions into their novels. But the vogue for the waltz and the quadrille ousted the country dance from English ballrooms in the early 19th century, though Scottish country dance remained popular.

== Influence ==
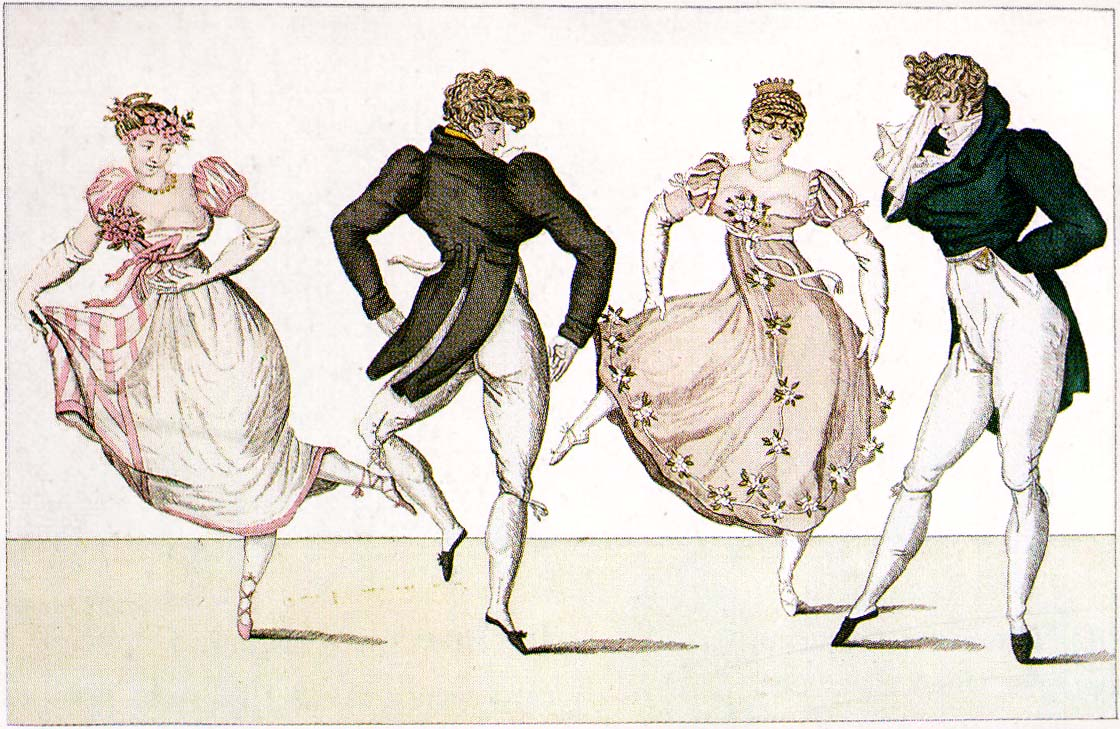
The "La Trénis" figure of the Contredanse, an illustration from Le Bon Genre, Paris, 1805

The English country dance and the French contredanse, arriving independently in the American colonies, became the New England contra dance, which experienced a resurgence in the mid-20th century. The quadrille evolved into square dance in the United States while in Ireland it contributed to the development of modern Irish set dance. English country dance in Scotland developed its own flavour and became the separate Scottish country dance. English céilidh is a special case, being a convergence of English, Irish and Scottish forms. In addition certain English country dances survived independently in the popular repertoire. One such is the Virginia Reel, which is almost exactly the same as the "Sir Roger de Coverley".

The contradanza, the Spanish and Spanish-American version of the French contradanse, became an internationally popular style of music and dance in the 18th century. The contradanza was popular in Spain and spread throughout Spanish America during the 18th century, where it took on folkloric forms that still exist in Mexico, Venezuela, Colombia, Peru, Panama and Ecuador. In Cuba during the 19th century the contradanza became an important genre, the ancestor of danzon, mambo and cha cha cha. Haitians fleeing the Haitian Revolution of 1791 brought to the Cuban version a Creole influence and a new syncopation.

The Engelska (Swedish for "English") or Danish Engelsk is a 16-bar Scandinavian folk dance in 2/4. Its name comes from the adoption in Scandinavia of English country dances and contra dances in the early 19th century. In Denmark the description "Engelsk" was used for both line and square dances of English origin.

== Revival ==
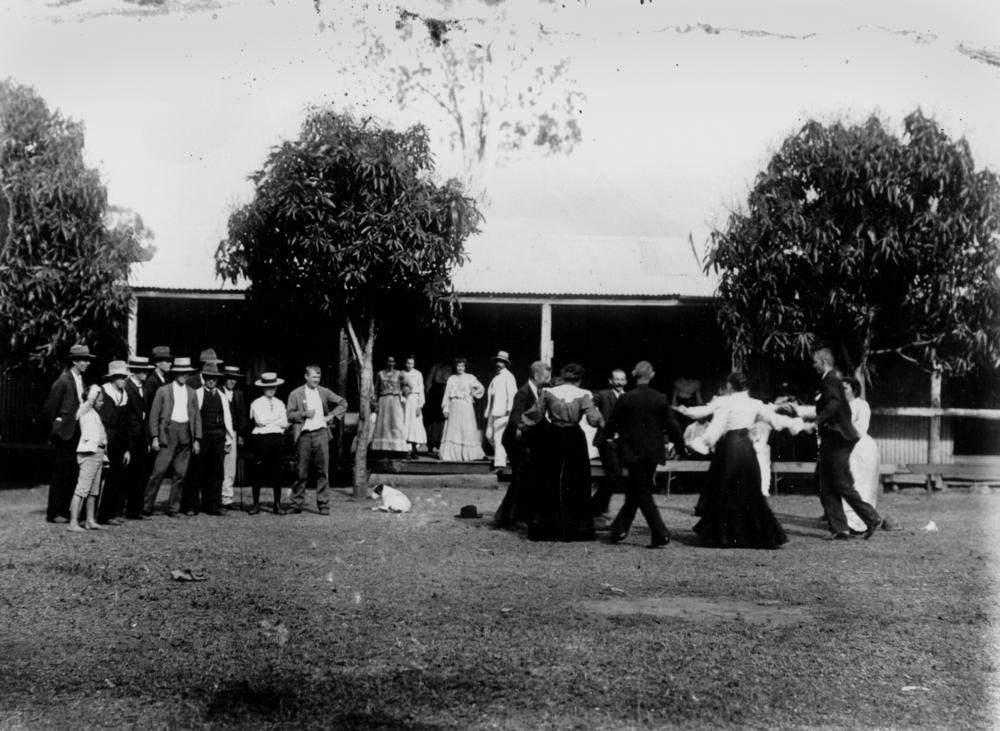
Country dance, Helenvale, Queensland, Australia, about 1910

Only due to the efforts of Cecil Sharp, Mary Neal and the English Folk Dance and Song Society in the late 19th and early 20th century did a revival take place, so that for some time schoolchildren were taught country dances. In the early 20th century, traditional and historical dances began to be revived in England. Neal, one of the first to do so, was principally known for her work in ritual dances, but Cecil Sharp, in the six volumes of his Country Dance Book, published between 1909 and 1922, attempted to reconstruct English country dance as it was performed at the time of Playford, using the surviving traditional English village dances as a guide, as the manuals defined almost none of the figures described. Sharp and his students were, however, almost wholly concerned with English country dances as found in the early dance manuals: Sharp published 160 dances from the Playford manuals and 16 traditional village country dances. Sharp believed that the Playford dances, especially those with irregular forms, represented the original "folk" form of English country dance and that all later changes in the dance's long history were corruptions.

The first collection of modern English country dances since the 1820s, Maggot Pie, was published in 1932, though only in the late 20th century did modern compositions become fully accepted. Reconstructions of historical dances and new compositions continue. Interpreters and composers of the 20th century include Douglas and Helen Kennedy, Pat Shaw, Fried de Metz Herman, Tom Cook, Ken Sheffield, Charles Bolton, Michael Barraclough, Colin Hume, Gary Roodman, and Andrew Shaw.

The English country dance "Alice" at Pinewoods Camp in Massachusetts, U.S in 2021.

The modern English country dance community in the United States consists primarily of liberal white professionals.

== See also ==
- Country–western dance
- Baroque dance
- International folk dance
- Maypole
- Stave dancing
- Troyl – Cornish word relating to social event for dancing
- Twmpath – Welsh word meaning a social gathering for dancing
- Schottische
