= Anglais =

Anglais or anglaise (the French word for the English language) may refer to:

- Les Anglais, Haiti, a commune
- Anglaise (dance), a 17th and 18th century term loosely used to refer to any of the English folk dances
- Les Anglais, a 1989 book by Philippe Daudy
- Charlotte Anglais, a character in the manga One Piece

== See also ==
- Cor anglais, a woodwind instrument
- Crème anglaise, a custard sauce
- French words for:
  - English language
  - English people
