= Conrad Friedrich Hurlebusch =

German/Dutch composer and organist

Conrad Friedrich Hurlebusch (baptised 30 December 1691 – 17 December 1765) was a German/Dutch composer and organist.

== Life ==
Hurlebusch was born in Braunschweig, Germany. He received his first education from his father Heinrich Lorenz Hurlebusch, an organist and composer. As a keyboard virtuoso, during his life, he devoted much time to tours through Europe and he visited, among others, Vienna, Munich, and Italy. From 1723 to 1725, he was a Kapellmeister in Stockholm. He held the same position in Bayreuth, Hamburg (from 1727), and Braunschweig. Reportedly, around 1735, he visited Johann Sebastian Bach in Leipzig. Bach promoted his compositions as the local bookseller of these works. Later, on 22 February 1743, he became organist at the Oude Kerk (Old Church) in Amsterdam and he retained this post until his death.

== Works ==
His output consists of cantatas, operas (L’innocenza difesa, Flavio Cuniberto), psalms, odes, concertos and keyboard sonatas. However, many of his works were lost. His 150 psalms were published in Amsterdam in 1766. Sammlung verschiedener und auserlesener Oden (1737‍–‍1743) by Johann Friedrich Gräfe contains 72 of his odes.
