= Écossaise =

French country dance in Scottish style

The Écossaise (in French, "Scottish") is a musical form and a type of contradanse in a Scottish style – a Scottish country dance at least in name – that was popular in France and Great Britain at the end of the 18th century and at the beginning of the 19th. Despite the Écossaise mimicking a Scottish country dance, it is actually French in origin. The Ecossaise was usually danced in 2/4 time in two lines, with Men facing the Women. As the dance is executed, couples progress to the head of the line.

Écossaise compositions were mainly written for solo piano, so that couples could dance to it. The musical form was also adopted by some classical composers, including Ludwig van Beethoven, (WoO 83 and WoO 86 for piano and WoO 22 and WoO 23, now lost, for military band); Franz Schubert, (D.145, 158, 299, 421, 511, 529, 643, 697, 734, 735, 781, 782, 783, 816, and 977); Frédéric Chopin (Op. 72 number 3) and Cécile Chaminade's Écossaise, Op. 151.
