= Contredanse =

Contredanse is a French dance of the late 17th and 18th centuries. The contredanse developed out of the English country dance; a dance form which emerged in England in the 15th century and was introduced to the French court of Louis XIV in 1684. The country dance, along with other English dances like the hornpipe and jig, were collectively known in the French court as the anglaise dance. As the popularity of the anglaise dances grew, French dance masters began experimenting with mixing French and English dances steps and styles which led to the creation of the contredanse.

The contredanse was utilized in French operas by Baroque period composers like André Campra and Jean-Philippe Rameau.
