= Angloise (Leopold Mozart) =

Composition from a forged music collection

"Angloise" is an anglaise in D minor for piano from Notebook for Wolfgang written for Wolfgang Amadeus Mozart by his father Leopold Mozart.

Hermann Abert attributed in 1922 most of the works in the notebook, including the "Angloise", to Johann Friedrich Gräfe; the "Angloise" is the last movement of Suite VIII in that collection.

However, Wolfgang Plath has shown in 1973 that publication to be a forgery, unrelated to Leopold or Wolfgang.
