= Johann Friedrich Gräfe =

German civil servant and composer (1711–1787)

Johann Friedrich Gräfe (7 May 1711 – 5 or 8 February 1787) was a German civil servant and an amateur composer, whose works are still known today.

== Life and career ==
He was born in Braunschweig and baptized on 7 May 1711 in Nauen. Gräfe studied law and spent most of his life in Braunschweig, except for brief stays in Halle and Leipzig. While a dilettante of music, he may have studied under Conrad Friedrich Hurlebusch and Carl Heinrich Graun. He was a Kammerrat (court councillor), a member of the court of the Principality of Brunswick-Wolfenbüttel. He was quite recognized at the time as an amateur composer. Gräfe was also a poet. His daughter Louise Gräfe married the writer Johann Arnold Ebert.

Gräfe composed several lied collections, cantatas, some instrumental pieces, and an opera (Herkules auf dem Oeta). The attribution of his works is not always certain.

Hermann Abert attributed in 1922 most of the works in Leopold Mozart's Notenbuch für Wolfgang, including an "Angloise", to Gräfe. Wolfgang Plath showed in 1973 Notenbuch to be a forgery.

== Stage works ==
- Herkules auf dem Oeta (1782), Singspiel in one act; text by Benjamin Michaelis Michaelis. (also attributed to Anton Schweitzer and Joseph Aloys Schmittbaur)

== Selected works ==
- Sammlung verschiedener und auserlesener Oden zu welchen von den berühmtesten Meistern in der Music eigene Melodeyen verfertigt worden. (1737, 1739, 1741, 1743) 4 works in 1 volume, Hildesheim: Olms 2008 (Dokumentation zur Geschichte des deutschen Liedes 13). ISBN 978-3-487-13634-9
- Oden und Schäfergedichte in die Musik. Leipzig: Breitkopf, 1744.
- Sonnet auf das von Ihrer Koenigl. Hoheit der Churprinzessin zu Sachsen selbst verfertigte, in Musik gesetzte und abgesungene Pastorell Il Trionfo della fedeltà : womit zugleich eine neue Art Noten zu drucken bekannt gemachet wird. Leipzig, 1755; Facsimile Leipzig: Breitkopf & Härtel, 1919.
- Funfzig Psalmen, geistliche Oden und Lieder / zur privat und öffentlichen Andacht in Melodien mit Instrumenten gebracht. Braunschweig: Fürstl. Waysenhaus. Buchhandlung; Leipzig: Breitkopf, 1760.
