= Susan Houseman =

American economist (born 1956)

Susan Nelson Houseman
- Education: University of Virginia; Harvard University
- Spouse: Curtis E. Hall
- Children: 4
- Awards: 1985–86 Wells Prize for Outstanding Dissertation in Economics, Harvard University
- Scientific career
- Fields: labor economics
- Workplaces: W. E. Upjohn Institute for Employment Research; University of Maryland, College Park; Brookings Institution
- Website: https://www.upjohn.org/about/upjohn-team/staff/susan-n-houseman

Susan N. Houseman (born 1956) is an American economist, vice president and director of research at the W. E. Upjohn Institute for Employment Research. She is also a member of the National Bureau of Economic Research Conference on Research on Income and Wealth, chairs the Technical Advisory Committee of the U.S. Bureau of Labor Statistics, and co-directs the Labor Statistics Program at the IZA Institute of Labor Economics.

== Education ==
Houseman holds a Bachelor of Arts degree in economics and international relations from the University of Virginia and a Ph.D. in economics from Harvard University (1985).

== Career ==
Houseman began her career as a professor at the University of Maryland School of Public Policy and a visiting scholar at the Brookings Institution. She left these institutions in 1989 to join the W. E. Upjohn Institute for Employment Research of Kalamazoo, largely because this position allowed her more time to raise her four children. Her research focuses on temporary help employment, outsourcing, and how these working arrangements affect workers' compensation and official productivity measures. Her research has shown that extraordinary growth in the computer industry—not automation in other industries—is responsible for all the unusual productivity growth in the manufacturing sector, and that declining manufacturing employment in the US is due more to trade than to automation.

During the COVID-19 recession, Houseman was a frequent commentator on layoffs and unemployment insurance programs. She also advocated using voluntary workshare programs to maintain relationships between workers and employers. The Biden presidential campaign cited her research on the success of these programs in European countries in their plans to expand the use of such programs in the United States.

== Selected works ==
- Houseman, Susan N. "Why employers use flexible staffing arrangements: Evidence from an establishment survey." Ilr Review 55, no. 1 (2001): 149–170.
- David, H., and Susan N. Houseman. "Do temporary-help jobs improve labor market outcomes for low-skilled workers? Evidence from" Work First." "American economic journal: applied economics 2, no. 3 (2010): 96-128.
- Houseman, Susan, Christopher Kurz, Paul Lengermann, and Benjamin Mandel. "Offshoring bias in US manufacturing." Journal of Economic Perspectives 25, no. 2 (2011): 111–32.
- Houseman, Susan. "Outsourcing, offshoring and productivity measurement in United States manufacturing." International Labour Review 146, no. 1‐2 (2007): 61–80.
- Abraham, Katharine G., and Susan N. Houseman. Does employment protection inhibit labor market flexibility? Lessons from Germany, France, and Belgium. No. w4390. National Bureau of Economic Research, 1993.
