= Timothy J. Bartik =

American economist (born 1954)

- Born: March 26, 1954 (age 72)
- Education: Yale University (BA Political Philosophy, 1975); University of Wisconsin-Madison (PhD, MS in Economics, 1982)
- Occupation: Economist
- Employer: W.E. Upjohn Institute for Employment Research
- Known for: Research in state and local economic development policies, local labor market policies, and labor demand policies, analyzed from a local, regional, state, and national perspective. He also conducts research analyzing preschool as an economic development program.
- Website: www.upjohn.org/about/upjohn-team/staff/timothy-j-bartik

Timothy J. Bartik (born March 26, 1954) is an American economist who specializes in regional economics, public finance, urban economics, labor economics, and labor demand policies. He is a senior economist at the W.E. Upjohn Institute for Employment Research in Kalamazoo, Michigan.

He developed a method of isolating local labor demand changes that is referred to as the Bartik instrument. This measure averages national employment growth across industries using local industry employment shares as weights to produce a measure of local labor demand that is unrelated to changes in local labor supply. This is a key tool in macroeconomic analysis.

== Biography ==
Bartik earned a B.A. degree from Yale University (magna cum laude) in 1975 and M.S. and Ph.D. degrees from the University of Wisconsin-Madison in 1982.

Prior to joining the Upjohn Institute in 1989, Bartik was assistant professor of economics at Vanderbilt University (1982–1989), and legislative assistant for housing and urban policy for U.S. Senator Donald W. Riegle Jr. (1975–1978).

Bartik is also the son of computer programmer Jean Bartik.

== Research ==
Bartik's research includes work in the following areas:

- wage subsidies and public service jobs to promote job creation
- state and local economic development policy
- early childhood programs as a means of economic development.

Bartik is also the creator of the "Panel Data on Incentives and Taxes database", a free online tool that offers the most comprehensive information available to date on incentives to business for economic development provided by state and local governments in the United States. Accompanying the database is a report (and detailed appendices) that explains how the database is constructed while offering preliminary analyses that begin to answer questions about how incentives vary.

== Publications ==
=== Books ===
- Making Sense of Incentives: Taming Business Incentives to Promote Prosperity. Kalamazoo, Mich.: W.E. Upjohn Institute for Employment Research, 2019. ISBN 978-0-88099-668-6.
- From Preschool to Prosperity: The Economic Payoff to Early Childhood Education. Kalamazoo, Mich.: W.E. Upjohn Institute for Employment Research, 2014. ISBN 978-0-88099-482-8.
- Investing in Kids: Early Childhood Programs and Local Economic Development. Kalamazoo, Mich.: W.E. Upjohn Institute for Employment Research, 2011. ISBN 978-0-88099-372-2.
- A Future of Good Jobs? America's Challenge in the Global Economy (co-edited with Susan N. Houseman). Kalamazoo, Mich.: W.E. Upjohn Institute for Employment Research, 2008. ISBN 978-0-88099-331-9.
- Jobs for the Poor: Can Labor Demand Policy Help?. New York: Russell Sage Foundation, Kalamazoo, Mich.: W.E. Upjohn Institute for Employment Research, 2001. ISBN 978-0-87154-098-0.
- Who Benefits from State and Local Economic Development Policies?. Kalamazoo, Mich.: W.E. Upjohn Institute for Employment Research, 1991. ISBN 978-0-88099-113-1.

=== Other ===
Bartik has contributed over 30 chapters to various books, published over 30 papers in peer-reviewed journals such as Growth & Change, Economic Development Quarterly, Journal of Regional Science, Journal of Urban Economics, and Challenge. He has also authored numerous working papers, reports, and presentations and delivered testimony to several legislative bodies.

== Other activities ==
- (2008— ) National Advisory Board, Center on Local, State, and Urban Affairs, Gerald R. Ford School of Public Policy, University of Michigan
- (2003— ) Research affiliate, Rural Poverty Research Center, University of Missouri and Oregon State University
- (2001— ) Research affiliate, National Poverty Center, University of Michigan
- (2001— ) Co-editor, Economic Development Quarterly
- (2000–2008) School Board, Kalamazoo Public Schools (served as president 2005–2006)
- (1998— ) Editorial Board, Growth and Change
- (1992— ) Editorial Board, Regional Science Review
- (1991— ) Board of Associate Editors, Journal of Regional Science
- (1991— ) Editorial Board, Journal of Regional Studies
