= Karl Ebert =

Episcopal coat of arms of Karl Ebert

Karl Christian Ebert (15 October 1916 – 12 November 1974) was a German Roman Catholic prelate, who served as an auxiliary bishop in the Episcopal District of Erfurt-Meiningen in East Germany.

Karl Ebert was born on 15 October 1916 in Würzburg, Bavaria. He was ordained in 1941 as a priest and was a chaplain in Lahnstein and a soldier in the Wehrmacht. In 1948 he became a chaplain in Hammelburg, in 1950 the curate and minister in Wernshausen and, in 1959, the parson of Unterwellenborn. In 1968 he became the dean of Saalfeld and, in 1971, the episcopal commissar of the Bishop of Würzburg in Meiningen. On 20 July 1973 he was made the titular bishop of Druas by Pope Paul VI and auxiliary bishop of the Episcopal District of Erfurt-Meiningen and appointed as the episcopal vicar for the Episcopal Vicariate of Meiningen. His episcopal consecration was conducted by the apostolic administrator in the Episcopal District of Erfurt-Meiningen, Hugo Aufderbeck, on 15 September 1973.

Karl Ebert died on 12 November 1974 in Meiningen, East Germany.

== Literature ==
- Short biography on: Ebert, Karl. In: Wer war wer in der DDR? 5th issue, Vol. 1, Ch. Links, Berlin, 2010, ISBN 978-3-86153-561-4.
