= Randall W. Eberts =

American economist (born 1951)

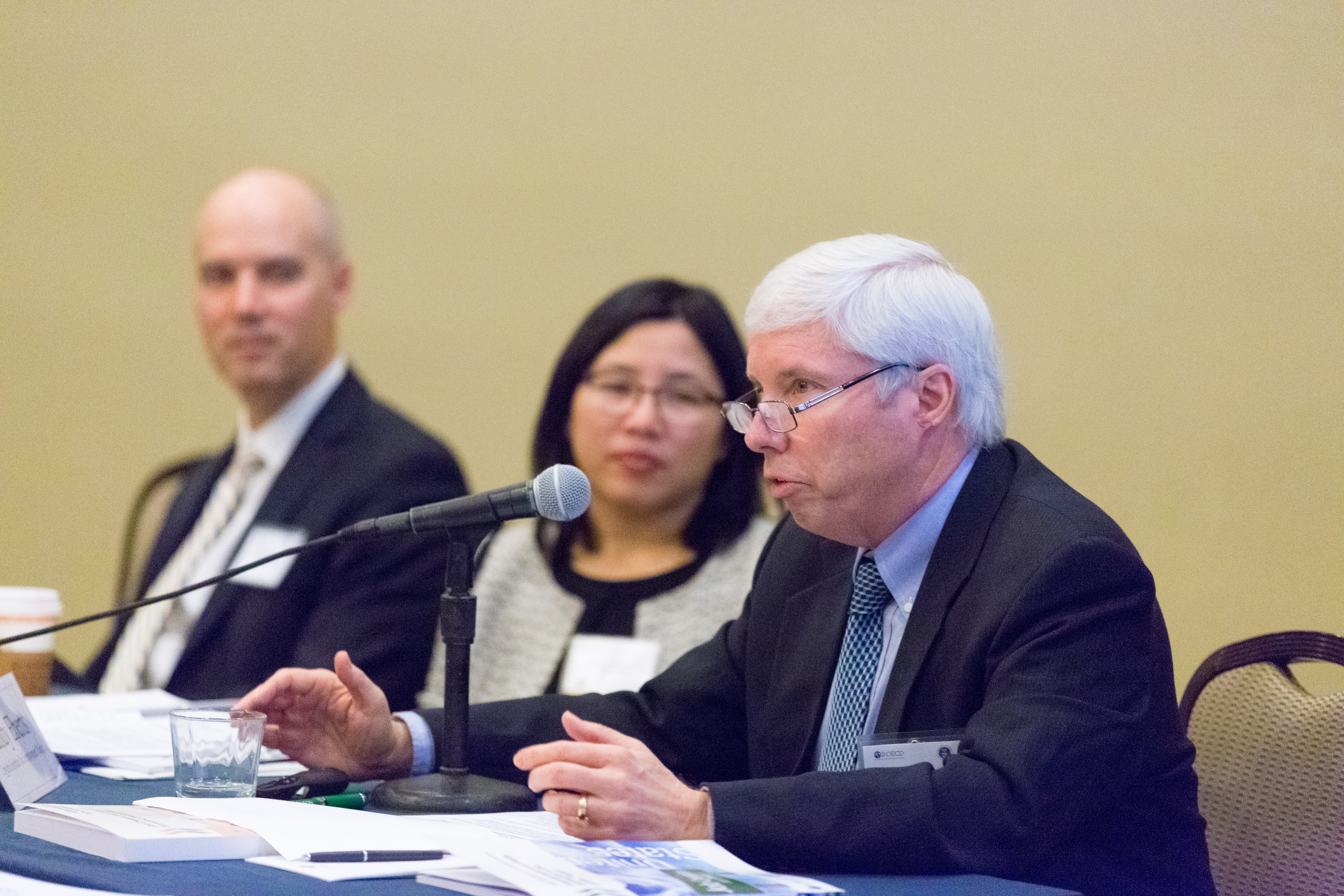
- Born: May 18, 1951 (age 75)
- Education: University of California-San Diego (B.A., 1973); Northwestern University (M.S. in Economics, 1975); Northwestern University (Ph.D. in Economics, 1978)
- Occupation: Economist
- Employer: W.E. Upjohn Institute for Employment Research
- Known for: President of W.E. Upjohn Institute for Employment Research, 1993-2019
- Website: www.upjohn.org/AboutUs/Staff/Eberts/

Randall W. Eberts (born May 18, 1951) is an American economist who specializes in the public workforce system, public finance, urban economics, labor economics, infrastructure and productivity, and policies promoting student achievement. He was president of the W.E. Upjohn Institute for Employment Research in Kalamazoo, Michigan from 1993 until 2019 and is currently a senior researcher there.

His research and expertise focus on the public workforce development system, with particular emphasis on statistical methodologies to set performance targets and to refer participants to services, determinants of student achievement, infrastructure and productivity, and factors related to local and regional economic development. The New York Times has quoted Eberts on the economic return from investment in education.

Eberts served on the Transportation Research Board's Committee on Transportation and Economic Development and has authored reports and papers on the topic for TRB and for academic journals and books.

He has worked with the U.S. Department of Labor to develop and implement a framework for adjusting national, state, and local performance targets for the workforce system and with the OECD/LEED to examine the role of local partnerships in workforce development and economic development.

Eberts earned a B.A. degree from the University of California-San Diego in 1973, an M.S. from Northwestern University in 1975, and a Ph.D. degree in economics from Northwestern University in 1982.

Prior to joining the Upjohn Institute in 1993, Eberts was associate professor of economics at the University of Oregon (1983–1987), senior staff economist on the President's Council of Economic Advisors (1991–1992), and assistant vice president and economist at the Federal Reserve Bank of Cleveland (1986–1993).

== Publications ==
- Older and Out of Work: Jobs and Social Insurance for a Changing Economy (co-edited with Richard A. Hobbie). Kalamazoo, Mich.: W.E. Upjohn Institute for Employment Research, 2008. ISBN 978-0-88099-329-6.
- Labor Exchange Policy in the United States (co-edited with David E. Balducchi and Christopher J. O’Leary). Kalamazoo, Mich.: W.E. Upjohn Institute for Employment Research, 2004. ISBN 978-0-88099-306-7.
- Targeting Employment Services (co-edited with Christopher J. O’Leary and Stephen A. Wandner). Kalamazoo, Mich.: W.E. Upjohn Institute for Employment Research, 2002. ISBN 978-0-88099-243-5.
- Wage and Employment Adjustment in Local Labor Markets (with Joe A. Stone). Kalamazoo, Mich.: W.E. Upjohn Institute for Employment Research, 1992. ISBN 978-0-88099-116-2.
- Structural Changes in U.S. Labor Markets in the 1980s: Causes and Consequences (co-edited with Erica Groshen). Armonk, NY: M.E. Sharpe, 1992. ISBN 978-0-87332-825-8.
- Economic Restructuring in the American Midwest (co-edited with Richard Bingham). Boston: Kluwer Academic Publishers, 1990. ISBN 978-0-79239-066-4.
- Unions and Public Schools: The Effect of Collective Bargaining on American Education (with Joe A. Stone). Lexington, MA: D.C Heath, Lexington Books, 1984. ISBN 978-0-66906-372-1.

Eberts is also the author or co-author of numerous book chapters, reports, journal articles, and working papers.
