= Economic Development Quarterly =

- Discipline: Economics
- Language: English
- Edited by: Larry C. Ledebur, Timothy J. Bartik, George A. Erickcek

Publication details
- History: 1987-present
- Publisher: SAGE Publications
- Frequency: Quarterly
- Impact factor: 0.917 (2017)

Standard abbreviations
- ISO 4: Econ. Dev. Q.

Indexing
- ISSN: 0891-2424 (print); 1552-3543 (web)
- LCCN: 99112701
- OCLC no.: 38949651

Links
- Journal homepage; Online access; Online archive

Economic Development Quarterly is a peer-reviewed academic journal covering the field of economics. The journal's editors-in-chief are Larry C. Ledebur (Cleveland State University), Timothy J. Bartik (Upjohn Institute for Employment Research), and George A. Erickcek (Upjohn Institute for Employment Research). It was established in 1987 and is currently published by SAGE Publications in association with Cleveland State University.

== Abstracting and indexing ==
Economic development Quarterly is abstracted and indexed in Scopus and the Social Sciences Citation Index. According to the Journal Citation Reports, its 2017 impact factor is 0.917, ranking it 31 out of 40 journals in the category "Urban Studies" 46 out of 57 journals in the category "Planning and Development", and 229 out of 333 journals in the category "Economics".
