= Johann Arnold Ebert =

German writer and translator (1723–1795)

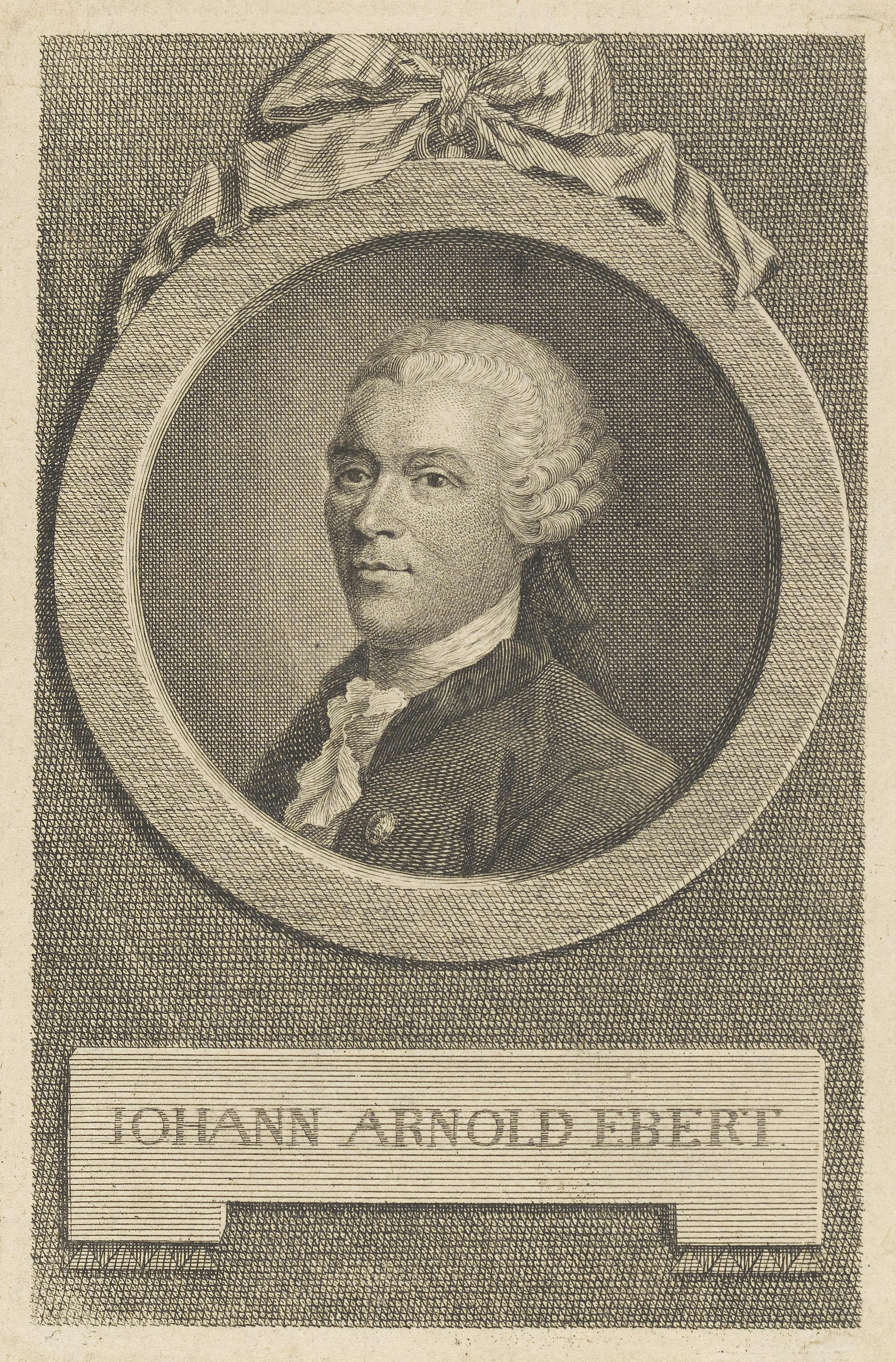
Johann Arnold Ebert

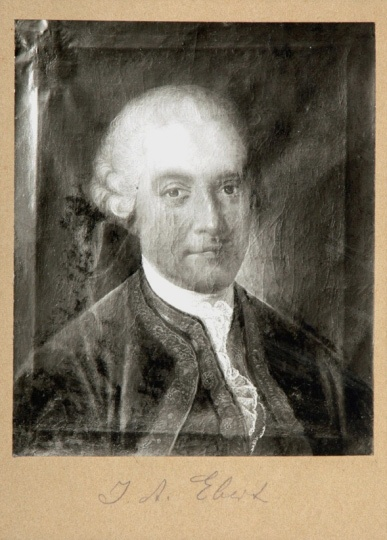
Johann Arnold Ebert, painted by Benjamin Calau, 1770

Johann Arnold Ebert (February 8, 1723 – March 19, 1795) was a German writer and translator.

== Life ==
Ebert was the son of a city soldier in Hamburg. There he attended the Gelehrtenschule des Johanneums and then the Akademisches Gymnasium. In his youth, Ebert was greatly influenced by the poet Friedrich von Hagedorn, who supported him and encouraged his interest in English language and literature. He began to study theology at the University of Leipzig in 1743, but then switched to philology. He became part of the circle of contributors to the Bremer Beiträge and was also in contact with the literary circle of Johann Christoph Gottsched.

In 1748, he became the Hofmeister of the Collegium Carolinum in Braunschweig through his friend Karl Christian Gärtner. There he gave instruction in translation into the English language, teaching even the crown prince Charles William Ferdinand. He was in friendly contact with the important men of letters who lived in Brunswick and surrounding areas, including Justus Friedrich Wilhelm Zachariae, Johann Friedrich Wilhelm Jerusalem, Karl Christian Gärtner, and Konrad Arnold Schmid, as well as later Johann Joachim Eschenburg and Gotthold Ephraim Lessing (in whose appointment at the Herzog August Bibliothek in Wolfenbüttel he played a leading role). In 1753 he became a full professor and lectured on history. In 1770 Eschenburg took over these lectures, whereas Ebert began the teaching of Greek. In 1773 he married Louise Gräfe, the daughter of the councillor and composer Johann Friedrich Gräfe. In 1775, he became a canon at St. Cyriacus collegiate church in Braunschweig. In 1780, he was appointed councilor. Ebert died in 1795 in Braunschweig, where he was buried in the Martini cemetery.

Ebert's importance is based less on his own lyrical works than on his role as a cultural and literary agent. Most influential was his translation of Edward Young's Night-Thoughts, which elicited a rapturous enthusiasm for Young and a large number of imitations. With this work, Ebert set about increasing the esteem of English literature in the German-speaking world.

== Works ==
Haydn Die Warnung HobXXVc6

- Johann Arnold Ebert. Episteln und vermischte Gedichte. Hamburg, 1789
