= Johann Jakob Ebert =

German mathematician, journalist, author and astronomer

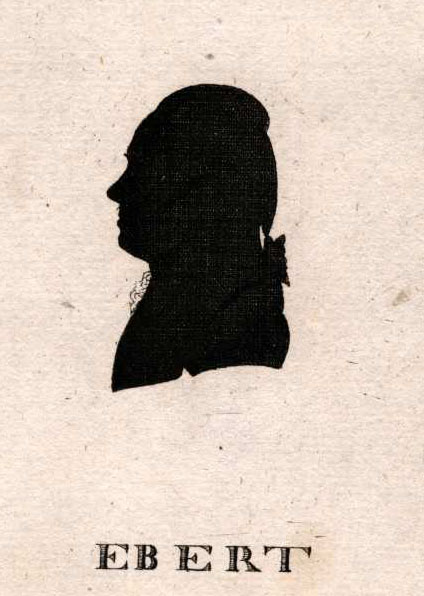
Johann Jacob Ebert

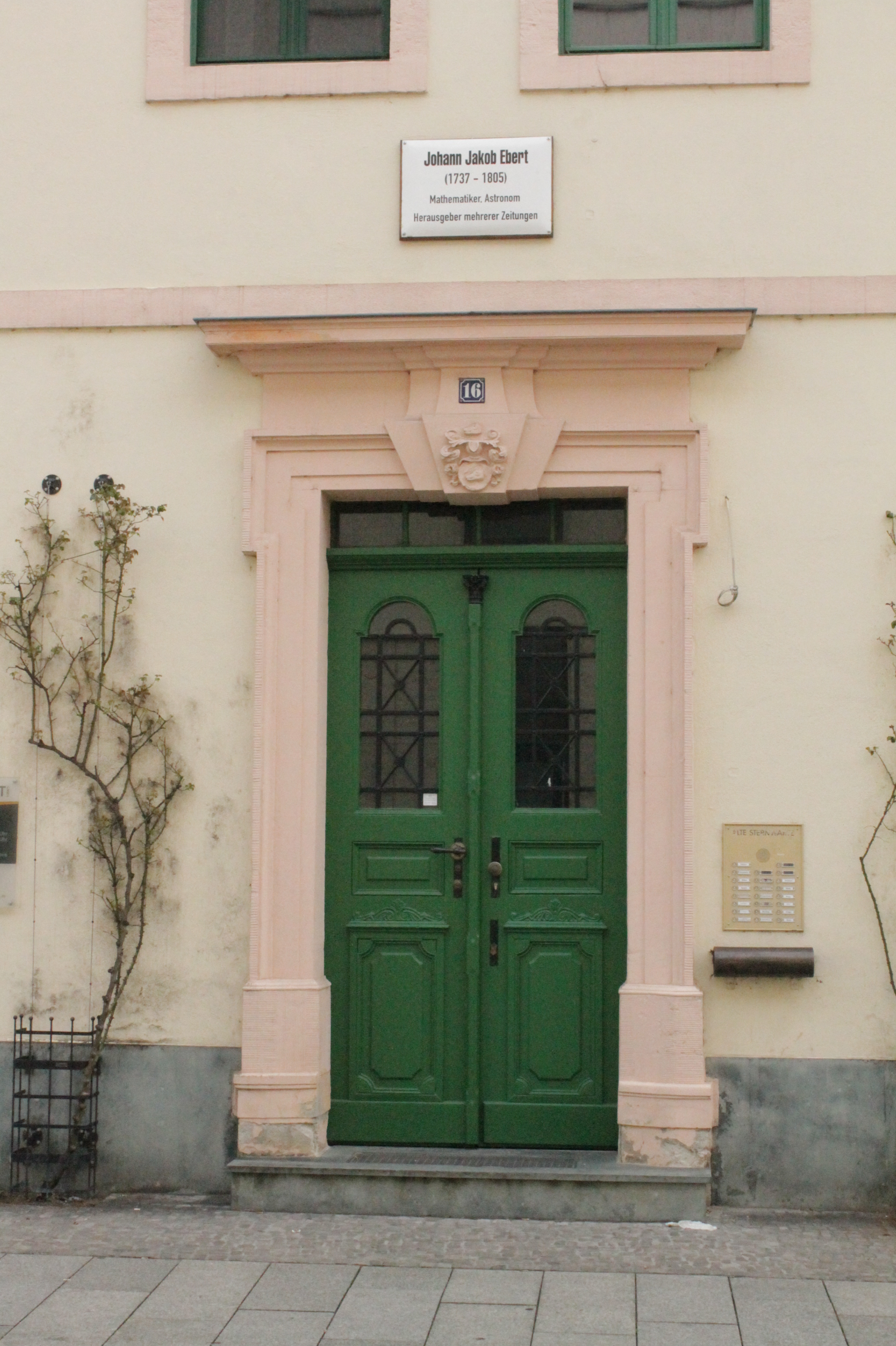
Plaque to Johann Jakob Ebert at 16 Burgermeisterstrasse in Wittenberg

Johann Jakob Ebert (20 November 1737 to 18 March 1805) was an 18th-century German mathematician, astronomer, poet and author.

== Life ==
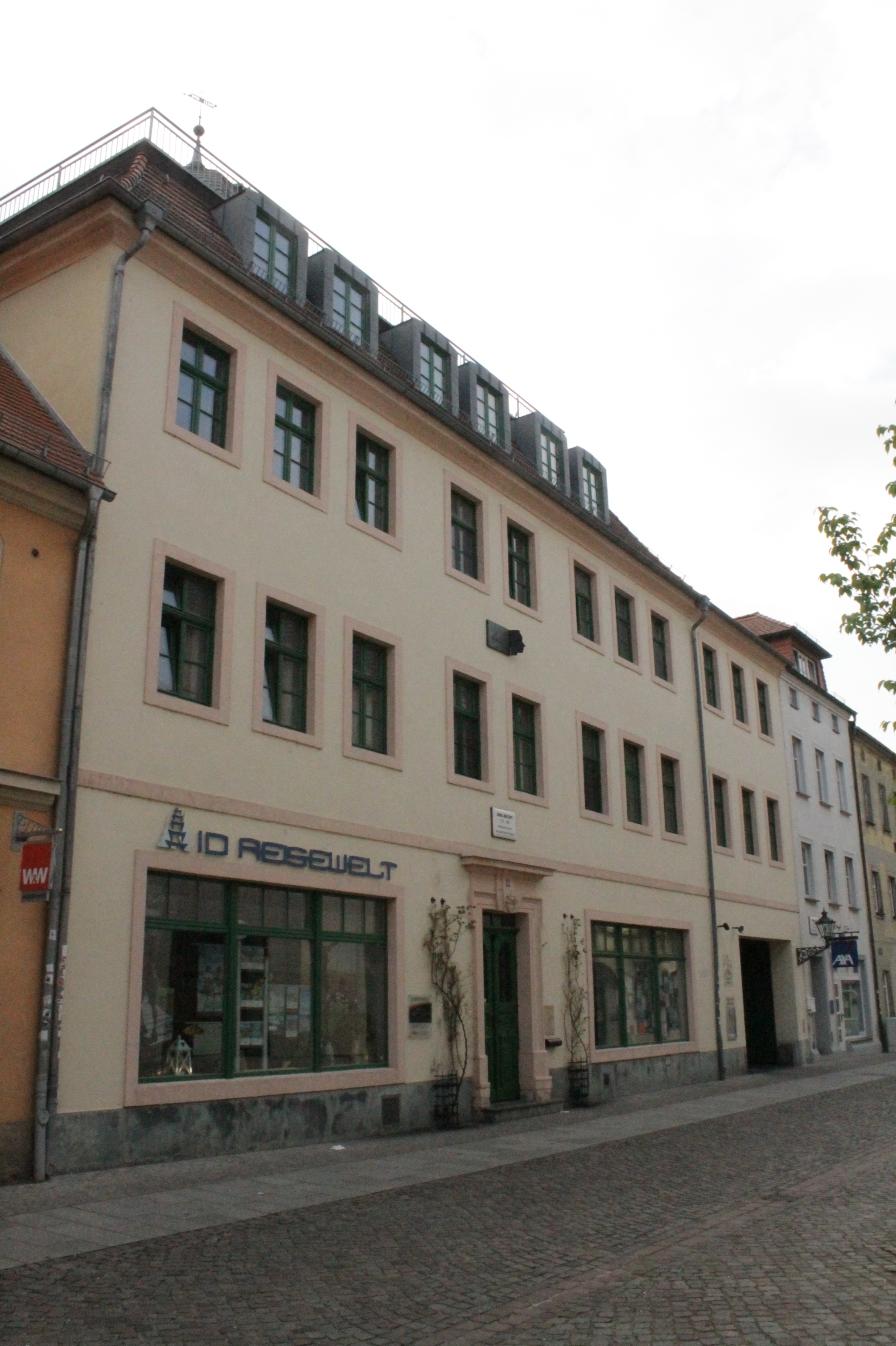
16 Burgermeisterstrasse in Wittenberg

Johann Jakob Ebert was born in Breslau, Prussia (today known as Wrocław, Poland). He was educated in Wurzen in western Saxony. He returned to his hometown to study at the Elisabeth Gymnasium.

In 1756 he enrolled at the University of Leipzig in Saxony to study Mathematics, Natural Philosophy (Physics) and Moral Philosophy. He graduated MA in 1761. Following his graduation, he lectured in Maths and Philosophy at the university. He worked with Christian Gellert and Johann August Ernesti.

In 1764 he began a grand tour of Germany and France. After his tour of Germany and France, he went to Russia in 1768 where he accepted a post as tutor to the children of Minister Teplof in St. Petersburg. In 1769 he went to the University of Wittenberg in Saxony as a junior professor of Lower Mathematics. He quickly obtained a reputation as a competent teacher.

From 1771 he published newspapers and periodicals in Wittenberg.

In June 1783, during a visit to Paris, he became the first German to fly in a hot air balloon. He met the Montgolfier Brothers on the same occasion. On his return to Wittenberg, the subject of aviation became part of his lectures. In 1785 he became professor of both Lower and Higher Mathematics at the University.

In 1789 he built an observatory at his house at 16 Burgermeisterstrasse in Wittenberg.

He died in Wittenberg on 18 March 1805.

== Publications ==
- The Beginnings of the Theory of Reason (1773)
- Nature for the Young (1777)
- Instruction in the Philosophical and Mathematical Sciences (1779)
- Biographies of Strange Creatures from the Animal Kingdom (1784)
- Natural History (1784)
- The Beginning of the Most Fine Parts of Natural Philosophy (1784)
- The Philosopher for Everyone (1786)
- Yearbook for Instructive Entertainment for Young Ladies (1795)
- Fables for Children and Young People (1810) posthumous

== Periodicals ==
- Tapeten 1771 to 1776
- Wittenberg Scholarly Newspaper 1778 to 1785
- Wittenberg Magazine 1781 to 1784
- Wittenberger Weekly Speak 1801 to 1804
