= Gustav Schilling (musicologist) =

German musicologist

Friedrich Gustav Schilling (3 November 1805 – March 1880) was a German musicologist, editor and lexicographer.

== Life ==
Born in Schwiegershausen, Schilling was the son of a cantor and village schoolteacher and performed as a pianist at the age of ten. From 1823, he attended the University of Göttingen, studied theology there, and probably obtained a doctorate in philosophy. In 1826, he went to the University of Halle, where he finished his studies. In 1830, he settled as a piano teacher in Stuttgart and became director of the music institute founded by Franz Stöpel.

He published numerous books on music and music education, in which he advocated a value-conservative-classical view of art, according to which the "perfection of mankind" The standard of all art, connected with the popular educational ideal, was that music practice and music knowledge could be learned by all, if one only applied the right system. He became best known through the Encyclopädie der gesammten musikalischen Wissenschaften (1835–1838), which he edited and in which numerous important musicians and scholars of the time participated. In some of his writings he was already accused by his contemporaries of plagiarism. For example, his main work Versuch einer Philosophie des Schönen in der Musik (1838) draws on Carl Seidel's Charinomos. Beiträge zur allgemeinen Theorie und Geschichte der schönen Künste (two volumes, Magdeburg 1825 and 1828). In part, he also plagiarised himself. In addition to plagiarism, contemporaries also criticised factual errors and unverified adoptions from other works in Schilling's encyclopaedias. The criticisms, among others by Heinrich Dorn and Carl Ferdinand Becker, resulted in public polemics, which were published in the Neue Zeitschrift für Musik edited by Robert Schumann and in the Jahrbüchern des deutschen National-Vereins für Musik und ihre Wissenschaften edited by Schilling.

In 1839, Schilling founded the "Deutscher National-Verein für Musik und ihre Wissenschaft" (German National Association for Music and its Science) and won the Kassel Kapellmeister Louis Spohr for the presidency. He became permanent secretary of this association and responsible editor of the Jahrbücher des Deutschen Nationalvereins für Musik und ihre Wissenschaft, which appeared from 1839 to 1843.

He fled Stuttgart on 1 April 1857, and travelled via Liverpool to the US, where he found shelter with one of his sons. He lived first in New York, then in Canada, and finally in Nebraska, on his son's farm. For debts amounting to 150,000 florins and forgery of bills of exchange, he was sentenced on 23 December 1862 "to a penal servitude of ten years." However, extradition to Germany failed.

Schilling died in Crete, Nebraska.

== Work ==
- De Revelatione divina. Diss. phil., 1829
- Relatio affectuum ad summam facultatem cognoscendi. Diss. phil., 1830
- Was ist Schuld an den heillosen Gährungen und Unruhen unserer Tage, und wodurch kann ihnen abgeholfen werden? Ein Wort seiner Zeit für Jedermann. Stuttgart 1830
- Musikalisches Handwörterbuch nebst einigen vorangeschickten allgemeinen philosophisch-historischen Bemerkungen über die Tonkunst. 1830
- Aesthetische Beleuchtung des Königlichen Hof-Theaters zu Stuttgart. Ein zeitgemäßes Wort an alle Theater-Direktionen, alle Künstler und das gesammte Kunst liebende Publikum. Stuttgart 1832
- Briefe über die äußere Canzel-Beredtsamkeit oder die kirchliche Declamation und Action. Stuttgart 1833; 2. verbesserte Auflage 1838, Erster Band, 1833, Second volume, 1833
- Die Kunst der äusseren Kanzel-Beredtsamkeit, oder die Lehre von der kirchlichen Declamation und Action. 2. Auflage. Stuttgart 1845, books.google.com
- Encyclopädie der gesammten musikalischen Wissenschaften, oder Universal-Lexicon der Tonkunst, 6 Bände und ein Zusatzband, Stuttgart 1835–1838 (2nd edition 1840–1842) (Digitalisate Google, Digitalisate HathiTrust)
  - 1. volume, 1835, A – Bq (urn:nbn:de:bvb:12-bsb10600488-3)
  - 2. volume, 1835, Braga – F-Moll (urn:nbn:de:bvb:12-bsb10600489-3)
  - 3. volume, 1836, Fockerodt – Irland (urn:urn:nbn:de:bvb:12-bsb10600491-6:{{{2}}})
  - 4. volume, 1837, Irregulärer Durchgang – Morin (urn:nbn:de:bvb:12-bsb10600492-2)
  - 5. volume, 1837, Moritz – Ries (urn:nbn:de:bvb:12-bsb10600493-7)
  - 6. volume, 1838, Riesenharfe – Zyka (urn:nbn:de:bvb:12-bsb10600494-3)
  - Supplement-Band, 1842 (urn:nbn:de:bvb:12-bsb10810234-0)
- Versuch einer Philosophie des Schönen in der Musik, oder Aesthetik der Tonkunst. Zugleich ein Supplement zu allen grösseren musikalischen Theorieen, und ein Hand- und Lesebuch für die Gebildeten aus allen Ständen zur Förderung eines guten Geschmacks in musikalischen Dingen. Mainz 1838, Gustav Schilling is available for free viewing and download at the Internet Archive
- Allgemeine Generalbasslehre, mit besonderer Rücksicht auf angehende Musiker, Organisten und gebildete Dilettanten. Darmstadt 1839, books.google.de
- Polyphonomos oder die Kunst, in sechsunddreißig Lectionen sich eine vollständige Kenntniß der musikalischen Harmonie zu erwerben. Ein Lehrbuch, zugleich zur Weckung und Förderung einer ächten musikalischen Bildung. Stuttgart 1839, Gustav Schilling is available for free viewing and download at the Internet Archive
- Jahrbücher des Deutschen Nationalvereins für Musik und ihre Wissenschaft, Karlsruhe 1839–1842 (Digitalisate Google)
  - Jg. 1 (1839) Gustav Schilling is available for free viewing and download at the Internet Archive
  - Jg. 2 (1840) Gustav Schilling is available for free viewing and download at the Internet Archive
  - Jg. 3 (1841) Gustav Schilling is available for free viewing and download at the Internet Archive
  - Jg. 4 (1842) Gustav Schilling is available for free viewing and download at the Internet Archive
- Populäre Einleitung in die sämmtlichen Schriften des neuen Testaments für den gebildeten Christen jedes Standes und jeder Confession, besonders den Religionslehrer deutscher Volksschulen, Reutlingen 1840
- Lehrbuch der allgemeinen Musikwissenschaft oder dessen, was Jeder, der Musik treibt oder lernen will, nothwendig wissen muß. Nach einer neuen Methode, zum Selbstunterricht, und als Leitfaden bei allen Arten von praktischem wie theoretischem Musikunterricht. Karlsruhe 1840, books.google.de
- Geschichte der heutigen oder modernen Musik. In ihrem Zusammenhange mit der allgemeinen Welt- und Völkergeschichte. Karlsruhe 1841, Gustav Schilling is available for free viewing and download at the Internet Archive
- Das Musikalische Europa, oder Sammlung von durchgehends authentischen Lebens-Nachrichten über jetzt in Europa lebende ausgezeichnete Tonkünstler, Musikgelehrte, Componisten, Virtuosen, Sänger &c. &c. Speyer 1842, Gustav Schilling is available for free viewing and download at the Internet Archive
- Leitfaden zum Unterrichte und zur eigenen Unterweisung in der Harmonielehre, insbesondere nach des Verfassers System derselben (Polyphonomos). In katechetischer Form bearbeitet. Stuttgart 1842, Gustav Schilling is available for free viewing and download at the Internet Archive
- Der Pianist oder die Kunst der Clavierspiels in ihrem Gesammtumfange theoretisch-praktisch dargestellt. Osterode 1843, Gustav Schilling is available for free viewing and download at the Internet Archive
- Musikalische Dynamik oder die Lehre vom Vortrage in der Musik. Kassel 1843, Gustav Schilling is available for free viewing and download at the Internet Archive
- Geschichte des Hauses Hohenzollern in genealogisch fortlaufenden Biographien aller seiner Regenten von den ältesten bis auf die neuesten Zeiten. Nach Urkunden und andern authentischen Quellen, Leipzig 1843 (Numerized)
- Franz Liszt. Sein Leben und Wirken, aus nächster Beschauung dargestellt. Stuttgart 1844, Gustav Schilling is available for free viewing and download at the Internet Archive
- Sicherer Schlüssel zur Kunst der Clavier-Virtuosität. Stuttgart 1844, Gustav Schilling is available for free viewing and download at the Internet Archive
- Musikalischer Autodidakt oder Anleitung zu vollständiger Kenntniss der musikalischen Harmonie durch Selbstunterricht. 1846
- Beethoven-Album. Ein Gedenkbuch dankbarer Liebe und Verehrung für den grossen Toten, gestiftet und beschrieben von einem Vereine von Künstlern und Kunstfreunden aus Frankreich, England, Italien, Deutschland, Holland, Schweden, Ungarn und Russland. Stuttgart o. J. [1846]
- Musikalisches Conversations-Handwörterbuch, enthaltend die Erklärung sämmtlicher in das Bereich der theoretischen und praktischen Musik gehörender Gegenstände, Kunstausdrucke, Schriftzeichen &: für Künstler und Dilettanten, Sänger und Instrumentalisten, Lehrer und Lernende der Musik. Stuttgart 1849
- Musikalische Didaktik oder die Kunst des Unterrichts in der Musik. Ein nothwendiges Hand- und Hülfsbuch für alle Lehrer und Lernende der Musik, Erzieher, Schulversteher, Organisten, Volksschullehrer etc. Eisleben 1851, Gustav Schilling is available for free viewing and download at the Internet Archive
- Allgemeine Volksmusiklehre oder didaktische Darstellung alles dessen, was der Musikunterricht in sämmtlichen Schulen, von den Gymnasien und höheren Töchterschulen an bis herab zur geringsten Dorfschule, sowie in den verschiedenen dilettantischen Vereinen, als Liedertafeln, Liederkränzen, Harmonien &c. &c. zur Erreichung seines eigentlichen Bildungszwecks notwendig zu lehren hat. Augsburg 1852, Gustav Schilling is available for free viewing and download at the Internet Archive
- Der Ocean, oder physisch-geographisch-historische Beschreibung des Weltmeers und seiner einzelnen Theile, Stuttgart Verlags-Bureau(1845, 1849)

== Works under the pseudonym "Dr. G. Penny" ==
- Guido. Eine Erzählung nach dem Leben, 2 volumes, 1832
- Peter Joseph von Lindpaintner, in Allgemeine musikalische Zeitung, Jg. 37, No. 40, 7 October 1835, pp. 661–670 and No. 41, 14 October 1835, pp. 677–682
- Deutschlands schöne Literatur der Gegenwart und Zukunft. Eine Rede an das gesammte deutsche Lese-Publicum, Reutlingen 1836
- Wegweiser durch Göttingen und seine Umgegend, Stuttgart 1837 (Taschenbibliothek für Reisende auf Eisenbahnetth-century musicologistsh-century musicologistsn, Dampfschiffen und Eilwägen, vol. 8)
