= Anglaise (dance) =

Historic term for English folk dances

Anglaise (French for English), also known as anglois and angloise, was a term used loosely in the late 17th and 18th centuries to refer to any of the English folk dance types. The term was predominantly used in Continental Europe and was most often applied to the country dance. However, the word anglaise was also used to refer to other English dance forms like the jig, the hornpipe, and even the Scottish reel. European composers wrote music for the anglaise until the end of the 18th century. The anglaise inspired the development of the French contredanse, and the anglaise dance has also been called contredanse anglaise; particularly in dances using a traditional English longways formation.

== History ==
The term anglaise was first adopted in the court of Louis XIV; with the English country dance introduced to the French court in 1684. These dances were first known in England after 1550 and were social dances for multiple couples that used formations like a circle or line dance. The novelty and cheer these dances provided inspired enthusiasm among the younger French nobility, and English folk dances became a popular form of recreational activity in the French court. The anglaise dance was popular in part because they were group dances that accommodate any number of people. In French practice, dancers were expected to have memorized the steps, hand holds, and passes to a particular anglaise prior to attending a ball, and only those who knew the dance were allowed to participate.

The popularity of the anglaise in the French court led to experimentation of mixing English and French dance steps and styling which led to the development of the contredanse; with possibly the earliest created by André Lorin in c. 1686. A large number of music compositions in English dance forms were created by the French dancing-masters. The Parisian bookseller Christophe Ballard published Suite de danses … qui se joüent ordinairement aux bals chez le Roy (1699) which contained 17 contredanses anglaises. Music for anglaise dances were composed into the end of the 18th century.

The music for the anglaise dance tended to be simple but strongly accented; particularly on the first beat of each measure. They could be written in duple or triple metre, and could be in either simple or compound metre. Composers would sometimes use the anglaise as a movement in a larger work, such as Étienne-Bernard-Joseph Barrière's String quartet, op.3 no.2 (1778) where the anglaise is the third movement of the piece. The anglaise was also included in staged works such as François-Joseph Gossec's opera Le triomphe de la République, ou Le camp de Grandpré (1794).

The anglaise dance spread from the French court across Europe. By 1717 the anglaise dance was immensely popular in the city of Vienna, with Lady Mary Wortley Montagu noting that Viennese balls always concluded with English country dances "to the number of 30 or 40 couples and so ill danced that there is little pleasure in them". Overtime the Viennese anglaise adopted its own unique structure and style; utilizing a suite form with multiple changes in metre. In the Baroque period German composers like Johann Sebastian Bach and Georg Philipp Telemann used the term anglaise to refer to a type of fast dance movement used as a section within certain orchestral or harpsichord suites. Examples of this would be the fourth movement in Bach's Suite No. 3 in B minor, BWV 814 and the third movement in Telemann's Ouverture in F♯ minor for strings and basso continuo.

German writers on music like Johann Mattheson, Heinrich Christoph Koch, and Daniel Gottlob Türk also used the term anglaise to refer to the English ballad as well as English folk dances.

== Publications on anglaise ==
In 1752 the Flemish music publisher Benoît Andrez published a methodology book for creating or arranging new contredanse and angloise dances, Méthode pour dresser les nouvelles contredances françoises et angloises. He also published a six volume collection of contredanses anglaises, Recueil de contredances angloises. In his Versuch einer Anleitung zur Composition (1782–1793), the German music theorist Heinrich Christoph Koch outlined the plan and characteristic details of the anglaise as a form of topical music analysis; doing the same for other classical forms like the gavotte, bourrée, polonaise, and minuet among others.

The Swedish musicologist Daniel Fryklund had a large collection of historic music manuscripts from the city of Marseilles, and he authored a paper on anglaise from that city, Editions anglaises de la Marseillaise (1936, Hälsingborg).
