= Hermann Mendel =

German musicologist

Hermann Mendel (6 August 1834 – 26 October 1876) was a German musicologist.

He founded the Musikalisches Conversations-Lexikon, which was published in Berlin from 1870 on and was further edited by August Reissmann (1825-1903) after Mendel's death. His Taschenliederbuch with texts of more than 500 German songs reached countless editions.

Mendel died probably in Berlin at the age of 42.

== Work ==
- Otto Nicolai. Eine Biographie, Berlin: Hermann Mendel 1866 (Numerized) – 2nd edition Berlin: Ludwig Heimann 1868 (Numerized)
- Giacomo Meyerbeer. Eine Biographie, Berlin: Ludwig Heimann 1868 (Numerized)
- Deutsches Taschen-Liederbuch; Mode, Berlin 1917, 93. Aufl.

Founded by Hermann Mendel, continued by August Reissmann:

- Musikalisches Conversations-Lexikon, Vol. 1, edited by Hermann Mendel, Berlin: Ludwig Heimann 1870, (Numerized) – 2. Ausg. 1880
- Musikalisches Conversations-Lexikon; Vol. 2. Oppenheim, Berlin 1872, 2. Ausg. 1880
- Musikalisches Conversations-Lexikon; Vol. 3. Oppenheim, Berlin 1873, 2. Ausg. 1880
- Musikalisches Conversations-Lexikon, Vol. 4, edited by Hermann Mendel, Berlin: Robert Oppenheim 1874 (Numerizedt) – 2. Ausg. 1880
- Musikalisches Conversations-Lexikon; Vol. 5. Oppenheim, Berlin 1875, 2. Ausg. 1880
- Musikalisches Conversations-Lexikon; Vol. 6. Oppenheim, Berlin 1876, 2. Ausg. 1881
- Musikalisches Conversations-Lexikon; Vol. 7. Oppenheim, Berlin 1877, 2. Ausg. 1881
- Musikalisches Conversations-Lexikon; Vol. 8. Oppenheim, Berlin 1877, 2. Ausg. 1882
- Musikalisches Conversations-Lexikon; Vol. 9. Oppenheim, Berlin 1878, 2. Ausg. 1882
- Musikalisches Conversations-Lexikon, Vol. 10, founded by Mendel, continued by Reissmann, Berlin: Robert Oppenheim 1878 (Numerized) – 2. Ausg. 1886
- Musikalisches Conversations-Lexikon; Vol. 11. Oppenheim, Berlin 1879, 2. Ausg. 1887
- Musikalisches Conversations-Lexikon; Erg.-Bd. Oppenheim, Berlin 1883
