= Balfolk =

Type of European folk dance event

Balfolk (from French: bal folk, meaning a folk ball) is a dance event for folk dance and folk music in a number of European countries, mainly in France and Belgium, but also the Netherlands, Germany, Spain, Portugal, Italy, Switzerland, Poland, Latvia, Lithuania, and the United Kingdom - even further afield to Canada.

It is also known as folk bal or bal trad. Regional names of similar events include Fest noz (Breton) or balèti (Occitan).

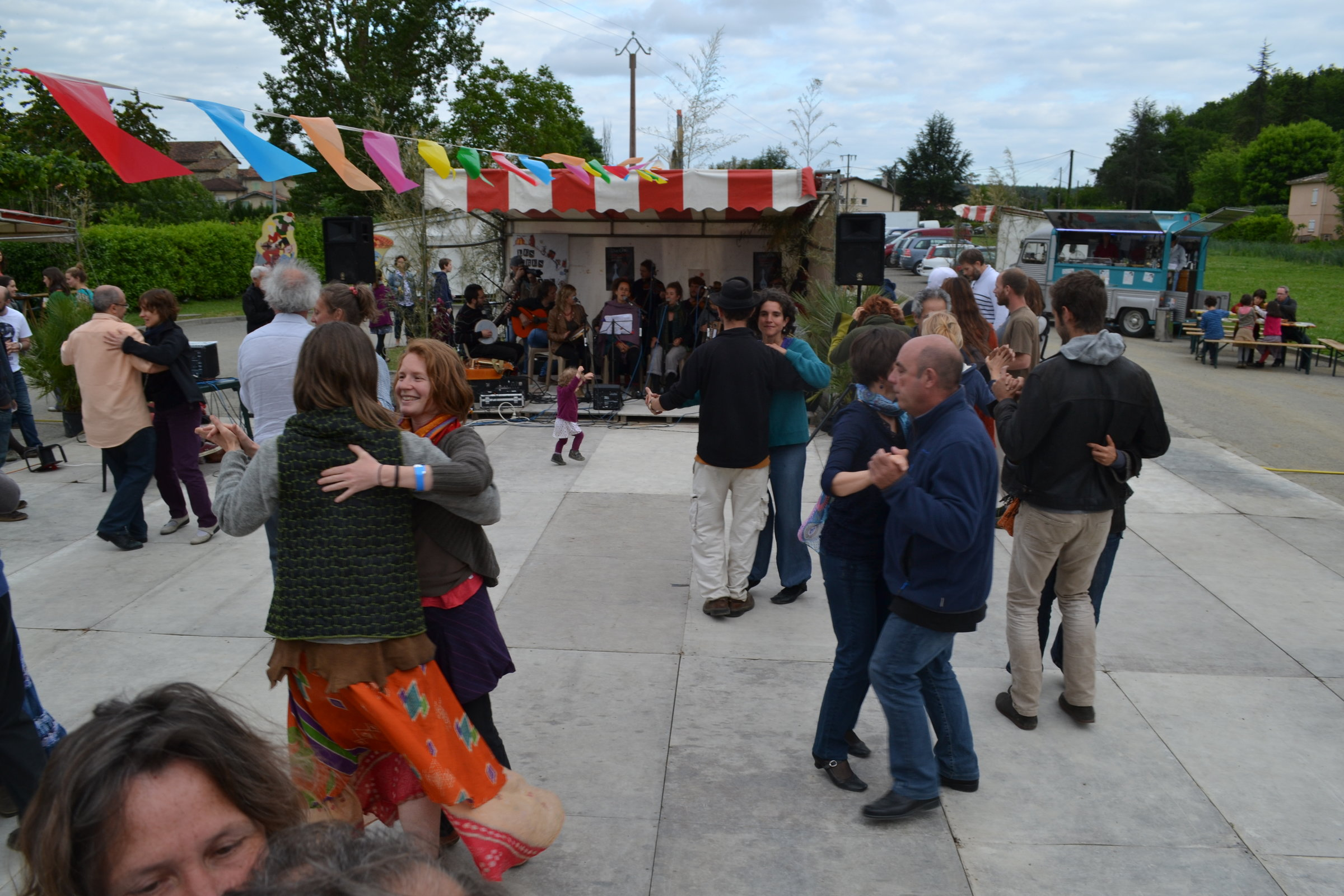
Bal deus DEM de Tolosa - Trad'envie 2015

== History ==
The traditional dances that form the basis of balfolk come primarily from the French tradition, with additions from all over Europe. Some dances originate in the Renaissance period (such as Branles, Gavottes and Farandoles), and have roots in historic popular and regional cultures in France, while others come from urbanised European ballroom or salon culture in the 19th century (such as the Waltz, Polka, Mazurka, etc.). This is often referred to as Eurobal. The 21ˢᵗC genre includes French and Breton styles, sometimes Scandi (ie Swedish) and rarely Belgian and Danish dances. Breton dances like An Dro, and Hanter dro (and more niche variations) are popular. Sometimes referred to as chain dances or farandoles, dancing side by side with footwork that moves ultimately leftward.

After waning considerably in the 19th century, due to industrialisation and rural-to-urban migration, the steps and techniques of folk and traditional dances were saved thanks in part to archivists and researchers such as Jean-Michel and Hélène Guilcher, who were active in documenting folk dances between 1941 and 1976.

Dancing to folk music has been gaining popularity since the 1970s, in the wake of the May '68 protests in France. Balfolk are part of a wider folk music revival movement beginning in the 1960s, including musical groups such as Mélusine and Malicorne, Breton-language Tri Yann and Alan Stivell, and Occitan-language Nadau.

In France, the folk club 'Le Bourdon' in Paris, opened in 1969, was one of the first places balfolks were organised regularly. The club 'La Chanterelle' in Lyon was also another centre for early balfolks.

== Description ==
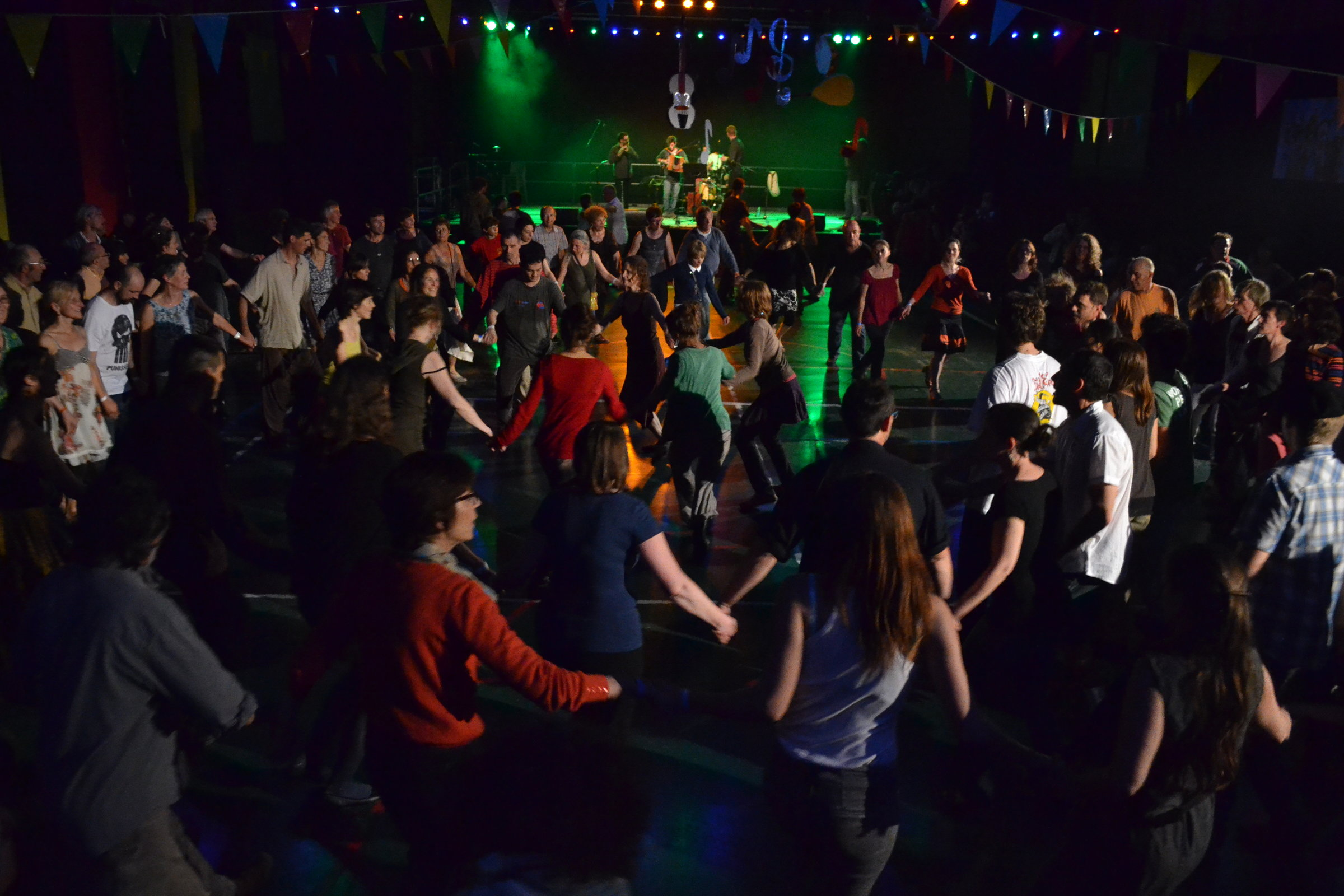
A bal folk in Auch, France (2015)

There are numerous organizations that arrange balfolks monthly, and at many folk festivals there are both concerts and dances. Many websites, such as Agenda Trad, and Facebook groups allow dancers and music-lovers to find balfolks close to them. Balfolk can be small, intimate affairs or vast outdoor events with many thousands of dancers, such as the annual Grand Bal de l'Europe in Gennetines, France.

Although there is often overlap, the dances of bal folk are not the same as dances danced by "stage dance / national dance" folk dance groups. Balfolk dances are audience participation events, based on simple traditional dances, gathered from all over Europe, that have easy basic steps, so that anyone can easily participate; and as well as main dances known all over the Balfolk community, local authentic traditional dances are often included in the events. Refined movements are not the main concern, participation and fun are the main aim, and improvisation is common. Music is played by live bands that either play "traditional" tunes, collected from players over the years, or new compositions for balfolk dancing. The audience can be mixed: some on the dance floor, dancing to the live music; others at the front or around the edges, who have come just to listen or watch.

By contrast, "stage / national" folk dances have more formal choreography and may be danced with traditional clothing. The preservation and/or presentation of a tradition in a "staged" way is important here, often "arranged" from original material. Music is sometimes played live, sometimes pre-recorded. The audience (who may even be seated) is more clearly separated from the dancers, who may be presented as cultural displays at folklore festivals, village fetes, and other cultural events. These are essentially historical re-enactments, and typically what most of the public think of as "Folk dancing" in countries like France, where the public might only be exposed to folk dancing at the village fete. Confusingly, the term bal trad does not refer to this type of traditional dancing, but is instead a synonym of balfolk, used fairly interchangeably.

Instruments used to play live music at a balfolk can be traditional (violin, accordeon or melodeon, bagpipes, hurdy gurdy, graïle, flute, etc) as well as modern or classical (electric guitar, folk guitar, bass guitar, drums, brass, electronic...).

Unlike some other dancing events, it is common to change partners for each new dance. It is socially acceptable for strangers to approach each other to ask to dance. Some dances, such as mixers (see below), change partners during the course of one dance, providing opportunities to meet new dancers without needing to ask.

== Balfolk structure ==
1. Initiation/dance workshop: A balfolk may include one or more workshops for beginners or intermediates shortly before the real Bal commences. Often the workshops are also accompanied by live music.
2. Bal: one or more folk musicians or folk music groups play for dancing. The line-up of different dances may be shared in advance or announced by microphone just before each new dance begins. Unless there is a 'theme' (for example, a 'mazurka' evening) dances are usually alternated.
3. Jam: after certain bals, dancers who brought an instrument sit in the middle of the dance floor and play tunes for the dancers. This is a more relaxed atmosphere, where musicians can feel free to improvise or try out new material, and dancers may sometimes request certain dances.

=== Common dances ===
The types of dance which are commonly included during such a session:

- Schottische (couples)
- Bourrée (in double or triple time)
- Waltz
- Polka
- Branle (circle or line dance)
- Contra dance (couples in lines)
- Mazurka (also known as Belgian or Flemish Mazurka as there is a difference from the original Mazurka)
- Polska (originally scandinavian)
- Chapelloise, also known as a Gigue (a different dance from the Irish Jig)
- The "Circassienne circle", a mixer (progressive) dance where partners regularly change throughout. English Circassian does not traditionally progress.
- Breton dances like the "Ridée", "Laridé", "Andro", "Hanter Dro" and "Kost ar c'hoat", often danced in lines linked by holding hands or little fingers.
- Ronds (many also from Brittany, but also from other parts of France, e.g. Occitania and Poitou)
- Farandole (line dance, from Provence)
- Gavottes (such as Gavotte de l'Aven)

== By country or region ==
=== Brittany ===
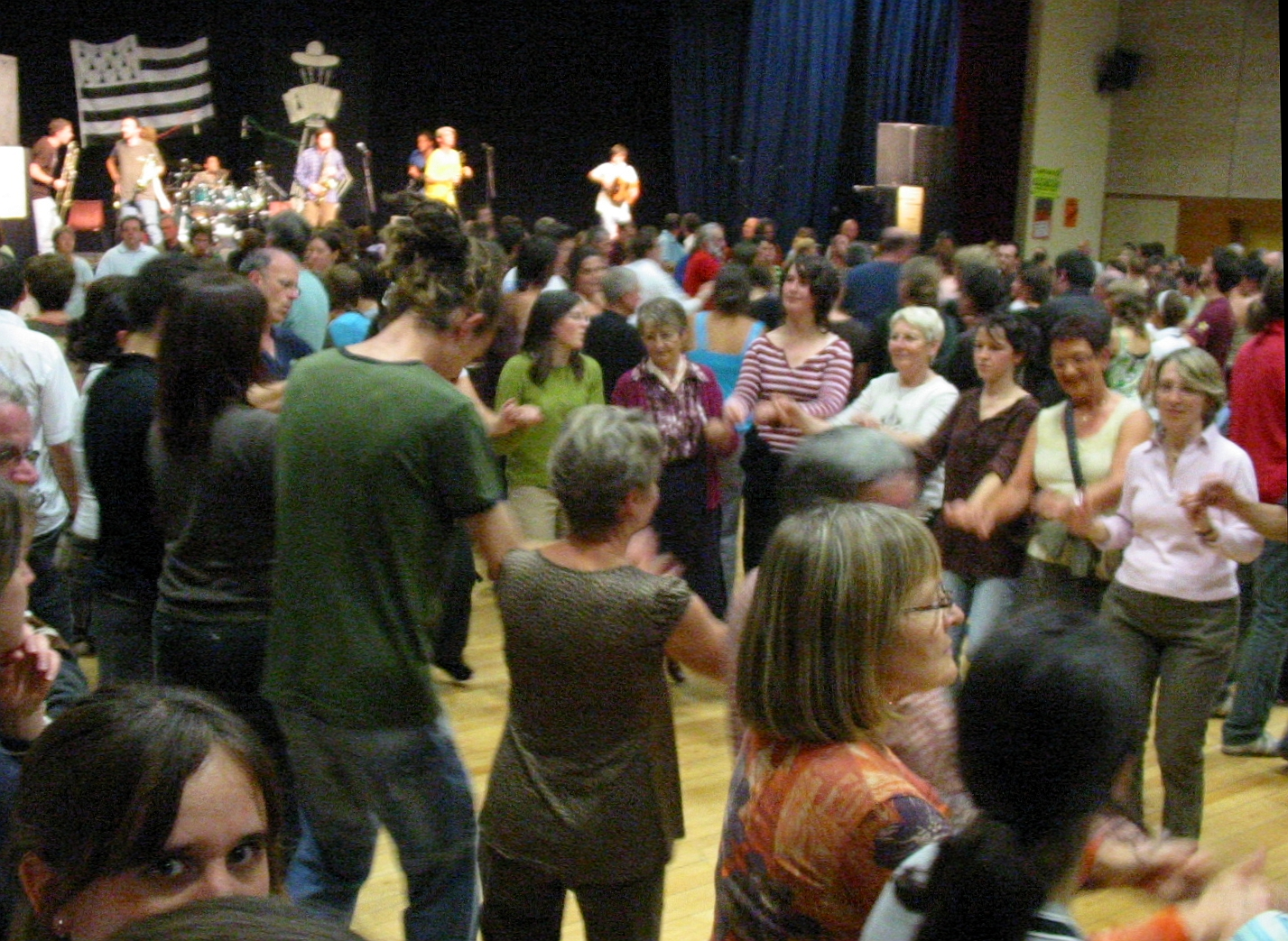
Fest noz at the Mill Góll Festival in Pays Gallo (2007)

In the region of Brittany, a specific type of balfolk exists called a Fest-noz (sometimes called Bal breton in French). These feature majoritarily Breton traditional dances (see above), although dances from elsewhere may also be danced. They are closely associated with the Breton language revival movement, and mainly feature musical groups that sing in Breton. Fest noz are very popular in Brittany, with 1,130 taking place between October 2018 and September 2019 alone.

In 2012, the tradition of the fest-noz was included in UNESCO's list of intangible cultural heritage.

=== Belgian Flanders ===
In Flanders, Boombal is the biggest balfolk organization. Because of their role in the popularization of balfolk in Ghent, where Boombal takes place, the term Boombal is more known than the term balfolk among the general Belgian population. Among balfolk dancers the term balfolk is widely accepted and used. There are plenty of other organisations beside Boombal in Belgium organising balls including in Ghent.

=== Nouvelle Aquitaine ===
Traditional dance "bals" from Nouvelle Aquitaine have been included in the French Ministry of Culture's Inventory of intangible cultural heritage. They are often components of larger annual festivals, often celebrating the local culture and history, and are also known colloquially as bal occitan or bal gascon in this region. They can also be organised by students, as well as smaller associations. Similarly to the general balfolk trend, interest in the bals grew during the period 1975-1980, but saw a drop in popularity after 1990. Nevertheless, balfolks continue to be practiced, currently with around 100 dancers per bal.
