= Chapelloise =

European folk dance

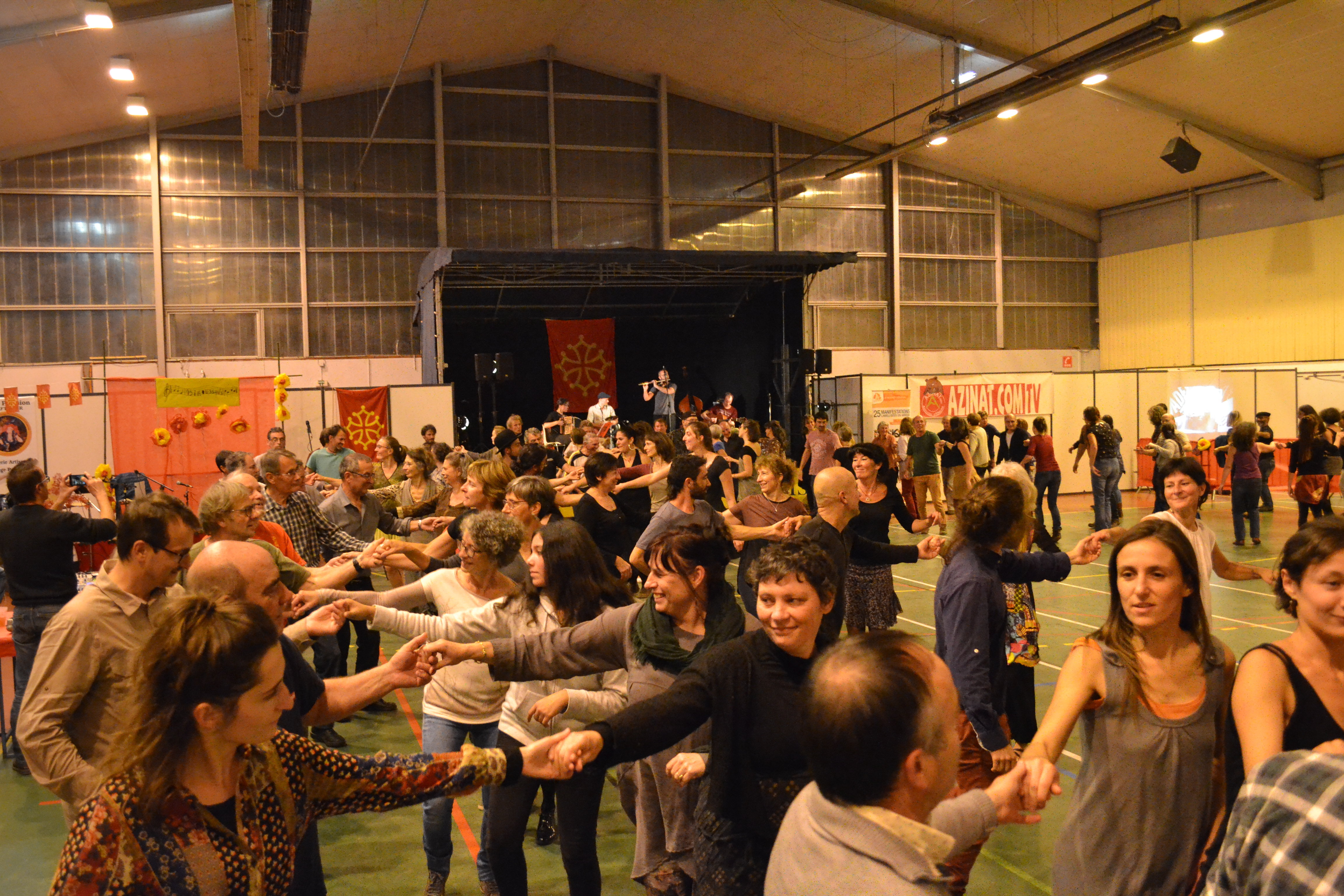
- Sur les chemins ball during Saint-Girons Nuit du Trad in 2018
- Etymology: Named after Chapelle-des-Bois
- Genre: Folk dance
- Inventor: Alick-Maud Pledge
- Year: 1930s
- Origin: France
- Related dances: All American Promenade, Gigue, Belgijka

The Chapelloise (French pronunciation: [\ʃa.pɛ.lwaz\]) is a traditional folk dance with change of partners (a so-called mixer), belonging to the standard repertoire of a Balfolk. Its most common name in France and the French-influenced European Balfolk scene is Chapelloise, but the dance has many other names in different countries.

== History ==
The French name “La Chapelloise” is derived from a village in eastern France, Chapelle-des-Bois: Legend says that André Dufresne was teaching the dance there in the 1970s, and since participants did not remember its original name, the dance got famous by the name of the village where the workshop took place.

The dance was introduced in France in the 1930s by Alick-Maud Pledge. It is often claimed that the dance is of Swedish origin and that its original name is “Aleman's marsj” (Guilcher 1998, Oosterveen 2002, Largeaud 2011 and countless websites). However, the spelling “marsj” is not Swedish (it looks rather Norwegian) and the choreography bears no similarity with Swedish folk dances. Instead, this dance is known in Scandinavian dance collections (Swedish, Danish and Norwegian) as “All American Promenade”. This, together with its dissimilarity to Swedish folk dances and its similarity to other mixer dances in Britain and America, pinpoint rather to a non-Swedish origin of the dance. The Norwegian dance collector Hulda Garborg (1862-1934) is reported to have learnt the dance in the US and brought it to Norway, but its description in a Scandinavian language was published much later. The association of the dance with Sweden stems perhaps from the fact that in Denmark, the All American Promenade is most often danced to a Swedish tune: Gärdeby Gånglåt, attributed to the Swedish fiddler Hjort Anders Olsson (1865-1952).

Sometimes it is claimed that the “All American Promenade” was choreographed in the 1960s by Jim Arkness; but a description of this dance was published already in 1953 and the dance is probably derived from the British "Gay Gordons": The “Gay Gordons” dance was mentioned already in 1907, and was a popular 'old time' dance in Britain in the 1940s and 1950s, along with "The Military Two Step" (by James Finnigan) and the "Dashing White Sergeant". The "Gay Gordons" was known to all Aberdeen folk dancers in 1950. Its first eight measures are identical to the Chapelloise/AAP, but the “Gay Gordons” lacks the change of partners which is typical for the Chapelloise/AAP.

In Belgium and the Netherlands, the dance is sometimes called “Jig”/“Gigue” after the music sometimes played to the dance or “Aapje” (an acronym for “All American Promenade”, AAP). In Belgium, it is most commonly danced to "'t Smidje" by Laïs, a modern rendition of a 19th century Flemish folk song.

In Poland, beside Chapelloise, there is a variant of this dance known as Belgijka (meaning "Belgian dance") which is usually danced to "'t Smidje" by Laïs. It is widely popular in the country and often performed during the Studniówka. Events are held to beat the Polish record for the most people performing Belgijka at once.

== Description ==
The Chapelloise being danced at Pinewoods Dance Camp in Massachusetts, U.S.

The dance is a mixer in which participants progress through a series of partners. The formation is a circle. Lark-role dancers begin on the inside of the circle and robin-role dancers on the outside. The music is lively 16-bar jigs.

The first part of the dance begins with couples taking three steps forward counterclockwise around the circle. On the fourth step, they turn around but continue moving counterclockwise (such that they are stepping backwards) for another four steps. They then reverse direction, walking forward (clockwise) for three steps. On the fourth step, they turn again and walk backwards (still clockwise) for another four steps.

In the second part of the dance, couples spring together, then apart. The lark then rolls away the robin. Finally, couples form an arch with their joined hands, and the robin steps through it to the outside of the circle to progress to a new partner. The sequence repeats for the length of the tune.

In British ceilidh and Eurobal circles we refer to it as a "progressive" dance, using the term mixer only if the dancers are less familiar with the genre. Circassienne (Circassian in English dancing) is also "progressive" in that the partner (traditionally female) begins on the left for the first time, moving on next time. At French dance festivals (eg Genntines) both Chapelloise and Circassienne will often get danced as many as 4 times in one night's dance.

== External links to dance descriptions ==
- in French: La Chapelloise
- in American: All American Promenade
- video of the Carolina Promenade, (Folk Process?)
- video of Chapelloise at a Eurobal in the UK
- Le Grand Bal de l'Europe, aka Gennetines. Quite a large 2 week long festival run by volunteers (and very professional it is)
