= War'l Leur =

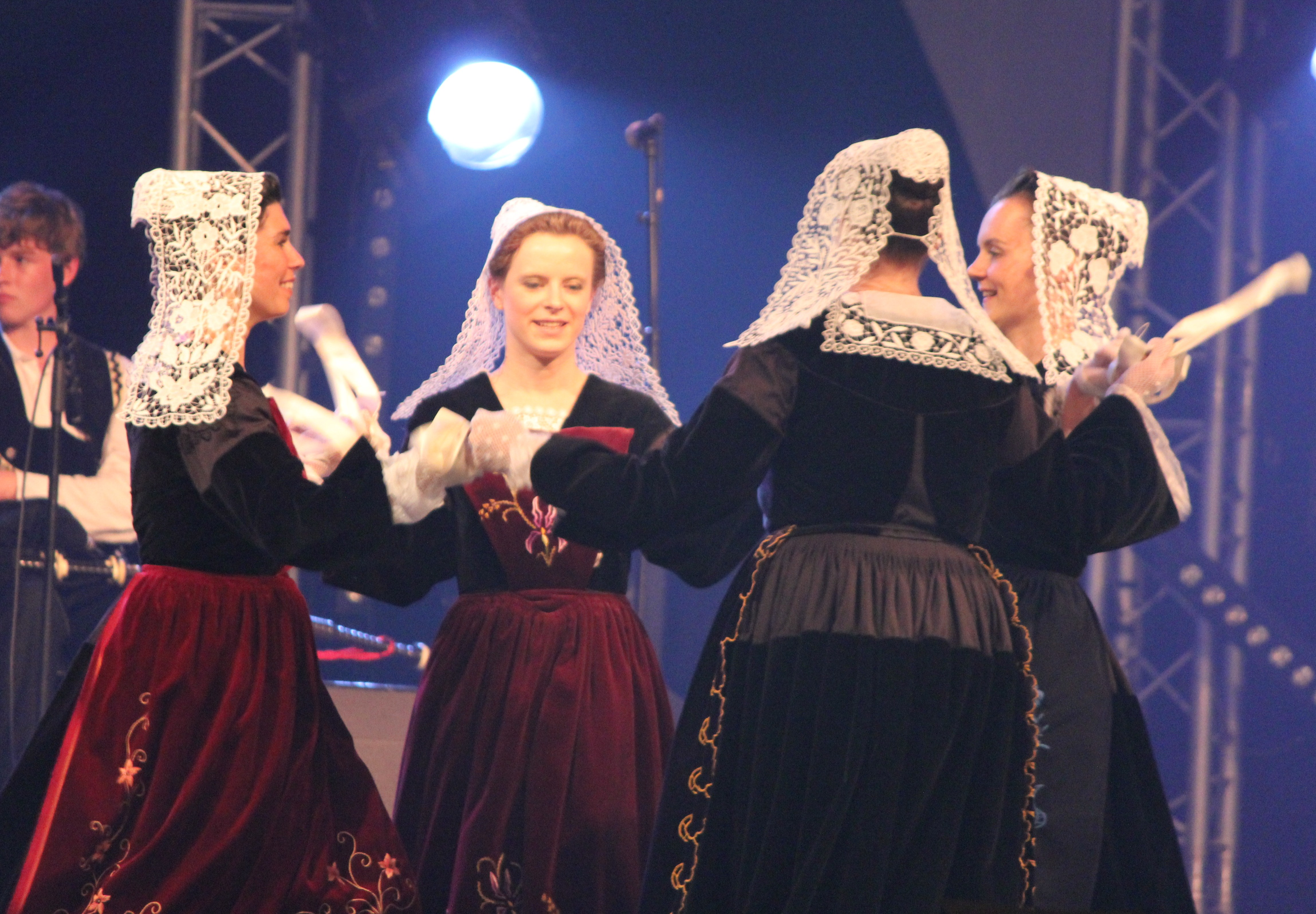
Celtic Circle from Melrand during the Festival Interceltique de Lorient 2011.

War'l Leur (literally "on the ground" in Breton language, as heard "on the area to be danced") is a confederacy of Celtic circles established in late 1967. Other confederacy in Brittany is Kendalc'h. The association gathers a large number of groups of Breton traditional dance which propose shows and animations throughout the Brittany region, in particular in summer, but also elsewhere in France, Europe and abroad.

The federation War'l Leur also aims collecting, studying and transmitting the arts and the popular traditions in Brittany. So it proposes every year internships of dance, music, singings, embroidery, as well as exposures and conferences. It also organizes festivals and parties, in Brittany and elsewhere, including the summer.

== Organisation ==
War'l Leur counts about 10,000 associate members of several associations (nearly 100 groups with the leisure Circles). The groups are divided in 6 federations (in Brittany and one outside).

Every year, a champion is elected by the federation. Unlike the other federation, there is here no contest but a continuous assessment of the groups called "views". This system requires for the Circles to always have to present the best possible show, every release can be or not judged by one or several viewers. For viewers, the main part stays before any the respect for the dance and for the costume but also the respect between the groups where the emulation and the mutual aid dominate widely on the competition and the competitors.
