= Kendalc'h =

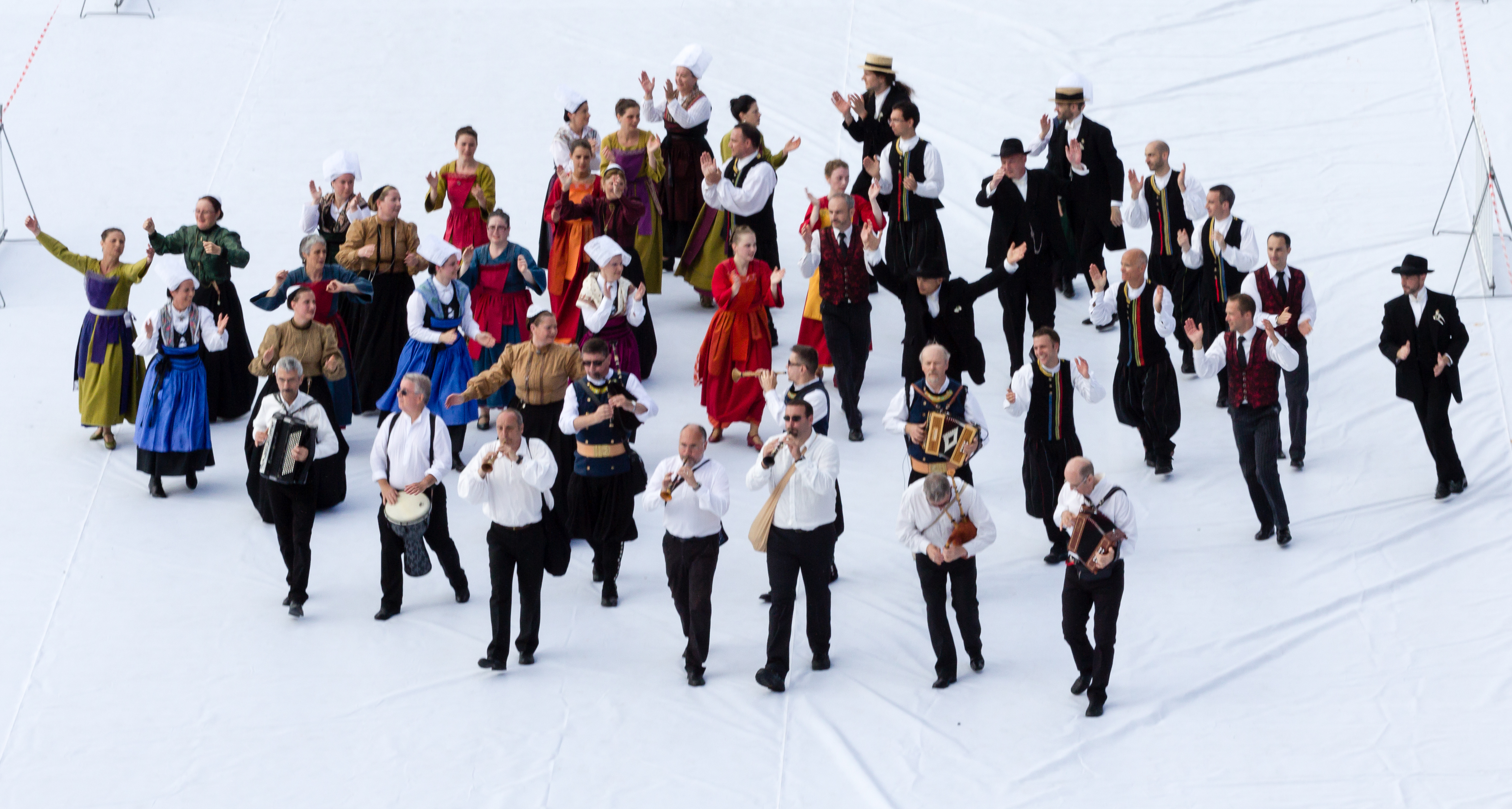
Kendalc'h Île-de-France at the Festival Interceltique de Lorient 2012

Kendalc'h (in Breton, literally "preservation" or continuity), is a confederacy of Celtic circles formed late 1950 in Quimper (Brittany). Kendalc'h promotes the Breton culture by means of the popular arts, based on eight radiuses of action: dance, costume, stage, street, youth, formation, music and publishing. It counts 180 Breton associations today (among which 30 outside Brittany), approximately 13,000 members, working in the domains of the Breton dance and the choral singing in Breton language. The other confederacy of Circles in Brittany is War'l Leur.
