= Bleuniadur =

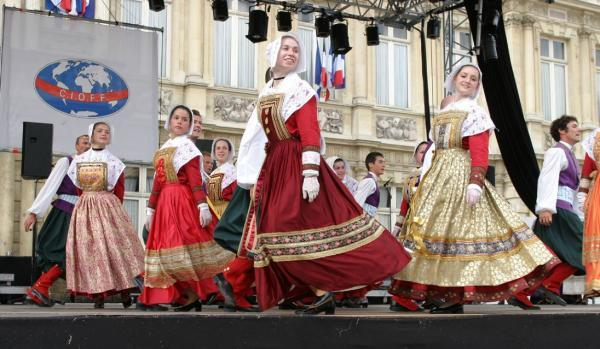
Bleuniadur, Folk Art Ensemble, in CIOFF festival in 2004

The Bleuniadur Ensemble is a Breton ballet of music and dance, founded in Saint-Pol-de-Léon (North of Brittany, France) in 1978. Bleuniadur means "blossom" in the Breton language. The word exactly describes the dynamic movement of the flower when it opens ("flowering").

This group of popular arts and traditions of Léon represents the strong cultural identity of the region of Leon as well as its openness to the world, between tradition and modernity. The group possesses 2500 costumes tracing the history of the region through the centuries.

== Presentation ==
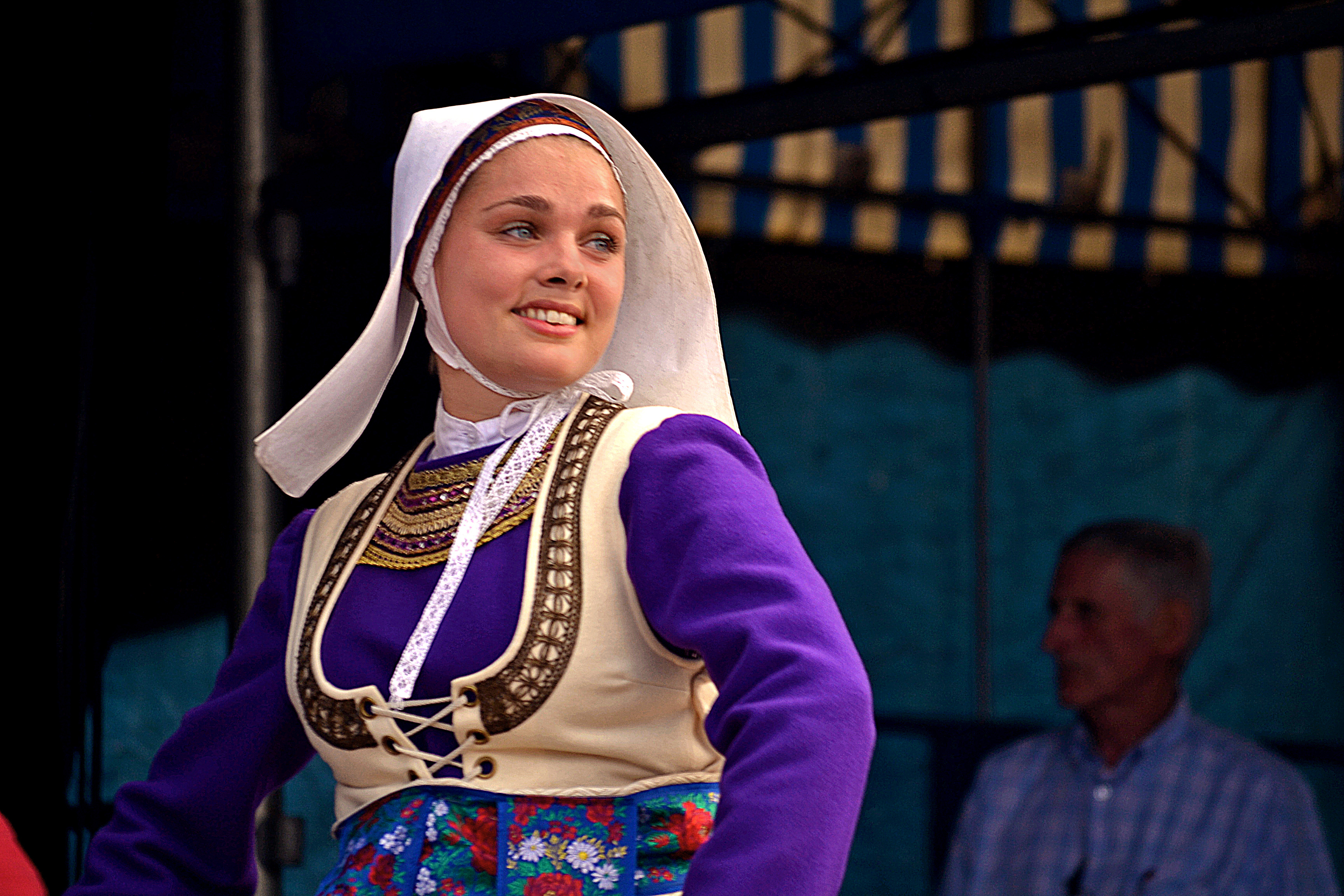
Folk costume of Léon.

At first it orientated its cultural development policy on the research of tunes and dances of its area and the production of Breton dancing shows based on the elements that had been found.
1984 marks the beginning of a second period of development for Bleuniadur. The group extended its activities (dancing school for children, adults beginners class, monitors training, intensive courses on singing, music and costumes, lectures on folklore), which have established the group as a regional ballet federating various Leon towns. Progressively, these developments led the group to evolve its policy towards dancing shows. Bleuniadur wanted to be closer to the traditional expression in order to highlight the Breton spirit in its most authentic and entrancing character.

It began to take part in international festivals in 1996. Bleuniadur has three groups: one of children, one of youngsters and the "elite" group. The group is mostly young with an average age of 22 years. The group tries at the same time to have strong and deep roots and to be modern. The main challenge is to keep the folk dance and music alive with their particularities. The group won major prizes in Brittany, France and Europe : winner in 2000 of the Bagadañs Trophee of the best Breton Ensemble, won many times the French National Championship (2001, 2007, 2008, 2009), prizes in Strzegom, in Kolobrzeg, at the Zakopane International Folklore Competition... Bleuniadur took part in major CIOFF festivals in France and Europe (Germany, England, Italy, Switzerland, Belgium, Austria, Czechoslovakia, Wales, Paraguay, Czech Republic, Poland, Romania...). It has organized a U.S. tour in 2006 and participated at Folkmoot USA festival (North Carolina).

== Show ==
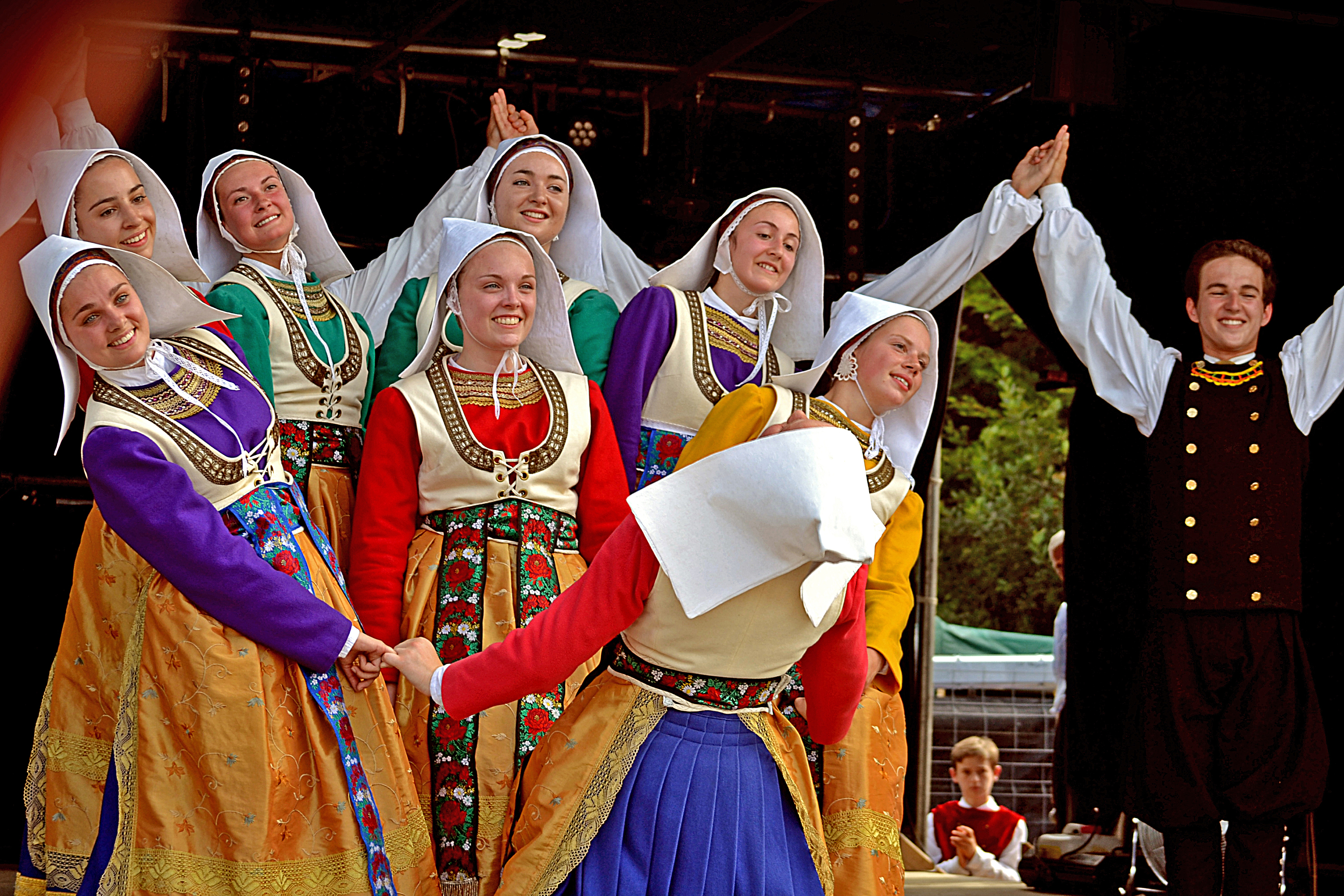
Show Strujuz! (fertile, dazzling) in 2015.

The Celtic circle masters one of the largest repertoire of traditional dances in Brittany. It presents both dances from upper Brittany (French-speaking culture) and western Brittany (Breton-speaking culture). It is one of the very rare group mastering at the same time dances from the early twentieth century, which are commonly danced in Brittany, and the steps and forms of mid-nineteenth century dances.

Its wardrobe, composed of authentic or recreated pieces, is one of the best stocked in Brittany. The Bleuniadur collection is rich of more than a two thousand costumes in the clothing custom of Leon and Cornouaille. The group presents the evolution of the four customs in Saint-Pol-de-Léon over about 150 years.

The traditional musics accompanying are interpreted as in the traditional setting initial.

"In Bleuniadur's performances, audiences are sure to be thrilled with the opportunity to experience the Celtic traditions of Brittany, which are very distinct from the folklore of other regions of France." CIOFF

== Discography (DVD) ==
- 2006 : Ololé (onomatopoeia used by shepherds)
- 2007 : Lusk ha lamm (Rhythm and jump), creation of the celtic circle and bagad Plougastell
- 2008 : Kala Maé (Kalends of May)
