= 't Smidje =

Single by Laïs

from the album Laïs
- Language: Dutch
- Recorded: 1998
- Genre: Folk
- Length: 2:56
- Label: Alea
- Songwriters: Trad. Arr.: Laïs / Kadril

"'t Smidje" ("The Little Blacksmith") is a single by the Belgian singing trio band Laïs in Dutch from 1998.

It is a traditional song that has its origins in Flemish medieval music. The same text had previously been set to music by Miek en Roel & Roland in the song "Wie wil horen". The song became popular in Spain and in Poland, where it is known as "Taniec Belgijski" ("Belgian Dance") or "Belgijka" ("The Belgian"). In 2008, it ranked 42nd, which was 11 places better than the previous year; in 2011 it was in 65th place and in 2012 in 83rd place.

The second song on their debut single was "De wereld vergaat", which appeared on the self-titled album from 1998.

In 2020, the Georgian group Trio Mandili recorded a cover version of "'t Smidje".

== Personnel ==
- Producer:
  - Erwin Libbrecht
- Musicians:
  - Annelies Brosens (vocals)
  - Bart De Cock (bagpipes, nyckelharpa)
  - Dirk Verhegge (electric guitar)
  - Erwin Libbrecht (guitar)
  - Hans Quaghebeur (accordion, hurdy-gurdy, piano)
  - Harlind Libbrecht (dulcimer, mandolin)
  - Jacques Vandevelde (harp)
  - Jorunn Bauweraerts (vocals)
  - Mario Vermandel (bass guitar)
  - Nathalie Delcroix (vocals)
  - Peter Libbrecht (violin)
  - Philippe Mobers (drum kit, percussion)
