= Boombal =

Boombal (pl. Boombals) is a relatively recent phenomenon of folk dance parties in Belgium, originating in the French bal folk. The partygoers indulge in pair, ring, line, and string dances such as the waltz, polka, An Dro, etc. adapted from the French bal folk scene. The events are seen as a more social and enjoyable alternative to the individualistic dancing that is often seen in modern clubs. There is a very low barrier of entrance due to the emphasis on having fun rather than meticulously performed and complicated dances.

== History ==
Boombal originated in Ghent, Belgium when accordion instructor Wim Claeys wanted his students to play to a real dance audience. The first Boombal was organised in September 2000 in an old furniture shop, with about 5 couples participating. This shop was located in the Boomstraat (lit. tree-street), which is how the event got its name. A year later, the Boombal concept had grown immensely and with over 100 participants the event was relocated to the Volkshuis van de Dampoort in Ghent. Soon, another move was necessary to the even bigger intercultural centre 'De Centrale'.

In 2006, Boombal is an established and popular concept in Belgium, organised mostly in and around various student cities. In the Netherlands, similar events are popping up, under the name Folkbal. The idea is slowly gaining popularity in other neighbouring countries as well.

== Event ==
A Boombal typically consists of two parts:

1. Initiation

In about an hour, an instructor will demonstrate and teach various dances. Popular ones include Schottische, Gigues and Bourrées. The emphasis is on dances that can be performed with two or more people at the time.

2. Party

Professional folk musicians play live music to which the various learned dances are performed en masse. There is a lot of interplay between the audience and the musicians. A typical session lasts about two hours.
