= Alick-Maud Pledge =

English dance and gymnastics teacher (1893–1949)

- Born: 1893; London
- Died: 1949 (aged 55–56); Paris

Alick-Maud Pledge (1893–1949) was an English folk dance and gymnastics teacher in France.

== Early life ==
Alick-Maud Pledge (sometimes written as Maud Alick Pledge) was born in London.

== Career in France ==
Pledge moved to France in 1926 following the call of Jaques-Dalcroze, but became soon independent. In the New Education movement, she created the French associations Education and Movement and Friends of the Popular Dance. She popularized the Chapelloise, a folk dance, in France. She influenced Marcelle Albert, Marinette Aristow-Journoud and Jean-Michel Guilcher who carried on with teaching folk dances in France.

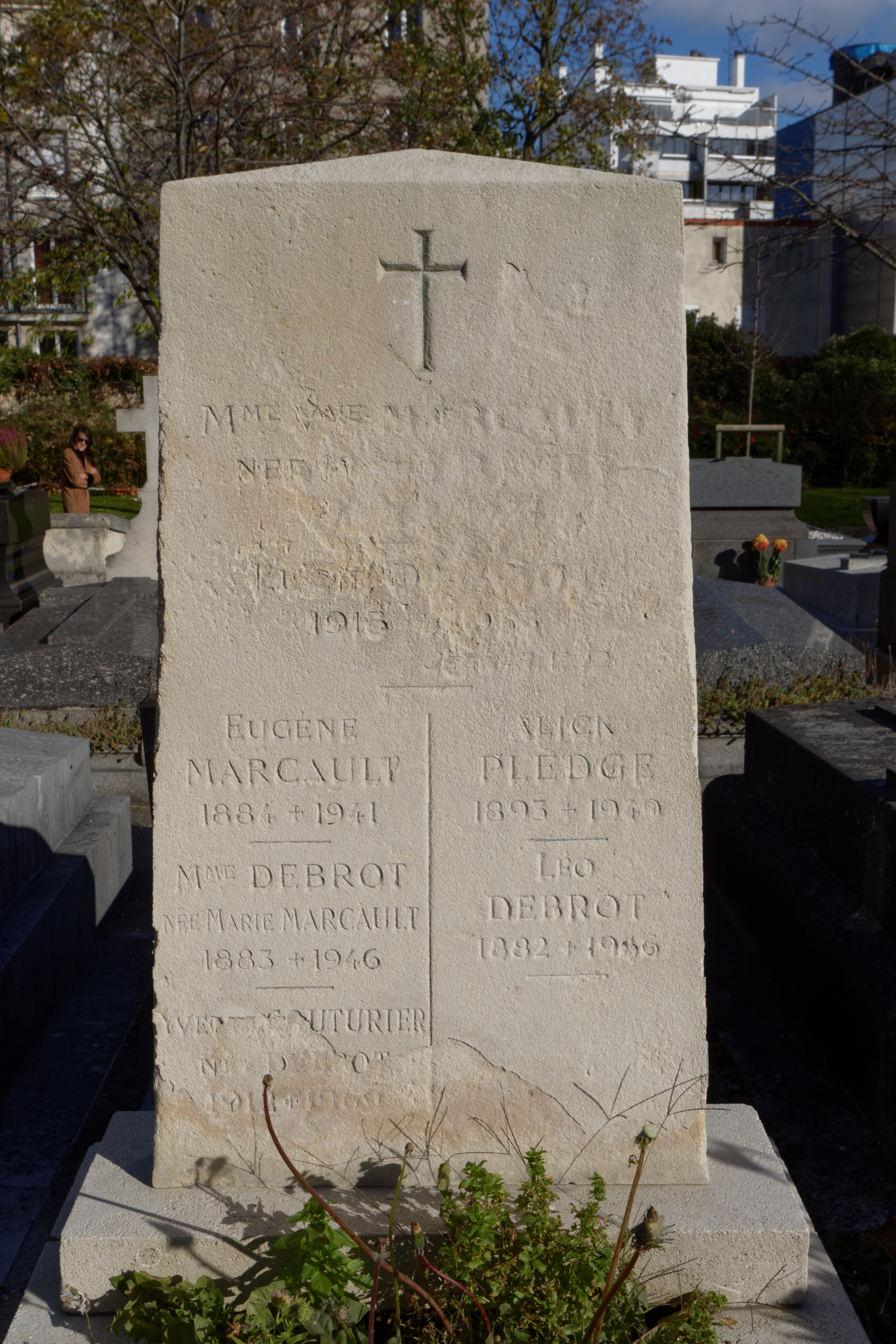
The tombstone at the grave of Alick-Maud Pledge, in Père Lachaise Cemetery in Paris. (Other names on the stone are Eugène Marcault, Marie Marcault Debrot, Yvette Couturier, and Léo Debrot.)

== Personal life ==
Pledge died in 1949, in her mid-fifties. Her gravesite is in Père Lachaise Cemetery in Paris.

== Articles ==
- « Mouvement, gymnastique et équilibre nerveux », in La Nouvelle Éducation, 1932, 3 articles pp. 9, 18 et 39.
- « La danse populaire », in La Nouvelle Éducation, 1935.

== Publications ==
- Jean-Philippe Saint-Martin. Les origines oubliées de la Gymnastique Volontaire entre les deux guerres mondiales. In SPORT ET GENRE (VOLUME 3) Apprentissage du genre et institutions éducatives. Lharmattan, 2006, 55–69.
