= Laïs (band) =

Flemish singing trio

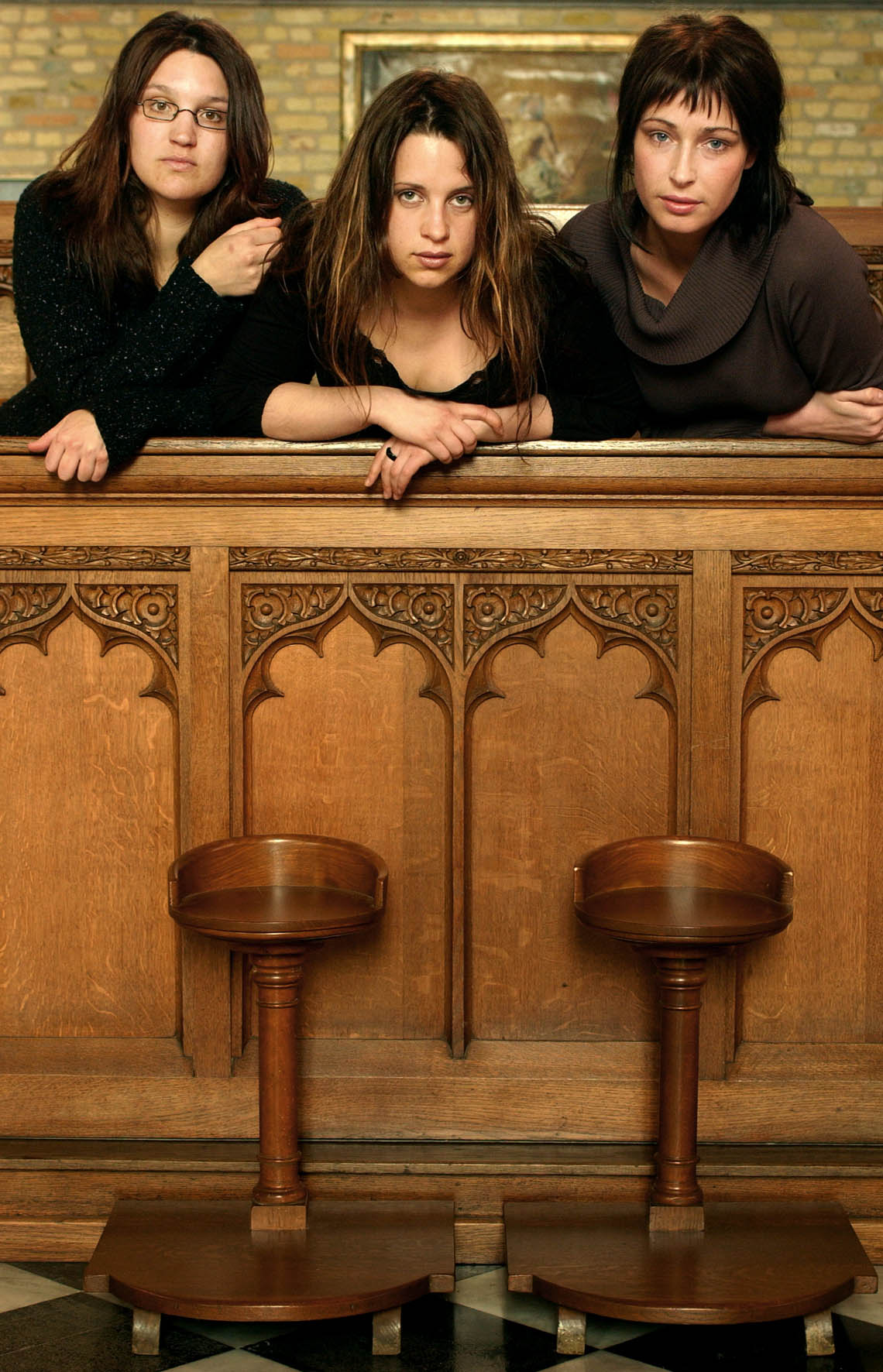
- Laïs in 2003

Background information
- Origin: Kalmthout, Belgium
- Genre: Folk
- Years active: 1994–present
- Members: Jorunn Bauweraerts; Nathalie Delcroix
- Past members: Annelies Brosens
- Website: https://www.lais.be/

Laïs is a Flemish group that creates folk, and world music consisting of polyphonic close harmony songs, occasionally a cappella, based on self-composed melodies with lyrics dating back to the Middle Ages. "Laïs" comes from the Welsh word "llais", meaning "voice".

== History ==
Laïs' career started in 1994, when Jorunn Bauweraerts and Annelies Brosens, together with Soetkin Collier (who later became a vocalist with the Belgian folk music group Urban Trad) performed a song at a folk festival in Gooik, near Brussels. Somewhat later, Collier left the group and Nathalie Delcroix joined. They had their breakthrough after their appearance at Folk Dranouter, near Ypres, in 1996.

Their debut CD album, sung a cappella as well as accompanied instrumentally by the folk rock band Kadril, was released in 1998. They performed at the Klein Karoo Nasionale Kunstefees in Oudtshoorn, South Africa (1996), at Vorst Nationaal, Belgium (1998), Canada, France (1999) (as a supporting act for Sting), Spain (1999, 2000), the Netherlands and China (2001).

During the summer of 2000 they performed at important festivals in Belgium and the Netherlands, such as Pinkpop and Rock Werchter. In 2001 they made a much acclaimed return to the festival at Dranouter.

In 2003 they made a mini tour along Flemish churches and chapels, singing a cappella with the vocal support of Ludo Vandeau. This resulted in the CD "A la capella".

In April 2004 they released their third CD to the market under the title Douce Victime, with covers from Jacques Brel and Herman van Veen. This time it not only contained a cappella songs but also Cajun music, the London Chamber Orchestra and some World Music influences. It was recorded at the legendary Abbey Road Studios in London.

With their album The Ladies' Second Song, released in September 2007, the group changed their approach and tried to reach a broader public. They could no longer be characterized as folk. The album introduces the use of electric guitars, loops and electronic beats. Their lyrics have equally undergone a thorough overhaul. Instead of drawing their lyrics from old Flemish songbooks, they have turned to poetry from William Butler Yeats, Paul Verlaine and Pablo Neruda.

In 2009 they released the album Laïs Lenski together with the cellist Simon Lenski. In September 2020, after 25 years of singing together, the group announced the departure of Annelies Brosens. Since then, Nathalie Delcroix and Jorunn Bauweraerts continue to perform as Laïs, together with their musicians.

== Members ==
The female vocal trio part of Laïs are three young women from Kalmthout:

Laïs

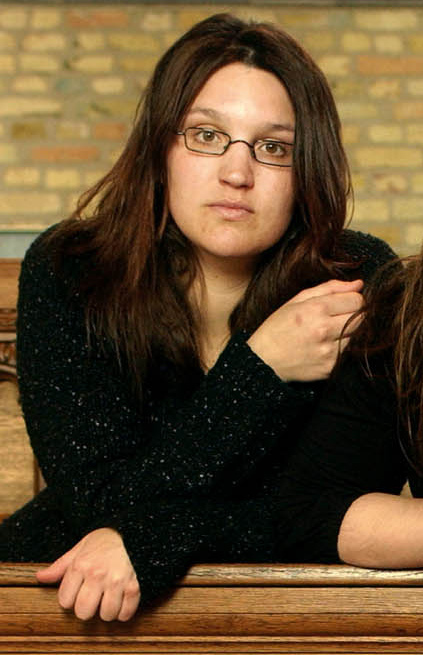
Annelies Brosens

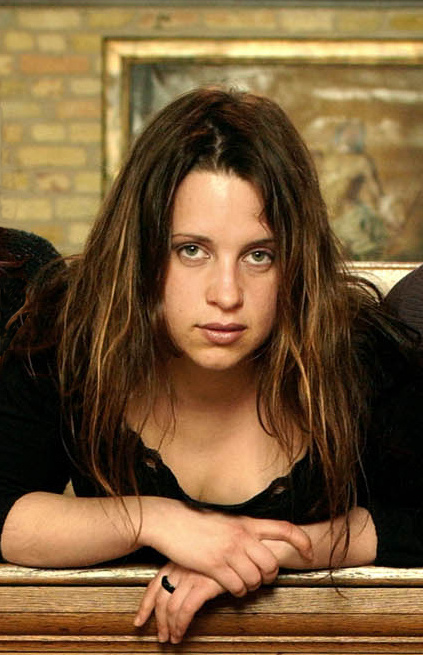
Jorunn Bauweraerts

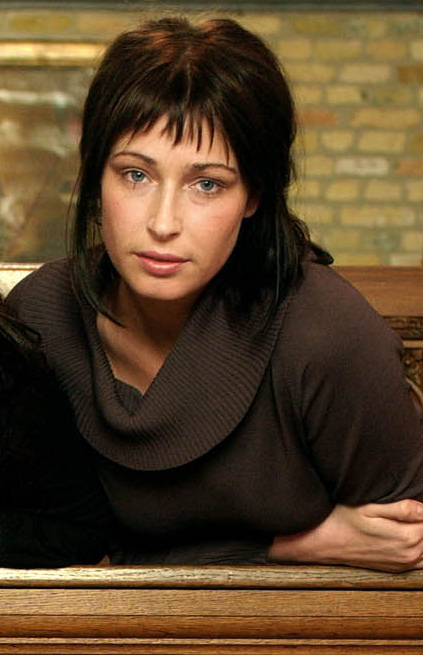
Nathalie Delcroix

They are accompanied by four men:

- Fritz Sundermann (electric and acoustic instruments, harmonium);
- Hans Quaghebeur (squeezeboxes, hurdy-gurdy, whistle);
- Ronny Reuman (percussion);
- Bart Denolf (electric and acoustic bass).

Laïs has also renewed their band:

- Elko Blijweert (guitar);
- Bjorn Eriksson (guitar, elektronica);
- Jeroen Stevens (drums);
- Filip Vandebril (contrabass);
- Dan Lacksman (synthesizer, former Telex (band), Dan Lacksman's Alliance, producer) did the mixing at the sound console.

== Discography ==
=== Albums ===
- Laïs, ALEA, 1998
- Dorothea, Virgin Music Belgium, 2000
- Dorothea ltd. ed., Virgin Music Belgium, 2001
- A la capella, Virgin Music Belgium, 2003
- Douce victime, Virgin Music Belgium, 2004
- Documenta (Compilation), EMI, 2006
- The Ladies' Second Song, 2007
- Laïs Lenski, 2009 (together with the cellist Simon Lenski)
- Midwinter tales, Own publication, 2013

=== Singles ===
- 't Smidje, ALEA, 1998
- De Ballade van Boon, EMI Belgium, 1999
- Dorothea, Virgin Music Belgium (2000)
- Le grand vent, Virgin Music Belgium, 2001
- Le renard et la belette, Virgin Music Belgium, 2002
- Rinaldo (2004)
- De Klacht van een Verstoten Minnares (2004)
- Kalima Kadara (2005)
- Qui a Tué Grand'maman (2006)
- Joskesong (2007)
- The Lady's Second Song (2007)
- In de Bleke Winterzon (2008)
