= List of Intangible Cultural Heritage elements in France =

The United Nations Educational, Scientific and Cultural Organisation (UNESCO) intangible cultural heritage elements are the non-physical traditions and practices performed by a people. As part of a country's cultural heritage, they include celebrations, festivals, performances, oral traditions, music, and the making of handicrafts. The "intangible cultural heritage" is defined by the Convention for the Safeguarding of Intangible Cultural Heritage, drafted in 2003 and took effect in 2006. Inscription of new heritage elements on the UNESCO Intangible Cultural Heritage Lists is determined by the Intergovernmental Committee for the Safeguarding of Intangible Cultural Heritage, an organisation established by the convention.

France ratified the convention on 11 July 2006. It registered its first element on the representative list in 2008.

== Intangible Cultural Heritage of Humanity ==
+ Transnational element

=== Representative List ===
Name	Image	Year	No.	Description
Processional giants and dragons in Belgium and France + (Note: Shared with Belgium.)		2008	00153	The processional giants and dragons of Belgium and France are a set of folkloric manifestations involving processional giants and dragons.
Maloya		2009	00249	Maloya is one of the two major music genres of Réunion, usually sung in Réunion Creole, and traditionally accompanied by percussion and a musical bow.
Aubusson tapestry		2009	00250	Aubusson tapestry is tapestry manufactured at Aubusson, in the upper valley of the Creuse in central France.
Scribing tradition in French timber framing		2009	00251	The art of the carpentry brings together the graphic means in use since the 13th century in France, making it possible to express through drawing and with the greatest precision the reality of the volumes of a building, their penetrations as well as the characteristics of the parts of wood which allows them to be composed.
Gastronomic meal of the French		2010	00437	
Craftsmanship of Alençon needle lace-making		2010	00438	Alençon lace or point d'Alençon is a needle lace that originated in Alençon. It is sometimes called the "Queen of lace." Lace making began during the 16th century and the local industry was rapidly expanded during the reign of Louis XIV by Jean-Baptiste Colbert, who established a Royal Workshop in the town to produce lace in the Venetian style in 1665.
Compagnonnage, network for on-the-job transmission of knowledge and identities		2010	00441	Compagnonnage refers to a traditional system of transmitting knowledge and training for a profession, which is anchored in communities of journeymen. An aspiring journeyman trains for a profession through a series of educational practices supervised by the community of journeymen he wishes to join.
Equitation in the French tradition		2011	00440	
Fest-Noz, festive gathering based on the collective practice of traditional dances of Brittany		2012	00707	A fest noz is a Breton traditional festival, with dancing in groups and live musicians playing acoustic instruments.
Limousin septennial ostensions		2013	00885	The Limousin septennial ostensions is a series of religious processions in commemoration of the relics of Roman Catholic saints in Limousin.
Gwoka: music, song, dance and cultural practice representative of Guadeloupean identity		2014	00991	Gwo ka is a French creole term for big drum. Alongside Gwotanbou, simply Ka or Banboula (archaic), it refers to both a family of hand drums and the music played with them, which is a major part of Guadeloupean folk music.
Summer solstice fire festivals in the Pyrenees + (Note: Shared with Andorra and Spain.)		2015	01073	The summer solstice fire festivals take place in the Pyrenees every year on the night of the day when the sun is at its zenith.
Carnival of Granville		2016	01077	The Carnival de Granville is a carnival which takes place every year, during the five days on the occasion of Mardi Gras, in Granville.
The skills related to perfume in Pays de Grasse: the cultivation of perfume plants, the knowledge and processing of natural raw materials, and the art of perfume composition		2018	01207	The know-how linked to perfumery in the town of Grasse.
Art of dry stone construction, knowledge and techniques + (Note: Shared with Croatia, Cyprus, Greece, Italy, Slovenia, Spain, Switzerland, Andorra, Austria, Belgium, Ireland, and Luxembourg.)		2018	02106	Dry stone is a building method by which structures are constructed from stones without any mortar to bind them together.
Alpinism + (Note: Shared with Italy and Switzerland.)		2019	01471	
Craftsmanship of mechanical watchmaking and art mechanics + (Note: Shared with Switzerland.)		2020	01560	
Musical art of horn players, an instrumental technique linked to singing, breath control, vibrato, resonance of place and conviviality + (Note: Shared with Belgium, Luxembourg, and Italy.)		2020	01581	
The art of glass beads + (Note: Shared with Italy.)		2020	01591	
Falconry, a living human heritage + (Note: Shared with Austria, Belgium, Croatia, Czechia, Germany, Hungary, Ireland, Italy, Kazakhstan, Republic of Korea, Kyrgyzstan, Mongolia, Morocco, Netherlands, Pakistan, Poland, Portugal, Qatar, Saudi Arabia, Slovakia, Spain, Syria, and the United Arab Emirates.)		2021	01708	
Bear festivities in the Pyrenees + (Note: Shared with Andorra.)		2022	01846	
Artisanal know-how and culture of baguette bread		2022	01883	
Knowledge, craft and skills of handmade glass production + (Note: Shared with Czechia, Finland, Germany, Hungary, and Spain.)		2023	01961	
Transhumance, the seasonal droving of livestock + (Note: Shared with Albania, Andorra, Austria, Croatia, Greece, Italy, Luxembourg, Romania, and Spain.)		2023	01964	Transhumance is a type of pastoralism or nomadism, a seasonal movement of livestock between fixed summer and winter pastures.
Funfair culture + (Note: Shared with Belgium.)		2024	02108	
Skills of Parisian zinc roofers and ornamentalists		2024	02105	

=== Good Safeguarding Practices ===
Name	Year	No.	Description
Craft techniques and customary practices of cathedral workshops, or Bauhütten, in Europe, know-how, transmission, development of knowledge and innovation + (Note: Shared with Germany, Austria, Norway, and Switzerland.)	2020	01558	A Bauhütten (cathedral workshop), is a structure dedicated to the construction, maintenance and restoration of a monument with a specific mode of operation, known as Bauhüttenwesen.
The Martinique yole, from construction to sailing practices, a model for heritage safeguarding	2020	01582	In Martinique, the yole was originally a boat intended for fishermen.
Tocatì, a shared programme for the safeguarding of traditional games and sports + (Note: Shared with Belgium, Croatia, Cyprus, and Italy.)	2022	01709	

=== Elements in Need of Urgent Safeguarding ===
Name	Image	Year	No.	Description
Cantu in paghjella, a secular and liturgical oral tradition of Corsica		2009	00315	The paghjella is a traditional Corsican polyphonic song, composed of six lines of eight syllables, where a rhythm is recreated with each word and creates poetry.

== See also ==
- List of World Heritage Sites in France
