= Schottische =

Partnered country dance derived from polka, of continental European origin

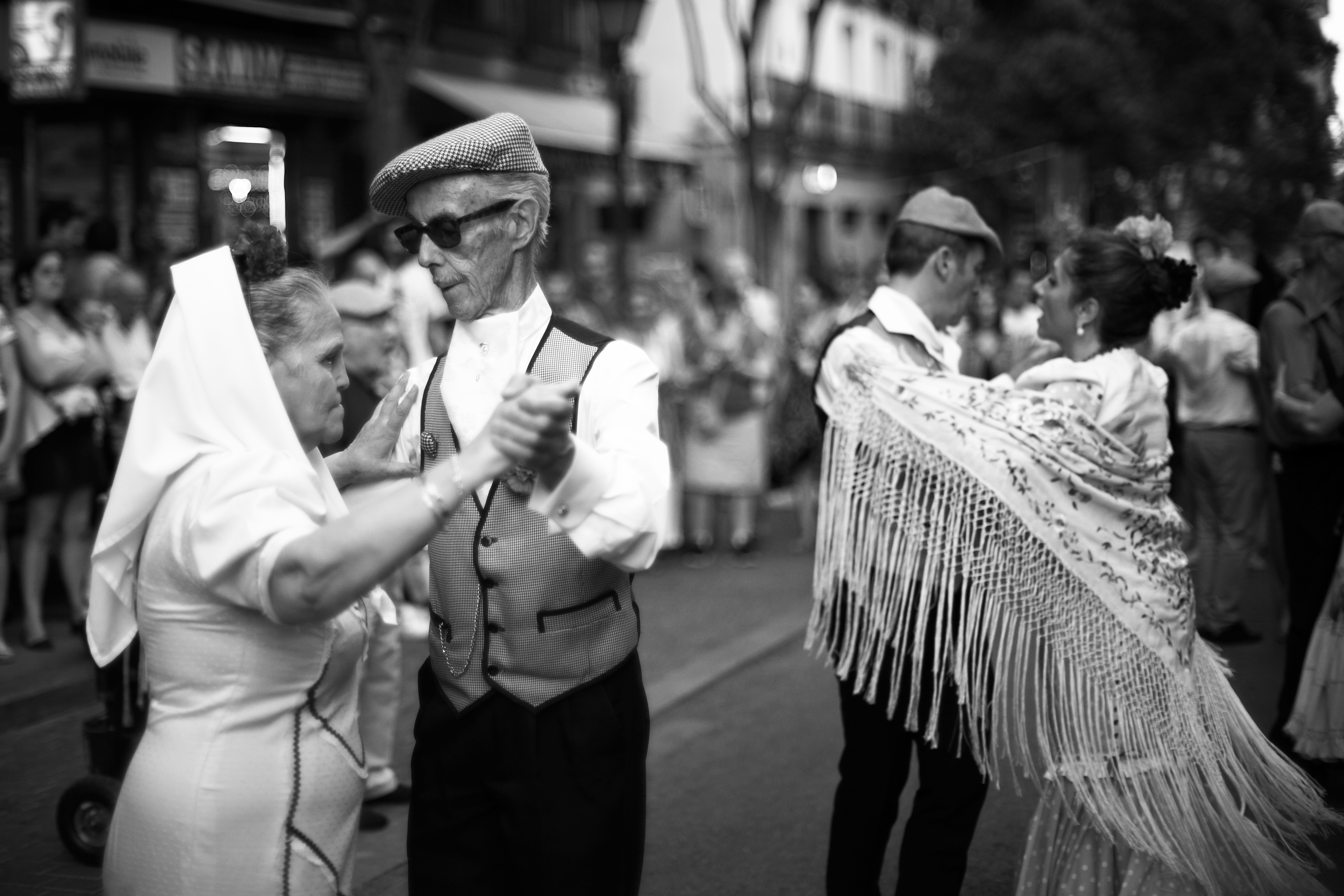
Dancers dancing the schottische (in Spanish, chotis) in Madrid, 2017

The schottische (/ʃɒˈtiːʃ/ or /ˈʃɒtɪʃ/; German for "Scottish") is a partnered country dance that apparently originated in Bohemia. It was popular in Victorian-era ballrooms as a part of the Bohemian folk-dance craze and left its traces in the folk music of various countries. The schottische is considered by The Oxford Companion to Music to be a kind of slower polka, with Continental European origins.

The basic step of the schottische is made up of two sidesteps to the left and right, followed by a turn in four steps. In some countries, the sidesteps and turn are replaced by strathspey hopping steps.

Schottisches danced in Europe (in the context of balfolk), where they originated, are different from those danced in the United States. The European or Continental version is typically danced to faster music and is quite restrained in its movements. The American version is often large and open, with a slower tempo than the European schottische. The first part is often expressed equally as promenades, individual or led twirls or similar moves, and the second part is most often expressed as a close pivot.

== Contemporary ==
=== Argentina ===
In Argentina, the schottische (chotis) was introduced by Volga German immigrants and also evolved and mixed into chamamé, an Argentine folk music genre.

=== Australia ===
Australian composers of schottische music include Christian Helleman and Henry Marsh.

=== Brazil ===
In Brazil, the schottische (xote) has largely developed in the north-eastern area, especially the Sertão, where it has created variations such as baião and arrasta-pé, which are usually grouped in the forró denomination. All of these rhythms are typically danced in pairs, being xote the slower and simpler style of dancing, in which the couple alternate left-left-hop-right-right-hop steps.

=== Czech Republic ===
In the Czech Republic, the dance was also known as šotyš. It is danced in its more traditional folk variants as an exhibition dance, and also in the balfolk scene.

=== Finland ===
In Finland the dance is generally known as a jenkka. In general, it is faster in tempo than the Norwegian reinlender and Swedish schottis.

=== France ===
The scottische was introduced in France in the 1850s. It rapidly disseminated from the salons to the countryside, becoming one of the most popular folk dances. It is one of the most common dance found in balfolk.

The schottish Espagnol or Spanish schottische, also known as the "seven step", gained popularity in France in the early 1900s.

=== Germany ===
Germans refer to the dance as a Schottisch, which means Scottish. The Northern Rheinländer and Bavarian/Austrian Boarisch are closely related.

=== Italy ===
A dozen variations are known, for one or more couples, some free, some in fixed choreographies, and the original name became "sciortis" in Tuscany, "sciotzè" in southern Italy, "sòtis" in Romagna, "scozië" in Apulia.

=== Ireland ===
In the folk music of Ireland, a schottische is closely related to the highland tune type, though possessing a higher proportions of quarter notes. The so-called "German schottische", like the highland, was chiefly popular in Donegal and in Irish exile communities, notably Philadelphia, where Donegal emigrants settled. Also known as a "barn dance", the "German" is a two-hand dance played to tunes that end each eight-bar phrase with three lightly accented quarter notes.

=== Mexico ===
Known as chotís, it was introduced in México in 1850. In the beginning it was just a high-class ballroom dance. It became popular after a while and then a more "rustic" style was created for public parties and dance halls. It is popular in the northern states of Nuevo León, Tamaulipas, Durango and Zacatecas.

=== Norway ===
In Norway, the dance is called a reinlender. The name may suggest an origin in the area of the Rhine.

=== Philippines ===
The dance was introduced to the islands during the Spanish colonial period and was locally adapted in various Philippine regions. The "Chotis" is now part of contemporary Philippine folk dance repertoire. Notable local variations of the dance include Chotis Dingreña from the Ilocos region, and Escotis from the Aklan and Capiz provinces in Panay Island.

=== Paraguay ===
The schottische, locally known as chotis, entered Paraguayan territory through Spanish influence and underwent a process of local adaptation. Like other choreographic expressions originating in Europe, it became widely popular in both urban and rural areas, where it acquired characteristics typical of popular tradition. It enjoyed widespread popularity in the late 19th century, although its practice declined in the following centuries and its use is marginal or virtually non-existent outside traditional dance academies.

=== Poland ===
In Poland, the dance was also known as polka tremblante or just tramblanka.

=== Portugal ===
In Portugal, a form of schottische called xoutiça or xote has become heavily standardized for folklore displays. The pairs in groups of four, six or eight, form a circle and dance embraced all together. The circle starts to rotate until a moment when the pairs pass; that is, the pairs that are opposite each other switch places crossing each other in the center of the circle. They continue to pass successively two by two, all the pairs. After everybody made their pass, they continue to dance by rotating in circle. Further along in the dance, all the pairs will join in the center of the circle to beat the center of the circle with their feet, and continue to dance rotating the circle in the initial position, always for the right side. Bear in mind that all the moves are made always by the pair and never by one of its elements separately, because in the schottische you can never switch pair.

=== Scotland ===
The Highland schottische is a combination of the common schottische and the old reel.

It has two main forms in 2/4 beat, one being more popular than the other. Both versions are similar in starting line-up to the Gay Gordons and has a polka feel to it. Typical tunes for a Highland schottische are "Brochan Lom" and "Laddie With the Plaidie".

In the more popular ceilidh version, the man stands on the left, the woman on the right. They join with left hands joined low in front and with the man's right arm over the woman's right shoulder and hands joined above it. The man points his left foot forward, toe to the floor and slightly to the left, whilst the woman does the same with her right foot. On the first two main beats, each partner raises onto their toes and performs a Highland step, bringing back the heel of extended foot against the calf of the other (inside) leg, whilst hopping on the other foot. They then trot forward 4 steps to the beat, pivot quickly so that the man is on the right and woman on the left, both facing the opposite direction of travel. Their right hands are now joined low forward and left hands above the woman's left shoulder. They perform the same Highland steps as before but now on the opposite foot, before trotting forward 4 steps again. They then face each other with the man on the inside of the circle of travel, the man's hands on the woman's waist and woman's hands on the man's shoulders (alternatively, the partners adopt the waltz position for their arms and hands). They now trot sideways 3 steps to the left (man left/right/left; woman right/left/right), then hop on the same foot as the third step, then trot sideways right (man right/left/right; woman left/right/left) and hop. For the last four bars, the pair spin round as they progress, hopping twice on each foot and finally once on the last bar (man left/left, right/right, left/left, right). They then re-form with hands joined front and back, man on left as before. The dance, when performed at ceilidhs, usually has a jolly, light-footed, spirited feel and is often accompanied by vocal yelps, woos and hooches from the male partners. The hopping spin toward the end of the routine is often done with great gusto. It often causes the pleated backs of the men's kilts to fly up and outward, sometimes with humorous results.

A variation popular in Argyll in the 1920s and '30s focused on showing the man's dancing abilities and as such became known as a form of "peacock dance" (not to be confused with the Asian dances known by that term and featuring performers costumed as peacocks). For the period of the Gay Gordons stance, the partners do not move forward at all, then pivot and move back. Instead, the woman stays in one position, performing the Highland toe-steps with the right foot for four bars, while hopping. The man meanwhile performs two Highland toe-steps with the left foot while hopping. He then moves across behind the woman on his toes for four steps, so that he is now on her right. He then performs two Highland toe-steps with the right foot then moves back behind the woman to her left side again, whilst she performs her toe steps with the left foot while remaining on the same spot. Back on the left, he then faces the woman and they perform the second (polka) half of the routine as per the popular version described above.

A simplified ceilidh variation of the popular version does not required the Gay Gordons method of holding hands in the first half of the routine. Instead, the man holds the woman with his right arm across the small of the woman's back and she does the same to the man with her left arm. The toe-steps are performed as usual and they pivot and turn, whereupon the man puts his left arm across the small of the woman's back and she uses her right arm. The rest of the routine is as per the popular version.

=== Spain ===
In Madrid, the chotis, chotís or schotís is considered the most typical dance of the city since the 19th century and it is danced in all the traditional festivals. Some of the tunes, as "Madrid, Madrid, Madrid" by the Mexican composer Agustín Lara, became very well known in all Spain. The authors of the zarzuelas created a host of new chotis and strengthened their popularity.

=== Sweden ===
In Sweden, the dance is known as a schottis. The name may suggest an origin in the area of Scotland. This is interesting because the Norwegian word used for the same dance is "reinlender", suggesting an origin from the Rhine region.

=== United States ===
A schottische at a contra dance in Massachusetts, U.S.

The schottische arrived in the United States from Europe and there are countless variations of the dance. After 1848, a number of old ballroom variants of schottische were danced in California. The "Five-Step Schottische" and a Highland schottische with modifications were included on lists of ballroom dances of the period. In Texas there have been schottische-like dances with names such as Drunk, Blue Bonnett, McGinty, and Douglas. Schottische variations include a straight leg kick, a kick-hop and a standing hop. Both include the traditional hop that is part of the schottische.

In the southern United States at the start of the 20th century the schottische was combined with ragtime; the most popular "ragtime schottische" of the era was "Any Rags" by Thomas S. Allen in 1902. In New Orleans, Buddy Bolden's band and other proto-jazz groups were known for playing hot schottisches. It is also danced as a Western promenade dance in country–western dance venues, often after the Cotton-Eyed Joe.

== See also ==
- Écossaise
- Strathspey (dance) and Scotch snap
