= Chapelle-des-Bois =

- Commune
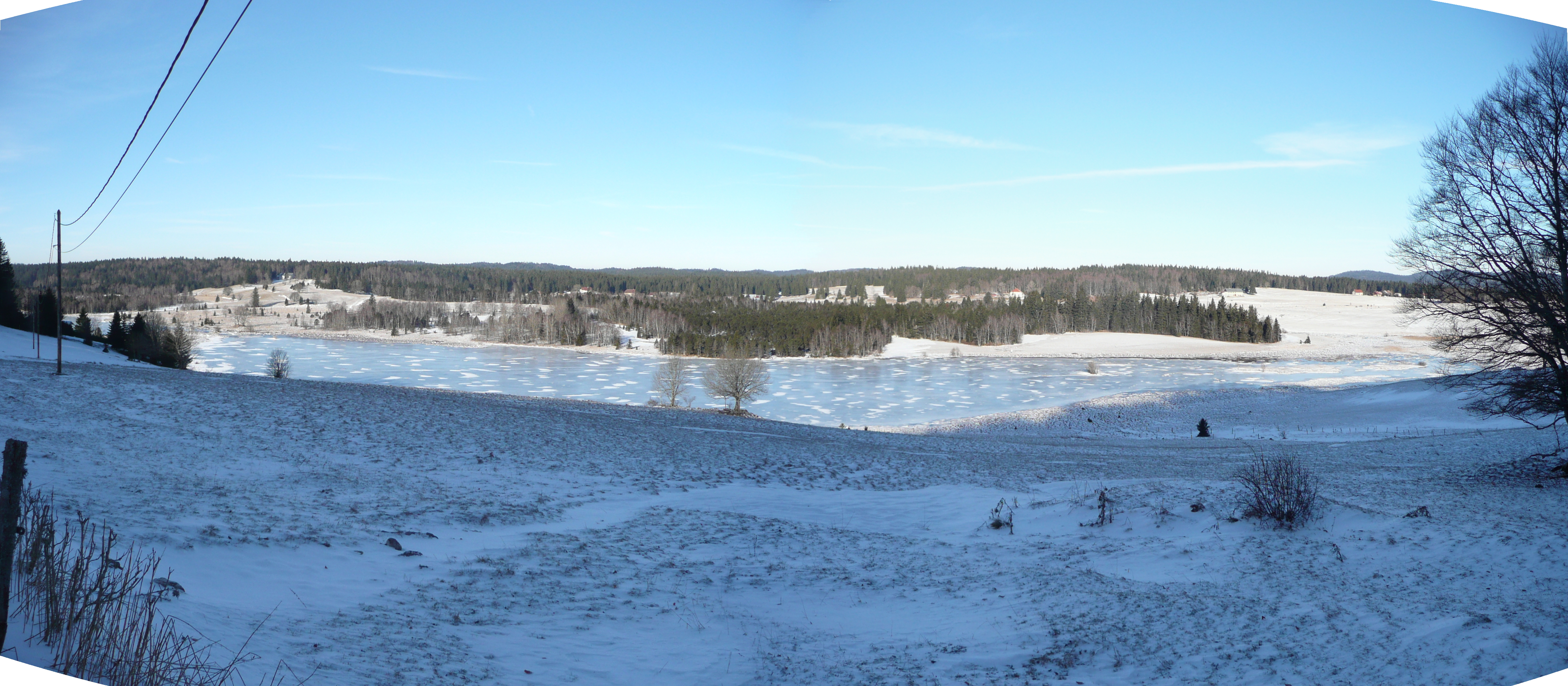
- Lake of the Dead, as seen from Chez L'Aime in Chapelle-des-Bois
- Location of Chapelle-des-Bois
- Location within France Location within Bourgogne-Franche-Comté
- Coordinates: 46°35′57″N 6°06′55″E
- Country: France
- Region: Bourgogne-Franche-Comté
- Department: Doubs
- Arrondissement: Pontarlier
- Canton: Frasne

Government
  - Mayor (2020–2026): Elisabeth Greusard
- Area^{1}: 39.69 km^{2} (15.32 sq mi)
- Highest elevation: 1,374 m (4,508 ft)
- Lowest elevation: 1,006 m (3,301 ft)
- Population (2023): 268
  - Density: 6.75/km^{2} (17.5/sq mi)
- Time zone: UTC+01:00 (CET)
  - Summer (DST): UTC+02:00 (CEST)
- INSEE/Postal code: 25121 /25240
- ^{1} French Land Register data, which excludes lakes, ponds, glaciers > 1 km^{2} (0.386 sq mi or 247 acres) and river estuaries.

Chapelle-des-Bois (French pronunciation: [ʃapɛl de bwa]; Arpitan: Tsapéla-dës-Bо́s) is a commune in the Doubs department in the Bourgogne-Franche-Comté region in eastern France.

== Population ==
Historical population
Year	Pop.	±% p.a.
1968	179	—
1975	165	−1.16%
1982	217	+3.99%
1990	202	−0.89%
1999	244	+2.12%
2007	273	+1.41%
2012	260	−0.97%
2017	253	−0.54%
2023	268	+0.96%
Source: INSEE

== See also ==
- Communes of the Doubs department
