= Limousin septennial ostensions =

The Limousin septennial ostensions (French: Ostensions limousines) is a series of religious processions in commemoration of the relics of Roman Catholic saints in Limousin, France, taking place every seven years, in years divisible by 7, the last being 2023.

The ostensions were inscribed by UNESCO in 2013 (8.COM) on the Representative List of the Intangible Cultural Heritage of Humanity.

== Gallery ==
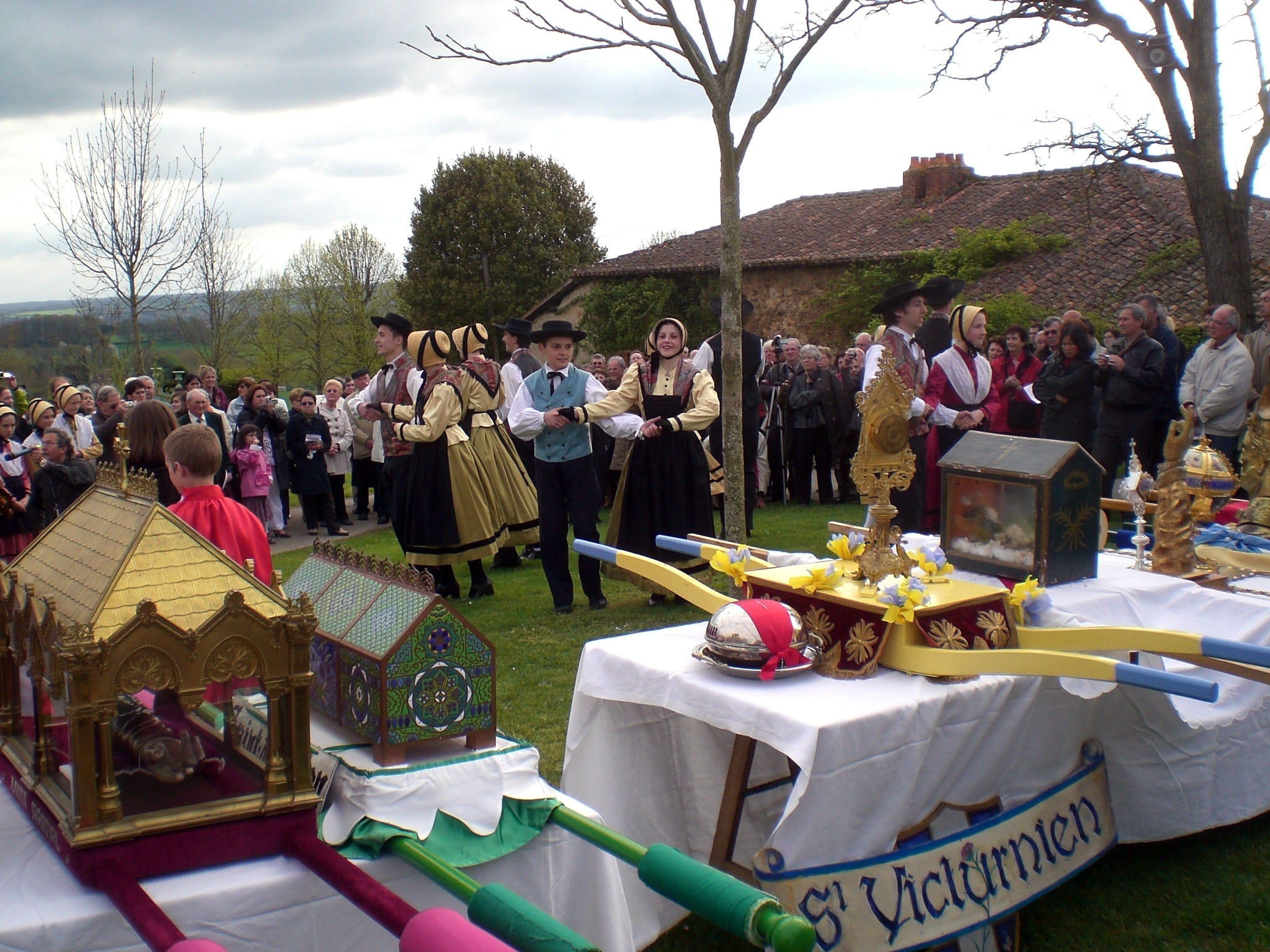
2009 by FCL
