= Patrice Coirault =

French ethnomusicologist

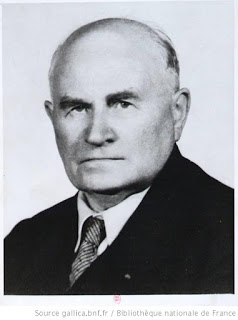
- Born: 26 September 1875; Surin, Deux-Sèvres, France
- Died: 15 January 1959 (aged 83); Surin, Deux-Sèvres, France
- Education: Lycée de Niort; Lycée Michelet; University of Paris
- Occupation: Ethnomusicologist

Patrice Coirault (26 September 1875 - 15 January 1959) was a French ethnomusicologist.

== Early life ==
Patrice Coirault was born on 26 September 1875. His father was a schoolteacher and his mother was the daughter of farmers from Poitou.

Coirault was educated at the Lycée de Niort and the Lycée Michelet near Paris. He graduated from the University of Paris, where he earned a two-year degree.

== Career ==
Coirault worked as a high-ranking civil servant in the Ministry of Public Works.

Coirault began researching traditional songs in the countrysides of Poitou and Béarn in 1898, under the mentorship of Charles Seignobos. By 1927, he authored his first book Recherches sur notre ancienne chanson populaire traditionnelle. He went on to publish several more books about French regional ethnomusicologist.

== Death ==
Coirault died on 15 January 1959 in his hometown of Surin; he was 85.

== Works ==
- Coirault, Patrice (1927–1933). Recherches sur notre ancienne chanson populaire traditionnelle. Paris: Librairie Droz. OCLC 558015119.
- Coirault, Patrice (1942). Notre chanson folklorique. Paris: Auguste Picard. OCLC 459337819.
- Coirault, Patrice (1953–1963). Formation de nos chansons folkloriques. Paris: Éditions du Scarabée. OCLC 1037565.
