= Jean-Michel Guilcher =

French ethnologist

- Born: 24 September 1914; Saint-Pierre-Quilbignon, Finistère, France
- Died: 27 March 2017 (aged 102); Meudon, Hauts-de-Seine, France
- Education: Lycée de Brest; University of Paris
- Occupation: Ethnologist
- Spouse: Hélène Guilcher
- Children: 3

Jean-Michel Guilcher (24 September 1914 – 27 March 2017) was a French ethnologist. He was a researcher at the CNRS, and he taught ethnology at the University of Western Brittany. He was the author of eight books about traditional dances.

== Early life ==
Jean-Michel Guilcher was born on 24 September 1914 in Saint-Pierre-Quilbignon, Finistère. One of his grandmothers, who was from Aber-Ildut, sang the gwerz.

Guilcher was educated at the Lycée de Brest. He graduated from the University of Paris, where he studied natural history. He also took dance lessons from Alick-Maud Pledge. Later, he was mentored by the ethnologist Patrice Coirault, and he attended classes taught by Jacques Chailley with Constantin Brăiloiu. He subsequently earned a PhD in Dance Studies.

== Career ==
Guilcher worked for Jeune France, a traditional dance organization in Lyon, from 1939 to 1942. During that time, he researched the traditional dances of villages near Lyon. He subsequently worked for Paul Faucher, where he edited Père Castor, a collection of children's books. After the war, he began researching the traditional dances of villages in Brittany.

Guilcher began working for the Centre national de la recherche scientifique (CNRS) in 1955. He later worked for the Musée national des Arts et Traditions Populaires, where he founded a section about dance. He was a professor of ethnology at the University of Western Brittany from 1969 to 1979. He subsequently served as the director of a research centre at the University of Western Brittany and the School for Advanced Studies in the Social Sciences.

Guilcher was the author of eight books about the traditional dances of Brittany.

== Personal life and death ==
With his wife Hélène, Guilcher had three children. They resided in Meudon near Paris, where he died on 27 March 2017.

== Works ==
- Guilcher, Jean-Michel (1963). La Tradition populaire de danse en Basse-Bretagne. Paris: La Haye. OCLC 558839438.
- Guilcher, Jean-Michel (1965). Les Formes anciennes de la danse en Berry. Paris: Maisonneuve et Larose. OCLC 844311445.
- Guilcher, Jean-Michel (1969). La Contredanse et les renouvellements de la danse française. Paris: La Haye. OCLC 718073031.
- Guilcher, Jean-Michel (1984). La Tradition de danse en Béarn et Pays basque français. Paris: Éditions de la Maison des Sciences de l'Homme. ISBN 9782901725633. OCLC 433206768.
- Guilcher, Jean-Michel (1989). La chanson folklorique de langue française : la notion et son histoire. Créteil: Atelier de la danse populaire. ISBN 9782907567015. OCLC 24554549.
- Guilcher, Jean-Michel (2003). Rondes, branles, caroles : le chant dans la danse. Brest: Centre de Recherche Bretonne et Celtique. ISBN 9782901737544. OCLC 231983772.
- Guilcher, Jean-Michel (2009). Danse traditionnelle et anciens milieux ruraux français : tradition, histoire, société. Paris: L'Harmattan. ISBN 9782296082588. OCLC 470618327.
- Guilcher, Jean-Michel (2009). Danses traditionnelles en Pyrénées centrales. Paris: Cairn. ISBN 9782350681085. OCLC 690402066.
