= Gay Gordons (dance) =

Scottish country dance

The Gay Gordons is a Scottish country dance. The usual tune was written by James Scott Skinner. It was also known as The Gordon Highlanders' March, first printed in the collection "Monikie Series no 3" in c 1890. Jimmy Shand made a recording of it in 1942.

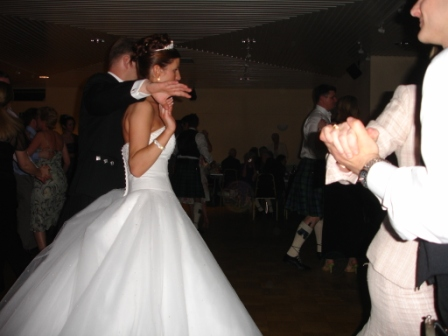
Gay Gordons dance at a wedding

== Dance instructions ==
A standard ceilidh instruction:

Formation: couples in a circle around the room facing anti-clockwise, ladies on the right.
Music: 2/4 or 4/4 march. E.g. "Scotland the Brave", "The Gay Gordons".

Bars	Description
1-2	Right hands joined over lady's shoulder (man's arm behind her back) and left hands joined in front, walk forward for four steps, starting on the right foot.
3-4	Still moving in the same direction, and without letting go, pivot on the spot (so left hand is behind lady and right hand is in front) and take four steps backwards.
5-8	Repeat in the opposite direction.
9-12	Drop left hands, raise right hands above lady's head. Lady pivots on the spot. (The man may set).
13-16	Joining hands in ballroom hold, polka (dance step) round the room.

Repeat ad lib. In order to make the dance progressive, the ladies may leave their partners between bars 12-13 and move to the partner before them in the circle.

For Scottish country dancers, the grip in the first eight bars is allemande hold.

A live demonstration was performed by the Royal Scottish Country Dancing Society in 2007.

== See also ==
- Scottish country dance
- Royal Scottish Country Dance Society
- List of Scottish country dances
- Chapelloise
