= Jacques Vandevelde =

Belgian footballer

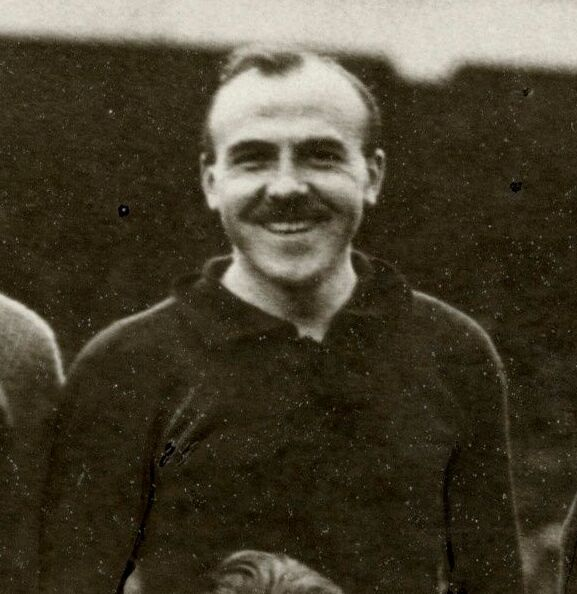
- Jacques Vandevelde in 1922

Personal information
- Date of birth: 21 March 1895
- Date of death: 10 October 1983 (aged 88)

International career
| Years | Team | Apps | (Gls) |
| 1921–1923 | Belgium | 5 | (1) |

Jacques Vandevelde (21 March 1895 – 10 October 1983) was a Belgian footballer. He played in five matches for the Belgium national football team from 1921 to 1923.
