= Breton dance =

Traditional dance from Brittany, France

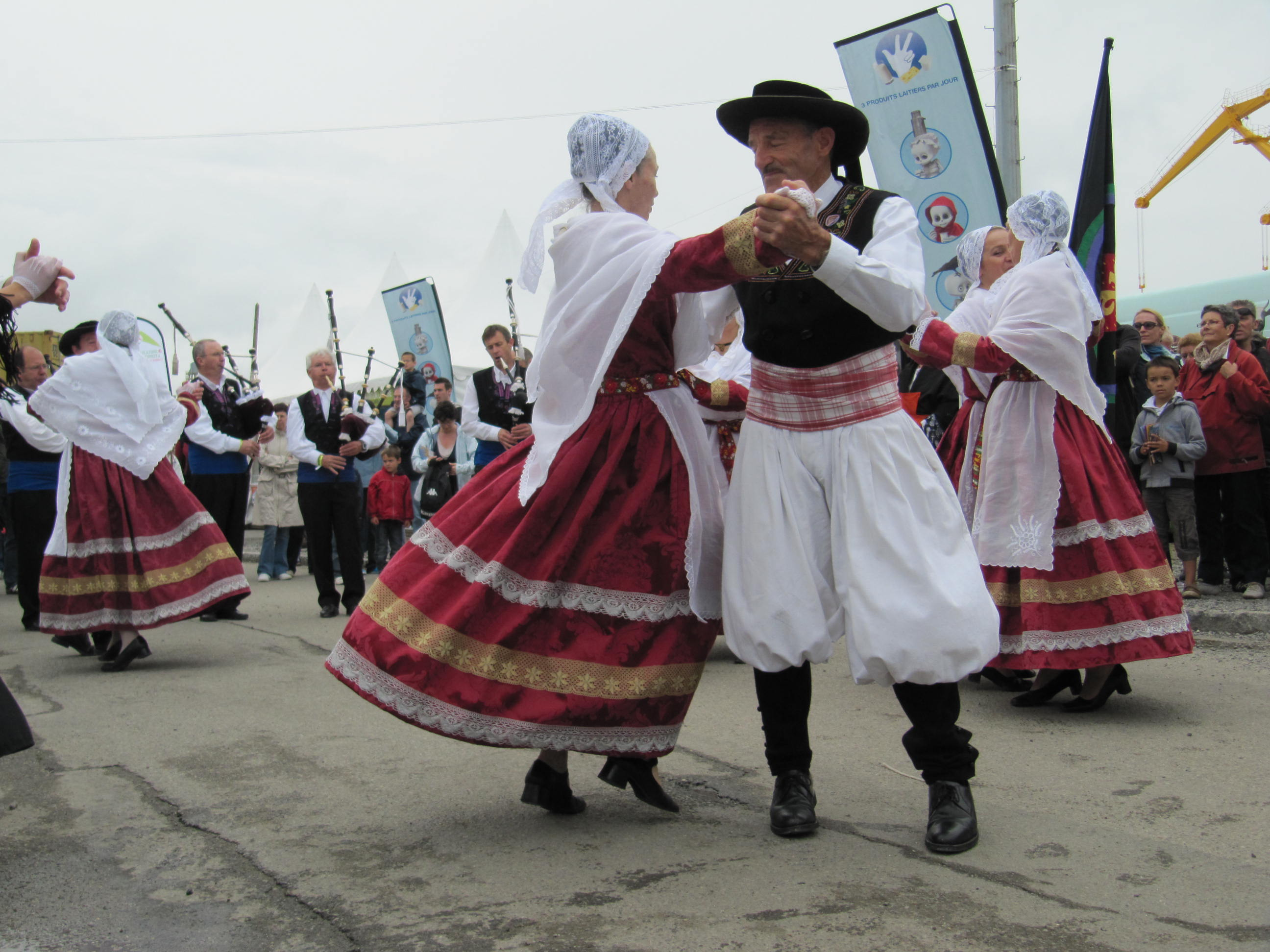
Breton dancers

Breton dance is a group of traditional dance forms originating in Brittany, the Celtic region of France. The dance has experienced a reappropriation in the late 1950s, with the development of the Celtic Circles (cultural groups) and Fest Noz (night festival).

== Overview ==
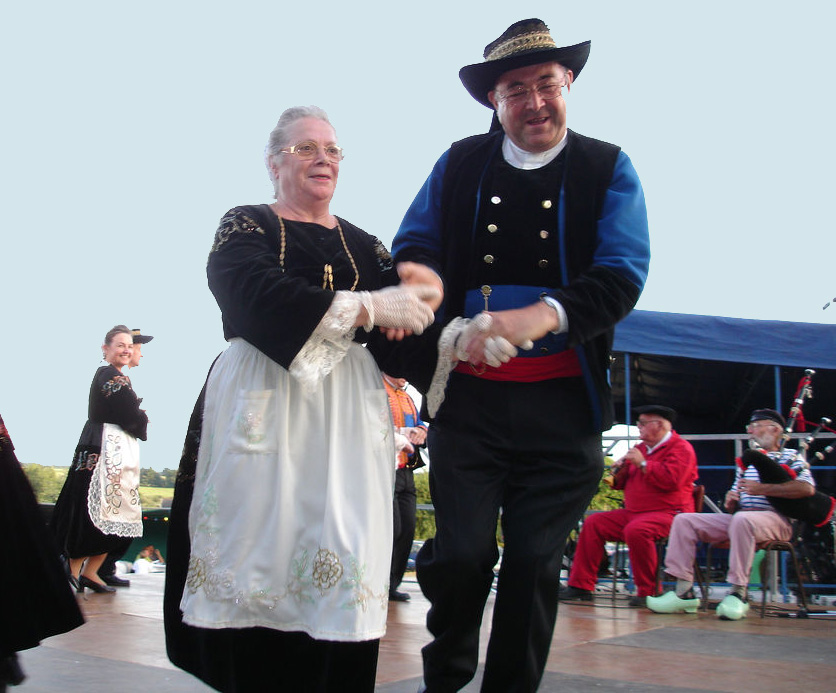
Two Breton dancers in traditional costume

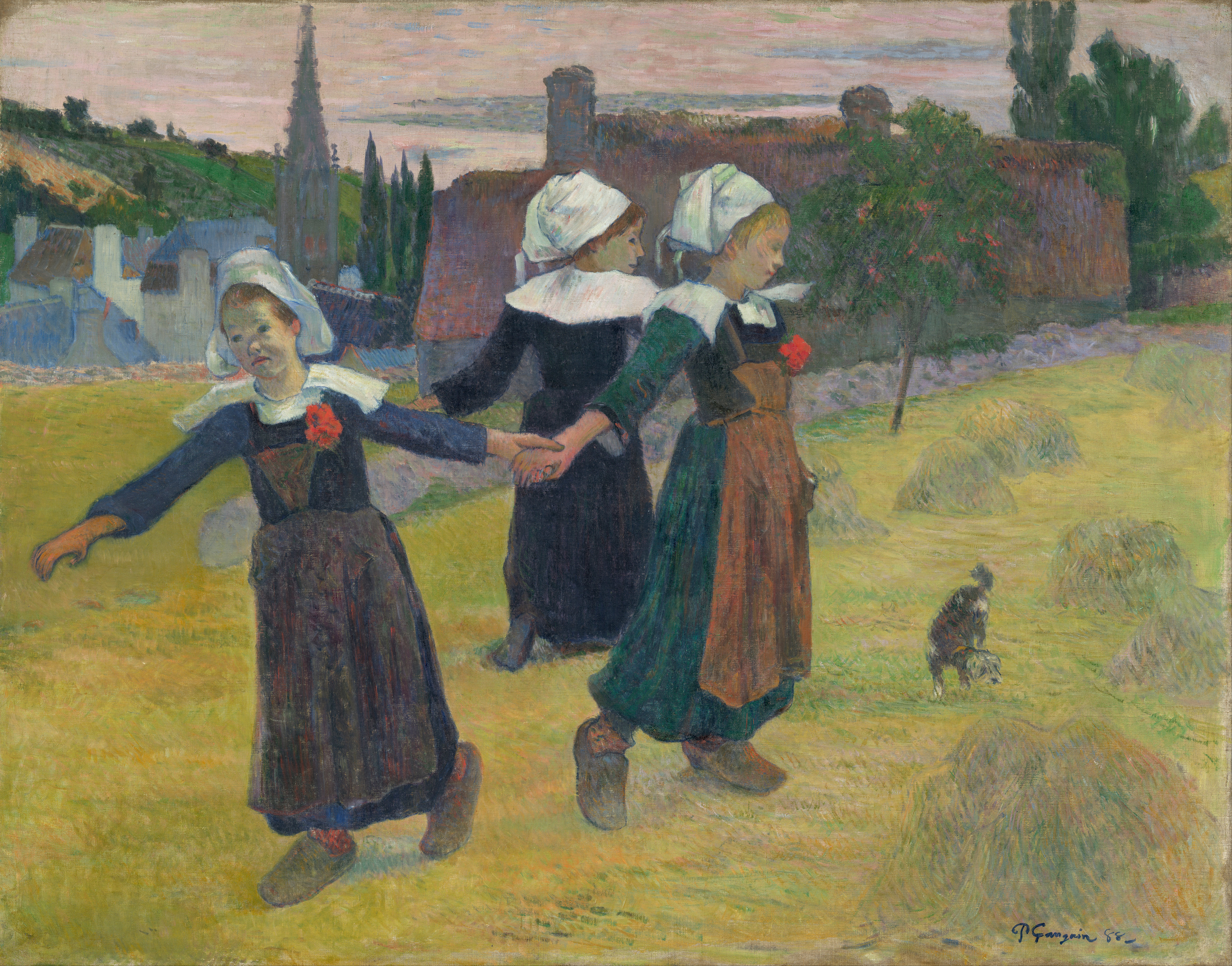
"Breton Girls Dancing"; Paul Gauguin

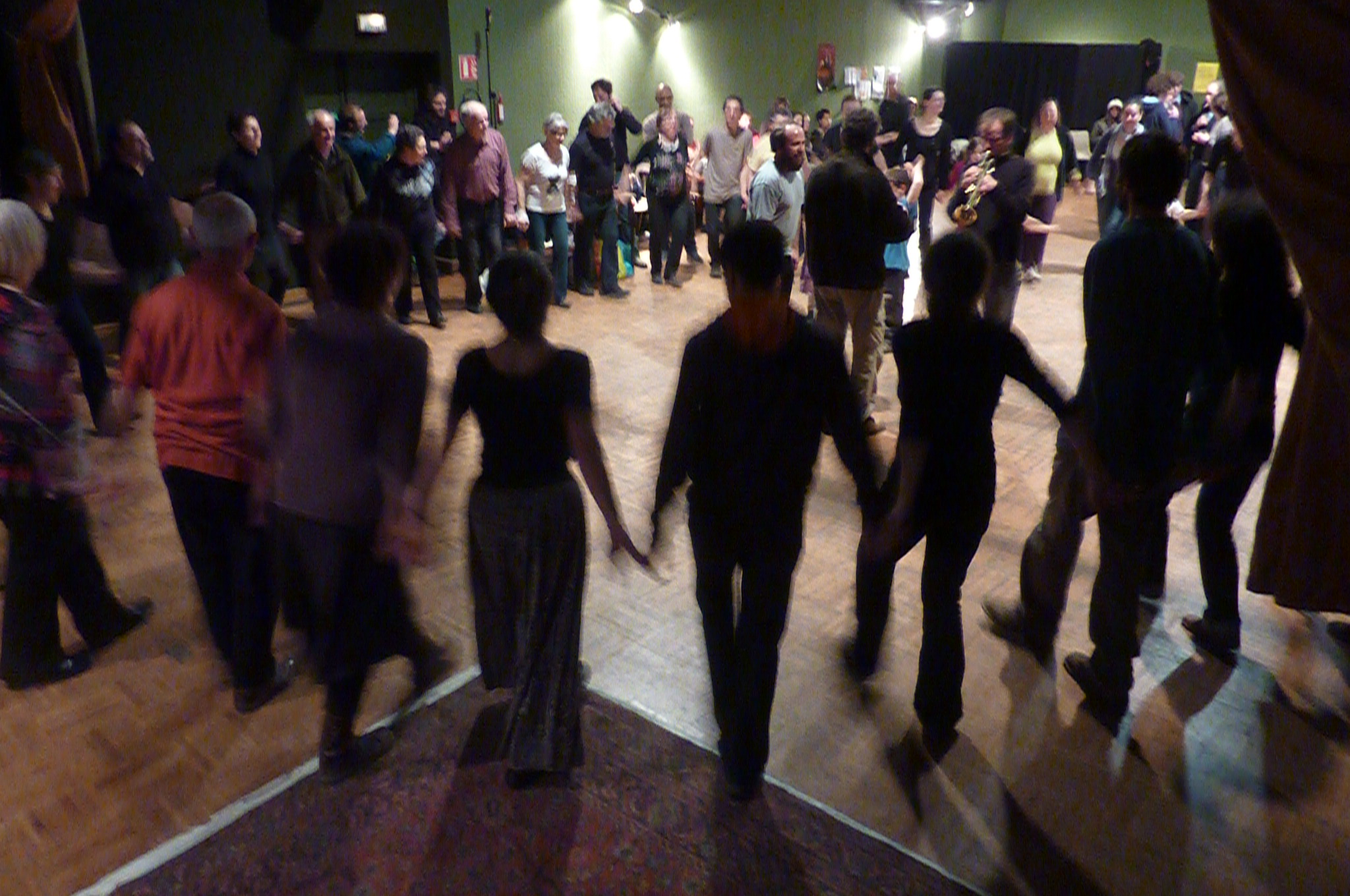
Fest-noz at Langon, Ille-et-Vilaine

In the agricultural society of the 19th century, the most common occasion on which dancing took place was a wedding. Other opportunities for dancing were:

- beating the earth floor of a new house or repairing a damaged beaten earth floor
- preparing a threshing floor
- celebrations following agricultural work (such as a harvest festival)
- secular celebrations accompanying a religious festival (such as a pardon)

More recently, throughout the second half of the 20th century, a revival of traditional Breton dancing has taken place, to such an extent that it can now be considered to be at the forefront of contemporary Breton cultural expression, along with the music which accompanies it.

Two main opportunities exist to experience Breton dance: fest-noz (night festival) and fest-deiz (day festival). The former reunites both young and old in a celebration of their cultural heritage, whereas the latter tends to be frequented by a somewhat older collection of people. Moreover, the range of dances found at a fest-noz is likely to be smaller; at a fest-deiz the full variety of Breton dance can often be seen, including dances in fours and eights which rarely get an outing at a fest-noz.

Breton dance is accompanied by musicians and singers playing and singing in duos, trios, quartets and, sometimes, even larger groups. Traditional acoustic instruments are often the mainstay of these occasions, though some groups have also taken up electric instruments as well. The most ubiquitous instruments are the accordion and two characteristically Breton wind instruments: the biniou (a kind of bagpipe) and the bombarde (a reed instrument similar to the oboe).
The circular form, the typical pattern of the most dominant dance in the western Brittany repertoire, is very representative of the social structure. The circle is the representation of a community which can express itself only if each dancer is at the right place. The individual is both a minor and a vital element in the working order of the dancing and singing.

In Brittany, music and dancing have always been an expression of identity for the folk society. They were a particular moment favouring the expression of individuals who fused together through a happy time. They followed the different stages of life and structured its organisation. Yet the practice of dancing and music was not restricted to a pure entertainment. It was the manifestation of the folk social order which expressed through a collective activity the status of each individual within the community.

Dancing and singing convey the expression of an identity. This is the fundamental character which has permitted to Breton culture to develop through ages by adapting to the continuous cultural evolution. It also explains the current extraordinary enthusiasm of thousands of Bretons who today keep practicing music and dancing, thus perpetuating a centuries-old tradition.

== Dances ==
=== Lower Brittany ===
Jean-Michel Guilcher distinguishes between five fundamental dances in the region of Lower Brittany. These are described as the "mother-forms" from whose ancient roots numerous variants have been developed, to such an extent sometimes that the original can hardly be recognised. These five forms are:

- the Gavotte
- the En Dro
- the Dañs Treger
- the Dañs Leon
- the Dañs tro Plinn

The Gavotte (also known as dañs tro) is a dance in four time. It is the dance with the most variants and can be considered to include kost ar c'hoad and suite fisel. It is associated with a large geographical region, which includes Cornouaille and the north-west of the Pays de Léon. The gavotte is the most widespread of all Breton dances. Originally, the dancers formed a closed circle, and this is still largely true today. Alternatively, particularly at festoù-noz, it is also danced in long, circling lines throughout the hall.

The En Dro (or An Dro) was originally a dance of the area around the city of Vannes, in the south of Lower Brittany. It is a dance in four time. To it can be added its sister dance - the Hanter Dro. These two dances are sometimes combined to form a third, known as Dañs tricot.

The Dañs Treger is a dance from the Trégor region and fell into disuse at the end of the 19th century. Research into the dance has nevertheless enabled a reconstruction of its main features, which are similar to those of dances found in the Pays Gallo (Penthièvre, Mené, Loudéac).

The Dañs Leon is a dance from the North of Finistère which features two lines of men and women, face to face, progressing in parallel.

The Dañs tro plinn is a dance whose origin is uncertain. Like the gavotte, it is a dance where the participants are linked in circles or lines, each dancer connected to his or her neighbour by the characteristic hold of bras dessus, bras dessous (arm over, arm under).

=== Upper Brittany ===
The study of the dances of Upper Brittany was not made until more recent times and there is thus no fundamental study of these dances comparable to that of Guilcher's research into Lower Brittany. There is consequently little certitude about the practice of these dances before the start of the 20th century.

==== Dances in the fashion of the En Dro ====
These can be found to the south-west of Lower Brittany in the elongation of the Pays Vannetais. They include:

- rond
- tour
- pilé-menu

The structure of these dances suggests a similarity with the en dro of Lower Brittany, with variations in movements or arm holds.

==== The ronds or rondes ====
Different pays in the region have given birth to different dances:

- the ronds du Penthièvre, de l'Oust, du Lié, du Mené
- the ronds du type Guérandais
- the rond de Saint-Vincent
- the ronds "isolés"

The Ronds du Penthièvre, de l'Oust, du Lié, du Mené: one of the most well-known dances from this group is the rond de Loudéac. Strictly speaking, the rond de Loudéac is a suite, usually of four dances: rond-bal-rond-riquegnée. The fourth of these is a kind of passepied.

The Ronds du type Guérandais are to be found in the districts situated between the estuary of the river Vilaine and the Loire. They often feature two distinct parts, one more sedate and the other more vigorous, within the same dance.

The Rond de Saint-Vincent is a popular dance comprising only one part.

The Ronds isolés: a category which includes dances such as the "rond de Sautron", "rond d'Erquy", "ronds de Châteaubriant"...

==== The passepieds ====
These dances were common throughout a large geographical area, in particular the west of the Trégor. A form of the passepied (pach pi) is found in Upper Brittany.

== See also ==
Folk dancers in Brest

- Bleuniadur, Leon Folk Arts and Dance Ensemble
