= Kadril =

Belgian folk group

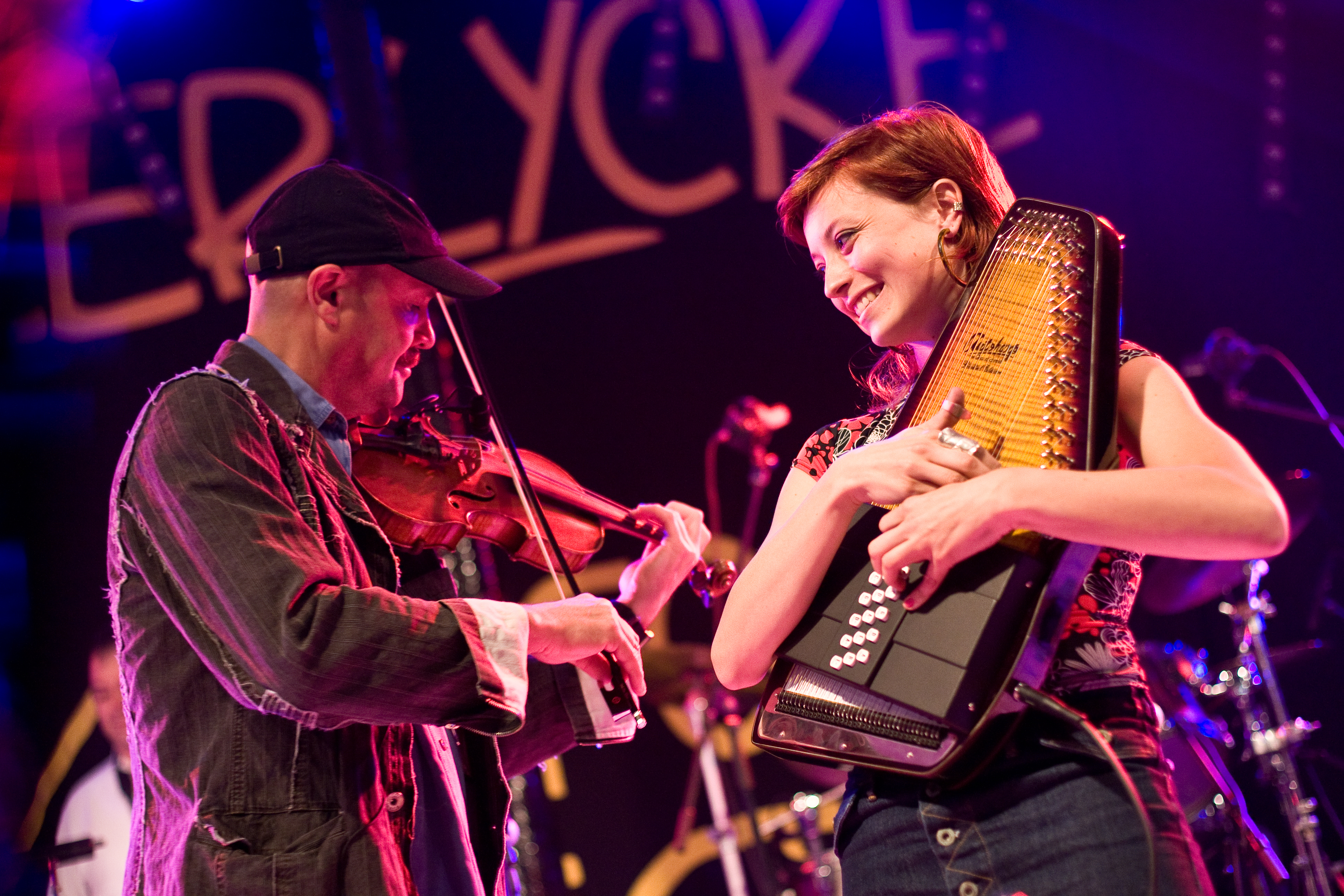
- Kadril performing in 2007

Background information
- Origin: Belgium
- Genres: Folk
- Years active: 1976–present
- Labels: Wild Boar Music
- Members: Peter Libbrecht; Harlind Libbrecht; Bart De Cock; Erwin Libbrecht; Koen Dewaele; Karla Verlie; Jonathan Callens
- Past members: Hans Quaghebeur; Jo Van Houtte; Patrick Riguelle; Dirk Verhegge; Willy Seeuws; Philippe Mobers; Eva De Roovere; Ron Reuman; Mariken Boussemaere; Lieven Huys
- Website: www.kadril.be

Kadril is a Belgian folk group formed in 1976 from the then youth and nature movement Wielewaaljongeren. The group name refers to the salon dance Quadrille, transliterated into Flemish as Kwadril or Kadril.

== History ==
Kadril started with Erwin, Peter and Harlind Libbrecht, along with Bart de Cock. Hans Quaghebeur soon joined the group. The five original members are still the core of the group. Kadril initially began playing Irish and French music before being persuaded to play Flemish music by Herman Dewitt of the Flemish folk band nl: 't Kliekske. Prior to the release of their self-titled LP in 1986, they performed at fairs and neighbourhood parties.

Kadril was invited to participate in the Radio 1 production (with Dree Peremans). This was their initial collaboration with Patrick Riguelle. In 1990, their folk and folk-rock album De Vogel in de muite was released. In 1994, a collaboration with Patrick Riguelle was released on the CD Nooit met Krijt. Two years later, the live album De Groote boodschap was released, ending the collaboration with Patrick, who was replaced by Eva de Roovere.

The first CD was released with Eva, which was aptly called Eva. In 2001, they released the two-disc compilation album All the Best. To celebrate their 25th anniversary in 2003, the group released a second new album with Eva entitled Pays. It was produced by Gabriel Yacoub, the leader of the French folk group Malicorne. In 2004, Kadril collaborated with the Galician singers and musicians of Ialma and Alumea to create the album La Paloma Negra. In October of that year, Eva De Roovere left the group, being replaced by Mariken Boussemaere. In 2005, Kadril released The Other Shore / De Andere Kust with songs relating to emigration to America.

Foreign guests Szilvia Bognár and Heather Grabham joined the band's new singer Mariken Boussemaere. In 2006, to honour their 30th anniversary, Kadril was the main guest at the Nekka-Night in the Antwerp Sportpaleis. On 7 September 2007, they were joined by Sois Belle in Moorslede at a benefit concert for Sabou Fanyi Guinea. In the spring of 2009, Kadril released the new CD Mariage. Later that year, Mariken Boussemaere left the group, playing her last performance at the Gooikoorts folk festival.

Karla Verlie became the new lead singer of Kadril. In 2011 Kadril released the double CD compilation album Grand Cru. In addition to a selection from their previous CDs, this also included unpublished new recordings. In 2014 their most recent album Archaï was released. On 9 January 2017, guitarist Lieven Huys suddenly died of heart failure at the age of fifty. While performing at Na Fir Bolg 2017, Patrick Riguelle left the band.

== Band members ==
Current members

- Peter Libbrecht – violin, vocals, percussion, harmonica (1976-)
- Harlind Libbrecht – mandolin, dulcimer, slide guitar, vocals (1976-)
- Bart De Cock – bagpipes, nyckelharpa, accordion (1976-)
- Erwin Libbrecht – acoustic guitar, Irish bouzouki, banjo, vocals (1976-)
- Koen Dewaele – bass (1999-)
- Karla Verlie – vocals, accordion (2009-)
- Jonathan Callens – drums (2011-)

Former members

- Hans Quaghebeur – hurdy-gurdy, accordion, fife, dulcimer, banjo (1986–2010)
- Jo Van Houtte – double bass (1986–?)
- Patrick Riguelle – vocals (1990–1997)
- Dirk Verhegge – electric guitar, banjo (1990–2012)
- Willy Seeuws – drums (1990–1994)
- Philippe Mobers – drums (1994–2003 2004–2011)
- Eva De Roovere – vocals (1998–2004)
- Ron Reuman – drums (2003–2004)
- Mariken Boussemaere – vocals, flute (2004–2009)
- Lieven Huys – electric guitar (2013–2017; Died 2017)

== Discography ==
- Kadril (1986)
- De Vogel in de Muite (1990)
- Nooit met Krijt (1994)
- De Groote Boodschap – Live (1996)
- Eva (1999)
- All the Best (2001)
- Pays (2003)
- La Paloma Negra (2004)
- De Andere Kust (2005)
- Mariage (2009)
- Grand Cru (2011)
- Archaï (2014)
- Jolie Flamande (2023)
