= Celtic circle =

Association which aims at emphasizing the Breton culture

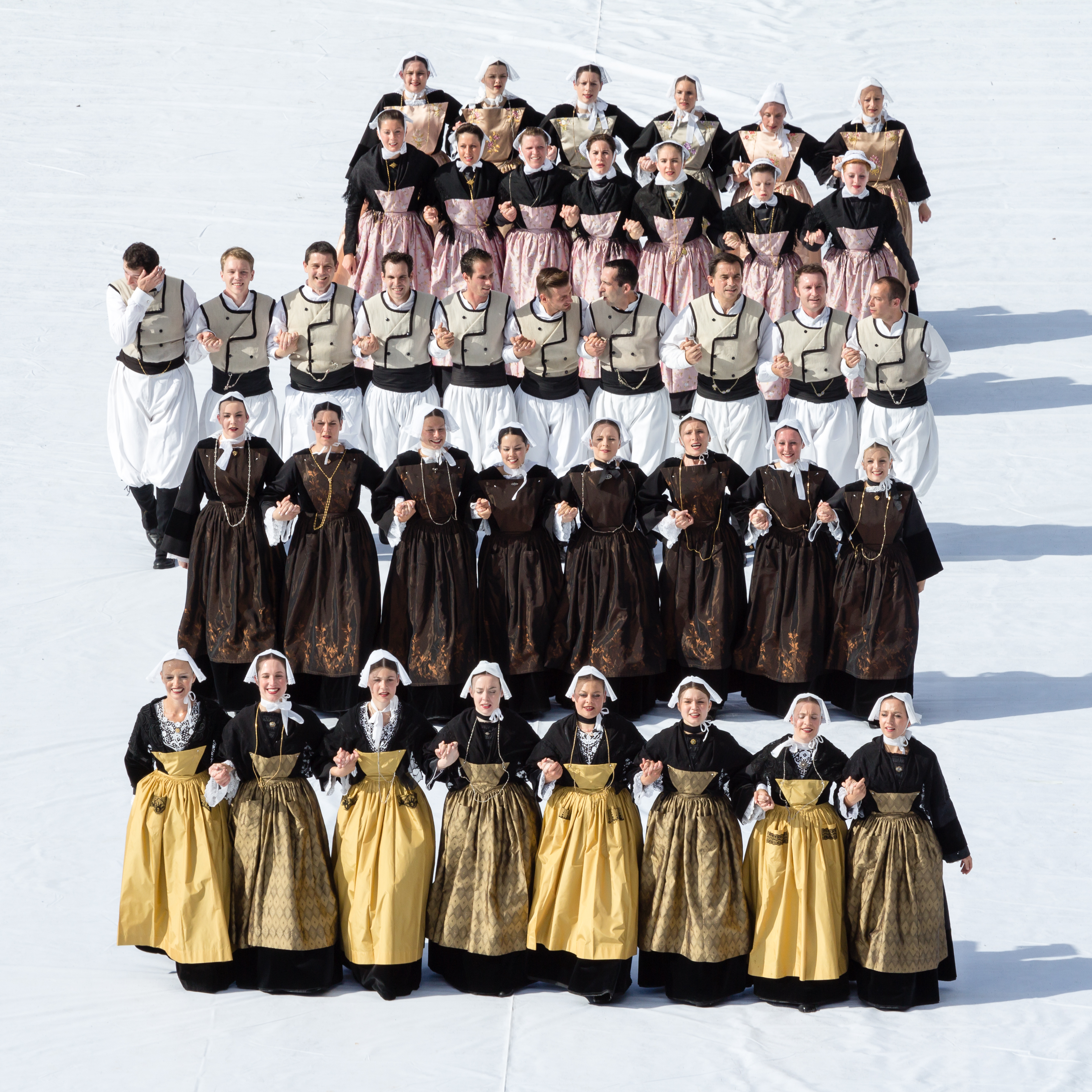
Kevrenn Alre

A Celtic circle (Breton: kelc'h keltiek, French: cercle celtique) is an association which emphasizes the Breton culture, by using possibly the Breton language.

The Celtic circles created before the Second World War had very wide cultural objectives, including the literature, the theater, the songs, the choral singing, the plastic arts and the learning and the practice of the Breton language, but not always the music and the dance of Brittany. However, those after 1945 generally restricted their scope and concern themselves with collecting, studying, transmitting and disseminating arts and the popular traditions in Brittany, in particular the Breton dances by occurring on stage with amateur status: performances and compositions created will go in this direction.

There are between 200 and 300, most of which are located in Brittany, but there are also many in cities where Breton communities are found in France, Guadeloupe, New York City, and Beijing. There are two large federations, who organize competitions, Kendalc'h and War'l Leur. The circles and festival of the city of Quimper are very well known.

== Activities ==
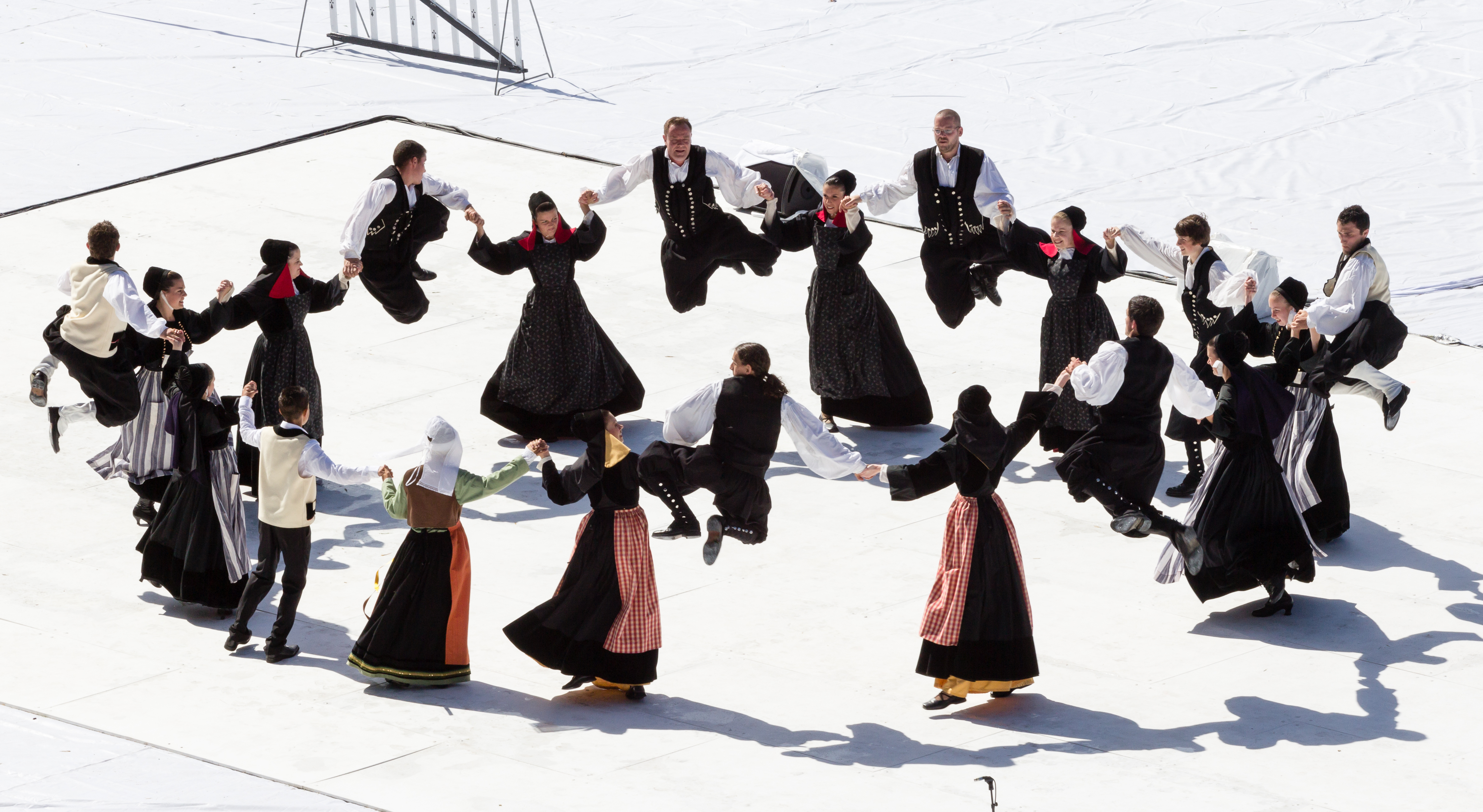
Kerlenn Pondi

- dance
- music
- costumes
- teaching (transmission)
- collecting

== See also ==
- Circle dance
- Kerlenn Pondi
