= Money Musk =

Traditional contra dance and tune

"Money Musk" being contra danced at Youth Dance Weekend 2019 in Weston, Vermont, with music by Calluna. The clip begins after the calling has stopped.

"Money Musk" (/ˈmʌnɪ mʌsk/), alternatively spelled "Monymusk" or other variations, is a country dance first published in 1785. It has versions as an English country dance, a contra dance, and a Scottish country dance. It was named after a 1776 strathspey by Daniel Dow which is played to accompany it, which itself was named after the House of Monymusk baronial estate. The contra dance features a central theme of reoriented lines, and is regarded as moderately difficult. It is still widely danced today, and is considered a traditional "chestnut".

== Contra dance ==
Part	Move	Beats
A	Actives allemande right once and a half	8
A	Actives go down the outside one place and join hands in lines of three	4
A	Lines go forward and back six	4
B	Actives allemande right three quarters and fall back into lines of three	8
B	Lines go forward and back six	4
B	Actives allemande right three quarters	4
C	Top two couples do right and left four	16
Formation: Triple minor, proper

The dance is done in triple minor, proper formation (the figures are done within subsets of three couples, with all lark-role dancers beginning on the right and all robin-role dancers beginning on the left). In its most common modern form, it consists of three parts, which are repeated a number of times.

In the A part, the active couple (the couple closest to the band) does a right-hand allemande once and a half around. They then go down the outside of the set one place and rejoin, taking hands in lines of three. The lines go forward and back.

In the B part, the active couple does another right-hand allemande three quarters around (or, in some versions, a left-hand turn once and a quarter around) and then falls back, so that the lark is facing down the hall between the second couple and the robin is facing up the hall between the third couple. The lines take hands and go forward and back. The active couple then does a final right-hand allemande three quarters around, returning the set to a proper formation, but progressed one place down.

In the C part, the top two couples pass through the set (walking to each other's places, passing by the right shoulder) and then turn as a pair (the dancer on the right walks forward and the one on the left walks backward, such that they take each other's place and end facing inward), both without touching.

At the end of the C part, the active couple has exchanged places with the second couple. The dance resumes with the active couple dancing the figures with the next two couples in the set.

== Scottish country dance ==
There is a Scottish country dance variation of "Money Musk" with its own figures. It was recorded by the Royal Scottish Country Dance Society in Book 11 (1936).

Bars	Sequence
1-4	1s turn by the right and cast
5-8	1s turn by the left 1¼ times, finishing 2M1L2L facing 3M1M3L in lines across
9-10	all set
11-12	all set again, 1s pulling right shoulder back on the left foot step to finish 2s1s3s, 1s on opposite sides
13-16	all set twice on the sides
17-24	2s1s3s 6 hands round and back
25-30	reels of 3 on the sides, 1s giving right shoulder to second corners to start
31-32	1s cross to own sides in 2nd place

== History ==
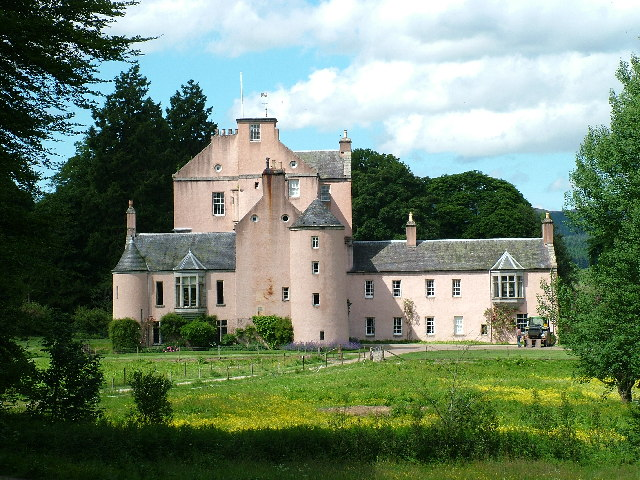
The House of Monymusk in Aberdeenshire, Scotland

The dance was first published in 1785. The name derives from the House of Monymusk, a baronial estate in Aberdeenshire, Scotland. The estate's name came from the Gaelic moine mus(g)ach, meaning "nasty, filthy bog".

After initial publication, it spread rapidly, including to North America by 1792. In the 19th century, the contra dance was done using a 32-bar sequence. Variations solidified into a common form by the middle of that century. Beginning at some point (possibly the 1870s, according to Ralph Page), it was gradually changed to a 24-bar sequence, requiring the figures to be danced more rapidly and the phrasing to change. Particularly, the forward and back was compressed from eight beats to four, which has led to disagreement about whether it should be a balance.

The contra dance appeared in Henry Ford's Good Morning (1926). It was danced continuously throughout the 20th century, including in the second folk revival in the 1960s, and became regarded as a traditional "chestnut" dance.

In 2009, a "Bring Back Money Musk" campaign to revive the contra dance was begun by David Smukler and David Millstone. On March 14 of that year, it was danced quasi-simultaneously by more than 1300 dancers in 22 locations across four countries. It has seen more active use since.

== Music ==
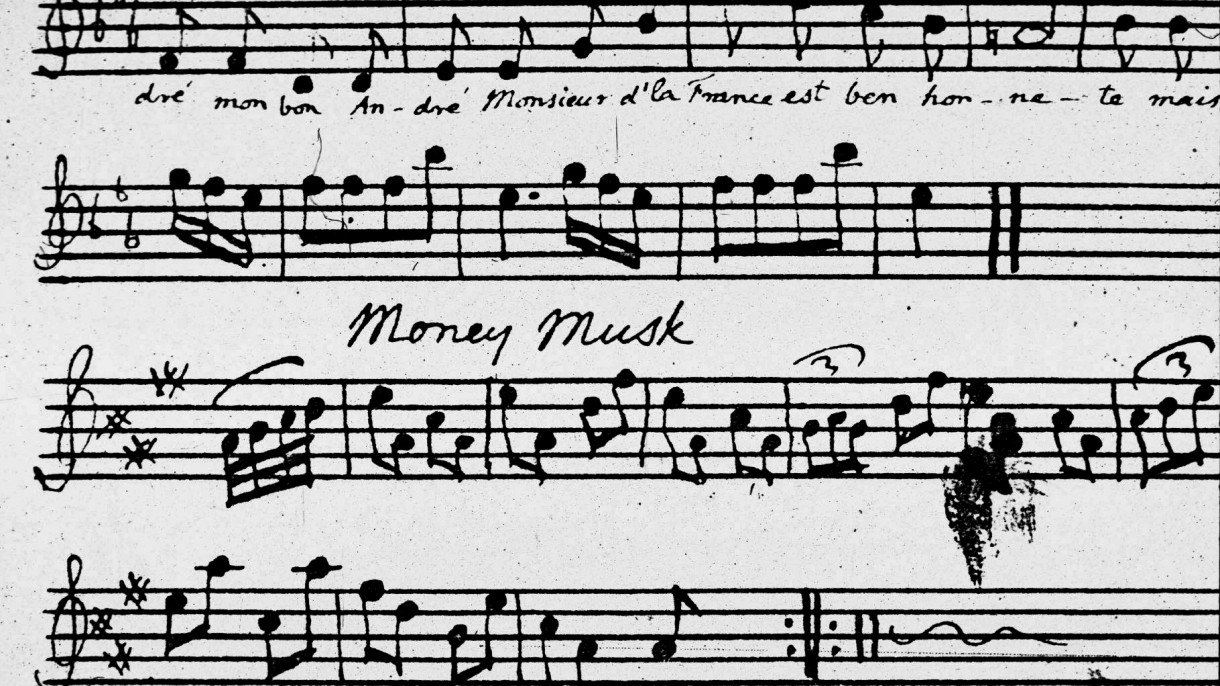
The sheet music for Money Musk in Thomas Jefferson's handwriting

The music for "Money Musk" is a 1776 tune of the same name by Scottish composer Daniel Dow, published in 1780 as "Sir Archibald Grant of Moniemusk's Reel". It was originally a strathspey, a type of dance tune in 4/4 time slightly slower than a reel. The tune appeared frequently in nineteenth-century tunebooks. Over time, it spread to other parts of the British Isles and North America, adopting elements of local styles.

In the 24-beat reel version of the tune used for the modern contra dance, the A and B parts are not repeated and a new C part is added. It is regarded as difficult to play. Unusually for contra dances, the tune and dance have become closely associated, and it is almost always danced to the traditional tune. It is traditional for dancers to shout the name of the dance when the music starts.

== Reception ==
Both the tune and the dance gained widespread popularity.

Ralph Page described "Money Musk" as the most famous of all New England dances. In Cracking Chestnuts, David Smukler writes that the contra dance is "'crooked' (unusual in its metric or rhythmic structure), hypnotic, and manages successfully to remain both uncluttered and surprising". He notes that its central theme is reorientation, as it involves lines both along the sides of the set and facing up and down the dance hall. The dance is regarded as moderately difficult.

Smukler wrote of the tune that it "bristles with irrepressible excitement". It allegedly appeared on a dance card at Abraham Lincoln's inaugural ball. A version arranged by Nicholas Britell and performed by Tim Fain was used in the soundtrack for the 2013 biographical drama 12 Years a Slave.
