= Tony Parkes (caller) =

American choreographer and writer (1949–2024)

- Born: Anthony Philip Parkes; November 10, 1949; New York City, New York, U.S.
- Died: May 6, 2024 (aged 74) Billerica, Massachusetts
- Genres: American folk music
- Occupations: Folk dance caller and writer, musician
- Instrument: Piano
- Years active: 1964–2024

Tony Parkes (November 10, 1949 – May 6, 2024) was an American professional square dance, contra dance and folk dance caller and choreographer who was active in the region surrounding Boston, Massachusetts, in the United States.

He wrote the book Contra Dance Calling – A Basic Text in 1992 and updated it in 2010.

== Early life ==
Parkes was born in 1949 in New York City, and grew up in Greenwich Village, Manhattan. His father, Philip Parkes, was a department store advertising executive, working for Lord & Taylor in New York and later for Emporium-Capwell in San Francisco. His mother, Katherine Parkes, was a law librarian who worked for the Institute of Judicial Administration at the New York University School of Law, and later for the Alameda County Law Library in the San Francisco Bay Area.

== Calling career ==
Parkes studied contra and square calling with several well-known callers, including Ralph Page. He began calling folk dances in 1964 and called dances in 35 states, Belgium, the Czech Republic, Denmark, Germany, England, and Canada.

He wrote more than 90 dances, with many published in the compilations Shadrack's Delight and Son of Shadrack.

He also taught at dance events at well-known locations including Pinewoods Camp and the John C. Campbell Folk School and called at the New England Folk Festival every year from 1969 until 2023.

Parkes served on the boards of the Country Dance Society (Boston Centre), the New England Folk Festival Association, and the Folk Arts Center of New England. He co-founded the band Yankee Ingenuity.

== Personal life and death ==
In 1973, Parkes moved to the Boston area where he lived with his wife, Beth Parkes, in Billerica, Massachusetts. Beth Parkes is also a square and contra dance caller.

Parkes was a Jeopardy! champion during 1989.

Tony Parkes survived colon cancer in 2018, but was diagnosed with a brain tumor in November 2023. He died on May 6, 2024.
