= Flurry =

Flurry may refer to:

- A snow flurry, a brief snow shower
- Flurry, a Super Mario series enemy character
- The Flurry Festival, an annual folk music and dance festival in Saratoga Springs, New York
- Flurry Heart, one of the supporting characters in My Little Pony: Friendship is Magic
- Flurry (company), a mobile analytics and monetization platform
- McFlurry, a McDonald's ice cream dessert
