= Contra dance =

Social folk dance with mixed European origins

Contra dancers at the 2019 Flurry Festival

Contra dance (also contradance, contra-dance and other variant spellings) is an American form of folk dancing made up of long lines of couples that is based in European folk dancing traditions. It has mixed origins from English country dance, Scottish country dance, and French dance styles (contredanse and anglaise) in the 17th century. Sometimes described as New England folk dance or Appalachian folk dance, contra dances can be found around the world, but are most common in the United States (periodically held in nearly every state), Canada, and other Anglophone countries.

A contra dance event is a social dance that one can attend without a partner. The dancers form couples, and the couples form sets of two couples in long lines starting from the stage and going down the length of the dance hall. Throughout the course of a dance, couples progress up and down these lines, dancing with each other couple in the line. The dance is led by a caller who teaches the sequence of moves, called "figures," in the dance before the music starts. In a single dance, a caller may include anywhere from six to twelve figures, which are repeated as couples progress up and down the lines. Each time through the dance takes 64 beats, after which the pattern is repeated. The essence of the dance is in following the pattern with your set and your line; since there is no required footwork, many people find contra dance easier to learn than other forms of social dancing.

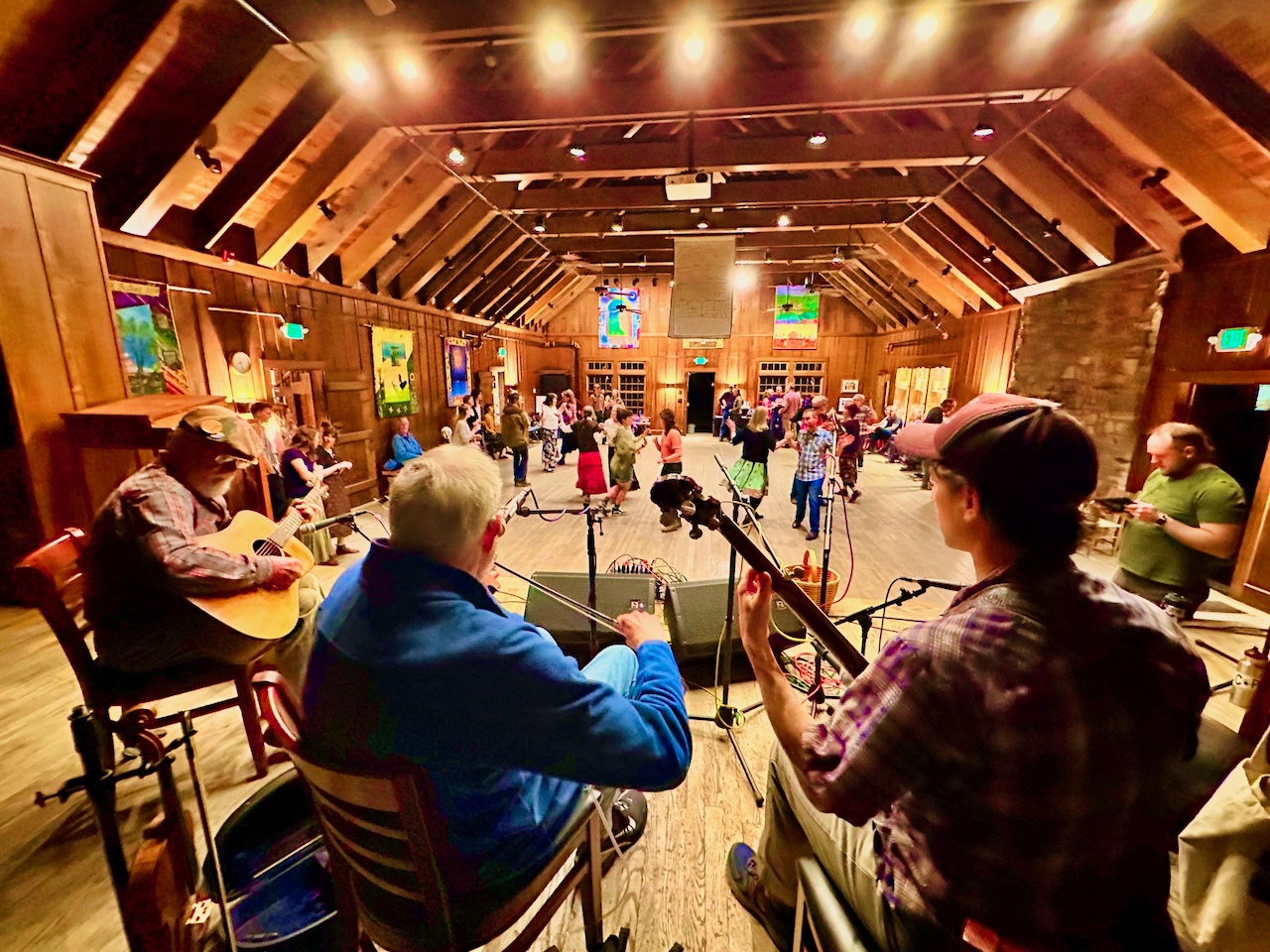
Musicians play for a contra dance at the John C. Campbell Folk School in Brasstown, North Carolina, 2023

Almost all contra dances are danced to live music. The music played includes, but is not limited to, Irish, Scottish, old-time, bluegrass and French-Canadian folk tunes. The fiddle is considered the core instrument, though other stringed instruments can be used, such as the guitar, banjo, bass and mandolin, as well as the piano, accordion, flute, clarinet and more. Techno contra dances are done to techno music, typically accompanied by DJ lighting. Music in a dance can consist of a single tune or a medley of tunes, and key changes during the course of a dance are common.

Many callers and bands perform for local contra dances, and some are hired to play for dances around the U.S. and Canada. Many dancers travel regionally (or even nationally) to contra dance weekends and week-long contra dance camps, where they can expect to find other dedicated and skilled dancers, callers, and bands.

== History ==
=== European origins ===
A contra dance called by Dudley Laufman in Richmond, New Hampshire, in 1964 or 1965

Contra dancers at a ball in Peterborough, New Hampshire, United States (silent video)

The contra dance's origins date to the mid 16th century with the emergence of the English country dance. At the end of the 17th century, English country dances and other British dance forms such as the jig, hornpipe, and Scottish reel were taken up by French dance masters. The French called these dances collectively anglaise (also known as anglois and angloise), and began creating their own dances and music in the style of the various dance forms from Britain. The anglaise inspired the development of the French contredanse (which roughly translated by sound "countrydance" to "contredanse") which was a blend of the dance music and steps of the English folk dance forms with traditional French folk dance steps and music.

The French contredanse thrived in the 17th and 18th centuries and was also adopted into French operas or other forms of French theatre. Composers also sometimes used a contredanse as a movement within chamber music or composition types such as symphonies. Note that the French contredanse should not be confused with the term contredanse anglaise which was another name for the French anglaise.

From the French court, the anglaise and contredanse spread across Continental Europe, and were assimilated into other European dance traditions where they developed regional differences in style and structure. For example, the Viennese anglaise, popular in 18th century Vienna, was written in suite form and always featured changes in meter. These dances from Continental Europe traveled back to Britain. They were in turn spread and reinterpreted in the United States.

=== Contra dance and the American assimilation of European folk dance ===
In the 18th century dances arrived to the United States not just from French and English immigrants, but also from German and Dutch settlers who brought their varying music and dance cultures with them that included different folk dances which all shaped the development of American contra dance. In the United States the term contra dance (an Americanized spelling of the French contradanse) emerged in c. 1780 and was used interchangeably with the term country dance. Over time the term became more closely associated with American folk dances. In some parts of New England such as New Hampshire, the term is spelled "contradances".

Contra dances were fashionable in the United States and were considered one of the most popular social dances across class lines in the late 18th century, though these events were usually referred to as "country dances" until the 1780s, when the term contra dance became more common to describe these events. One of the defining features of the American contra dance is the use of a "caller" who teaches dances to participants, leads musicians, plans dance order, and orchestrates the event. The European dance tradition did not use a caller, and dancers were expected to know the dances and steps prior to attending an event such as a ball in order to be allowed to participate.

In the mid-19th century, group dances started to decline in popularity in favor of quadrilles, lancers, and couple dances such as the waltz and polka. By the late 19th century, contras were mostly confined to rural settings. The contra dance tradition carried on primarily in towns within the northeastern portions of North America, such as Ohio, the Maritime provinces of Canada, and particularly in New England.

=== 20th century revivals ===
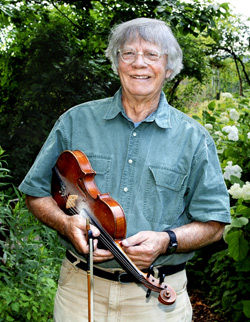
Caller and musician Dudley Laufman, a significant figure in the contra dance revival of the mid-20th century

As part of his 1920s campaign to revive American square dance and oppose contemporary jazz influences in the US, Henry Ford worked with dance coordinator Benjamin Lovett to initiate a dance program in Dearborn, Michigan, that included several folk dances, including contras. Ford also published a book titled Good Morning: After a Sleep of Twenty-Five Years, Old-Fashioned Dancing Is Being Revived in 1926 detailing steps for some contra dances. Through Ford's folk dance movement, the contra dance and its associated music influenced the development of country music when it emerged in the 1920s.

Independent from Ford, Ralph Page was influential in maintaining the New England tradition throughout the 1930s and 1940s. The New England contra dance tradition was also maintained in Vermont by the Ed Larkin Old Time Contra Dancers, formed by Edwin Loyal Larkin in 1934. Early dance camps, retreats, and weekends emerged in the 1930s and 1940s, such as Pinewoods Camp, in Plymouth, Massachusetts, which became primarily a music and dance camp in 1933, and NEFFA, the New England Folk Festival, also in Massachusetts, which began in 1944.

Concurrently there was national resurgence in the popularity of the square dance in America that began in the 1930s and reached a peak in the mid 1940s in both urban and rural America; partly due to the wide adoption of square dance education within public school curriculums in the United States. These curriculums sometimes included contra dances as well. A network of social square dance clubs for adults formed across the United States which laid a foundation for a similar organizational structure for contra dance that formed later.

Ted Sannella and Dudley Laufman were influential figures in maintaining the tradition of the contra dance in the 1950s and 1960s. Contra dance regained popularity in the 1960s as part of the broader American folk music revival, especially among young, counter-cultural dancers in Boston. In the 1970s contra dance was embraced more widely by an oppositional youth counterculture that became associated with anti-Vietnam War protests and the adoption of philosophies like communal living and a country-based lifestyle. This led to formation of contra-dance events and clubs in college towns and cities.

A BIDA contra dance in Cambridge, Massachusetts, during the COVID-19 pandemic

In the 1970s, Sannella and other callers introduced dance moves from English country dance to the contra dances (e.g. heys and right shoulder rounds). New dances, such as Shadrack's Delight by Tony Parkes, featured symmetrical dancing by all couples. (Previously, the active and inactive couples – see § Progression – had significantly different roles.) Double progression dances, popularized by Herbie Gaudreau, added to the aerobic nature of the dances, and one caller, Gene Hubert, wrote a quadruple progression dance, Contra Madness. Becket formation was introduced, with partners starting the dance next to each other in the line instead of opposite each other. The Brattleboro Dawn Dance started in 1976, and ran semiannually until its hiatus in 2020, due to the COVID-19 pandemic and a lack of staff.

In the early 1980s, Tod Whittemore started the first Saturday dance in the Peterborough Town House, which remains one of the more popular regional dances. The Peterborough dance influenced Bob McQuillen, who became a notable musician in New England. As musicians and callers moved to other locations, they founded contra dances in Michigan, Washington, Oregon, California, Texas and elsewhere.

=== Gender-free dances ===
Traditionally, contra dances were segregated by gender into two roles: gents for men and ladies for women. Although modern contra dances allow individuals to dance either role regardless of their gender, "gender-free" contra dances do not use the terms gents and ladies. These dances seek to be inclusive of LGBTQ+ people, and they often encourage dancers to dance whatever role they want to. Some individuals are against switching to gender-free terminology on the basis of tradition.

As part of his Gay & Lesbian Contra Dance series, Chris Ricciotti organized the first gender-free contra dance in 1989 at Jamaica Plain, MA using armbands as visual signals of roles to include a dancer that was uncomfortable identifying with the traditional role terms:

I ... remembered hearing about one group who used the convention of a tie or an armband to identify roles. I decided to try using this convention at the Jamaica Plain dance, ripping up an old bed sheet to make armbands and asking dancers who were dancing in the traditional gent's role to tie on one of these ribbons, and identifying them as "armbands" and those dancing the traditional ladies role, not wearing the armbands as the "barearms". This method ended up being an instance [sic] hit, and I started using this method of identification for all the gay community dances I went on to organize at that time. Since then some callers who have called at our community dances have shortened this identification "Bands" and "Bares" (Bears).

Following this, other LGBT contra dances began using the terms bands and bares, though mainstream dances continued to use the terms gents and ladies. In 1990, Ricciotti successfully hosted a session titled "Gender-Free Contra Dancing" at the New England Folk Festival despite the push-back of some attendees.

By the mid 2010s, callers and dancers had proposed many alternative gender-free terms such as jets and rubies, leads and follows, larks and ravens, and more. In 2014, the Circle Left dance in Oakland, CA became one of the first contra dances to adopt the terms larks and ravens, with the Berkeley, CA dance following shortly after. These terms were chosen for a few reasons: they have the same number of syllables as gents and ladies; they are phonetically distinct from the traditional terms; and the lark stands on the left while the raven stands on the right. More dances across the US adopted the terms larks and ravens regardless of whether they were LGBT-specific dances or not. In 2019, the term raven was widely replaced by robin, as the former term created conflict for dancers from the Indigenous Tlingit tribe, which has a binary moiety system of Raven and Eagle. Although gents and ladies are still commonly used, the terms larks and robins have since been adopted by many contra dances in both rural and urban areas, with callers typically using the terms preferred by the organizers of the local dance or dance event at which they are calling.

Since the late 2010s, some callers have begun to explore positional calling, which avoids the use any role terms by identifying dancers based on their individual position in the set. Louise Siddons has been a key figure in the instruction of positional calling.

== Events ==
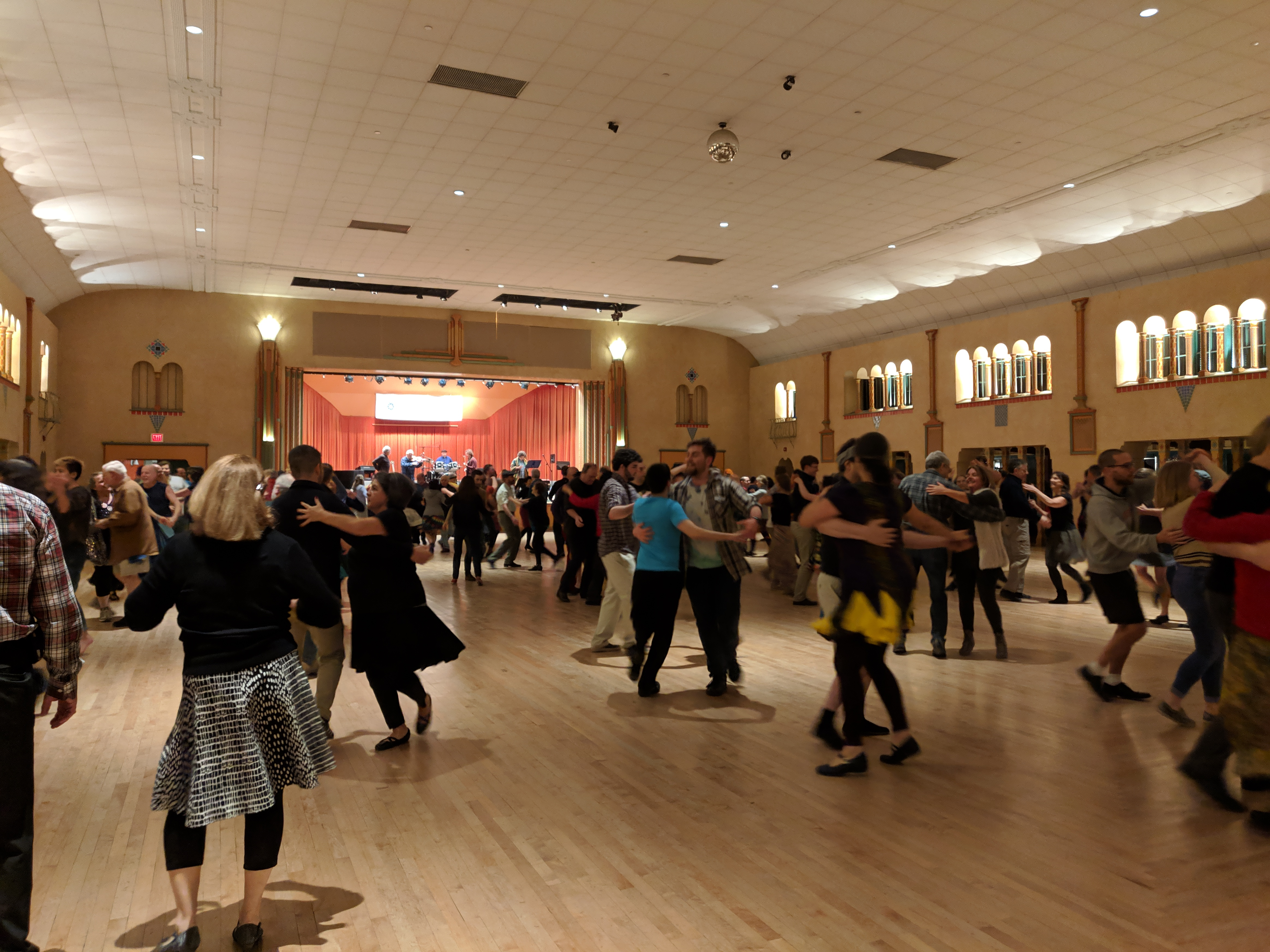
Contra dancers swing at a Friday night dance at Glen Echo Park in the suburbs of Washington, D.C.

Contra dances take place in more than 200 cities and towns across the U.S. (as of 2020), as well as in other countries.

Contra dance events are typically open to all, regardless of experience, unless explicitly stated otherwise. It is common to see dancers with a wide range of ages, from children to the elderly. Most dancers are white and middle or upper-middle class, though all are welcome. Contra dances are family-friendly, and alcohol consumption is not part of the culture. Many events offer beginner-level instructions prior to the dance. A typical evening of contra dance is three hours long, including an intermission. The event consists of a number of individual contra dances, each lasting about 15 minutes, and typically a band intermission with some waltzes, schottisches, polkas, or Swedish hambos. In some places, traditional square dances are thrown into the mix, sometimes at the discretion of the caller. Music for the evening is typically performed by a live band, playing jigs and reels from Ireland, Scotland, Canada, or the USA. The tunes may range from traditional, originating a century ago, to modern compositions including electric guitar, synth keyboard, and driving percussion – so long as the music fits the timing for contra dance patterns. Sometimes, a rock tune will be woven in.

Generally, a leader, known as a caller, will teach each individual dance just before the music for that dance begins. During this introductory walk-through, participants learn the dance by walking through the steps and formations, following the caller's instructions. The caller gives the instructions orally, and sometimes augments them with demonstrations of steps by experienced dancers in the group. The walk-through usually proceeds in the order of the moves as they will be done with the music; in some dances, the caller may vary the order of moves during the dance, a fact that is usually explained as part of the caller's instructions.

A pandemic era New Year's Eve contra dance in Greenfield, Massachusetts

After the walk-through, the music begins and the dancers repeat that sequence many times before that dance ends, often 10 to 15 minutes, depending on the length of the contra lines. Calls are normally given at least the first few times through, and often for the last. At the end of each dance, the dancers thank their partners. In North America, the norm at contra dances is to change partners after each dance. In the short break between individual dances, the dancers invite each other to dance. Booking ahead by asking partner or partners ahead of time for each individual dance is common at some venues, but has been discouraged by some.

Most contra dances do not have an expected dress code. No special outfits are worn, but comfortable and loose-fitting clothing that does not restrict movement is usually recommended. T-shirts are common. Many women wear skirts or dresses. Dancers often express that skirts are more fun and "twirly" to dance in regardless of gender, and it is relatively common for men to wear skirts in contra dance in addition to women. Low heeled, broken-in, soft-soled, non-marking shoes, such as dance shoes, sneakers, or sandals, are recommended and, in some places, required. As dancing can be aerobic, dancers are sometimes encouraged to bring a change of clothes.

As in any social dance, cooperation is vital to contra dancing. Since over the course of any single dance individuals interact with not just their partners but everyone else in the set, contra dancing might be considered a group activity. As will necessarily be the case when beginners are welcomed in by more practiced dancers, mistakes are made; most dancers are willing to help beginners in learning the steps. However, because the friendly, social nature of the dances can be misinterpreted or even abused, some groups have created anti-harassment policies.

== Form ==
A contra dance in Manhattan

=== Formations ===
Contra dances are arranged in long lines of couples. A pair of lines is called a set. Sets are generally arranged so they run the length of the hall, with the top of the set being the end closest to the band and caller, and the bottom of the set being the end farthest from the caller.

Couples consist of two people, traditionally one male and one female, though same-sex pairs are increasingly common. Traditionally the dancers are referred to as the lady and gent, though various other terms have been used: some dances have used men and women, rejecting ladies and gents as elitist; others have used gender-neutral role terms such as bares and bands, jets and rubies or larks and robins. Couples interact primarily with an adjacent couple for each round of the dance. Each sub-group of two interacting couples is known to choreographers as a minor set and to dancers as a foursome or hands four. Couples in the same minor set are neighbors. Minor sets originate at the head of the set, starting with the topmost dancers as the ones (the active couple or actives); the other couple are twos (or inactives). The ones are said to be above their neighboring twos; twos are below. If there is an uneven number of couples dancing, the bottom-most couple will wait out the first time through the dance.

There are four common ways of arranging couples in the minor sets: proper, improper, Becket, and triple formations. Traditionally, most dances were in the proper formation, with all the gents in one line and all the ladies in the other. Until the end of the nineteenth century, minor sets were most commonly triples. In the twentieth century, duple-minor dances became more common. Since the mid twentieth century, there has been a shift towards improper dances, in which gents and ladies alternate on each side of the set, being the most common formation. Triple dances have also lost popularity in modern contras, while Becket formation, in which dancers stand next to their partners, facing another couple, is a modern innovation.

=== Progression ===
A fundamental aspect of contra dancing is that, during a single dance, each dancer has one partner, but interacts with many different people. During a single dance, the same pattern is repeated over and over (one time through lasts roughly 30 seconds), but each time, a pair of dancers will dance with new neighbors (moving on to new neighbors is called progressing). Dancers do not need to memorize these patterns in advance, since the dance leader, or caller, will generally explain the pattern for this dance before the music begins, and give people a chance to walk through the pattern so dancers can learn the moves. The walk through also helps dancers understand how the dance pattern leads them toward new people each time. Once the music starts, the caller continues to describe each move until the dancers are comfortable with that dance pattern. The dance progression is built into the contra dance pattern as continuous motion with the music, and does not interrupt the dancing. While all dancers in the room are part of the same dance pattern, half of the couples in the room are moving toward the band at any moment and half are moving away, so when everybody steps forward, they find new people to dance with. Once a couple reaches the end of the set, they switch direction, dancing back along the set the other way.

A single dance runs around ten minutes, long enough to progress at least 15–20 times. If the sets are short to medium length the caller often tries to run the dance until each couple has danced with every other couple both as a one and a two and returned to where they started. A typical room of contra dancers may include about 120 people; but this varies from 30 people in smaller towns, to over 300 people in cities like Washington DC, Los Angeles, or New York. With longer sets (more than 60 people), one dance typically does not allow dancing with every dancer in the group.

== Choreography ==
Attendees of Youth Dance Weekend 2019 dance "Dela Says Yippee" by Dugan Murphy to music by Calluna

Contra dance choreography specifies the dance formation, the figures, and the sequence of those figures in a dance. Contra dance figures (with a few exceptions) do not have defined footwork; within the limits of the music and the comfort of their fellow dancers, individuals move according to their own taste.

Most contra dances consist of a sequence of about 6 to 12 individual figures, prompted by the caller in time to the music as the figures are danced. As the sequence repeats, the caller may cut down his or her prompting, and eventually drop out, leaving the dancers to each other and the music.

A figure is a pattern of movement that typically takes eight counts, although figures with four or 16 counts are also common. Each dance is a collection of figures assembled to allow the dancers to progress along the set (see "Progression", above).

A count (as used above) is one half of a musical measure, such as one quarter note in 2/4 time or three eighth notes in 6/8 time. A count may also be called a step, as contra dance is a walking form, and each count of a dance typically matches a single physical step in a figure.

Typical contra dance choreography comprises four parts, each 16 counts (8 measures) long. The parts are called A1, A2, B1 and B2. This nomenclature stems from the music: Most contra dance tunes (as written) have two parts (A and B), each 8 measures long, and each fitting one part of the dance. The A and B parts are each played twice in a row, hence, A1, A2, B1, B2. While the same music is generally played in, for example, parts A1 and A2, distinct choreography is followed in those parts. Thus, a contra dance is typically 64 counts, and goes with a 32 measure tune. Tunes of this form are called "square"; tunes that deviate from this form are called "crooked".

Sample contra dances:

- Traditional – the actives do most of the movement

Chorus jig (proper duple minor)

A1 (16) Actives down the outside and back. (The inactives stand still or substitute a swing).
A2 (16) Actives down the center, turn individually, come back, and cast off. (The inactives stand still for the first 3/4, take a step up the hall, and then participate in the cast).
B1 (16) Actives turn contra corners. (The inactives participate in half the turns.)
B2 (16) Actives meet in the middle for a balance and swing, end swing facing up. (The inactives stand still.)
Note: inactives will often clog in place or otherwise participate in the dance, even though the figures do not call for them to move.

- Modern – the dance is symmetrical for actives and inactives

"Hay in the Barn" by Chart Guthrie (improper duple minor)

A1 (16) Neighbors balance and swing
A2 (8) Ladies chain across, (8) half hey, ladies pass right shoulders to start.
B1 (16) Partners balance and swing.
B2 (8) Ladies chain across, (8) half hey, ladies pass right shoulders to start.

Many modern contra dances have these characteristics:

- longways for as many as will
- first couples improper, or Becket formation
- flowing choreography
- no-one stationary for more than 16 beats (e.g. first couple balance and swing, finish facing down to make lines of four)
- containing at least one swing and normally both a partner swing and a neighbor swing
- the vast majority of the moves from a set of well-known moves that the dancers know already
- composed mostly of moves that keep all dancers connected
- generally danced to 32 bar jigs or reels played at between 110 and 130 bpm
- danced with a smooth walk with many spins and twirls

An event which consists primarily (or solely) of dances in this style is sometimes referred to as a "modern urban contra dance".

== Music ==
Calluna plays Money Musk at Youth Dance Weekend 2019 in Weston, Vermont

The most common contra dance repertoire is rooted in the Anglo-Celtic tradition as it developed in North America. Irish, Scottish, French Canadian, and Old-time tunes are common, and Klezmer tunes have also been used. The old-time repertoire includes very few of the jigs common in the others.

Tunes used for a contra dance are nearly always "square" 64-beat tunes, in which one time through the tune is each of two 16-beat parts played twice (this is notated AABB). However, any 64-beat tune will do; for instance, three 8-beat parts could be played AABB AACC, or two 8-beat parts and one 16-beat part could be played AABB CC. Tunes not 64 beats long are called "crooked" and are almost never used for contra dancing, although a few crooked dances have been written as novelties. Contra tunes are played at a narrow range of tempos, between 108 and 132 bpm.

Fiddles are considered to be the primary melody instrument in contra dancing, though other stringed instruments can also be used, such as the mandolin or banjo, in addition to a few wind instruments; for example, the accordion. The piano, guitar, and double bass are frequently found in the rhythm section of a contra dance band. Occasionally, percussion instruments are also used in contra dancing, such as the Irish bodhran or less frequently, the dumbek or washboard. The last few years have seen some of the bands incorporate the Quebecois practice of tapping feet on a board while playing an instrument (often the fiddle).

Until the 1970s it was traditional to play a single tune for the duration of a contra dance (about 5 to 10 minutes). Since then, contra dance musicians have typically played tunes in sets of two or three related (and sometimes contrasting) tunes, though single-tune dances are again becoming popular with some northeastern bands. In the Celtic repertoires it is common to change keys with each tune. A set might start with a tune in G, switch to a tune in D, and end with a tune in Bm. Here, D is related to G as its dominant (5th), while D and Bm share a key signature of two sharps. In the old-time tradition the musicians will either play the same tune for the whole dance, or switch to tunes in the same key. This is because the tunings of the five-string banjo are key-specific. An old-time band might play a set of tunes in D, then use the time between dances to retune for a set of tunes in A. (Fiddlers also may take this opportunity to retune; tune- or key-specific fiddle tunings are uncommon in American Anglo-Celtic traditions other than old-time.)

In the Celtic repertoires it is most common for bands to play sets of reels and sets of jigs. However, since the underlying beat structure of jigs and reels is the same (two "counts" per bar) bands will occasionally mix jigs and reels in a set.

Some of the most popular contra dance bands in recent years are Great Bear, Perpetual E-Motion, Buddy System, Crowfoot, Elixir, the Mean Lids, Nor'easter, Nova, Pete's Posse, the Stringrays, the Syncopaths, and Wild Asparagus.

=== Techno contras ===
A BIDA techno contra dance in Cambridge, Massachusetts, U.S., in 2022

In recent years, younger contra dancers have begun establishing "crossover contra" or "techno contra" – contra dancing to techno, hip-hop, and other modern forms of music. While challenging for DJs and callers, the fusion of contra patterns with moves from hip-hop, tango, and other forms of dance has made this form of contra dance a rising trend since 2008. Techno differs from other contra dancing in that it is usually done to recorded music, although there are some bands that play live for techno dances. Techno has become especially prevalent in Asheville, North Carolina, but regular techno contra dance series are spreading up the East Coast to locales such as Charlottesville, Virginia; Washington, D.C.; Amherst, Massachusetts; Greenfield, Massachusetts; and various North Carolina dance communities, with one-time or annual events cropping up in locations farther west, including California, Portland, Oregon, and Washington state. They also sometimes appear as late night events during contra dance weekends. In response to the demand for techno contra, a number of contra dance callers have developed repertoires of recorded songs to play that go well with particular contra dances; these callers are known as DJs. A kind of techno/traditional contra fusion has arisen, with at least one band, Buddy System, playing live music melded with synth sounds for techno contra dances.

== See also ==
- English country dance
- Ceili dance
- Country Dance and Song Society
- Dutch crossing
- International folk dance
- New England Folk Festival
- Quadrille
- Virginia reel (dance)

== Sources ==
- Carlin, Richard (2005). Folk. New York: Infobase. ISBN 0816069786.
- Dart, Mary McNab (1995). Contra Dance Choreography: A Reflection of Social Change. New York & London: Garland Publishing. ISBN 0-8153-1984-3.
- Hast, Dorothea E. (1993). "Performance, Transformation, and Community: Contra Dance in New England". Dance Research Journal. 25 (1): 21–32. doi:10.2307/1478188. JSTOR 1478188. S2CID 147023859.
- Holenko, John (2010). Contra Dance Encyclopedia. Mel Bay Publications. p. 6. ISBN 978-1609743772.
- Horton, Laurel (2001). "Material Expressions of Communality among Dance Groups". Western Folklore. 60 (2/3): 203–226. doi:10.2307/1500377. JSTOR 1500377.
- La Chapelle, Peter (2011). "'Dances Partake of the Racial Characteristics of the People Who Dance Them': Nordicism, Antisemitism, and Henry Ford's Old-Time Music and Dance Revival". In Zuckerman, Bruce; Kun, Josh; Ansell, Lisa (eds.). The Song Is Not the Same : Jews and American Popular Music. West Lafayette, Indiana: Purdue University Press for the USC Casden Institute for the Study of the Jewish Role in American Life. pp. 29–70. ISBN 978-1557535863.
- Laufman, Jacqueline; Laufman, Dudley (2009). Traditional Barn Dances with Calls & Fiddling. Champaign, Illinois: Human Kinetics. ISBN 978-0736076128.
- Ledgin, Stephanie P. (2010). Discovering Folk Music. ABC-CLIO. p. 17. ISBN 978-0275993870.
- Nielsen, Erica M. (2011). Folk Dancing. Santa Barbara: ABC-CLIO. ISBN 978-0313376894.
- Peterson, Davis R. (2000). Ray Broadus Browne & Pat Browne (ed.). Defining concise guide to United States popular culture. Bowling Green, Ohio: Bowling Green State University Popular Press. ISBN 0879728213.
- Pittman, Anne M.; Waller, Marlys S.; Dark, Cathy L. (2015). Dance a While: A Handbook for Folk, Square, Contra, and Social Dance (10th ed.). Waveland Press. ISBN 978-1478629511.
- Sannella, Ted (1982). Balance and Swing: A Collection of Fifty-five Squares, Contras and Triplets in the New England Tradition With Music for Each Dance. Northampton, Massachusetts: Country Dance and Song Society. ISBN 0-917024-05-2.
- Snyder, Andrew (2019). "Contraculture: Bird Names and the Degendering of Contra Dance". Yearbook for Traditional Music. 51: 187–215. doi:10.1017/ytm.2019.3. JSTOR 48564258. S2CID 212795287.
- Spalding, Susan Eike (2014). Appalachian Dance: Creativity and Continuity in Six Communities. University of Illinois Press. ISBN 978-0252096457.
