= Ted Sannella =

American contra dance caller

Ted Sannella (August 14, 1928 – November 18, 1995) was a professional square dance, contra dance and international folk dance caller and choreographer who was active in the region surrounding Boston, Massachusetts, in the United States. He was a seminal figure in the contra dance folk revival in the United States in the mid to late 20th century.

== Early life and career ==
Ted Sannella was born in Revere, Massachusetts. He graduated from Revere High School in 1945, and in 1949 graduated from Tufts College in Medford, receiving degrees in biology and chemistry. He worked as pharmacist at Richardson Drug in Concord, Massachusetts, for many years. He retired after 35 years as a pharmacist and moved to Wiscasset, Maine, in 1989. He died November 18, 1995, at the age of 67.

== Dance career ==
Sannella devoted much of his adult life to traditional New England dance as a caller, choreographer, dancer, and leader. He began calling professionally in 1946 and organized dance series in Cambridge, Westport Point, and Concord, Massachusetts, and in his final years, North Whitefield, Maine. He was influential as a revered and well-liked caller, as a choreographer through his social dance compositions and books, and via his cheerful attention to teaching about the pleasures of joy and style in social dance. His vigor, energy and perspective influenced many callers and dancers, and his dance compositions are regularly seen today at contra dances, 20 and 30 years after their original composition.

Sannella was long involved with the New England Folk Festival Association (NEFFA) as a leader and board member. He served as president of NEFFA and the North of Boston Callers Association and was also on the board of the nationally-oriented Country Dance and Song Society. His contributions to social dance were recognized via honorary or life memberships in the Folk Arts Center of New England and the Country Dance Society, Boston Centre. His multi-faceted and generous involvement with dance and dance leadership, experience and longevity, earned him the moniker The Dean of New England Callers.

One of Sannella's memorable choreographic innovations, inspired by the three-couple English country dance set dance, was to compose "triplets" suitable to contra dance tempo reels and jigs. His 41 published triplets were commonly known as Ted's Triplets. Triplets are still composed, and sometimes seen on the dance floor.

Sannella was very interested in the history of dance, and he possessed an extensive collection of 500-plus dance books and more than 3,000 recordings. He was a careful note-taker, and his dance cards indicate his opinion of the best tunes to go with each dance. His archive consisting of published materials, 50 boxes of personal papers and his dance cards, invaluable to any American folk-dance researcher or present-day caller, is now in the possession of the University of New Hampshire special collection entitled the New Hampshire Library of Traditional Music & Dance.

== Publications ==
- Sannella, Ted (1982). Balance and Swing: A collection of fifty-five squares, contras and triplets in the New England tradition with music for each dance. Northampton, Massachusetts: Country Dance and Song Society. ISBN 0-917024-05-2.
- Sannella, Ted (1996). Swing the Next: A second collection of squares, contras, triplets and circles in the New England tradition, with music for each dance. Northampton, Massachusetts: Country Dance and Song Society. ISBN 0-917024-05-2.
- Sannella, Ted (2005). Calling Traditional New England Squares. Northampton, Massachusetts: Country Dance and Song Society. ISBN 0-917024-16-8.
- Jennings, Larry; Dan Pearl; Ted Sannella (2004). The Contra Connection & Basically for Callers: Reprints from the Country Dance and Song Society NEWS (2nd ed.). Northampton, Massachusetts: Country Dance and Song Society. ISBN 0-917024-14-1.
