= Yankee Dutch crossing =

Dance performed in a formation of 8 couples

Yankee Dutch crossing is the name of a dance performed in a 4-by-4 square formation of 8 couples (16 dancers). The original version, called simply Dutch Crossing, was choreographed in the English country dance style by Ernst van Brakel of the Netherlands in 1990. In 2004, contra dance caller Joseph Pimentel modified the choreography in the American style, sometimes called Yankee Dutch crossing to distinguish it from the original. Any number of squares can perform the dance simultaneously. It is not normally found at monthly, bi-monthly or weekly dances. The most likely venues are multi-day dance weekends or weeks, (Note: Examples are Roanoke Railroader, CDH, and Footfall.) where it is taught in sessions of one hour or longer.

== Description ==
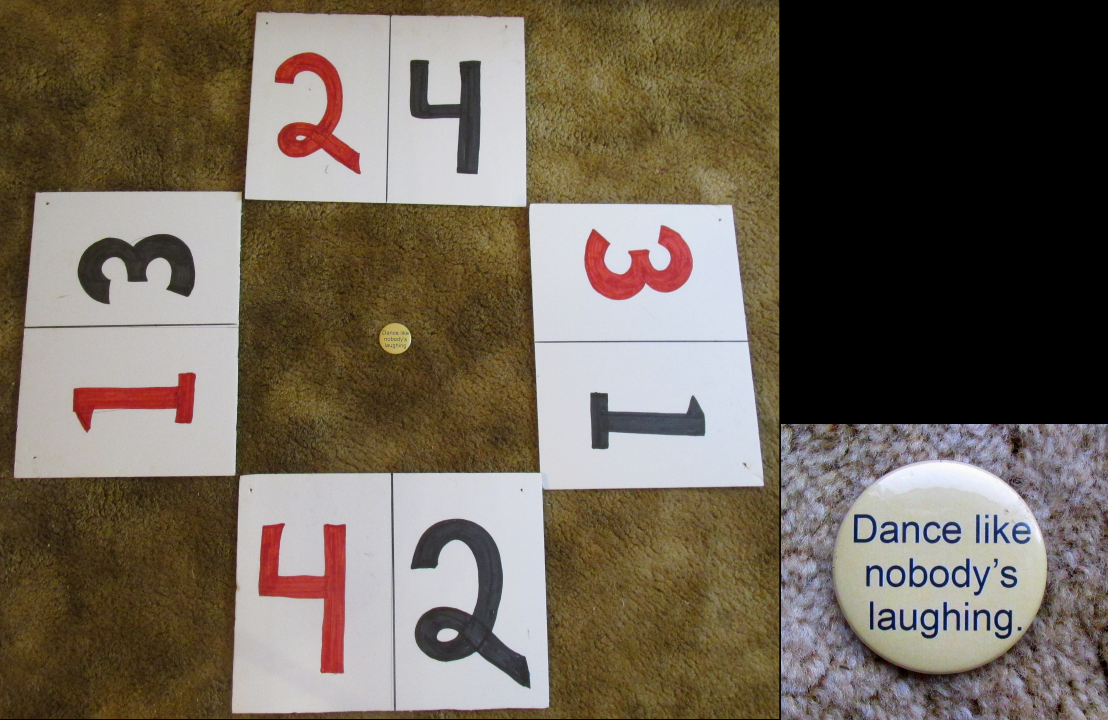
Four large signs, each with a red and a black numeral are shown. During a teaching session of the dance Dutch Crossing, they are displayed on the four sides of a room and referred to as "wall numbers" or "orientations". Half of the dancers will use the black numbers and half will use the red numbers. So when the dance instructor announces "Face wall number 3" (for example), the dancers will be facing each other in opposite directions.

The square of 16 dancers comprises 4 pairs of couples, facing each other, in the corners of the square. These pairs of "neighbors" will remain together throughout the dance, except for temporary departures and returns... always to the original corner of the square. The dance has four major parts, which are all identical, except for the orientation of the paired couples, which changes by 90° from one part to the next. Each major part has two minor parts. In the first minor part, the four neighbors interact with either of the two adjacent corner foursomes, which alternates from one orientation to the next. In the second minor part, the diagonally opposite members of each foursome interact only with the similarly-positioned members of the other foursomes. Effectively, the square can be described as two "teams" of eight, doing very different things in the same shared space. Each team also divides into 2 groups of four. Four members of the "X team" traverse one of the diagonals of the square (from which the name Dutch Crossing derives), across and back. The other four members traverse the other diagonal. The groups interact with each other in the middle and with members of the "O team" at the corners. Simultaneously, eight members of the "O team" perform a grand right and left around the circumference of the square. The role of each dancer alternates between "X team" and "O team" as the major parts cycle through the four orientations. Understandably, it is common for a square to disintegrate before all four major parts are completed. But that is part of the dance's appeal.

== See also ==
- A step-by-step choreography can be found at 6+ Couple dances
