= Dudley Laufman =

American dance caller (1931–2026)

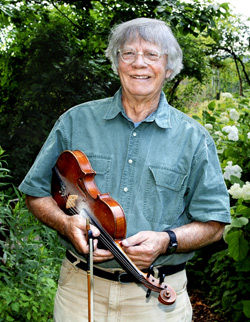
- Laufman in 2009

Background information
- Born: William Dudley Laufman; February 7, 1931; Newton, Massachusetts, U.S.
- Died: July 13, 2026 (aged 95) Canterbury, New Hampshire, U.S.
- Genre: Dance
- Occupations: Caller, musician
- Instruments: Fiddle; accordion; concertina; harmonica
- Labels: F&W, Front Hall, Two Fiddles
- Spouses: Cynthia Dunbar (divorced) Patty Windus (divorced) Jacqueline Gilman (divorced)
- Partner: Nanci Aguiar

William Dudley Laufman (February 7, 1931 – July 13, 2026) was an American contra and barn dance caller and musician widely credited with having helped spur the revival of contra dance in the 20th century.

Laufman grew up in Massachusetts and first encountered contra dancing at a dairy farm in New Hampshire. He moved to New Hampshire in 1952 and began calling and playing for "Dudley Dances", which became popular with hippies in the 1960s and led to him averaging 300 or more engagements per year in the 1970s. He later turned his focus to traditional barn dances, which he taught to children.

Laufman was noted for his charisma. He lived on a rural homestead and wrote numerous books of poetry. In 2009, he received a National Heritage Fellowship from the National Endowment for the Arts, the U.S. government's highest honor in the folk and traditional arts.

== Early life ==
Laufman was born in Newton, Massachusetts, on February 7, 1931, and grew up in the nearby town of Arlington. He was the eldest of five children. His father, M. Miller, was a businessman, and his mother, Marjorie (née Dick), was a civil rights activist.

Laufman attended his first dance as a boy while working summers as a dairy farmer at the Mistwold Farm in Fremont, New Hampshire, in 1947. His boss's wife hosted "kitchen junkets" as a community gathering after work, which involved singing hymns and then removing furniture and dancing folk dances called from Henry Ford's Good Morning collection.

== Contra calling career ==
Laufman later attended the Norfolk County Agricultural High School in Walpole, Massachusetts, where there were square dances every Monday night. There he met caller Ralph Page, who became his mentor. He took up calling in 1948, modeling his style after Page's, after a warm winter disrupted his ice hockey hobby and because he noticed that callers received romantic interest from women.

Laufman's dances became known as "Dudley Dances". They became popular with adherents of the back-to-the-land movement of the 1950s. At times, he was the only remaining caller of contra dances with live music.

In 1952, Laufman graduated with an associate's degree from the Stockbridge School of Agriculture at the University of Massachusetts and moved to Walpole, New Hampshire. He worked as an occupational therapist in Brattleboro, Vermont, from 1952 to 1955, followed by a stint at the New Hampshire State Hospital in Concord and as a proofreader for a typesetter.

A contra dance called and played by Laufman in Richmond, New Hampshire, in 1964 or 1965

Laufman's first wife, Cynthia, gave him a fiddle in 1957 and he began to learn to play. He taught himself in part by watching fiddler Dick Richardson, who played for the dances he called. He also learned the accordion, concertina, melodeon, and harmonica, and used them at dances to accompany his calling. He composed some tunes, including "Mistwold" and "Patty's Orange Cape". In 1959, he moved to Canterbury, New Hampshire.

In 1965, he was hired to perform at the Newport Folk Festival in Rhode Island to a 16,000-person crowd. Together with other musicians who went there with him, he founded the Canterbury Country Dance Orchestra that year. His dances became popular with hippies belonging to the countercultural movement of the 1960s.

In the 1970s, his orchestra averaged 300 or more engagements per year, mostly in New England. The tradition spread across the United States as dancers moved to other regions.

During this period, other bands and callers also began working dances. More aerobic "modern urban" contra dances, in which there was no longer an inactive couple, came into fashion. These were of less interest to Laufman, so he turned his attention to traditional barn dances. Beginning in 1978, he started working with the New Hampshire Artists-in-the-Schools program, teaching dances to children.

== Personal life ==
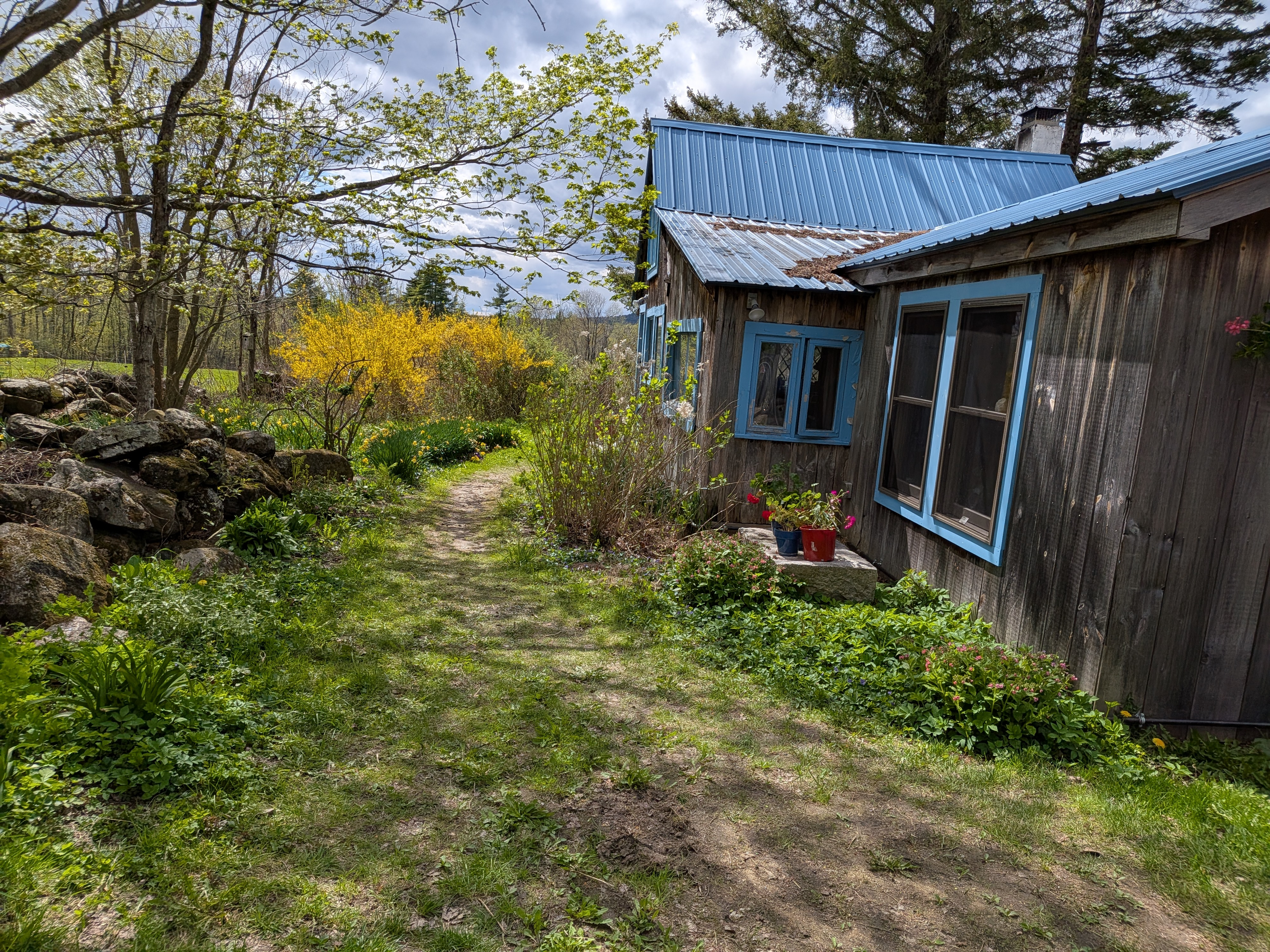
Laufman's house, "Wind in the Timothy"

Laufman was noted for his charisma. A Quaker, he was a conscientious objector to the Korean War. He was married three times, to Cynthia Dunbar, Patty Windus, and Jacqueline Gilman, and partnered toward the end of his life with Nanci Aguiar. He had five children.

From 1959 until his death, Laufman lived in Canterbury in a house called "Wind in the Timothy" (a reference to the grass species) which he built, with assistance from Cynthia Dunbar, on a 1.75-acre (0.71 ha) plot. It initially had no electricity or running water (a bathroom was later added). His home garden provided much of his food.

Laufman enjoyed writing poetry and admired the Scottish poet Robert Burns. His poetry covers an eclectic range of topics, including romance, farming, nature, folk music, and folk stories. It was praised in the media for his use of metaphor and genuineness.

== Death and legacy ==
Although Laufman recovered from a fractured hip in November 2025, his health began to decline after that. He died on July 13, 2026, at his home in Canterbury, at the age of 95. He received a natural burial in a clearing at the edge of his property at a gravesite marked with timothy grass.

In a New York Times obituary, dance historian David Millstone described him as "the single most important individual in creating nationwide interest in contra dancing".

== Awards and honors ==
- In 1990, the University of New Hampshire Archives approached Laufman to donate his recordings, writings, personal photographs and other materials to a special collection, which was named the "Dudley Laufman Collection No. 107".
- In 2001, he received the New Hampshire Governor's Arts Award for Folk Heritage, and received several proclamations through the years, including one in his final days June 22, 2026.
- In 2007, Laufman received the Lifetime Contribution Award from the Country Dance and Song Society.
- Laufman was a recipient of a 2009 National Heritage Fellowship awarded by the National Endowment for the Arts, which is the United States government's highest honor in the folk and traditional arts.
- The recreation barn at Camp Quinebarge, a children's sleep away summer camp, on Lake Kanasatka in Moultonborough, New Hampshire, which hosted "Dudley Dances" for 50 years, is named in his honor.

== Works ==
- Okay, Let's Try a Contra, Men on the Right, Ladies on the Left, Up and Down the Hall; or Blow Away the Morning Dew and Other Country Dances. New York: Country Dance Society. 1973. ISBN 9780917024023.
- With Nash, Corinne (1992). Dick Richardson: Old Time New Hampshire Fiddler. ASIN B0047OS0XY.
- With Laufman, Jacqueline (2001). White Mountain Reel: Book & Music CD of Eleven Dances With Calls and Without. Canterbury, New Hampshire: Wind in the Timothy Press. ISBN 9780971332607.

=== Poetry ===
Laufman published numerous poetry books. His earlier works were small, self-published chapbooks, but beginning with An Orchard and a Garden he published more substantial editions. His titles include:

- I Hear Ringing Reels. Canterbury, New Hampshire: Wind in the Timothy Press. 1962.
- The Wolfhunters. Canterbury, New Hampshire: Wind in the Timothy Press. 1964.
- Wind in the Timothy: Poems. Canterbury, New Hampshire: Wind in the Timothy Press. 1965. ASIN B00KSL4YAI.
- Beg of Foxes. Concord, New Hampshire: Gibson's Bookstore. 1966. ASIN B000ZGLFDA.
- Wee Herd's Whistle: New Poems. Cabot, Vermont: Vermont Stoveside Press. 1967. ASIN B06Y4FG4R1.
- An Orchard and a Garden. Dublin, New Hampshire: William Bauhan Press. 1974. ISBN 978-0-87233-026-9.
- A Dancing Master's Diary: Poems and Five Dances. Canterbury, New Hampshire: Wind in the Timothy Press. 1981.
- Mouth Music: Poems and Prose Poems. Canterbury, New Hampshire: Wind in the Timothy Press. 2001.
- Bull. Canterbury, New Hampshire: Wind in the Timothy Press. 2003.
- How Contra Dancing Was Invented: And Other Poems of Music and Dance. Canterbury, New Hampshire: Wind in the Timothy Press. 2003.
- Smoke Screen and Other Poems. Johnstown, Ohio: Pudding House Publications. 2003. ISBN 978-1-58998-254-3.
- With Laufman, Jacqueline (2005). The Stone Man: Shaker Brother Peter Ayers, 1760–1857. Canterbury, New Hampshire: Canterbury Shaker Village. ISBN 978-0-913117-03-3.
- Walking Sticks: Poems. Ossipee, New Hampshire: Beech River Books. 2007. ISBN 978-0-9793778-2-2.
- Scything. Brattleboro, Vermont: Longhouse. 2010.
- She Plumb Ned, She More'n Plumb: Poems and Stories. Ossipee, New Hampshire: Beech River Books. 2011. ISBN 978-0-9825214-9-6.
- Bull and More Bull. Brattleboro, Vermont: Longhouse. 2015. ISBN 978-1-929048-45-8.
- The Islandian Poems and Fables. Brattleboro, Vermont: Longhouse. 2015. ISBN 978-1-929048-25-0.
- This Is the Day We've Been Waiting For. Portsmouth, New Hampshire: Piscataqua Press. 2017. ISBN 978-1-944393-47-2.

== Discography ==
With Jacqueline Laufman

- Where'd You Get Them Great Chunes (alongside the Sugar River String Band) (Two Fiddles, 2007)

With Canterbury Country Orchestra

- Mistwold (F&W Records F74-FW-5, 1974)
- Swinging On A Gate (Front Hall Records, 1974)
- Canterbury Country Dance Orchestra With Dudley Laufman (F&W Records CD-01-FW8, 2001)
- Welcome Here Again (F&W 74WWC, 2016)
- Here's to Every Country Dancer (F&W F72-FW-3, 2019)
