= Wild Asparagus =

Contra dance band from Western Massachusetts, United States

- Origin: Connecticut River Valley
- Genres: Old-time music; Irish traditional music
- Years active: 1982–present
- Spinoff of: Swallowtail
- Members: David Cantieni; George Marshall; Ann Percival; Becky Tracy
- Past members: Van Kaynor; Mary Lea; Susan Sternberg; Sam Bartlett; Stuart Kenney
- Website: wildasparagus.com

Wild Asparagus is a contra dance band from Western Massachusetts that has toured throughout the United States and Canada. It’s Becky Tracy on fiddle, George Marshall on concertina and bodhran, Ann Percival on guitar and piano, and David Cantieni on winds. They usually have a bass player and some of their regular players include Corey DiMario, Mark Murphy, Harry Aceto and Ralph Gordon among others.

== Discography ==
- In Season (1985)
- Music from A Little Known Planet (1987)
- Tone Roads (1990)
- Call of the Wild (1993)
- From the Floor Up (1997)
- Wherever You Go (2001)
- The Best of Wild Asparagus (2003)
- Live at the Guiding Star Grange (2009)

David Cantieni solo album

- Red Rock (w/ Becky Tracy, George Marshall, Mark Roberts, Stuart Kenney, Rick Ruggles, Mary Witt, Ann Percival, and Pete Sutherland) (1996)
