= Great Bear (band) =

North American contra dance band

- Also known as: Great Bear Trio; Andrew and Noah Band
- Origin: New York, United States
- Genres: Folk, Contra
- Years active: 2000–2018
- Labels: Great Bear Records
- Members: Andrew VanNorstrand; Noah VanNorstrand; Kim Yerton; Chris Miller; Rebecca Bosworth-Clemens; Dana Billings
- Website: www.greatbearmusic.com

Great Bear was a North American contra dance band composed of brothers Andrew and Noah VanNorstrand, their mother Kim Yerton, Chris Miller, Rebecca Bosworth-Clemens, and Dana Billings. It was known as the Great Bear Trio when touring with the first three members, and as the Andrew and Noah Band when touring with only the VanNorstrand brothers. It was the most popular contra dance band in the world, as measured by annual festival bookings. Great Bear made its last appearance at a contra dance in December 2018 in Columbus, Ohio.

== History ==
The Great Bear Trio became well-established within the contra dance scene in the United States and Canada in the 2000s, and has been frequently booked at major contra dance events in the United States and Canada from that time onward. In 2004, the VanNorstrand brothers were featured on A Prairie Home Companion. Since 2015, the VanNorstrand brothers have also been touring with Audrey Knuth and Amy Englesberg as "Wake Up Robin".

== Musical style ==
Great Bear draws from a mix of genres, including those traditionally used for contra dance music, such as jigs and reels. In the 2010s, its style became increasingly modern, mixing traditional fiddle tunes infused with pop-rock dance grooves and original compositions in the same vein. The band's website states that it is known for its "epic dynamics, genre-transcending arrangements and deep dance grooves". Bluegrass Unlimited described the VanNorstrand brothers' music as "a blend of oldtime country and bluegrass, swing and jazz, Celtic and contra, and alternative folk-rock". Another reviewer said it "strongly implies the sound of traditional music in places, and also creates an interesting stylistic mix, from old-time Appalachian to rock to country".

== Band members ==
- Andrew VanNorstrand – guitars and fiddle
- Noah VanNorstrand – fiddle, mandolin, and feet
- Kim Yerton – piano
- Chris Miller – saxophones and banjo
- Rebecca Bosworth-Clemens – clarinet
- Dana Billings – drums

== Discography ==
- Dancing Again (2006)
- Rawr! (2011)
- Magic Fantasy Dream Dance (2016)
