= Flurry Festival =

Annual folk dance and music festival in Saratoga Springs, New York, United States

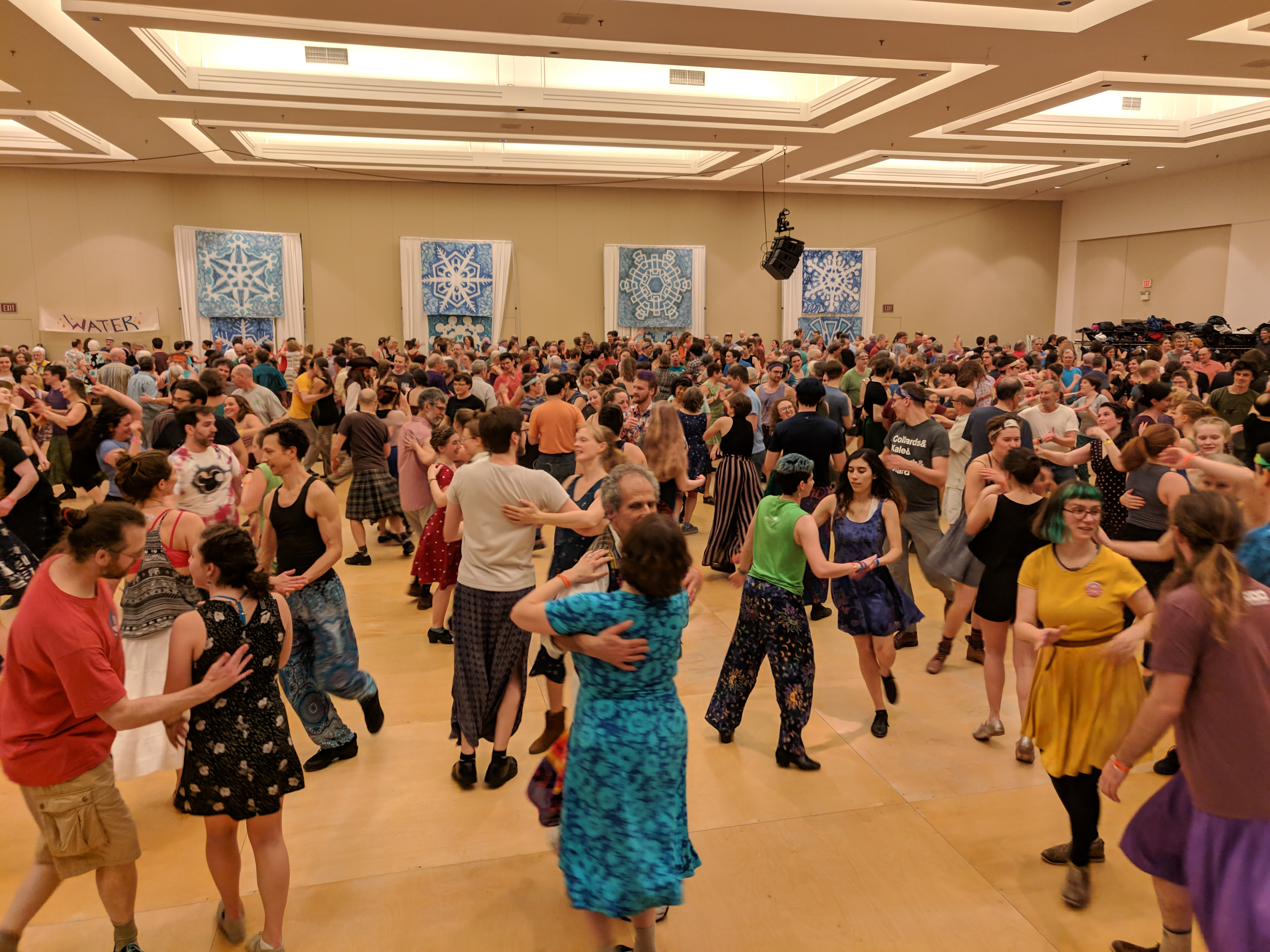
- Contra dancers at the 2019 Flurry Festival
- Genre: Folk dance, folk music
- Dates: Friday–Sunday the third weekend of February
- Locations: Saratoga Springs, New York, United States of America
- Years active: 1988–present
- Website: www.flurryfestival.org

The Flurry Festival (previously the Dance Flurry Festival and often abbreviated to just the Flurry or Flurry) is an annual weekend festival held in February in Saratoga Springs, New York. The festival includes one of the largest contra dances in the U.S., as well as other types of traditional folk dance and music, and draws over 5000 attendees and 400 performers every year. It was first held in 1988 and is run by the nonprofit DanceFlurry Organization.

== History ==
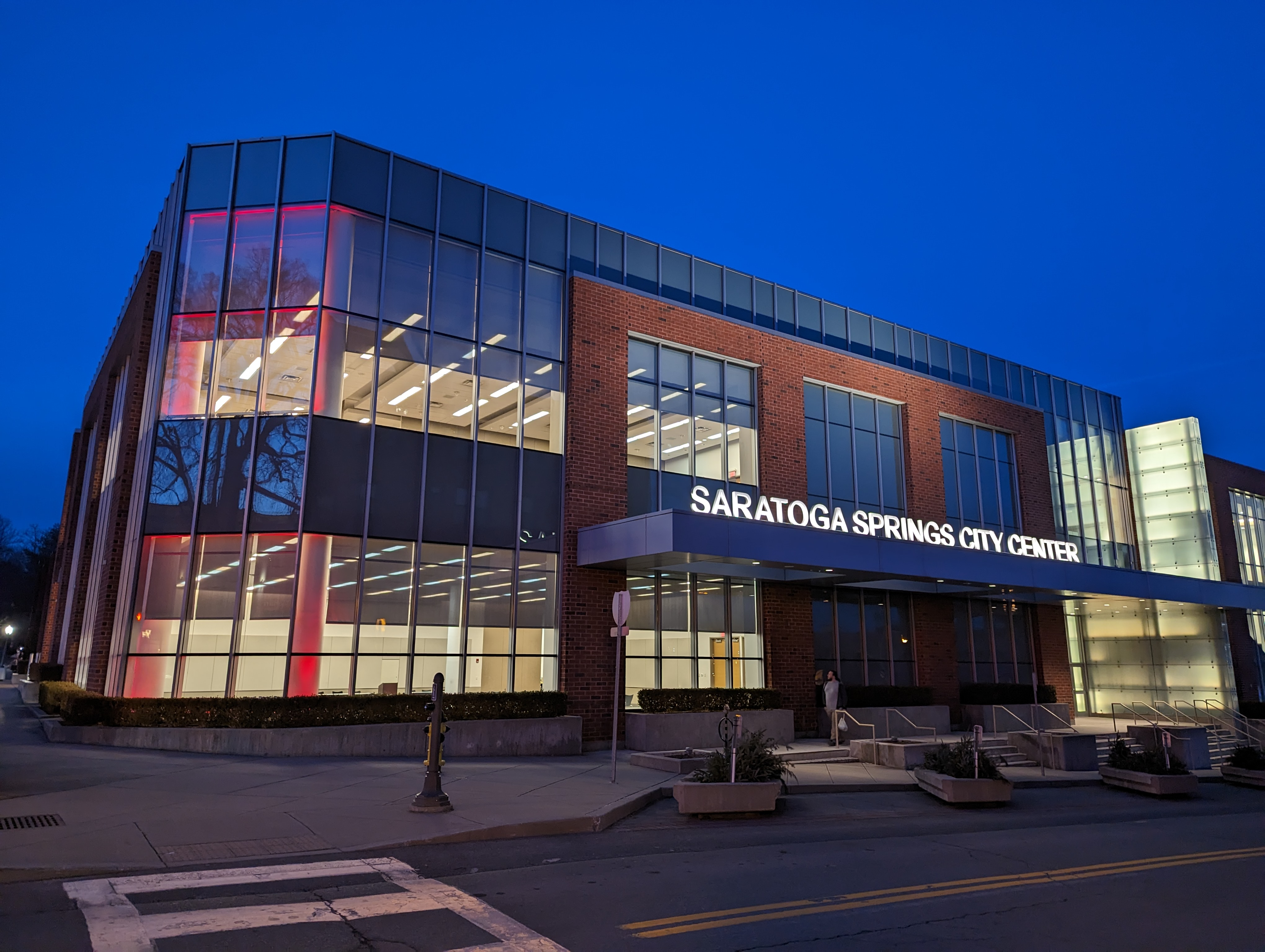
The Saratoga Springs City Center, the current venue for the festival

The festival was first held in 1988.

== Programming ==
Contra dancers at the 2019 festival

The festival includes a wide variety of traditional folk dance and music, as well as impromptu musical jam sessions, discussions, and craft sales. In recent years, it has featured more than 250 different sessions per year from Friday through Sunday of Presidents' Day weekend. The festival is best known for its large contra dances, which can feature up to approximately 500 dancers dancing simultaneously on a custom-built dance floor in a hotel ballroom. Other dance offerings include swing, Latin, English country, square, clogging, hip-hop, cajun, zydeco, Irish, Scandinavian, Middle Eastern, Asian, and yoga. The festival caters to all skill levels.

== See also ==
- The New England Folk Festival (NEFFA), a similar festival in Massachusetts
