= Contra dance choreography =

Sequence of moves in contra dance

This article supplements the main Contra dance article.

Contra dance choreography specifies the dance formation, the figures, and the sequence of those figures in a contra dance. The figures repeat, ideally, in a graceful flowing pattern, aligned with the phrasing of the music. Contra dance figures (with a few exceptions) do not have defined footwork; within the limits of the music and the comfort of their fellow dancers, individuals move to the beat and embellish according to their own taste. Much of the dance is done as a walking movement, one step for each count of the music, while the arms and hands do most of the changing, most of these involving connecting with others' hands.

Most contra dances consist of a sequence of about six to twelve individual figures, prompted by the caller in time to the music as the figures are danced. As the sequence repeats, the caller should be able to cut down his or her prompting, sometimes to a single word for every figure, and eventually stop calling, leaving the dancers to each other and the music.

== Fundamentals ==
A figure is a pattern of movement that typically takes eight counts, although figures with four or sixteen counts are also common. Each dance is a collection of figures assembled to allow the dancers to progress along the set.

A count is one half of a musical measure, such as one quarter note in 2/4 time or three eighth notes in 6/8 time. A count may also be called a step, as contra dance is a walking form, and each count of a dance typically matches a single physical step in a figure.

Typical contra dance choreography comprises four parts, each 16 counts (8 measures) long. The parts are called A1, A2, B1 and B2. This nomenclature stems from the music: Most contra dance tunes have two parts (A and B), each 8 measures long, and each fitting one part of the dance. The A and B parts are each played twice in a row, hence, A1, A2, B1, B2. While the same music is generally played in, for example, parts A1 and A2, distinct choreography is followed in those parts. Thus, a contra dance is typically 64 counts, and goes with a 32-measure tune.

In figures such as an allemande, rollaway or swing, dancers commonly give weight, leaning slightly away from their partner to create tension. This is necessary in some dances to perform the figures quickly enough, and is considered good dancing style.

Same-sex partners are increasingly common in contra dancing, either by preference or to accommodate different numbers of men and women attending; in the descriptions that follow, gentleman and lady refer to roles rather than sexes.

=== Starting a dance ===
Most contra dances are done in minor sets of two couples, as part of a line of dancers; the caller asks the dancers to organize themselves in these minor sets so they will know who they will initially be dancing with, and in which direction each couple will be moving in the course of the dance; this is generally stated as "Take hands four".

== Contra dance figures ==
Allemande
Two dancers join either right or left hands in a thumbs-up, palms-together grip and walk around each other.
Balance
A figure which takes four counts and is often performed with a partner before a swing, though it can also be done in circles or wavy lines. There are many variations in how a balance is executed, but most commonly it consists of stepping on the right foot and kicking the left, and then stepping on the left foot and kicking the right. Couples balancing may join either one or both hands, and the movement is sometimes accompanied by stomping on the beat.
Basket
Ladies join hands in the center. Gents join hands on the outside. Then the ladies raise their arms above and around the gents' heads. Then all circle left or right in this position.
Butterfly whirl
The gentleman and lady turn around, each while keeping hold of their partner's waist. Facing the same direction, with inside arms reaching across their partner's backs (or, less commonly, gentleman's arm behind lady's back, lady's hand on gentleman's shoulder—this often makes moving into the next figure easier), the lady walks forward in a circle and the gent backs up. This often leads into a figure with the ladies in the center, such as a ladies chain (see below). A common precursor to this figure is the following: gentlemen do a left hand allemande, then "scoop up" their partner by putting their arm around their lady's waist. Next the gents drop left hands and the two couples butterfly whirl back to place, facing each other.
Circle
Four people join hands and walk around in a circle, either clockwise (left) or counterclockwise (right). Circling can be 1/4 of a circle (rare), 1/2 (less rare), 3/4 (common), once around (common), or 1 1/4 (less common).
Clover-leaf
Starting from a Cozy Line, the center pair duck down while the outer pair pass their joined hands over the center pair, forming the clover-leaf.

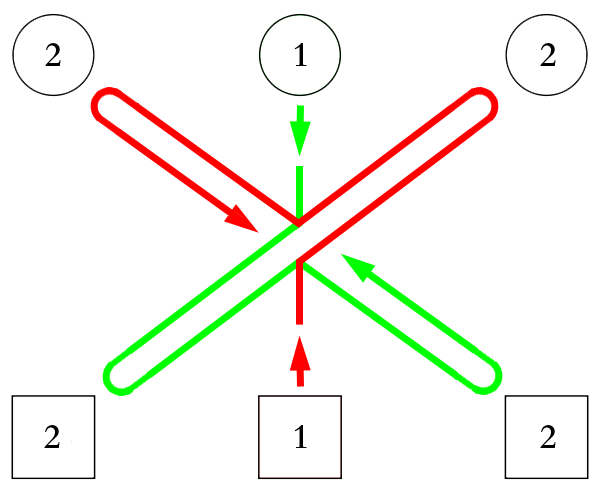
Contra corners (standard notation is squares for men and circles for women, 1s for actives and 2s for inactives)

Contra-Corners
A figure involving six dancers and taking 8 bars (16 beats) of music. The center couple of the group of six dancers is the active couple; the other four dancers are the corners. As each member of the active couple looks across the set to their partner, their first corner is to the right and second corner is to the left. Typically, one's corners are of the opposite role to oneself.
The figure is danced as follows: the active couple allemande right in the center until they reach their first corners. Actives drop right hands and allemande left with their first corners until they meet each other again. Actives now let go of first corners and allemande right until they reach their second corners. A final allemande left, with their second corners, is finished when the members of the active couple are facing each other again.
Because moves within this figure begin and end in the middle of musical phrases, require a great deal of awareness of positioning, and are frequently unprompted by the caller after the figure's start, this can be a very difficult figure for those who are new to it.
Courtesy turn
The gentleman takes the lady's left hand in his left hand, and puts his right hand behind her back to take her right hand (usually at the small of her back). The dancers are side by side as they turn around to face back across the set; the gentleman walks backward as the lady continues to walk forward.
Cozy Line (Turn Cozy)
In a line of four dancers, the center pair lift their joined hands and turn away from each other, while the outer pair, without letting go, turn in and join hands behind the center pair's backs.
Cross Trail
A pass through followed by the lady crossing in front of the gent to her left, turning 1/4 counterclockwise. The gent then turns 1/4 clockwise to the right. They end up facing directly away from each other; if they began on one side of the set facing across, they will end on the other side with one facing up the set and one down. Can be used to progress, if the lady is the neighbor of the gent in each pair doing the figure.
Dixie Twirl
In a line of four dancers, the center pair arches. The extreme right person leads through the arch (taking the one on their left along for the ride) while the left person walks to the right. This results in a line now facing the opposite direction.
Do-si-do
Two dancers begin by facing each other, then move in a clockwise fashion so as to first pass right shoulders ("pass by the right"), then slide back-to-back, then back up, passing left shoulders, to end where they began. Sometimes they do-si-do 1 1/2 times, exchanging places and ending back-to-back. As an embellishment, experienced dancers will often add a spin while performing this move.
Down the Hall Four in Line
Two couples join hands so that they form a line of four, and walk down the hall, or away from the music. Sometimes the two people in the center twirl those on the side, but this is optional.
Figure Eight
a weaving figure in which dancers pass between two standing people and move around them in a figure 8 pattern. A full figure of 8 returns the dancer to original position; a half figure of 8 leaves the dancer on the opposite side of the set from original position. In doing this figure, the gent lets his partner pass in front of him.
Give and Take
Facing across the set, all dancers step forward and join hands with the person across from them. One dancer then brings the other back to their own side. It is usually followed by a swing. Invented by Larry Jennings as a swing/swing connector.
Gypsy
Adapted from English country dancing, a pair of dancers look each other in the eyes and walk around each other without touching. In this way, the gypsy is somewhere between a do-si-do and a swing. The amount of eye contact depends on various factors including individual comfort and local tradition. Since some have identified the name as an ethnic slur, callers have been using a number of new terms for this, primarily right shoulder round.
Half Hey
Half a hey for four. Instead of crossing the set and returning, the dancers merely cross the set once, ending with the couples on the opposite sides of the set.

Hey For Four

Hey For Four
(Sometimes called a "straight hey for four.") The dancers execute a series of passes and turns with the other dancers in their minor set, crossing to the opposite side of the set and then returning. In this version of the hey, assume that neighbors are standing next to each other on the side of the set, facing their partners:
- The ladies begin passing right shoulders in the center of the set while the men sidle to right to take the recent position of their neighbor
- Partners pass left shoulders as the gents advance to the center
- The gents then pass right shoulders in the center, while the ladies make wide looping turns to the left on the sides to turn around
- Neighbors pass left shoulders
- This is approximately one-half of the hey. The second half essentially replicates the first half (except that the men, now facing out, loop to the left instead of sidling to the right). At the end of the hey, the dancers are restored to the starting position, with the exception that the men are facing out of the set.
The figure is executed smoothly, with all dancers moving all the time. All versions of a straight hey for four will follow this track, but dancers will sometimes start in different positions (e.g., partners facing one another across the set, or with the gent on the right and the lady on the left), or the first person to move may be the person on the left, in which case the track is reversed.
Experienced dancers often embellish by spinning and sometimes twirling the other dancers as they move through this figure.
Ladies Chain
The ladies join right hands in the center and pull past each other to the opposite gent; the gents then give the ladies a courtesy turn. This causes the ladies to trade sides in the set. Historically, a ladies chain described this sequence of moves being done twice, so that all the dancers returned to their starting position; a modern ladies chain was called a "half-ladies chain". Some more recently composed dances include a gents chain.
Long Lines Forward & Back
All dancers face toward the dancers across the set from them, and join hands with the dancers beside them to form "long lines" on the sides of the set. These two lines then, in unison, take four steps forward and then four steps backward.
Mad Robin (Sashay Round)
Two dancers move around one another as in a do-si-do. Instead of beginning by facing one another, both dancers face in the same direction.
Pass Through
Two facing dancers walk across (or along) the set, passing each other by the right shoulder, without touching. Even though the dancers may be in side-by-side couples, they act as individuals when passing through. This move frequently follows either a circle or a neighbor do-si-do. A pass through along the set is often used to progress, as one couple will move down the hall while the other will move up.
Petronella Turn
Four dancers, equally spaced around a small ring, move into the position of the dancer on their right in four steps while rotating (spinning) individually clockwise 3/4. This movement is adapted from the eponymous dance "Petronella," a traditional contra dance derived from a Scottish country dance of the same name. Some dancers clap twice on beats 3.5 and 4 of the 4-beat movement.
Promenade
Facing in the same direction, shoulder to shoulder with the lady on the right, a couple walks where the caller directs. There are several different handholds:
- Courtesy turn position – (see Courtesy Turn above).
- Skater's promenade – as in the courtesy turn, the couple join left hands in front; rather than joining right hands behind the lady's back, right hands are joined in front above the left hands. In an uncommon variation, right hands are joined below left hands.
- Varsouvienne position – In this position, the gent is slightly behind the lady, with their joined left hands in front of her left shoulder, and their joined right hands above her right shoulder.

The gent may choose to spin the lady under his arm at the end as a flourish; in some areas this spin is practically a rule, while in others it is unheard of. As with twirls, flourishes can add some fun, but can also slow things down and affect the timing of the dance. Promenades are frequently used to move a couple to the opposite side of the set, or to bring dancers back to place (useful when dancers get lost mid-dance).

Pull by
Two dancers, facing each other, take hands and pull past one another, trading places. Can be done with either right or left hands, and either across or along the set.
Right & Left Through
Both couples face each other across the set. They walk toward each other, passing through in the center such that the ladies pass left shoulders with each other and right shoulders with the opposite gent. The gents then give the ladies a courtesy turn (see above). The effect is that the couples trade sides of the set. The older tradition, still prominent in some regions, begins the figure with a right-handed pull by rather than the dancers walking past one another (followed by the left-in-left of the courtesy turn, hence the term "right & left through").
Right Hand High, Left Hand Low
This figure begins with three dancers holding hands in a line. The middle dancer raises his/her right hand; the dancer on the left walks under the raised hand, followed by the middle dancer, while the dancer on the right walks behind. The effect is to turn the line around as a unit (preserving the order of the dancers), as a sort of three-person California Twirl.
Roll away with a half sashay
Two dancers facing in the same direction, holding hands. One dancer spins (the roll away) with a full turn (360°) towards and in front of the other dancer, who sidesteps (the half sashay) behind to exchange places. At the end of the figure, the dancers have changed places but are still facing in the same direction as initially. (Most commonly, this figure starts with the lady on the gent's left and the lady passes in front of the gent). Giving weight is of key importance in this figure.
Sashay
Partners face each other and hold both hands. They then move sideways moving their feet out in the direction they want to go, and then together to prepare for the next step.
See Saw (left shoulder do-si-do)
Instead of starting the do-si-do with the right shoulder, the dancer starts with the left shoulder. (Two dancers begin facing each other, move so as to pass left shoulders, then back-to-back, then right shoulders, ending where they began. As an embellishment, experienced dancers will often add a spin to this move, as in a do-si-do.)
Slide
Starting in a wavy line, dancers let go of one anothers' hands and simultaneously step right or left one place. A common embellishment is for dancers to spin, clockwise if sliding right and counterclockwise if sliding left, rather than simply stepping.
Star
The four dancers in a minor set all join either right or left hands in the center of the set and walk around the set. A star usually turns one full-time around; less commonly stars will turn 3/4 or 1 1/4 turns. There are two styles of stars, and which style of star is used generally depends upon local custom, although there are some dances that require one or the other:
- New England style, sometimes called wrist-grip stars or wagon-wheel stars: Each dancer places his or her hand on the wrist of the person in front of them as they face around the circle, forming a 'wagon-wheel' shape. One of the few figures in which it's important not to give weight, as it's uncomfortable for the other dancer.
- Southern style, sometimes called handshake-grip stars, English-style, or hands-across stars: Each dancer joins hands with the person directly across the set (usually the person of the same gender). It generally does not matter whose hands are on top or bottom (ladies' or gents').
Swing
Most commonly the couple takes a modified ballroom position, with the lady's left hand on the gent's shoulder, the gent's right hand on the lady's left shoulder blade, and their free hands clasped together in the air (though many variant positions are possible). One can either walk or use a buzz-step; one partner may walk while the other uses the buzz-step. For the buzz-step, the right foot takes only small steps, with the partner's right foot to the right of it. The left foot pushes against the ground repeatedly, moving the dancer in a circle clockwise. Weight is very important in this figure. A swing usually ends facing across the set, sometimes down the set, rarely up the set, with the gent to the left and the lady to his right.
Swinging star
Two couples make a right hand star, take left hands across, and move clockwise with a buzz step.
Turn alone
Each person turns around in place. It is polite for dancers to turn towards the person they are currently interacting with (this may not be their partner: when in the center of a line of four it is polite to turn towards the person on the end). This often follows "Down the Hall Four in Line".
Turn as a couple
In this figure a couple with hands joined turns around in such a way that the ladies remain on the same side of their gent, normally the right hand side. The California Twirl is commonly used to turn as a couple.
Twirl to Swap
This is a generic term for a number of dance moves which begin with a couple holding hands. They raise their joined hands, and the lady walks under them while the gent passes behind her, to trade places. There are a number of variants of this, depending on facing and on which hand is joined:
- California twirl – The lady begins on the gent's right facing in some particular direction; they have the convenient hand joined. The figure ends with them both facing in the opposite direction from their original one.
- Star through – The couple begins facing each other, with the gent's right hand and the lady's left hand joined. If the figure begins with the gent facing north and the lady south, then both will be facing east when the figure ends (with the lady on the gent's right).
- Box the gnat – The couple begins facing each other, with right hands joined. They end facing each other.
- Swat the flea – The couple begins facing each other, with left hands joined. They end facing each other.
