= New England Folk Festival =

Annual American music and dance festival

- The New England Folk Festival is organized by the New England Folk Festival Association.
- Frequency: Annually
- Website: neffa.org/festival-home

The New England Folk Festival is an annual weekend festival of traditional dance and music. It takes place in the Boston, Massachusetts region each spring. It is conducted by the New England Folk Festival Association. Both the festival and the association are colloquially known by the abbreviation NEFFA. NEFFA is a participatory festival; attendees are encouraged to participate in dancing, singing, musical jam sessions, and other activities. It is run by volunteers and all the performers are volunteers as well.

The festival and the association has introduced thousands of New England and Massachusetts residents to the varied communities of traditional social and folk dance and folk music for more than 60 years, especially celebrating the living traditions of folk music and dance traditional to New England. Numerous New England folk dance callers, leaders and musicians have had formative experiences at the festival, and in turn have inspired and influenced thousands more through their performances, workshops, and enthusiastic participation. The festival has been influential in sustaining and reviving numerous folk dance traditions in New England.

As a social dance festival, it is a community experience, the largest in New England of its kind, with about 5,000 combined admissions in the festival's four session periods. It is the inspiration for other similar traditional dance and music festivals throughout the United States and North America. For contra dance and folk dance leaders from New England and the United States, the festival has been an annual opportunity to perform, share experiences, insights, and further living traditions. The association also conducts a weekly contra dance series in Concord, Massachusetts.

== History ==
The idea for NEFFA came about in the summer of 1944, in a discussion over coffee after a square dance at the Boston YWCA. The participants were Grace Palmer, director of the YWCA; Mary Gillette, head of the YWCA's physical education program; and Ralph Page, the popular New Hampshire caller who presided at the square dances. The series had been running for little more than a year, but was already drawing over two hundred people every week, most of them college students. As Ralph Page later recalled the conversation, they were discussing a recent attempt at a "New England Folk Festival" at the Boston Garden which had left them unimpressed: "Mary said: 'Why don't we have a real folk festival?' and so the idea was born". Mary Gillette envisioned a festival where New England's many ethnic groups could share their song, dances, and crafts and present them to a wider audience, in a simple, honest, straightforward manner.

Grace Palmer offered the facilities of the Boston YWCA. Philip Sharples, who in 1940 had founded the Belmont Country Dance Group (one of the first square and contra dance series in the Boston area), joined with Mary Gillette and Ralph Page in calling local leaders to meet and talk it over. Many recreation agencies and ethnic groups sent representatives. From the start, the Festival Committee agreed to maintain an atmosphere of non-commercialism and high standards of performance and authenticity. The first festival took place on 28–29 October 1944 and attracted 200 attendees, mainly to watch performances of local ethnic dance performing groups.

The festival continued at the Boston YWCA five more times. From 1951 onward, it was held in a variety of town and cities near Boston, visiting Worcester several times, and once each in Exeter, New Hampshire, Manchester, New Hampshire, North Kingston, Rhode Island, Brockton, Massachusetts and Lowell, Massachusetts. It was held in Natick High School from 1967 to 1970, then returned to Natick in 1974 and remained there through 2006. From 2007 to 2019 the festival was held at Mansfield High and Middle Schools. Since 2023, the festival has been held at Best Western Hotel and Trade Center in Marlborough. Over the course of 60-plus years, the festival has grown to a three-day affair, with about 5,000 admissions.

The NEFFA festival was founded in 1944, long before several more famous folk festivals, such as the Philadelphia Folk Festival (1962) and the Newport Folk Festival (1959). In recent decades, NEFFA has been influential as a model for dance and music festivals in New England, and nationally, including upstate New York's Flurry Festival (founded 1988) and Maine's Down East Country Festival (founded 1991).

Due to the COVID-19 pandemic, the 2020, 2021 and 2022 festivals were held virtually. The festival has again been held in person beginning in 2023.

== The festival program and performers ==
In recent years, participatory dancing occurs simultaneously in three halls, most prominently contra dance, international folk dance, and English country dance, in addition to other genres of dance. A variety of concerts, discussions and other more intimate performances take place in numerous class room spaces. Family-oriented events occur during daylight hours on Saturday and Sunday. A courtyard outside is devoted to Morris dancing, Rapper Sword and Longsword dancing. Sunday afternoons typically schedule dance and music demonstrations of a variety of ethnic dances, by local and distant dance groups, in the main hall. The hundreds of volunteer musicians, singers, dance callers, leaders and dance-demonstration performers are primarily from New England and every year a number arrive from more distant parts of North America. The performers apply in the fall, and the program is announced in the spring.

== The NEFFA association ==
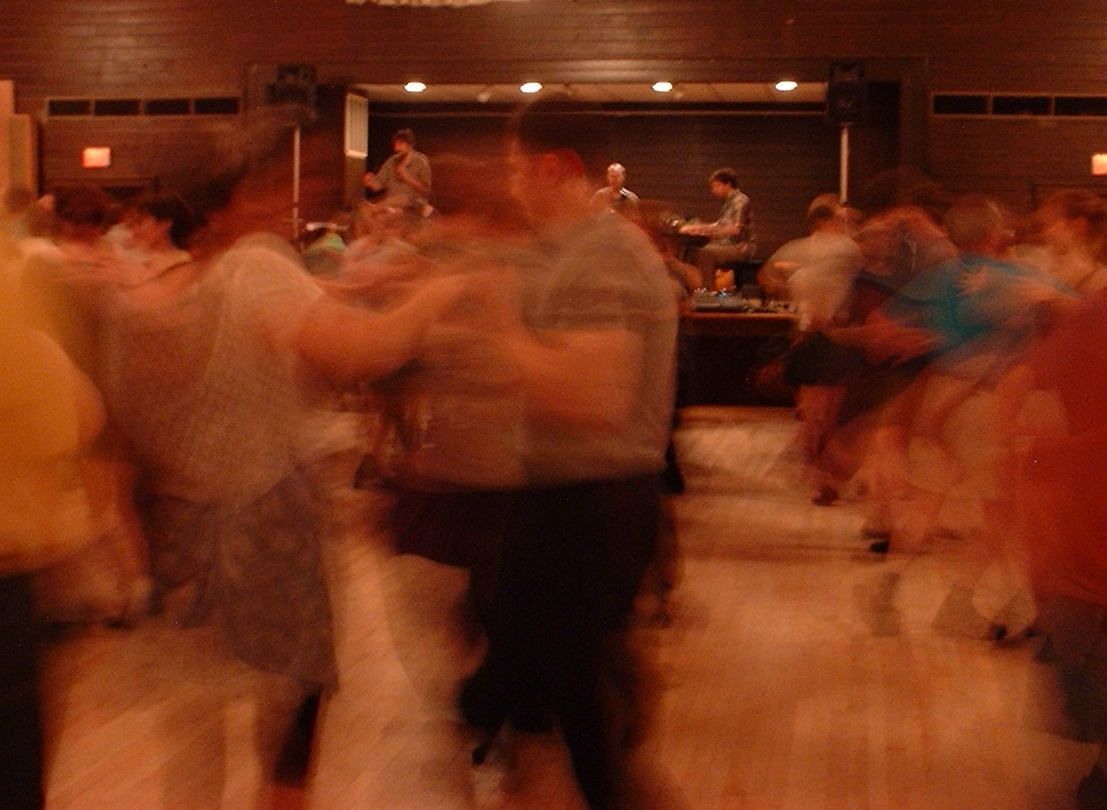
A NEFFA Thursday night contra dance at the Fresh Pond VFW in Cambridge, Massachusetts, in May 2003, (before the dance moved to Concord)

In addition to the annual spring festival, NEFFA conducts the weekly Thursday Night Contra dance, formerly in Cambridge and as of 2006, held at the Concord Scout House. The dance is nationally known in the contra dance community for its vibrancy and popularity. NEFFA also conducts a separate annual winter festival called the Ralph Page Dance Legacy Weekend, in honor of one of the organization's founders, to promote understanding of the history and development of traditional Anglo-American dance forms in New England, especially contra dance and square dance. NEFFA has also published influential books about traditional dance and choreography. NEFFA is an affiliate of the Country Dance and Song Society.

== See also ==
- Flurry Festival, a similar festival held in upstate New York
- Social dance
- Contra dance
- Folk dance
- International folk dance
- Folk music
- Shape note
- Zwiefacher
