= Ralph Page =

American contra dance caller (1903–1985)

- Ralph Page, c. 1940s

Background information
- Born: January 28, 1903; Munsonville, New Hampshire
- Died: February 21, 1985 (aged 82) Keene, New Hampshire
- Genres: Dance
- Occupation: caller

Ralph George Page (January 28, 1903 – February 21, 1985) was an American contra dance caller. He was influential in spreading it from New Hampshire to the rest of the United States and other countries, and was recognized as an authority on American folk dance overall.

== Life and career ==
Page was born on January 28, 1903, in Munsonville, New Hampshire. He grew up in Nelson, New Hampshire, where his Scottish-Irish American family had lived for several generations as farmers. In 1934, he was elected selectman for Nelson by a five-vote margin over a more conservative incumbent, Harry Green.

Page began calling (prompting) contra dances in 1930 accidentally, when he was scheduled to play for a dance in Stoddard but the caller developed laryngitis. He took five days off per year from his work. Every Tuesday, he travelled to the Clarendon Street YMCA in Boston to call contra and square dances. In 1944, Page was one of three founders of the New England Folk Festival Association. He was its president for several years. Beginning in the 1950s, Page led folk dance camps across the United States. In 1956, the U.S. State Department sponsored Page to tour Japan. During this trip, he called a dance for more than 4,000 people in a Tokyo stadium; he used hand signals, as he did not speak Japanese. In 1966, Page toured England and led workshops with the English Folk Dance and Song Society.

Page opposed the modern western square dance movement, and criticized its complexity in his writings.

Page died at age 82 on February 21, 1985, at the Cheshire County Hospital. He is buried in the Munsonville Cemetery.

== Personal life ==
Page married Ada Novak in 1945. He had one daughter, Laura Susan Wilson, born 1946. He lived in Keene.

Page was a bibliophile. He especially enjoyed history and mystery novels, and wrote an unpublished mystery novel himself. Page never learned to drive, instead commuting by train or bus. Page was active in local politics. He served as the president of the Cheshire County Historical Society for 15 years and as a selectman for Nelson from 1934 to 1938.

== Recognition and legacy ==
As an early American contra dance caller, Page is credited with sustaining and spreading the tradition, keeping it alive until the 1960s, when it experienced a revival due to the countercultural revolution. In 1977, Page received the Granite State Award. In 1980, he was given Callerlab's Milestone Award.

Page's papers are held in a collection at the University of New Hampshire library.

The Ralph Page Dance Legacy Weekend, begun in 1988 and held annually in January at UNH, is named in his honor.

== Publications ==
Page published Northern Junket magazine from 1949 to 1984. It contained calling instructions, folk tunes, and other folk culture, and an editorial. His other works include:

- With Tolman, Beth (1937). The Country Dance Book: The Old-Fashioned Square Dance, Its History, Lore, Variations and Its Callers. Literary Licensing, LLC. ISBN 978-1-4940-3855-7.
- The Ralph Page Book of Contras. London: English Folk Dance and Song Society. 1969. ISBN 0-85418-003-6. OCLC 810699.
- Heritage Dances of Early America. Colorado Springs, Colorado: Lloyd Shaw Foundation. 1976. OCLC 959505293.
- An Elegant Collection of Contras and Squares. Denver, Colorado: Lloyd Shaw Foundation. 1984. ISBN 0-915213-00-1. OCLC 10913290.
- Knox, Ralph C., ed. (1990). Contras as Ralph Page Called Them. OCLC 22742269.

== See also ==
- Dudley Laufman, later 20th-century contra dance caller
