= Contra dance form =

Arrangement of contra dancers into sets

Contra dance form describes the arrangement of dancers into contra dance sets and minor sets. There are various forms, and each dance's choreography specifies its formation. A caller's first instructions for each dance are usually to move the dancers into their starting positions according to the choreography for that dance.

== Formations ==
=== Standard ===
Contra dances are arranged in long paired lines of couples. A pair of lines is called a set. Sets are generally arranged so they run the length of the hall, with the top or head of the set being the end closest to the band and caller. Correspondingly, the bottom or foot of the set is the end furthest from the caller.

Couples consist of two people, traditionally but not necessarily one male and one female, referred to as the gent or gentleman and lady.

Couples interact primarily with an adjacent couple for each round of the dance. Each sub-group of two interacting couples is known to choreographers as a minor set and to dancers as a foursome. (Not all dances are done in two-couple minor sets - see "Formations, Less common," below.) Couples in the same minor set are neighbors. Minor sets originate at the head of the set, starting with the topmost dancers as the 1s (the active couple or actives); the other couple are 2s (or inactives). The 1s are said to be above their neighboring 2s; 2s are below. If there is an uneven number of couples dancing, the bottom-most couple will wait out the first time through the dance (see "Progression," below).

There are three common ways of arranging dancers in the minor sets: proper formation, improper formation, and Becket formation (see illustrations below). All three are duple minor — based on two-couple minor sets (see triple minor formation below).

- In proper dances all the gents are in one line, and all the ladies are in the other; dancers are across (on opposite sides of) the set from their partners.
- In improper dances the 1s cross over, switching places with their partners. The result is "lady-gent-lady-gent" lines.
- Becket dances are essentially improper dances in which each minor set has been rotated ¼ turn clockwise - lines are "gent-lady-gent-lady", with dancers standing on the same side of the set as their partners and across from their neighbors. Becket formation was introduced to contra dance in the 1950s by the caller Herbie Gaudreau, and is named after his dance the "Becket Reel", or the town of Becket, Massachusetts, where he taught.

Common set layouts (all are duple minor)

Proper

L1 L2 L1 L2 L1 L2 L1 L2...
G1 G2 G1 G2 G1 G2 G1 G2...

Improper

G1 L2 G1 L2 G1 L2 G1 L2...
L1 G2 L1 G2 L1 G2 L1 G2...

Becket

L1 G1 L1 G1 L1 G1 L1 G1...
G2 L2 G2 L2 G2 L2 G2 L2...

Key: band is to the left; L=lady, G=gent, 1s=ones (active couple), 2s=twos (inactive couple)

Note: As there is no limit on set length for these dances (other than the number of people the venue will accommodate), the "..." can represent any number of couples, though in certain dances, 5-6 couples are allowed at most.

Traditional dance choreography left the actives doing much more than the inactives. Modern choreographers typically want everyone to be active, so the roles have been renamed "1" and "2". At the same time, improper and Becket dances have become more common than proper ones as choreographers and dancers have come to desire greater neighbor interaction.

=== Less common ===
There are many additional forms a contra dance may take. Five of them are: triple minor, triplet, indecent, four-face-four (all illustrated below), and whole-set.

- In whole-set dances, such as the Virginia Reel, only the head couple is active. After once through the dance, this couple is left at the foot of the set. Whole-set dances are now most commonly used with groups that are largely composed of beginners, such as children, occasional community dances, and wedding receptions.
- Triple minor dances, or triples, are based on sixsomes or three-couple minor sets (see the duple minor form above). While triple minors are common in English country dance, triple minor contra dances are rare. In triple minors and triplets, the first couple are called actives and both the second and third couples are inactives.
- Four-face-four contra dances (sometimes called Mescolanza or Portland Fancy dances after the traditional dance of this form) can be formed by placing two duple-improper sets next to each other. Each couple has a "shadow couple" with whom they are working for the entire dance — the minor sets consist of eight people. These are sometimes referred to as "squantras" or "contrares" because they borrow eight person figures from square dancing.
- Triplets, which are "triple major" dances — the entire (major) set is three couples — are also rare. The triplet form is an adaption by Ted Sannella of the traditional English country dance triplet, using modern contra dance tempo and moves; he composed a first triplet in 1968 and more than 41 of his triplets have been published. In his lifetime they were more commonly seen, though they have been composed and called by a number of choreographers up through the present day.
- Indecent dances are duple-minor contras in which the twos cross over, as opposed to the ones in an improper dance.
- Tempest formation is adapted from the English Country Dance of the same name. A line of two couples (progressing down) faces down in the center, and in front of them on each side are two couples facing across, and progressing up. The whole formation forms a flat U-shape if viewed from above.

Less common set layouts

Proper Triple Minor

L1 L2 L3 L1 L2 L3 L1 L2 L3...
G1 G2 G3 G1 G2 G3 G1 G2 G3...

Improper Triple Minor

G1 L2 L3 G1 L2 L3 G1 L2 L3...
L1 G2 G3 L1 G2 G3 L1 G2 G3...

Proper Triplet

L1 L2 L3.
G1 G2 G3.

Improper Triplet

G1 L2 L3.
L1 G2 G3.

Indecent (duple minor)

L1 G2 L1 G2 L1 G2 L1 G2...
G1 L2 G1 L2 G1 L2 G1 L2...

Four-face-four

G1 L2 G1 L2 G1 L2 G1 L2...
L1 G2 L1 G2 L1 G2 L1 G2...
G1 L2 G1 L2 G1 L2 G1 L2...
L1 G2 L1 G2 L1 G2 L1 G2...

Tempest

  L1 G1   L1 G1  ...
G2       G2      ...
L2       L2      ...
G3       G3      ...
L3       L3      ...
   G4 L4   G4 L4 ...

Key: Band is to the left; L=lady, G=gent, 1s=ones, 2s=twos, 3s=threes.

Note: As there is no limit on set length for triples or indecent dances (other than the number of people the venue will accommodate), the "..." can represent any number of couples, though in certain dances, 5-6 couples are allowed at most.

== Progression ==
=== In standard formations ===
A fundamental aspect of contra dancing is that the same dance, one time through which lasts roughly 30 seconds, is repeated over and over - but each time you dance with new neighbors. This change is effected by progressing the 1s down the set and the progressing 2s up (also up the hall and down the hall; see illustrations, below). In non-Becket dances this is done by moving the 1s to the bottom of their minor set and moving the 2s to the top of it: the 1s now have a different pair of 2s below them. In Becket dances, 1s progress by moving to the place formerly occupied by the 1s below them; similarly, 2s move to the place formerly occupied by the 2s above. (see "Formations", above, for definitions of terminology)

A dance will typically run at least long enough for every couple to dance with every other couple both as a 1 and a 2 (though extremely long sets may require shorter dances).

Progression in common set layouts

Proper progression

L1L2 L3L4...  -->  L2 L1L4 L3L6...  --> etc
G1G2 G3G4...  -->  G2 G1G4 G3G6...  --> etc

Improper progression

G1L2 G3L4...  -->  L2 G1L4 G3L6...  --> etc
L1G2 L3G4...  -->  G2 L1G4 L3G6...  --> etc

Becket progression

L1G1 L3G3...  -->       L1G1 L3G3...  --> etc
G2L2 G4L4...  -->  G2L2 G4L4 G6L6...  --> etc

Key: musicians and caller are to the left; the first time through the dance is depicted on the left, and each successive time through is to the right preceded by an arrow; odd-numbered couples are 1s, even-numbered couples are 2's; couples in the same minor set are not separated by spaces.

Notes:

- In practice, all couples are evenly spaced; the groupings are just to clarify relations.
- As there is no limit on set length for these dances (other than the number of people the venue will accommodate), the "..." can represent any number of couples.
- A clockwise Becket progression is illustrated. The entire set can be conceived of as a squashed circle. Many Becket dances progress counterclockwise.

Progression leaves a pair of 2s out at the head with no 1s above them to dance with; if there is an even number of couples in the set, a pair of 1s is also left out at the foot. This is not a problem: the couple waits out one time through the dance and then comes back in, now heading in the opposite direction. A couple re-entering at the head of the set (formerly 2s) re-enter as 1s, and vice versa.

Note that

- in improper dances partners must trade places while waiting out (in the illustration above, G2 and L2 are switched with respect to where G1 and L1 where before progression)
- individual Becket dances have their own ways of moving couples into progressed position, and couples waiting out must take this into account when choosing how to place themselves;
- "waiting" out does not necessarily mean being uninvolved: many modern dances include figures which use the waiting dancers for a moment and then return them to where they were.

=== In less common formations ===
Progression looks a little different in triple minor dances and triplets (see illustrations, below; "Formations, Less common," above, for definitions of these dance types).

Triple minors look complicated on paper. Features of the progression in a triple minor dance:

- 1s move down one place each time through the dance, as usual;
- as the other couples (2's and 3's) progress upward one place at time, they change roles each time through the dance: 2s become 3s become 2s become 3s (e.g. couple #5 in the illustration);
- when out at the top, dancers wait until they have a full sixsome.
- when out at the foot, dancers wait until they have a foursome, and then dance with an imaginary third couple - if they don't, the bottom couple will never re-enter the dance.

Triplets, on the other hand, are very simple: The roles of 1s, 2s, and 3s are reassigned each time through the dance, so that at the start of each time through the dance the head couple is the 1s. Progression may move the 1s to the foot of the set or the 3s to the head of the set, or may differ for the ladies and gents.

Four-face-fours progress as standard duple improper contra lines, except that in many dances each couple exchanges places with its shadow couple every time through the dance.

Progression in less common set layouts

Proper Triple Minor progression

L1L2L3 L4L5L6..........LXLYLZ  -->
G1G2G3 G4G5G6..........GXGYGZ  -->

L2 L1L3L5 L4L6L8...LULWLY LXLZ  -->
G2 G1G3G5 G4G6G8...GUGWGY GXGZ  -->

L2 L3 L1L5L6..........LULZLZ LX  -->
G2 G3 G1G5G6..........GUGZGZ GX  -->

L2L3L5...................LULZLX  -->  etc
G2G3G5...................GUGZGX  -->  etc

Proper Triplet progression

L1L2L3.  -->  L2L3L1.  -->  L3L1L2.  -->  etc.
G1G2G3.  -->  G2G3G1.  -->  G3G1G2.  -->  etc.

or

L1L2L3. --> L3L1L2. --> L2L3L1. --> etc.
G1G2G3. --> G3G1G2. --> G2G3G1. --> etc.

or

L1L2L3. --> L3L1L2. --> L2L3L1. --> etc.
G1G2G3. --> G2G3G1. --> G3G1G2. --> etc.

Four-face-four progression

 
G1 L3   G5 L7   G9 L11 ... -->
L1 G3   L5 G7   L9 G11 ... -->
G2 L4   G6 L8   G10L12 ... -->
L2 G4   L6 G8   L10G12 ... -->

L4   G2 L8   G6 L12  G10 ... -->
G4   L2 G8   L6 G12  L10 ... -->
L3   G1 L7   G5 L11  G9  ... -->
G3   L1 G7   L5 G11  L9  ... -->

G4 L7   G1 L11  G5 L10 ... etc.
L4 G7   L1 G11  L5 G10 ... etc.
G3 L8   G2 L12  G6 L9  ... etc.
L3 G8   L2 G12  L6 G9  ... etc.

Key: band is to the left; for the triple and four-face-four, the first time through the dance is depicted at the top and the second time through is below it (and the third below that, etc), while for the triplet the first time in depicted on the left, the second to the right of that, etc; couples 1 and 4 are 1s, 2 and 5 are 2s, 3 and 6 are 3s.

Notes:

- Improper triple minor and improper triplet progression, differing from their proper counterparts only in the 1s being crossed over, are not depicted.
- As there is no limit on set length for triples (other than the number of people the venue will accommodate), the "..." can represent any number of couples, though in certain dances, 5-6 couples are allowed at most.

== Variations ==
Gender-neutral dances (a modern, though still less common variation) define the traditional "gents" and "ladies" roles in a gender-free way, originally by having half of the dancers (those dancing the gents' role) wear an armband, though this has largely changed. After extensive discussion about which terms to use, many dances have settled on 'larks' and 'robins' (with larks ending the swing on the left and robins ending the swing on the right). Other communities use other terms, including 'bands/bare arms' (replacing 'gents' and ladies') 'leads and follows', and 'gems and rubies', or any number of other determiners. Gender-free dancing originally focused on "queer contra dances", focused on gay, lesbian, bisexual, transgender, and queer communities, and organized under the auspices of the Lavender Country and Folk Dancers. More recently, this terminology has been adopted by many mainstream contra dances, especially in the U.S. Northeast and West Coast.

Although some communities historically used armbands, ties, or other visual markers to signify of each role, they are now used less frequently, allowing dancers to switch roles during a dance: "Dance with who's comin' at ya" is the principle. See gender roles for a discussion of gender roles in square dancing.

An alternative movement within some contra dance communities emphasizes "positional calling", in which dancers are referred to by the positions ("lefts and rights") they occupy. This requires more care and effort by the dance caller, but attempts to sidestep controversies over the merits of tradition and inclusivity.
