= 1909 in British music =

This is a summary of 1909 in music in the United Kingdom.

== Events ==
- 14 January - Bon-Bon-Suite, a cantata by Samuel Coleridge-Taylor, is performed for the first time in its full orchestral version at the Brighton Festival.
- 22 February - The symphonic impression In the Fen Country by Ralph Vaughan Williams, composed in 1904, is performed for the first time at Queen's Hall in London by the newly formed Beecham Orchestra.
- 27 February - Claude Debussy conducts the first British performance of his three Nocturnes at Queen’s Hall. At the concert Debussy met Sibelius who was also visiting the UK.
- 3 March - Bruno Walter makes his London debut, conducting the Royal Philharmonic Society.
- 26 April - The opera Samson et Dalila by Camille Saint Saens is staged at Covent Garden in London, marking the lifting of a ban imposed on theatrical plays and operas portraying biblical characters is rescinded by the Lord Chancellor.
- 17 May - The first performance of Cyril Scott's Piano Sonata No 1, op 66, takes place at London’s Bechstein Hall, the composer performing.
- 7 June - The first complete performance of A Mass of Life by Frederick Delius takes place at Queen's Hall, conducted by Thomas Beecham.
- 22 June - The first staged performance of Ethel Smyth‘s opera The Wreckers takes place in London at His Majesty's Theatre.
- 13 July - Edward Elgar's Elegy for string orchestra has its premiere in London.
- 7 September -The Dance Rhapsody No. 1 by Delius has its premiere at the Hereford Music Festival.
- 22 September - The pianist Marie Novello makes her Proms début, playing the Piano Concerto no. 1 in E-flat by Franz Liszt.
- 15 November - On Wenlock Edge, a song cycle by Vaughan Williams setting six poems by A. E. Housman, is performed for the first time in London at the Aeolian Hall. The performers are tenor Gervase Elwes, pianist Frederick Kiddle and the Schwiller Quartet.
- date unknown - Ada Jones records her most popular song, "The Yama Yama Man", for the Victor Light Opera Company.

== Popular music ==
- "Boiled Beef and Carrots" by Charles Collins and Fred Murray
- "Master Kilby"; traditional folk song collected by Cecil Sharp and Maud Karpeles
- "The King's Way" by Edward Elgar and Caroline Alice Elgar

== New recordings ==
- Mark Sheridan - "I Do Like To be Beside the Seaside"

== Classical music: new works ==
- Arnold Bax – In the Faery Hills
- Gustav Holst – First Suite in E-flat for Military Band
- John Blackwood McEwen – A Solway Symphony
- Ralph Vaughan Williams – The Wasps

== Opera ==
- Fallen Fairies by W. S. Gilbert and Edward German
- The Mountaineers, by Guy Eden and Reginald Somerville
- Pierrot and Pierette, by Joseph Holbrooke

== Musical theatre ==
- 29 April – The Arcadians, with book by Mark Ambient and Alexander M. Thompson, lyrics by Arthur Wimperis, and music by Lionel Monckton and Howard Talbot, opens at the Shaftesbury Theatre in London, where it runs for 809 performances.

== Births ==
- 22 March - Minna Keal, composer (died 1999)
- 1 May – George Melachrino, conductor, singer and composer (died 1965)
- 11 May – Herbert Murrill, organist and composer (died 1952)
- 2 June - Robin Orr, Scottish organist and composer (died 2006)
- 12 June – Mansel Thomas, composer and conductor (died 1986)
- 13 August – Brian Lawrance, Australian-born bandleader (died 1983)
- 25 August – Brian Easdale, composer (died 1995)
- 25 August – Arwel Hughes, composer (died 1988)

== Deaths ==
- 4 February – James Lynam Molloy, poet, songwriter and composer, 71
- 18 May – August Jaeger, German-born British music publisher, friend of Elgar, 49
- 18 June - Learmont Drysdale, Scottish composer, 42
- 7 June – P. W. Halton, conductor, 68
- 5 December - Ebenezer Prout, composer, music theorist, author, 74

== See also ==
- 1909 in the United Kingdom
