= The Twa Brothers =

Traditional song

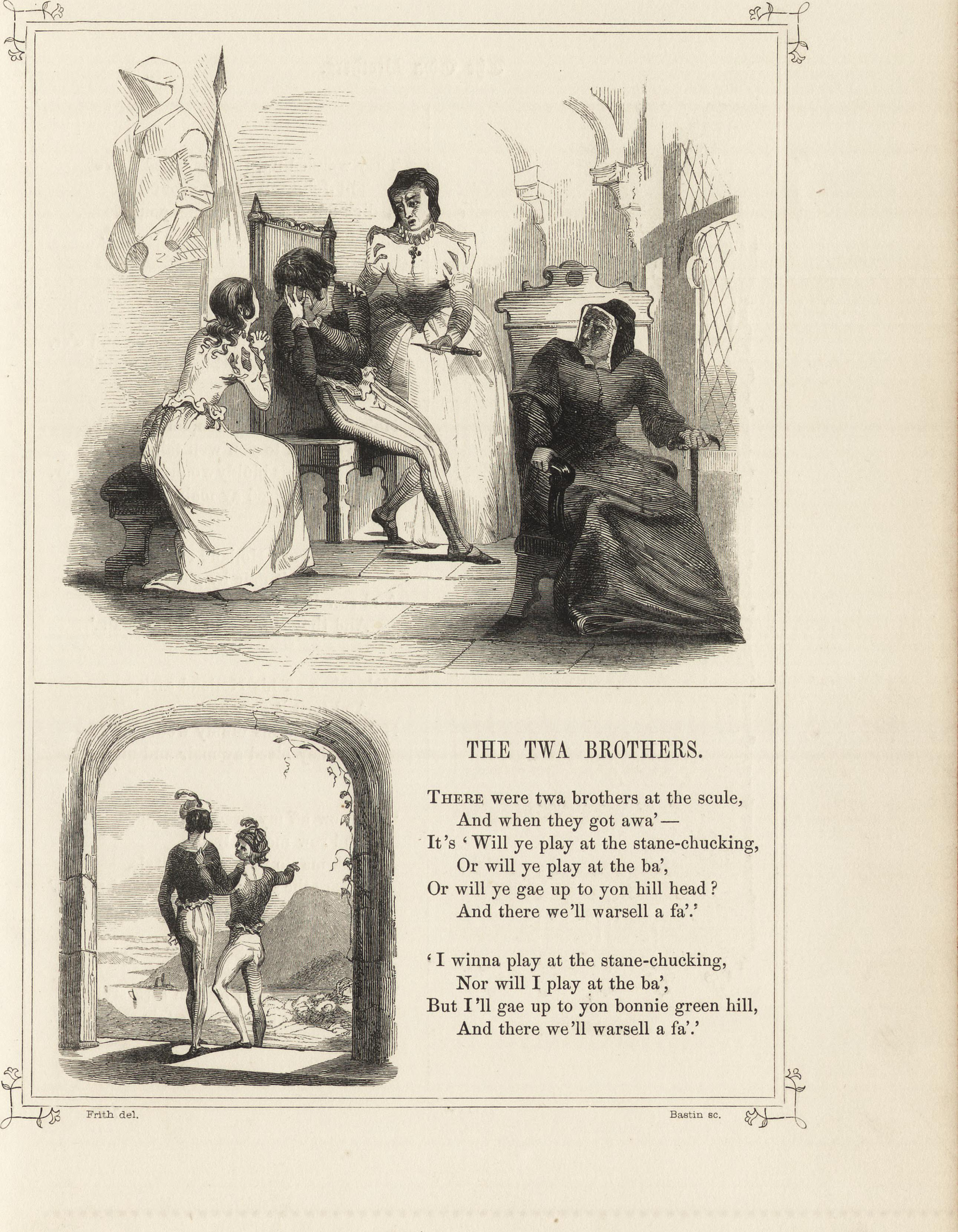
- The Twa Brothers from The Book of British Ballads (1842)

Song
- Genre: traditional ballad

"The Twa Brothers" is a traditional ballad (Roud 38, Child 49) existing in many variants.

== Synopsis ==
Two brothers are wrestling when a blade that one of them is carrying mortally wounds the other; occasionally, one of them stabs the other intentionally.

Attempts to staunch the blood are not successful, and the dying brother tells the living one (usually) how to bury him, and (always) a long list of excuses to give the rest of the family, about his traveling to distant locations, to avoid admitting his death, ending with the injunction to tell his true love the truth.

Some variants end there.

In others, the living brother is taxed with the blood—as in "Edward" and "Lizie Wan"—and attempts to tell false tales do not work. He usually leaves, never to return.

In still others, the true love laments him so long that it disturbs the dead man in his grave, or she wants a kiss from the dead man—as in "The Unquiet Grave" or some variants of "Sweet William's Ghost"—and he asks her to stop and let him rest, or refuses it because it will kill her. In the American variant "The Rolling of the Stones", she "charmed her true love out of his grave."

== Parallels ==
This ballad, in several variants, contains most of the ballad "Edward", Child 13.

== Traditional Recordings ==
Many traditional recordings of the ballad were made in Scotland in the twentieth century, mostly from members of two particular traveller families. Notable performers include Jeannie Robertson, her daughter Lizzie Higgins and nephew Stanley Robertson, as well as Belle Stewart (on the album O'er his grave the Grass Grew Green, 1988) and her daughter Sheila Stewart (on The Muckle Sangs, 1975). The unrelated Scottish singer Lucy Stewart sang a similar version which was recorded by Peter Kennedy in 1955 and later included on The Voice of the People (along with Belle Stewart's recording) and Good People take Warning (2012). Jeannie Robertson's recording is available on the Tobar an Dualchais website.

The majority of traditional recordings were made in the United States. Alan Lomax's recordings of Clay Walters (1937), Texas Gladden (1941) and her brother Hobart Smith (1942) are among several Appalachian recordings. Texas Gladden and Hobart Smith's recordings were eventually released on Texas Gladden, Ballad Legacy (2001) and Hobart Smith, Blue Ridge Legacy (2001) respectively. Many Ozark recordings were also made, such one performed by Evelyn Skaggs of Wayton, Arkansas (1954) and another by George Lay of Fayetteville, Arkansas which can be heard online courtesy of the Max Hunter Folk Collection. Helen Hartness Flanders also recorded several versions along the east coast.

== Popular Recordings ==
- sung by Ewan MacColl and Peggy Seeger on Two-Way Trip (1961)
- sung by Silly Wizard on Caledonia's Hardy Sons (1978)
- sung by Nic Jones on the 1971 album Nic Jones
- sung by Alasdair Roberts on the 2005 album No Earthly Man
- sung by Yorkston/Thorne/Khan on the 2020 album Navarasa: Nine Emotions
