= Babylon (ballad) =

Child ballad 14, Roud 27

"Babylon", also called "The Bonnie Banks o' Fordie" or "The Banks o' Airdrie" (Child 14, Roud 27) is an English-language folk song.

Mr. Motherwell gives a version under the title of Babylon; or, the Bonny Banks o' Fordie; and Mr. Kinloch gives another under the title of The Duke of Perth's Three Daughters. Previous editors have attempted to find a local habitation for this tradition, and have associated it with the family of Drummond, of Perth. As a legend exactly similar is current in Denmark, this appears a bootless quest.

— John S. Roberts (1887)

== Synopsis ==
An outlaw comes upon three sisters in the woods. He threatens each one in turn to make her marry him. The first two refuse and are killed. The third threatens him with her brother or brothers. He asks after them and discovers that he is the brother. He commits suicide.

== Parallels ==
Forms of this ballad are known throughout all of Scandinavia ("Töres döttrar i Wänge").

== Recordings ==
=== Traditional recordings ===
Betsy Miller of Scotland sang a traditional version of the song, presumably learnt from her Scottish family or community, with her famous son Ewan MacColl on the 1960 album A Garland Of Scots Folksong; only three other Scottish recordings were made. Helen Hartness Fladers recorded several traditional versions in the New England region of the United States, and Kenneth Peacock recorded two Canadian versions (1951 and 1960).

=== Popular recordings ===
Following are some of the notable recordings of the ballad, including the artists, titles, albums, and years:

Artist	Title	Album	Year
Dick Gaughan	"The Bonnie Banks o Fordie"	No More Forever	1972
Malinky	"The Bonnie Banks o Fordie: Pennknivsmördaren"	The Unseen Hours	2005
Nic Jones	"The Bonnie Banks of Fordie"	Landmarks (compilation)	2006
John Jacob Niles	"Bonnie Farday" (aka "Babylon")	My Precarious Life in the Public Domain	2006
Old Blind Dogs	"The Bonnie Banks o' Fordie"	New Tricks	1997
Alastair Roberts	"Babylon"	What News	2018

== In Art ==
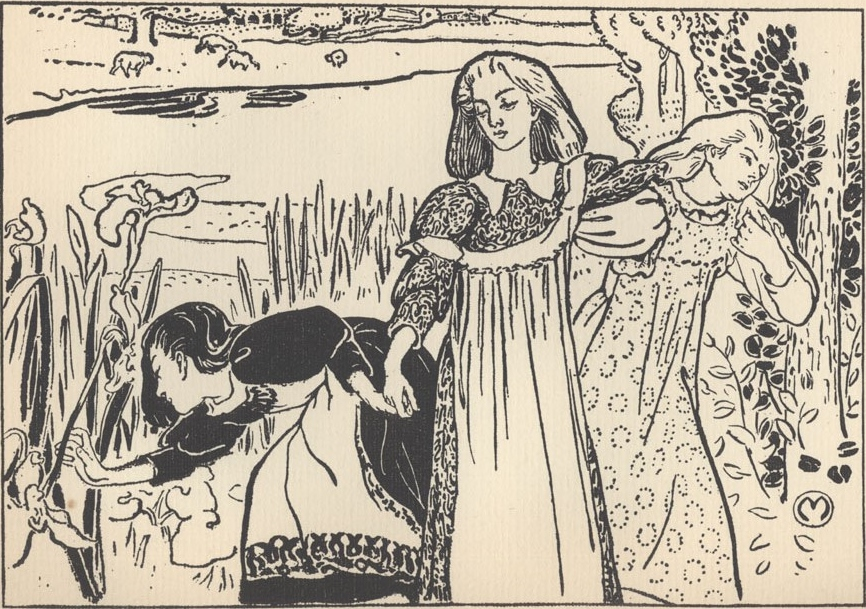
The Bonnie Banks o' Fordie, a woodblock illustration by Charles Hodge Mackie (1896)

The artist Charles Hodge Mackie contributed the woodblock illustration By the Bonnie Banks o' Fordie to The Evergreen: A Northern Seasonal, The Book of Winter, published by Patrick Geddes and Colleagues in 1896. He had painted an oil on board sketch of this subject while in France in the summer of 1894. The woodblock composition was subsequently worked up as an oil painting which was exhibited at the Royal Scottish Academy in 1897.

== See also ==
- List of the Child Ballads
- The King's Dochter Lady Jean
- The Bonny Hind
