= Ballade (classical music) =

One-movement instrumental piece

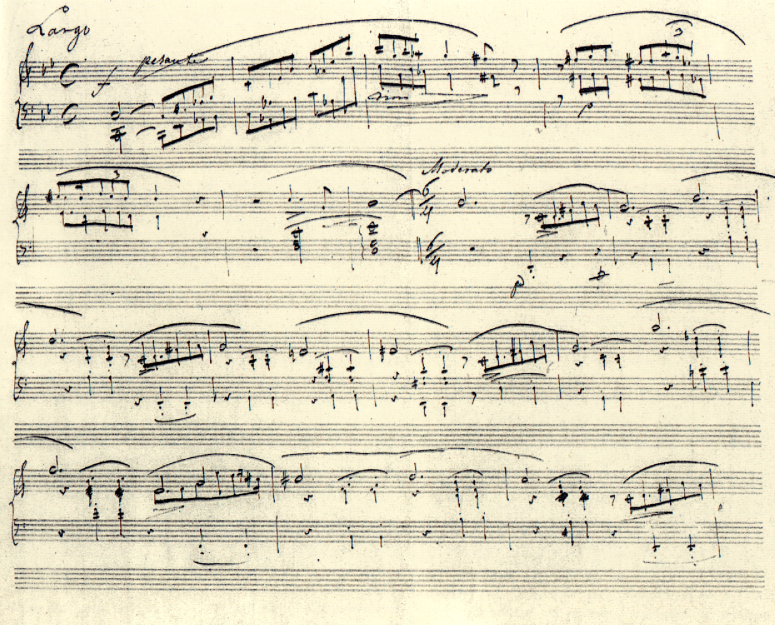
Ballade No. 1, by Frédéric Chopin

A ballade (/bəˈlɑːd/; French: [balad]; and Latin: ballare ,pronounced [bälˈlʲäːrɛ]) refers to a one-movement instrumental piece with lyrical and dramatic narrative qualities reminiscent of such a song setting. In 19th century romantic music, a piano ballade is a genre of solo piano pieces written in a balletic narrative style, with lyrical and virtuosic elements being prominently featured.

== Origin ==
The musical ballade originates in the literary tradition of medieval and early Renaissance poetry. In poetry, the ballade featured a highly structured form, typically composed of three main stanzas with a repeated refrain. This structure allowed poets to weave tales of romance, heroism, and folklore, with Guillaume de Machaut being a key figure in popularizing this poetic style. Additionally, the ballade existed as a courtly dance, marked by its elegance and association with nobility, reinforcing its connection to grand and noble themes.

As the literary ballade evolved, its narrative and lyrical qualities inspired composers to translate these elements into instrumental music. By the Romantic era, composers like Chopin began adapting the narrative essence of the ballade, creating expressive piano works that conveyed dramatic arcs and emotional depth without adhering to a strict poetic structure. These musical ballades embraced the storytelling spirit of their literary predecessors, allowing composers to explore narrative through melody and thematic development.

== Form ==
The 19th-century instrumental ballade emerged as a distinctive musical form that broke away from the traditional sonata and rondo structures. Rather than following traditional patterns of recapitulation, the ballade adopts a flexible and episodic approach. Composers such as Chopin frequently centered their ballades around a primary theme, which is revisited and transformed throughout the piece. This structural fluidity is fundamental to the ballade’s nature, emphasizing its origins in storytelling.

One defining characteristic of the ballade is its use of harmonic and tonal shifts to enhance its dramatic and expressive quality. Composers often employed unexpected key changes and harmonic ambiguities to create contrast and tension. For example, Chopin's Ballade No. 1 in G minor incorporates key changes that build a sense of drama and maintain the momentum of the musical narrative.

Additionally, rhythm and melody play an essential role in shaping the ballade’s narrative elements. Recurring rhythmic motifs and melodic phrases are often varied in intensity, tempo, and character, contributing to a sense of movement and emotional evolution within the piece. This use of recurring musical elements mirrors literary storytelling techniques, allowing composers to create a dynamic and expressive form.

The ballade of this time varied. In Chopin, for example, the common element throughout his ballads was the metre, commonly 6/8 time. Brahms's ballades often relied on a three-part song form.

Ballades sometimes alluded to their literary predecessors. Some had obvious or supposed literary associations. For example, the four ballads of Chopin were supposedly inspired by Ballads and Romances (Ballady i romanse), poetry of Adam Mickiewicz. However, no such evidence directly from the composer exists. There was, in fact, no concrete association to literature until Brahms debuted his four ballads (Op. 10), which bear the title "After the Scottish ballad 'Edward'". However, that claim does not acknowledge the fact that in 1841, thirteen years earlier than Brahms, Robert Schumann acknowledged in the Neue Zeitschrift für Musik that Chopin told him that he was inspired by poems of Mickiewicz.

== Romantic ballades ==
In late 18th century German literature, the term ballade was used to describe folklike narrative poetry (following Johann Gottfried Herder), some of which was set to music by composers such as Johann Friedrich Reichardt, Carl Friedrich Zelter, and Johann Rudolf Zumsteeg.

In the 19th century, the title was given by Frédéric Chopin to four important, large-scale piano pieces, the Ballades Nos. 1 to 4, Opp. 23, 38, 47, 52, the first significant application of the term to instrumental music. A number of other composers subsequently used the title for piano pieces, including Johannes Brahms (the third of his Klavierstücke, Op. 118, and the set of four Ballades, Op. 10), Edvard Grieg (Ballade in the Form of Variations, Op. 24, a set of variations), Claude Debussy, Friedrich Baumfelder (for example his Two Ballades, Op. 47, and No. 2 from his Op. 285), Franz Liszt (who wrote two) and Gabriel Fauré (Op. 19, later arranged for piano and orchestra).

Ballades for instruments other than the piano have also been written. 20th-century examples of the form include the three ballades of Manolis Kalomiris, the six ballades of Frank Martin (composed for instruments such as the cello, viola, flute, and saxophone), and Einojuhani Rautavaara's Ballade for Harp and Strings. Henry Cowell wrote a ballad for string orchestra.

There are also ballads for orchestra by Grace Williams, Gottfried von Einem, Alexander Glazunov, and Kurt Atterberg, and for solo instruments and orchestra; piano: Ture Rangström, Germaine Tailleferre, Darius Milhaud, Ludomir Różycki, and Norman Dello Joio; cello: Heino Eller, Reinhold Glière, and Frederic d'Erlanger; Julius Röntgen (violin), Benjamin Britten (two pianos), Hermann Haller (horn), and Hendrik Andriessen (oboe); as well as ballads for various other combinations of instruments and voices by György Ligeti, Eric Ewazen, Spike Milligan and Larry Stephens, Sergei Prokofiev, Ottorino Respighi, and Kurt Weill.

== Collaborative piano ballades ==
The ballade has also been used in works featuring multiple instruments. For example, Robert Schumann, a romantic composer and husband of Clara Schumann, wrote a set of two songs, Balladen, Op. 122 (1852–53) which were written for piano and voice. Claude Debussy, a later composer, also wrote for piano and voice with his Trois ballades de François Villon (L. 119, 1910).

Works for piano and orchestra also bearing the title "ballade" have been published. These include Fauré's Ballade, Op. 19, which was written in 1881 together with its version for solo piano, Charles Koechlin's Ballade for piano and orchestra, Op. 50, conceived between 1911 and 1919, and Germaine Tailleferre's Ballade, composed in 1920.

== Examples of piano ballades ==
- Frédéric Chopin
  - Ballade No. 1 in G minor, Op. 23 (1831–1835)
  - Ballade No. 2 in F major, Op. 38 (1836–1839)
  - Ballade No. 3 in A♭ major, Op. 47 (1840–1841)
  - Ballade No. 4 in F minor, Op. 52 (1842)
- Clara Schumann, one of the 6 Soirées musicale, Ballade in D minor (1836)
- César Franck, Ballade, Op. 9 (1844)
- Franz Liszt
  - Ballade No. 1 in D♭ major, S. 170 (1845–48)
  - Ballade No. 2 in B minor, S. 171 (1853)
- Johannes Brahms, Ballades, Op. 10 (1854), consists of four ballades
- Edvard Grieg, Ballade in the Form of Variations on a Norwegian Folk Song, Op. 24 (1875–76)
- Gabriel Fauré, Ballade, Op. 19 (1881)
- Claude Debussy, Ballade (1891, revised 1903)
- Amy Beach, Ballad, Op. 6 (1894)
- George Enescu, Ballade (1894)
- Manuel Ponce, Balada Mexicana (1915)
- Charles Villiers Stanford
  - Ballade for piano in F major, from the Op. 148 set Night Thoughts (1917)
  - Ballade for piano in G minor, Op. 170 (1919)
- Alan Rawsthorne
  - Ballade in G♯ minor (1929)
  - Ballade (1967)
- John Ireland
  - Ballad (1929)
  - Ballade of London Nights (1930)
- Norman Demuth, Ballade triste (1941)
- Alexandre Tansman, Three Ballades for piano (1941)
- Humphrey Searle, Ballade for piano, Op. 10 (1947)
- William Wordsworth, Ballade for piano, Op. 41 (1949)
- Samuel Barber, Ballade for piano, Op. 46 (1977)
- Henri Pousseur, Ballade berlinoise for piano (1977)
- George Perle, Ballade (1981), written for Richard Goode
- William Bolcom, Ballade, written for Ursula Oppens, premiered January 21, 2008
