= Paul Metsers =

Dutch musician

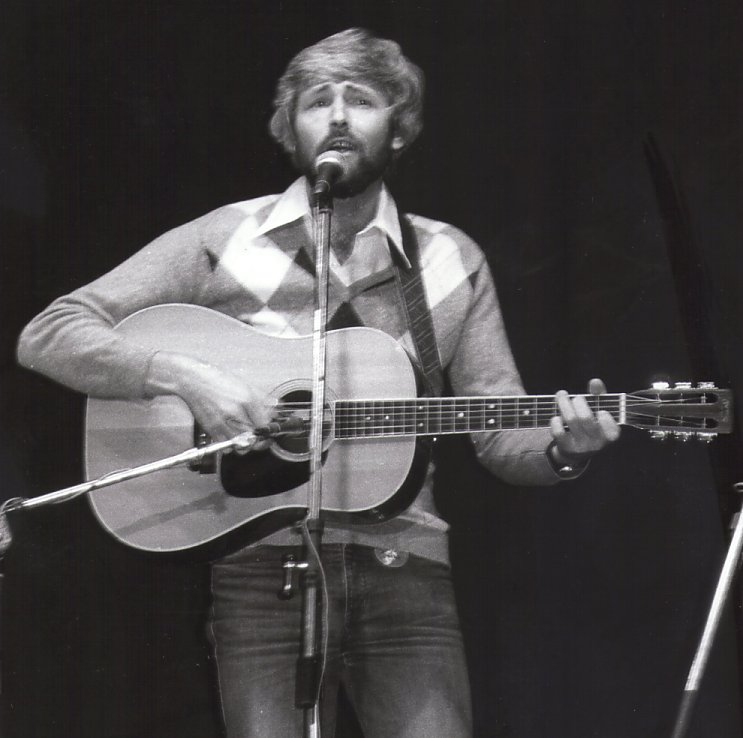
- Metsers at the 1981 Norwich Folk Festival, England

Background information
- Birth name: Paul Theodore Metsers
- Born: 27 November 1945 (age 79); Noordwijk, Netherlands
- Genres: Folk
- Occupation(s): Singer, songwriter, guitarist
- Instrument(s): guitar, appalachian dulcimer, mandocello
- Years active: ca.1970-1989, 2010-present
- Website: http://www.paulmetsers.com/

Paul Metsers (born 27 November 1945) is a Dutch-born New Zealand-British folk songwriter and solo performer who toured the UK folk clubs extensively in the 1980s, before effectively retiring in 1989. He released five albums of his own songs over that period; one of his most widely known songs is "Farewell to the Gold" which was also popularised by Nic Jones. "Farewell to the Gold" was recorded by Peter Case on his 2021 release, The Midnight Broadcast.

== Biography ==
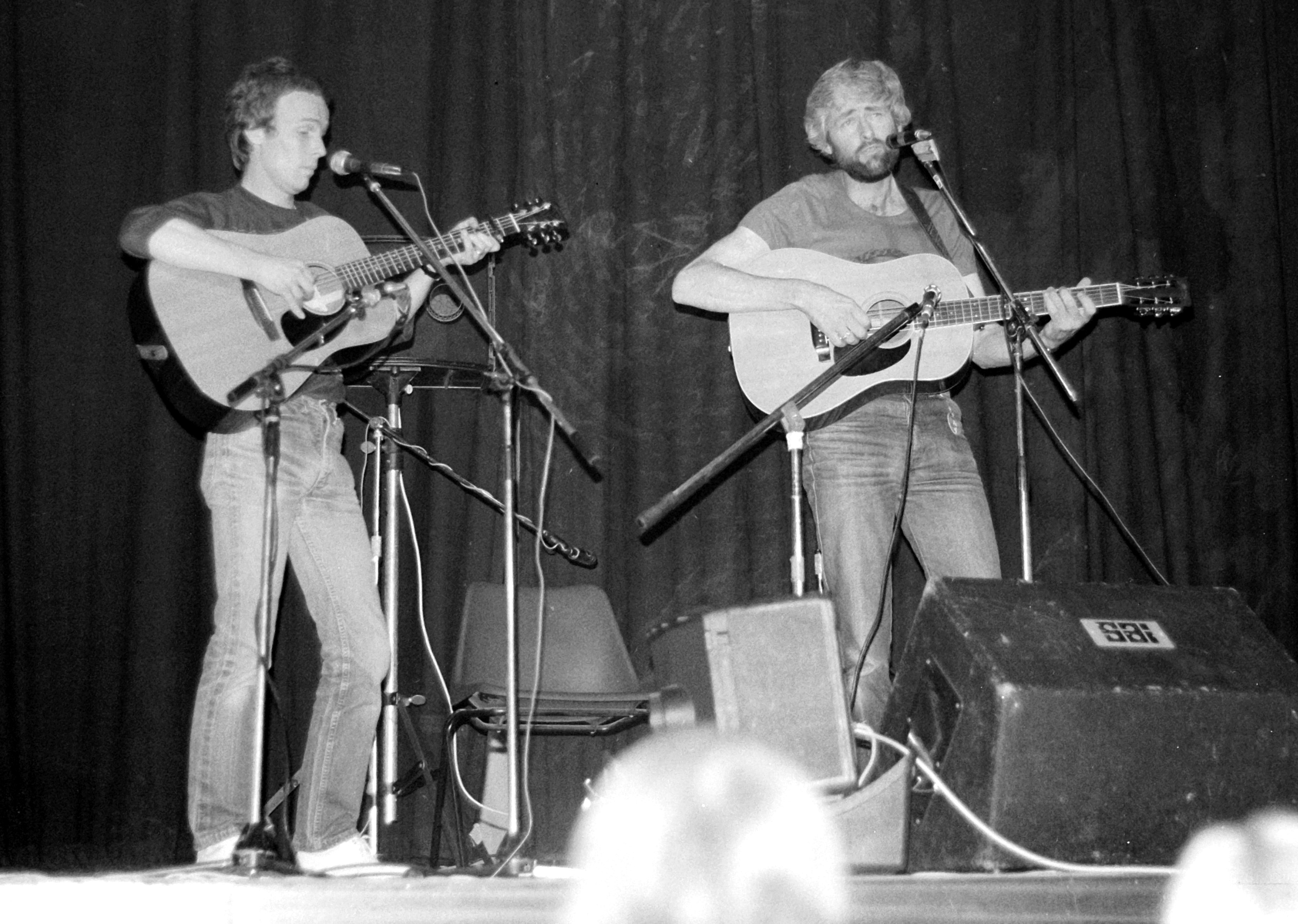
Allan Taylor (L) and Paul Metsers (R), Norwich Festival 1981

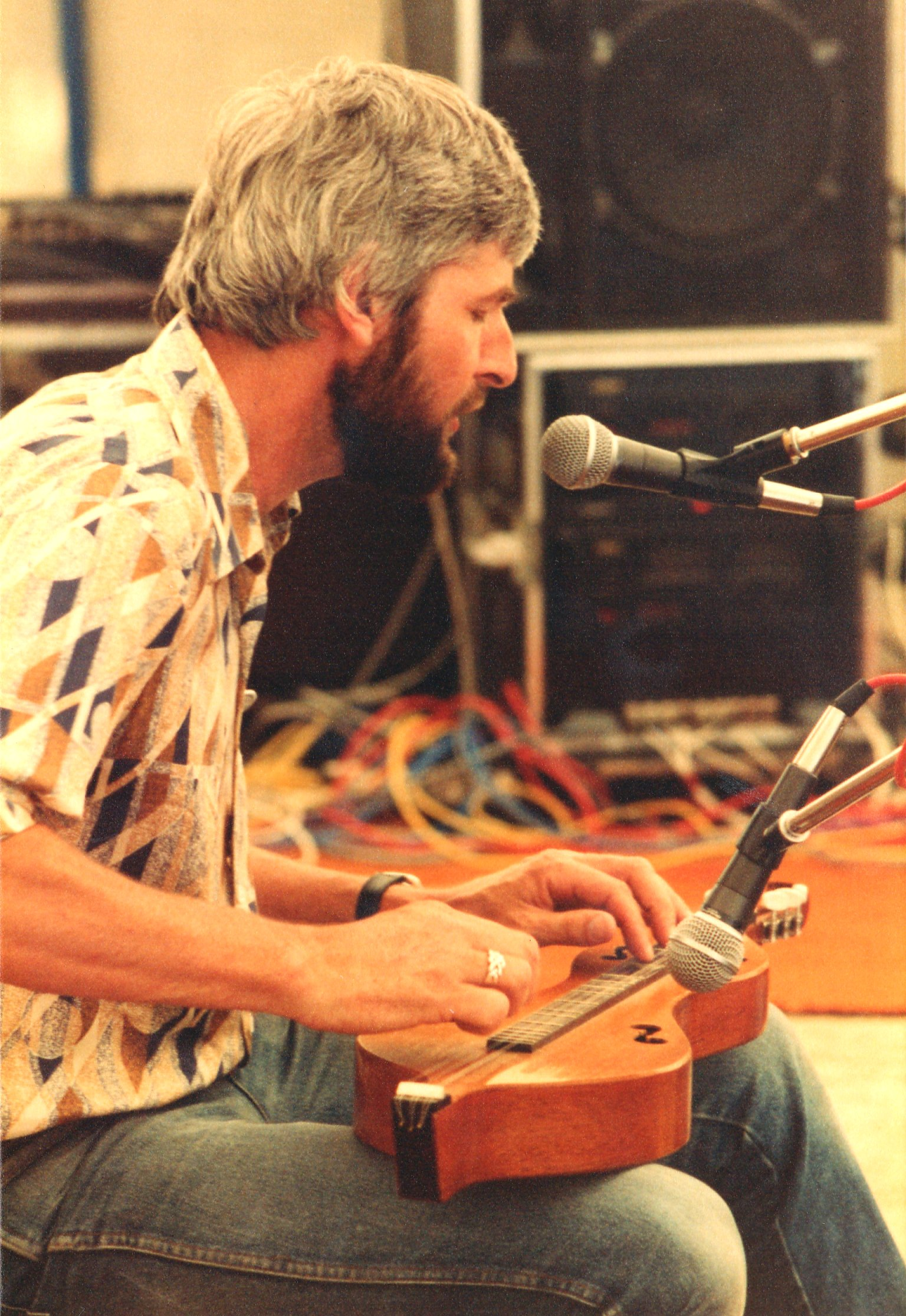
Metsers sings and plays his dulcimer on stage at the 1982 Trowbridge Village Pump Festival

Paul Metsers was born in Noordwijk, Netherlands. His family emigrated to New Zealand in 1952 and there he bought his first guitar and started writing songs, performing them locally until he decided to move to United Kingdom in 1980 and try to establish a reputation on the UK folk club scene. He did successfully over the next several years, assisted by the popularity of one song in particular, "Farewell to the Gold" which as well as being performed by its writer was sung widely by the well known performer Nic Jones and included on the latter's 1980 album Penguin Eggs. Colin Irwin, music writer for Melody Maker, has described Metsers as "a songwriter of genuine depth and versatility". Metsers released one album A Song For You on cassette in New Zealand followed by five in the UK on the Highway and Sagem labels, after which he decided to retire from professional performing in 1989. The Paul Metsers Songbook, published in 1986, contained many of the songs from his first four albums, plus one that would appear on Fifth Quarter.

He currently lives in Cumbria in the English Lake District. Since 2010, he has been performing again on a limited basis, and has a collection of new songs for eventual planned album release.

== Discography ==
- A Song For You, Jolly Roger Records CHEST 6014 1979 (cassette release) album details
- Caution To The Wind, Highway Records SHY 7014 1981 album details
- Momentum, Highway Records SHY 7021 1982 album details
- In The Hurricane's Eye, Sagem Records SGM 279 1984 album details
- Pacific Pilgrim, Sagem Records SGM 379 1986 album details
- Fifth Quarter, Sagem Records SGM 479 1987 album details
