= Canada-I-O =

Traditional English folk ballad

Song
- Written: before 1700
- Songwriter(s): Traditional

"Canada-I-O" (also known as "Canadee-I-O" or "The Wearing of the Blue") is a traditional English folk ballad (Roud 309). It is believed to have been written before 1839.

When her love goes to sea, a lady dresses as a sailor and joins (his or another's) ship's crew. When she is discovered, (the crew/her lover) determine to drown her. The captain saves her and they marry.

Based on similarity of title, some connect this song with "Canaday-I-O, Michigan-I-O, Colley's Run I-O". There is no connection in plot, however, and any common lyrics are probably the result of cross-fertilization.

The Scottish song "Caledonia/Pretty Caledonia" is quite different in detail — so much so that it is separate from the "Canada-I-O" texts in the Roud Folk Song Index ("Canaday-I-O" is #309; "Caledonia" is #5543). The plot, however, is too close for scholars to distinguish.

== Broadsides ==
- Bodleian, Harding B 11(1982), "Kennady I-o," J. Catnach (London), 1813-1838; also Firth c.12(329), Harding B 11(2039), "Lady's Trip to Kennedy"; Harding B 25(1045), "The Lady's Trip to Kennady"; Firth c.12(330), "Canada Heigho"; Firth c.13(240), Firth c.12(331), Harding B 11(2920), 2806 c.16(72), "Canada I, O"

== Recordings ==
- Nic Jones, "Canadee-I-O" (on Penguin Eggs, 1980)
- Bob Dylan, "Canadee-i-o" (on Good as I Been to You, 1992)
- Seven Nations, "Canadee-i-o" (on Old Ground, 1995)
- Warren Zevon, "Canadee-I-O" (Live on Edmonton Folk Music Festival, 2002)
- The White Stripes, "Canadee I-O" (on Under Great White Northern Lights, B-Shows, 2010)
- 10,000 Maniacs (on Twice Told Tales, 2015)
- The Outside Track, "Canadee-I-O" (on Light Up The Dark, 2015)
- Shirley Collins, "Canadee-i-o" (on Heart's Ease, 2020)
- Oli Steadman, on his song collection "365 Days Of Folk". (2024)

== Alternative titles ==
- "Canada Heigho!!"
- "Kennady I-o"
- "Lady's Trip to Kennady"
