= From the Devil to a Stranger =

Studio album by Nic Jones
- Released: 1978
- Genre: Folk
- Length: 46:32
- Label: Transatlantic Records
- Producer: Bill Leader

Nic Jones chronology
| The Noah's Ark Trap (1977) | From the Devil to a Stranger (1978) | Penguin Eggs (1980) |

From the Devil to a Stranger is the fourth studio album by Nic Jones, released in 1978 by Transatlantic Records, The Leader Tradition, and Highway Records. The album features Nic Jones performing vocals, guitar, and fiddle, and Helen Watson on piano. The vinyl sleeve, featuring the painted image of a devil and a travelling man, was designed by Janet Kerr.

== Track listing ==
| No. | Title | Music | Length |
|---|---|---|---|
| 1. | "The Singer's Request" | Nic Jones, Helen Watson | 2:34 |
| 2. | "Some Say the Devil's Dead" | Nic Jones | 2:26 |
| 3. | "Billy Don't You Weep for Me" | Nic Jones | 4:24 |
| 4. | "William Glen" | Nic Jones | 5:50 |
| 5. | "The Blind Harper" | Nic Jones | 4:10 |
| 6. | "The Singer's Request" | Nic Jones, Helen Watson | 0:43 |
| 7. | "The Little Heathy Hill" | Nic Jones | 2:33 |
| 8. | "Far from Home" | Nic Jones | 1:55 |
| 9. | "Master Kilby" | Nic Jones, Helen Watson | 3:53 |
| 10. | "The Lakes of Shilin" | Nic Jones | 4:49 |
| 11. | "Newport Street" | Nic Jones | 4:19 |
| 12. | "The Green Mossy Banks of the Lea" | Nic Jones | 5:35 |
| 13. | "The Singer's Request" | Nic Jones, Helen Watson | 1:03 |
| Total length: | | | 44:14 ... |
