= Elegy =

Poem of serious reflection, usually a lament for the dead

An elegy is a poem or song of serious reflection, expressing feelings of melancholy, grief or extreme sorrow. It is not to be confused with a eulogy, which is a speech or writing in praise of a dead person. However, according to The Oxford Handbook of the Elegy, "For all of its pervasiveness ... the 'elegy' remains remarkably ill defined: sometimes used as a catch-all to denominate texts of a somber or pessimistic tone, sometimes as a marker for textual monumentalizing, and sometimes strictly as a sign of a lament for the dead."

== History ==
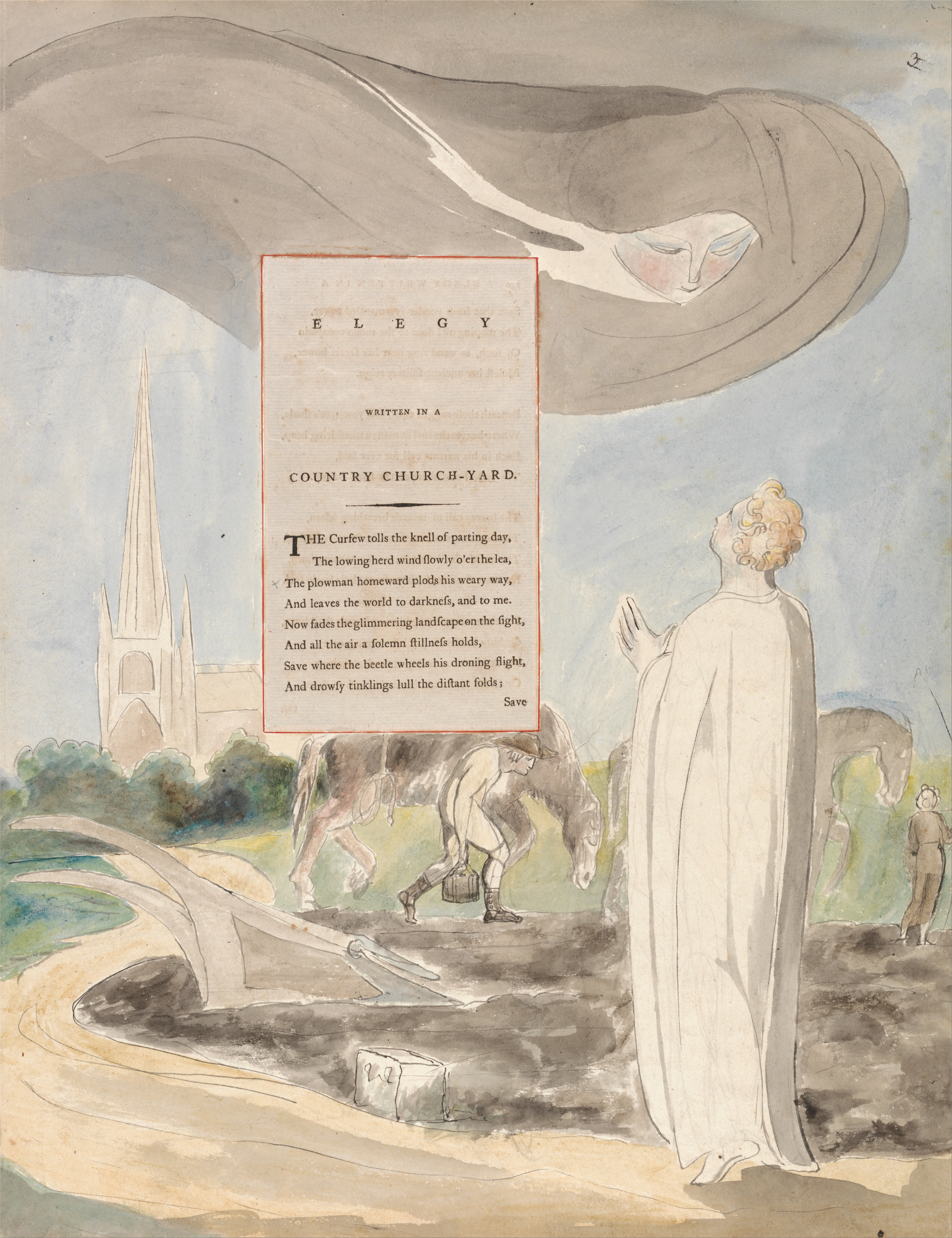
Elegy Written in a Country Church-Yard, illustration by William Blake

The Greek term ἐλεγείᾱ (elegeíā; from ἔλεγος, élegos, ‘lament’) originally referred to any verse written in elegiac couplets and covering a wide range of subject matter (death, love, war). The term also included epitaphs, sad and mournful songs, and commemorative verses. The Latin elegy of ancient Roman literature was most often erotic or mythological in nature. Because of its structural potential for rhetorical effects, the elegiac couplet was also used by both Greek and Roman poets for witty, humorous, and satirical subject matter.

Other than epitaphs, examples of ancient elegy as a poem of mourning include Catullus's Carmen 101, on his dead brother, and elegies by Propertius on his dead mistress Cynthia and a matriarch of the prominent Cornelian family. Ovid wrote elegies bemoaning his exile, which he likened to a death.

=== Literature ===
==== English ====
In English literature, the more modern and restricted meaning, of a lament for a departed beloved or tragic event, has been current only since the sixteenth century; the broader concept was still employed by John Donne for his elegies written in the early seventeenth century. That looser concept is especially evident in the Old English Exeter Book (c. 1000 CE), which contains "serious meditative" and well-known poems such as "The Wanderer", "The Seafarer", and "The Wife's Lament". In those elegies, the narrators use the lyrical "I" to describe their own personal and mournful experiences. They tell the story of the individual rather than the collective lore of a people, as epic poetry seeks to tell. By the time of Samuel Taylor Coleridge and others, the term had come to mean "serious meditative poem":

Elegy is a form of poetry natural to the reflective mind. It may treat of any subject, but it must treat of no subject for itself; but always and exclusively with reference to the poet. As he will feel regret for the past or desire for the future, so sorrow and love became the principal themes of the elegy. Elegy presents every thing as lost and gone or absent and future.

A famous example of elegy is Thomas Gray's Elegy Written in a Country Churchyard (1750).

==== Other languages ====
In French, perhaps the most famous elegy is Le Lac (1820) by Alphonse de Lamartine.

In Germany, the most famous example is Duino Elegies by Rainer Maria Rilke (1922).

In the Islamic world—namely Shia Islam—the most famous examples are elegies written on the Battle of Karbala. Elegies written on Husayn ibn Ali and his followers are very common and produced even today.

In Spain, one of the capital works in Spanish is Coplas por la Muerte de su Padre (Stanzas About the Death of His Father), written between 1460 and 1470 by Jorge Manrique.

=== Music ===
"Elegy" (French: élégie) may denote a type of musical work, usually of a sad or somber nature. A well-known example is the Élégie, Op. 10, by Jules Massenet. This was originally written for piano, as a student work; then he set it as a song; and finally it appeared as the "Invocation", for cello and orchestra, a section of his incidental music to Leconte de Lisle's Les Érinnyes. Other examples include Gabriel Fauré's Elegy in C minor (op. 24) for cello and piano, the Elegy Op. 58 of Edward Elgar, the Elegy for Strings of Benjamin Britten, and the first movement, "Elegy", of Pēteris Vasks's String Quartet No. 4. Though not specifically designated an elegy, Samuel Barber's Adagio for Strings has an elegiac character.

== See also ==
- Dirge
- Elegiac
- Funeral march
- Keening
- Kommós
- Lament
- Marsiya
- Noha
- Obituary poetry
- Pastoral elegy history
- Poetry
- Rithā'
- Soaz
- Threnody
