= Matty Groves =

Traditional English ballad

- English folk song
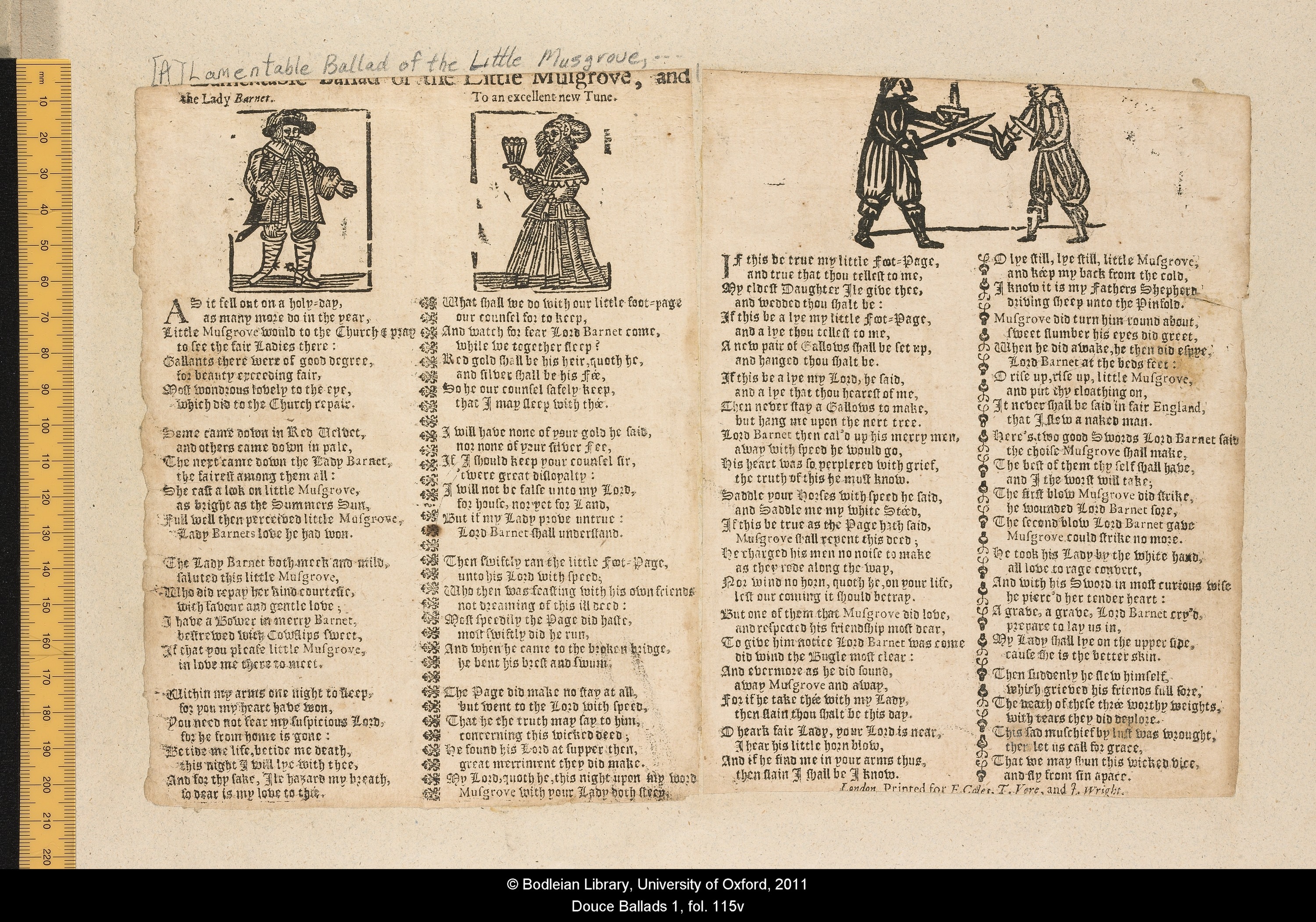
- "A lamentable ballad of the little Musgrove". A seventeenth-century broadside held in the Bodleian Library.
- Catalogue: Child Ballad 81; Roud Folk Song Index 52
- Genre: Ballad
- Language: English
- Performed: First attested in writing in 1613
- Published: Earliest surviving broadside dated to before 1675
- Also known by several other names

Howie Mitchell recording

"Matty Groves", also known as "Little Musgrave and Lady Barnard" or "Little Musgrave", is a ballad probably originating in Northern England that describes an adulterous tryst between a young man and a noblewoman that is ended when the woman's husband discovers and kills them. It is listed as Child ballad number 81 and number 52 in the Roud Folk Song Index. This song exists in many textual variants and has several variant names. The song dates to at least 1613, and under the title Little Musgrave and Lady Barnard is one of the Child ballads collected by 19th-century American scholar Francis James Child.

== Synopsis ==
Little Musgrave (or Matty Groves, Little Matthew Grew and other variations) goes to church on a holy day either "the holy word to hear" or "to see fair ladies there". He sees Lord Barnard's wife, the fairest lady there, and realises that she is attracted to him. She invites him to spend the night with her, and he agrees when she tells him her husband is away from home. Her page overhears the conversation and goes to find Lord Barnard (Arlen, Daniel, Arnold, Donald, Darnell, Darlington) and tells him that Musgrave is in bed with his wife. Lord Barnard promises the page a large reward if he is telling the truth and to hang him if he is lying. Lord Barnard and his men ride to his home, where he surprises the lovers in bed. Lord Barnard tells Musgrave to dress because he doesn't want to be accused of killing a naked man. Musgrave says he dare not because he has no weapon, and Lord Barnard gives him the better of two swords. In the subsequent duel Little Musgrave wounds Lord Barnard, who then kills him. (However, in one version "Magrove" instead runs away, naked but alive.)

Lord Barnard then asks his wife whether she still prefers Little Musgrave to him and when she says she would prefer a kiss from the dead man's lips to her husband and all his kin, he kills her. He then says he regrets what he has done and orders the lovers to be buried in a single grave, with the lady at the top because "she came of the better kin". In some versions Barnard is hanged, or kills himself, or finds his own infant son dead in his wife's body. Many versions omit one or more parts of the story.

It has been speculated that the original names of the characters, Little Musgrave and Lady Barnard, come from place names in the north of England (specifically Little Musgrave in Westmorland and Barnard Castle in County Durham). The place name "Bucklesfordbury", found in both English and American versions of the song, is of uncertain origin.

Some versions of the ballad include elements of an alba, a poetic form in which lovers part after spending a night together.

== Early printed versions ==
There are few broadside versions. There are three different printings in the Bodleian Library's Broadside Ballads Online, all dating from the second half of the seventeenth century. One, The lamentable Ditty of the little Mousgrove, and the Lady Barnet from the collection of Anthony Wood, has a handwritten note by Wood on the reverse stating that "the protagonists were alive in 1543".

Below are the first four verses as written in a version published in 1658.

As it fell one holy-day, hay downe,
As many be in the yeare,
When young men and maids
Together did goe,
Their Mattins and Masse to heare,

Little Musgrave came to the church dore,
The Preist was at private Masse
But he had more minde of the faire women;
Then he had of our lady grace

The one of them was clad in green
Another was clad in pale,
And then came in my lord Bernards wife
The fairest amonst them all;

She cast an eye on little Musgrave
As bright as the summer sun,
And then bethought this little Musgrave
This lady's heart have I woonn.

== Traditional recordings ==
It seems that the ballad had largely died out in the British Isles by the time folklorists began collecting songs. Cecil Sharp collected a version from an Agnes Collins in London in 1908, the only known version to have been collected in England. James Madison Carpenter recorded some Scottish versions, probably in the early 1930s, which can be heard on the Vaughan Williams Memorial Library website. The Scottish singer Jeannie Robertson was recorded on separate occasions singing a traditional version of the song entitled "Matty Groves" in the late 1950s by Alan Lomax, Peter Kennedy and Hamish Henderson. However, according to the Tobar an Dualchais website, Robertson may have learned her version from Johnny Wells and Sandy Paton, Paton being an American singer and folk song collector.

Dozens of traditional versions of the ballad were recorded in the Appalachian region. Jean Bell Thomas recorded Green Maggard singing "Lord Daniel" in Ashland, Kentucky, in 1934, which was released on the anthology 'Kentucky Mountain Music' Yazoo YA 2200. Bascom Lamar Lunsford was recorded singing a version called "Lord Daniel's Wife" in 1935. Samuel Harmon, known as "Uncle" Sam Harmon, was recorded by Herbert Halpert in Maryville, Tennessee, in 1939 singing a traditional version. The influential Appalachian folk singer Jean Ritchie had her family version of the ballad, called "Little Musgrave", recorded by Alan Lomax in 1949, who made a reel-to-reel recording of it in his apartment in Greenwich Village; she later released a version on her album Ballads from her Appalachian Family Tradition (1961). In August 1963, John Cohen recorded Dillard Chandler singing "Mathie Groves" in Sodom, North Carolina, whilst Nimrod Workman, another Appalachian singer, had a traditional version of the song recorded in 1974.

The folklorist Helen Hartness Flanders recorded many versions in New England in the 1930s and 40s, all of which can be heard online in the Flanders Ballad Collection.

Canadian folklorists such as Helen Creighton, Kenneth Peacock and Edith Fowke recorded about a dozen versions in Canada, mostly in Nova Scotia and Newfoundland.

A number of songs and tales collected in the Caribbean are based on, or refer to, the ballad.

== Textual variants and related ballads ==
Variant	Lord/Lady's surname	Lover	Notes
The Old ballad of Little Musgrave and the Lady Barnard	Barnard	Little Musgrave	This version has the foot-page
Mattie Groves	Arlen	Little Mattie Groves	
Matty Groves	Darnell	Matty Groves	

Some of the versions of the song subsequently recorded differ from Child's catalogued version. The earliest published version appeared in 1658 (see Literature section below). A copy was also printed on a broadside by Henry Gosson, who is said to have printed between 1607 and 1641. Some variation occurs in where Matty is first seen; sometimes at church, sometimes playing ball.

Matty Groves also shares some mid-song stanzas with the ballad "Fair Margaret and Sweet William" (Child 74, Roud 253).

Other names for the ballad:

- Based on the lover
  - Little Sir Grove
  - Little Massgrove
  - Matthy Groves
  - Wee Messgrove
  - Little Musgrave
  - Young Musgrave
  - Little Mushiegrove
- Based on the lord
  - Lord Aaron
  - Lord Arlen
  - Lord Arnold
  - Lord Barlibas
  - Lord Barnabas
  - Lord Barnaby
  - Lord Barnard
  - Lord Barnett
  - Lord Bengwill
  - Lord Darlen
  - Lord Darnell
  - Lord Donald
- Based on a combination of names
  - Little Musgrave and Lady Barnard
  - Little Musgrave and Lady Barnet
  - Lord Barnett and Little Munsgrove
  - Lord Vanner’s Wife [and Magrove]

== Literature ==
The earliest known reference to the ballad is in Beaumont and Fletcher's 1613 play The Knight of the Burning Pestle:

And some they whistled, and some they sung,
Hey, down, down!
And some did loudly say,
Ever as the Lord Barnet's horn blew,
Away, Musgrave, away!

Al Hine's 1961 novel Lord Love a Duck opens and closes with excerpts from the ballad, and borrows the names Musgrave and Barnard for two characters.

Deborah Grabien's third book in the Haunted Ballad series, Matty Groves (2005), puts a different spin on the ballad.

== Commercial recordings ==
Versions of some performers could be mentioned as the most notable or successful, including those by Jean Ritchie or Martin Carthy.

Year	Release (Album / "Single")	Performer	Variant	Notes
1956	John Jacob Niles Sings American Folk Songs	John Jacob Niles	Little Mattie Groves	
1958	Shep Ginandes Sings Folk Songs	Shep Ginandes	Mattie Groves	
1960	British Traditional Ballads in the Southern Mountains, Volume 2	Jean Ritchie	Little Musgrave	
1962	Joan Baez in Concert	Joan Baez	Matty Groves	
1964	Introducing the Beers Family	Beers Family	Mattie Groves	
1966	Home Again!	Doc Watson	Matty Groves	
1969	Liege & Lief	Fairport Convention	Matty Groves	Set to the tune of the otherwise unrelated Appalachian song "Shady Grove"; this hybrid version has therefore entered other performers' repertoires over time (the frequency of this as well as the similarity of the names has led to the erroneous assumption that "Shady Grove" is directly descended from "Matty Groves"). Several live recordings also.
1969	Prince Heathen	Martin Carthy	Little Musgrave and Lady Barnard	
1970	Ballads and Songs	Nic Jones	Little Musgrave	
1976	Christy Moore	Christy Moore	Little Musgrave	Set to a tune Andy Irvine learnt from Nic Jones
1980	The Woman I Loved So Well	Planxty	Little Musgrave	
1986	Don't Ask	Frank Hayes	Like a Lamb to the Slaughter	Done as a parody talking blues version
1990	Masque	Paul Roland	Matty Groves	
1992	Just Gimme Somethin' I'm Used To	Norman and Nancy Blake	Little Matty Groves	
1992	Out Standing in a Field	The Makem Brother and Brian Sullivan	Matty Groves	
1993	In Good King Arthur's Day	Graham Dodsworth	Little Musgrave	
1994	You Could Be the Meadow	Eden Burning		
1995	Live at the Mineshaft Tavern	ThaMuseMeant		
1997	On and On	Fiddler's Green	Matty Groves	
1994	You Could Be the Meadow	Eden Burning		
1999	Trad Arr Jones	John Wesley Harding	Little Musgrave	
2000	Hepsankeikka	Tarujen Saari	Kaunis neito	(In Finnish)
2001	Listen, Listen	Continental Drifters	Matty Groves	
2002	Ralph Stanley	Ralph Stanley	Little Mathie Grove	
2004	Live 2004	Planxty	Little Musgrave	
2005	Dark Holler: Old Love Songs and Ballads	Dillard Chandler	Mathie Grove	Acapella Appalachian.
2005	De Andere Kust	Kadril	Matty Groves	
2007	Season of the Witch	The Strangelings	Matty Groves	
2007	Prodigal Son	Martin Simpson	Little Musgrave	
2008	The Peacemaker's Chauffeur	Jason Wilson	Matty Groves	Reggae version, featuring Dave Swarbrick & Brownman Ali
2009	Folk Songs	James Yorkston and the Big Eyes Family Players	Little Musgrave	
2009	Alela & Alina	Alela Diane featuring Alina Hardin	Matty Groves, Lord Arland	
2009	Tales From the Crow Man	Damh the Bard	Matty Groves	
2009	Orphans: Brawlers, Bawlers & Bastards	Tom Waits	Mathie Grove	
2010	Sweet Joan	Sherwood	Matty Groves	(In Russian)
2011	Birds' Advice	Elizabeth Laprelle	Mathey Groves	
2011	"Little Musgrave"	The Musgraves	Little Musgrave	YouTube video recorded to explain the band's name
2011	In Silence	Marc Carroll	Matty Groves	
2012	Retrospective	The Kennedys	Matty Groves	
2013	The Irish Connection 2	Johnny Logan		
2013	Fugitives	Moriarty	Matty Groves	
2019	Dark Turn of Mind	Iona Fyfe	Little Musgrave	Scots folklore variant written in Scottish English
2019	Návrat krále	Asonance	Matty Groves	(In Czech)
2024	Kleptocracy	Ferocious Dog	Matty Groves	

== Film and television ==
=== Film ===
In the film Songcatcher (2000), the song is performed by Emmy Rossum and Janet McTeer.

=== Television ===
In season 5 episode 2, "Gently with Class" (2012), of the British television series Inspector George Gently, the song is performed by Ebony Buckle, playing the role of singer Ellen Mallam in that episode, singing it as "Matty Groves".

== Musical variants ==
In 1943, the English composer Benjamin Britten used this folk song as the basis of a choral piece entitled "The Ballad of Little Musgrave and Lady Barnard".

"The Big Musgrave", a parody by the Kipper Family, appears on their 1988 LP Fresh Yesterday. The hero in this version is called Big Fatty Groves.

Frank Hayes created a talking blues version of Matty Groves called "Like a Lamb to the Slaughter," which won the 1994 Pegasus Award for "Best Risqué Song."

"Maggie Gove", a parody by UK comedy folk-band The Bar-Steward Sons of Val Doonican, appears on their 2022 album Rugh & Ryf. The anti-hero in this version is Margaret Gove, a folk-singer of traditional broadside ballads. The song features guest appearances from Dave Pegg and Dave Mattacks from Fairport Convention.

== See also ==
The previous and next Child Ballads:

- "The Bonny Birdy"
- "Old Robin of Portingale"

Preceded by 51	List of Roud folk songs 52	Succeeded by 53

Preceded by 80	List of the Child Ballads; 81	Succeeded by 82
