= In Search of Nic Jones =

Live album by Nic Jones
- Released: 1998
- Genre: Folk
- Label: Mollie Music : MMCD01

Nic Jones chronology
Penguin Eggs (1980)	In Search of Nic Jones (1998)	Unearthed (2001)

In Search of Nic Jones is an album by Nic Jones, released in 1998. It is a collection of remastered live recordings, performed between 1979 and 1982. The album was voted Mojo's Folk Album of the Month, August 1998.

== Track listing ==
1. "Seven Yellow Gypsies" (Traditional(Child #200, Roud #1)/Arr. Nic Jones) 3:17
2. "Texas Girl At The Funeral Of Her Father" (Randy Newman) 2:52
3. "Lord Franklin" (Traditional(Roud #487)/Arr. Nic Jones) 4:22
4. "Swimming Song" (Loudon Wainwright III) 2:54
5. "Ploughman Lads" (John Wilson(Roud #3448)) 3:13
6. "Ruins by the Shore" (Nic Jones) 3:51
7. "On Board The Kangaroo" (Traditional(Roud #925)/Arr. Nic Jones) 3:14
8. "Hardiman The Fiddler" (Traditional/Arr. Nic Jones) 1:34
9. "Green to Grey" (Nic Jones) 2:26
10. "Rose of Allendale" (Nelson/Jeffreys(Roud #1218)/Arr. Nic Jones) 4:51
11. "Teddy Bears' Picnic" (Music by John W. Bratton) 2:19
12. "Thanksgiving" (Rick Lee) 2:39

Track 1, Seven Yellow Gypsies, was recorded from a BBC "Folk on 2" session on 1 March 1981. Track 3, Lord Franklin, was recorded from a concert in Italy in 1981.
