= On Board the Kangaroo =

English shanty

On Board of the Kangaroo also known as On Board the Kangaroo, Aboard the Kangaroo, Good Ship Kangaroo and Bristol Sea Shanty is generally regarded as an English shanty. It was composed by Londoner Harry Clifton, reviewed in the press in July 1864, and published as sheet music in 1865. The song is sung from the perspective of a mariner who worked on a ship called the Kangaroo, which was probably SS Kangaroo, an 1853 Scottish cargo steamer that foundered in a gale off Rhoscolyn, Wales in January 1862. It has a Roud Folk Song Index number of 925.

== Notable recordings ==
- Elizabeth Cronin - The Songs of Elizabeth Cronin, Irish Traditional Singer: The Complete Song Collection (2000)
- Burl Ives - Songs of Ireland (1958)
- Nic Jones - In Search of Nic Jones (1998)
- Planxty - After the Break (1979)
- Tony Rose - Bare Bones (1999)
- Waldorf String Band - Celtic Celebration (2014)
