= Lord Saltoun and Auchanachie =

Traditional song

Lord Saltoun and Auchanachie (Child 239, Roud 102), also known as Annachie Gordon, is a Scottish ballad.

== Synopsis ==
At the insistence of her father, Jeannie is to be married off to the wealthy Lord Saltoun, despite being in love with Annachie (or Auchanachie) Gordon. She is dragged to the church and forcibly wed, resisting throughout. When Jeannie refuses to sleep with Lord Saltoun, her father orders her handmaidens to strip her. She collapses at his feet and dies of a broken heart for love of Annachie. Just then, Annachie returns from a sea voyage and learns from Jeannie's handmaidens that, in his absence, she has been forcibly married and died sorrow. Annachie kisses Jeannie's lifeless lips, then dies beside her, heartbroken.

== Versions ==
The words were printed in Maidment's "North Countrie Garland" (1824) and in Buchan's "Ancient Ballads and Songs 2" (1828). The tune was first printed in Bronson's "Traditional Tunes of the Child Ballads". Sometime between 1800 and 1829 a broadsheet ballad called "A New Song" was printed. This replaces the name "Auchanachie Gordon" with "Hannah Le Gordon" but is otherwise very similar. It is hard to explain why the hero was given a woman's name, unless the unusual Scots name confused the Newcastle printer.

In the 1930s, Alan Lomax recorded Aunt Molly Jackson singing an American version she called "Archie D," which is believed to be one of the earliest field recordings of this song in existence. Nic Jones recorded his version of "Annachie Gordon" on his 1977 album The Noah's Ark Trap (1977). On stylistic grounds, it has been suggested that most of the recent recordings are based on this version. They use the nonexistent placename "Harking" instead of "Buchan" (in Aberdeenshire).

Mary Black recorded "Annachie Gordon" on the album Mary Black. Loreena McKennitt recorded it on Parallel Dreams (1989). Other versions include June Tabor's on Always (2005), Sharon Shannon's on Libertango (2004), John Wesley Harding's on Trad Arr Jones (1999) and Oliver Schroer's instrumental version on Celtic Devotion (1999). Sinéad O'Connor also recorded a version on the Sharon Shannon Collection released in 2005, and Gabrielle Angelique recorded the song on her album Dance with the Stars (2006). The Unthanks 2009 album Here's the Tender Coming also has a version.

=== Traditional lyrics ===
"Auchanachie Gordon is bonny and braw,
He would tempt any woman that he ever saw;
He would tempt any woman, so has he tempted me,
And I'll die if I getna my love Auchanachie."

In came her father, tripping on the floor,
Says, "Jeanie, ye're trying the tricks o' a whore;
Ye're caring for them that cares little for thee;
Ye must marry Salton, leave Auchanachie.

"Auchanachie Gordon, he is but a man;
Altho' he be pretty, where lies his free land?
Salton's lands they lie broad, his towers they stand hie,
Ye must marry Salton, leave Auchanachie.

......
......
"Salton will gar you wear silk gowns fring'd to thy knee,
But ye'll never wear that wi' your love Auchanachie."

"Wi' Auchanachie Gordon I would beg my bread
Before that wi' Salton I'd wear gowd on my head,
Wear gowd on my head, or gowns fring'd to the knee;
And I'll die if I getna my love Auchanachie.

"O Salton's [a] valley lies low by the sea,
He's bowed on the back, and thrawin on the knee;"
.....
.....

"O Salton's a valley lies low by the sea;
Though he's bowed on the back and thrawin on the knee,
Though he's bowed on the back and thrawin on the knee,
The bonny rigs of Salton they're nae thrawin tee"

"O you that are my parents to church may me bring,
But unto Salton I'll never bear a son;
For son or for daughter, I'll ne'er bow my knee,
And I'll die if I getna my love Auchanachie."

When Jeanie was married, from church was brought hame,
When she wi her maidens sae merry shoud hae been,
When she wi her maidens sae merry shoud hae been,
She's called for a chamber, to weep there her lane.

"Come to your bed, Jeanie, my honey and my sweet,
For to stile you mistress I do not think it meet."
"Mistress or Jeanie, it is a' ane to me,
It's in your bed, Salton, I never will be."

Then out spake her father, he spake wi renown;
"Some of you that are her maidens, ye'll loose aff her gown;
Some of you that are her maidens, ye'll loose aff her gown;
And I'll mend the marriage wi' ten thousand crowns."

Then ane of her maidens they loosed aff her gown,
But bonny Jeanie Gordon she fell in a swoon;
She fell in a swoon low down by their knee;
Says, "Look on, I die for my love Auchanachie!"

That very same day Miss Jeanie did die,
And hame came Auchanachie, hame frae the sea;
Her father and mither welcomed him at the gate;
He said, "Where's Miss Jeanie, that she's nae here yet?"

Then forth came her maidens, all wringing their hands,
Saying, "Alas for your staying sae lang frae the land!
Sae lang frae the land, and sae lang on the fleed!
They've wedded your Jeanie, and now she is dead."

"Some of you, her maidens, take me by the hand,
And show me the chamber Miss Jeanie died in;"
He kissed her cold lips, which were colder than stane,
And he died in the chamber that Jeanie died in.

=== Nic Jones ===
Buchan, it's bonny, oh and there lives my love;
My heart it lies on him, it will not remove.
It will not remove for all that I have done,
Oh never will I forget my love Annachie.
For Annachie Gordon, oh he's bonny and he's braw,
He'd entice any woman that ever him saw.
He'd entice any woman and so he has done me,
Oh never will I forget my love Annachie

Down came her father, standing on the floor,
Saying, "Jeanie, you're trying the tricks of a whore.
You care nothing for a man who cares so very much for thee;
You must marry with Lord Saltoun and leave Young Annachie.
For Annachie Gordon he's only but a man
Although he may be pretty but where are all his lands?
Saltoun's lands are broad and his towers they stand high;
You must marry with Lord Saltoun and forget Young Annachie."

"With Annachie Gordon oh I'd beg for my bread
Before that I'd marry Saltoun with gold to my head.
With gold to my head and with gowns fringed to the knee,
Oh I'll die if I don't get my love Annachie.
And you that are my parents, oh to church you may me bring,
Ah but unto Lord Saltoun, oh I'll never bear a son.
Oh, A son or a daughter, oh I'll never bow my knee,
Oh, I'll die if I don't get my love Annachie."

When Jeanie was married and from church she was brought home,
And she and her maidens so merry should have been.
When she and her maidens so merry should have been
Oh, she's gone to a chamber and she's crying all alone.

"Come to bed now Jeanie, oh my honey and my sweet,
For to style you my mistress it would not be meet."
"Oh it's mistress or Jeanie, it's all the same to me,
For it's in your bed, Lord Saltoun, I never shall be."
And up and spoke her father and he's spoken with renown,
"All you who are her maidens won't you loosen off her gown."
But she fell down in a swoon, so low down by their knees,
Saying, "Look on, for I'm dying for my love Annachie."

The day that Jeanie married was the day that Jeanie died
That's the day that young Annachie come rolling from the tide
And down came her maidens and they're wringing of their hands,
Saying, "Woe to you, Annachie, for staying from the sands.
So long from the land and so long upon the flood,
Oh they've married your Jeanie and now she is dead."

"All you that are her maidens, won't you take me by the hand?
Won't you lead me to the chamber that my love lies in?"
And he's kissed her cold lips until his heart turned to stone,
And he's died in the chamber where his true love lay in.
