= Ballads and Songs =

Studio album by Nic Jones
- Released: 1970
- Genre: Folk

Nic Jones chronology
Ballads and Songs (1970)	Nic Jones (1971)

Ballads and Songs is an album by Nic Jones, released in 1970.

== Track listing ==
1. "Sir Patrick Spens" 3:53
2. "The Butcher and the Tailor's Wife" 1:51
3. "The Duke of Marlborough" 4:04
4. "Annan Water" 7:04
5. "The Noble Lord Hawkins" 2:12
6. "Don't You Be Foolish, Pray" 1:31
7. "The Outlandish Knight" 4:11
8. "Reynard the Fox" 2:17
9. "Little Musgrave" 6:11
