= Edward (ballad) =

Traditional murder ballad

"Edward" is a traditional murder ballad existing in several variants, categorised by Francis James Child as Child Ballad number 13 and listed as number 200 in the Roud Folk Song Index. The ballad, which is at least 250 years old (a text of its Swedish counterpart has been dated to the mid-17th century), has been documented and recorded numerous times across the English speaking world into the twentieth century.

== Synopsis ==
A mother questions her son about the blood on his "sword" (most likely a hunting knife, given the era when the story is occurring). He avoids her interrogation at first, claiming that it is his hawk or his horse (or some other kind of animal depending on the variation of the song), but finally admits that it is his brother, or his father, whom he has killed. He declares that he is leaving and will never return, and various creatures (wife, children, livestock) will have to fare without him. His mother then asks what she will get from his departure. He answers "a curse from hell" and implicates his mother in the murder.

== Traditional recordings ==
Several Appalachian musicians recorded the ballad; Jean Ritchie sang the Ritchie family version in 1946 with her sister (recorded by Mary Elizabeth Barnacle) and in 1961 on the album Jean Ritchie: Ballads from her Appalachian Family Tradition, whilst Bascom Lamar Lunsford (1935), Horton Barker (1941), and Almeida Riddle (1972) also had their traditional versions recorded. The children's writer Edith Ballinger Price was recorded by Helen Hartness Flanders performing a traditional version in 1945.

The song was recorded a handful of times in England; Mike Yates recorded Frank Hinchliffe of Sheffield, Yorkshire singing his version in 1977 and Danny Brazil of Gloucestershire singing a different version the following year. George Dunn of Quarry Bank, Staffordshire was recorded by Roy Parmer singing another version in 1971, which can be heard online via the Vaughan Williams Memorial Library.

In Scotland, the song was generally known as "My Son David". Recordings were made of traditional Scottish traveller Jeannie Robertson (1953), her nephew Stanley Robertson (1987) and daughter Lizzie Higgins (1970) singing the ballad; Lizzie Higgins' recording publicly available on the Vaughan Williams Memorial Library website.

Irish traditional singers such as Thomas Moran of Mohill, Co. Leitrim (1954), John "Jacko" Reilly of Boyle, Co. Roscommon (1967), Paddy Tunney of Co. Fermanagh (1976) and Christy Moore of Co. Kildare were also recorded singing versions of the ballad. Versions collected orally in Ireland are usually named "What Put the Blood" or something similar. Tunney's version, for example, (released on his Folk-Legacy CD The Man of Songs) was entitled "What put the Blood on Your Right Shoulder, Son?"

== Parallels ==
This ballad may not be complete in itself. Large portions of the ballad are also found in the longer ballads "The Twa Brothers" (Child 49) and "Lizie Wan" (Child 51).

== Parallels in other languages ==
This ballad type was also found in Northern Europe, where it is often known under "Svend i Rosensgård" or a similar name. Its general Scandinavian classification is TSB D 320, and it is known in Danish (DgF 340), Icelandic (IFkv 76), Norwegian, and Swedish (SMB 153). In Finland, it is popular as "Poikani Poloinen", both as a poem and as a song, first published in the collection Kanteletar.

In the Scandinavian versions, and the Finnish one, the stress is more on the gradual divulge of the fact that the son will never return home to his mother.

== Percy's "Edward" ==
The authenticity of one popular version of this ballad (Child 13B) has been called into question. This version originally appeared in print in Bishop Thomas Percy's 1765 edition of Reliques of Ancient English Poetry. Percy reported that he received this Scottish ballad from Sir David Dalrymple, who said he heard it from an unnamed lady. This version appears inauthentic because it seems, in short, too "good": it makes exceptional use of literary devices for maximum impact. Moreover, unlike most other versions, the father is the victim rather than the brother, and the mother receives a curse at the end. There is also little evidence that this version was disseminated orally; it seems to have appeared most often in print form. The name "Edward" appears to have come from Percy's version; versions which seem to have existed independently of Percy's don't use this name for the protagonist.

== Adaptations ==
- The version sung by John ("Jacko") Reilly in the 1960s became very popular in Ireland and was covered by Christy Moore, The Johnstons, Karan Casey, Al O'Donnell and others.
- Carl Loewe set a German translation of Percy's version to music in his Op. 1, No. 1 (1817/18).
- Franz Schubert also used Percy's version in his "Eine altschottische Ballade" D. 923 (1827).
- Johannes Brahms was inspired by Percy's version of "Edward" twice in his ballades, in opus 10 (1854) and opus 75, no. 1 (late 1870s).
- Pyotr Ilyich Tchaikovsky used a translation by Aleksey Konstantinovich Tolstoy in his Six Duets with piano accompaniment, Op. 46, No. 2 (1880).
- Algernon Charles Swinburne's poem "The Bloody Son" in his collection Poems and Ballads, 1866
- Nic Jones recorded a version of "Edward" on his 1971 album Nic Jones.
- Steeleye Span recorded a version of "Edward", arranged in a 'question and answer' format by Bob Johnson on the 1986 album Back in Line.
- Amps for Christ recorded a version on their 1999 album Circuits.
- James Yorkston recorded a version on his 2004 album Just Beyond the River.
- Sam Amidon recorded a version on his 2010 album I See the Sign.
- Oysterband recorded a version called "Son David" on Ragged Kingdom, their 2011 collaboration with June Tabor.
- Terrance Zdunich and Saar Hendelman recorded a version of "Edward" on their 2016 American Murder Song album Dawn
- Lankum included a version called "What Put The Blood" on their album Cold Old Fire, released in 2014 under the group's original name, Lynched.

== See also ==
- List of the Child Ballads
