= Sheath and Knife =

Traditional song

"Sheath and Knife" (Roud 3960, Child 16) is a folk ballad.

== Synopsis ==
A woman is pregnant with her brother's child. He takes her to the greenwood to have her child, but she dies (or he kills her at her request). He buries her and laments her death.

== Variants ==
"Leesome Brand", Child ballad 15, is closely related to this ballad, and some variants are hard to distinguish; the hero laments the death in the same language as "Sheath and Knife".

Other ballads on this theme include "The Bonny Hind", "The King's Dochter Lady Jean", and "Lizie Wan".

== Versions ==
- Ewan MacColl sang this ballad and it is included on the collection Black & White.
- Sol Invictus has a live version on the 1994 album The Death of the West.
- Maddy Prior has a version on her 1998 album Flesh & Blood.
- Helen Bonchek Schneyer performed an a cappella version on her Folk-Legacy album Ballads, Broadsides and Hymns.

== See also ==
- List of the Child Ballads
