= Nic Jones (album) =

Studio album by Nic Jones
- Released: 1971
- Genre: Folk

Nic Jones chronology
Ballads and Songs (1970)	Nic Jones (1971)	The Noah's Ark Trap (1977)

Nic Jones is an album by Nic Jones, released in 1971.

== Track listing ==
1. "The Lass Of London City" 2:08
2. "Napoleon's Lamentation" 2:53
3. "The Bonny Bunch Of Roses" 6:05
4. "Edward" 3:29
5. "The Outlandish Knight" 3:35
6. "William And Nancy's Parting" 2:13
7. "Lord Bateman" 7:09
8. "Dance To Your Daddy" 1:29
9. "The Two Brothers" 3:52
10. "The Banks Of Green Willow" 2:51
