= The Bonny Birdy =

Traditional song

The Bonny Birdy (Child 82, Roud 3972) is an English-language folk song.

== Synopsis ==
A knight is riding when a bird asks him why he is about so late and tells him his wife is with her lover. It had been a wild bird until the lover caught it and gave it to his love. She did not feed it well, so it is telling her story. It flew with the knight to her bower, and sang of how the lover should be away. The lady asks what reason there is for him to leave, and the bird sings that a man in bed with another man's wife should always leave quickly. The knight enters the bower and kills the lover.

== Sources and recordings ==
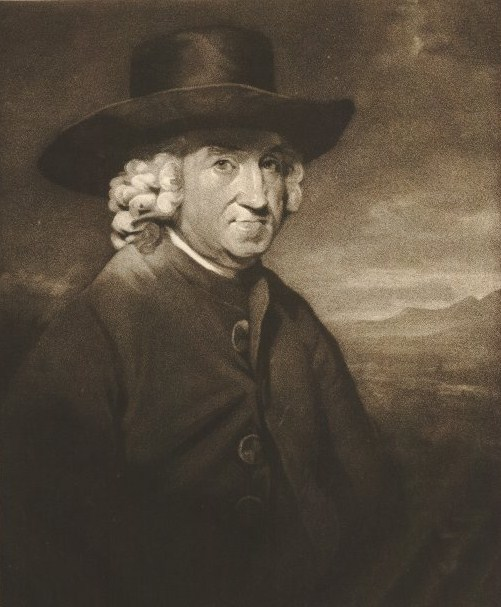
William Tytler

The ballad was written only once, in 1783 (or shortly before), from Anna Brown, by her nephew, Robert Eden Scott, and in the same year was sent by her father, prof. Thomas Gordon, to William Tytler with other 14 recorded songs (so-called Tytler-Brown MS). At least one author points out that the song "is not represented in England" and considers it as a "Scottish version" of the well-known English ballad "Little Musgrave".

== See also ==
- Old Robin of Portingale
- Little Musgrave and Lady Barnard
