= Old Robin of Portingale =

Traditional song

Old Robin of Portingale (archaic English for "Portugal") is an English-language folk song, catalogued as Roud 3971 and Child 80, and only found in the Percy Folio.

== Synopsis ==
It opens with a warning against old men marrying young women.

Old Robin of Portingale marries the daughter of the mayor of Linn. She soon goes to Sir Gyles and asks his help in murdering her husband. They make plans to attack him with twenty-four knights. His foot page overhears and weeps in the garden. When Robin asks what it is wrong, the page tells him. He promises to make him his heir if he tells the truth, and kill him if he lies.

He tells his lady that he is sick and lies down in bed in full armor. The twenty-four knights attack, and Sir Robin kills them all. He mutilates his wife for her part in the plot, makes the foot page his heir, and leaves to go on a pilgrimage to the Holy Land.

== See also ==
- The Bonny Birdy
- Little Musgrave and Lady Barnard
