= The Noah's Ark Trap =

Studio album by Nic Jones
- Released: 1977
- Genre: Folk

Nic Jones chronology
Nic Jones (1971)	The Noah's Ark Trap (1977)	From the Devil to a Stranger (1978)

The Noah's Ark Trap is an album by English folk singer Nic Jones, released in 1977.

== Track listing ==
1. "The Wanton Seed" 3:37
2. "Jackie Tar" 3:19
3. "Ten Thousand Miles" 3:22
4. "The Golden Glove" 5:51
5. "The Indian Lass" 5:56
6. "Miles Weatherhill" 3:17
7. "Reel" 2:39
8. "Isle of France" 5:17
9. "Crockery Ware" 5:15
10. "Annachie Gordon" 6:33
