= Unearthed (Nic Jones album) =

Live album by Nic Jones
- Released: 2001
- Genre: Folk
- Label: Mollie Music : MMCD02/03

Nic Jones chronology
In Search of Nic Jones (1998)	Unearthed (2001)	Game Set Match (2006)

Unearthed is a double album by Nic Jones, released in 2001. The album is a collection of remastered live material recorded before 1982.

== Track listing ==
1. "The Jukebox As She Turned" (Jeff Deitchman) 2:39
2. "Bonny George Campbell" (Trad. Arr. Nic Jones) 2:29
3. "Roxburgh Castle" (Trad. Arr. Nic Jones) 1:07
4. "Boots of Spanish Leather" (Bob Dylan) 4:26
5. "Warlike Lads Of Russia" (Trad. Arr. Nic Jones) 3:28
6. "Prickly Bush" (Trad. Arr. Nic Jones) 3:43
7. "Captain Glen" (Trad. Arr. Nic Jones) 4:17
8. "Billy Don't You Weep For Me" (Trad. Arr. Nic Jones) 4:54
9. "Fare Thee Well My Dearest Dear" (Trad. Arr. Nic Jones) 5:04
10. "Plains Of Boyle" (Trad. Arr. Nic Jones) 3:13
11. "Icarus" (Anne Lister) 4:22
12. "Rufford Park Poachers" (Trad. Arr. Nic Jones) 6:45
13. "Oh Dear, Rue The Day" (Trad. Arr. Nic Jones) 3:33
14. "Love Will You Marry Me" (Trad. Arr. Nic Jones) 1:35
15. "On A Monday Morning" (Cyril Tawney) 3:33
16. "Yarmouth Town" (Trad. Arr. Nic Jones) 2:35
17. "Master Kilby" (Trad. Arr. Nic Jones) 3:18
18. "Jimmy Allen" (Trad. Arr. Nic Jones) 1:16
19. "William Of Winesbury" (Trad. Arr. Nic Jones) 4:08
20. "Nine Times a Night" (Trad. Arr. Nic Jones) 1:25
21. "Annachie Gordon" (Trad. Arr. Nic Jones) 6:51
22. "Taoist Tale" (Tucker Zimmerman) 6:26
23. "Rapunzel" (Trad. Arr. Nic Jones) 3:18
24. "Clyde Water" (Trad. Arr. Nic Jones) 7:11
25. "Hamburger Polka" (Trad. Arr. Nic Jones) 1:23
26. "Barbara Ellen" (Trad. Arr. Nic Jones) 6:45
27. "Wanton Seed" (Trad. Arr. Nic Jones) 2:06
28. "Sonny Brogan's Mazurka" (Trad. Arr. Nic Jones) 1:38
29. "Dives And Lazarus" (Trad. Arr. Nic Jones) 5:50
30. "I'm Going in a Field" (Ivor Cutler) 2:54
31. "Ten Thousand Miles" (Trad. Arr. Nic Jones) 4:54
