= The Butcher and the Tailor's Wife =

Traditional song

"The Butcher and the Tailor's Wife" also known as "Benjamin Bowmaneer" (Roud #1528) is a traditional English folk song.

It dates from the mid-17th century and exists in several versions, for example "The Tailor's Breeches", "The Tailor and the Louse", "The Bold Trooper", and "The Trooper and the Tailor". In all versions the tailor suffers a variety of humiliating indignities.

== Synopsis ==
In a version sung by Nic Jones, the tailor is a cowardly man dominated by his wife. She goes to the butcher for a joint of meat and hatches a plan whereby her husband is to hide under the bed with a sword while she lies with the butcher, explaining that, by doing this, her husband might become a rich butcher himself. When the time arrives the butcher sees the tailor's leg and, thinking it belongs to a dog, announces that he will fire a gunshot to scare it away. On hearing this the tailor leaps up and says that, if the butcher spares his life, he can have his wife.

In other versions, the wife is replaced by a louse with whom the tailor goes to battle. Eventually, and despite many humiliating reverses witnessed by tinker, broom-makers and beggars, the tailor emerges victorious, but it is a pyrrhic victory.

== Recordings ==
- Paul Clayton recorded this song as "The Butcher and the Tailor's Wife" on his 1958 album, Unholy Matrimony
- Nic Jones used the same title on his 1970 album, Ballads and Songs
- Sandy Paton and others on The New Golden Ring: Five Days Singing as "Benjamin Bowmaneer", released by Folk-Legacy Records in 1971.
- Scafell Pike recorded the song as "Benjamin Bowmaneer" on their 1973 album, The Month of Maying
- Eliza Carthy recorded the song as "Benjamin Bowmaneer" on her 1998 album, Red Rice
- Jigby/Michèle Welborn recorded the song with the same title on their 1999 album, Jigby History
- Colcannon recorded the song as "Benjamin Bowmaneer" on their 2003 album, Trad.
- Mary Hampton recorded the song as "Benjamin Bowmaneer" on her 2011 album, Folly
- Kate Rusby recorded the song as 'Benjamin Bowmaneer' on her 2016 album Life in a Paper Boat.

== Recent performances ==
- Mary Hampton
- Eliza Carthy
- Kerfuffle
- Kate Rusby
