= Ballades, Op. 10 (Brahms) =

1854 piano compositions by Johannes Brahms

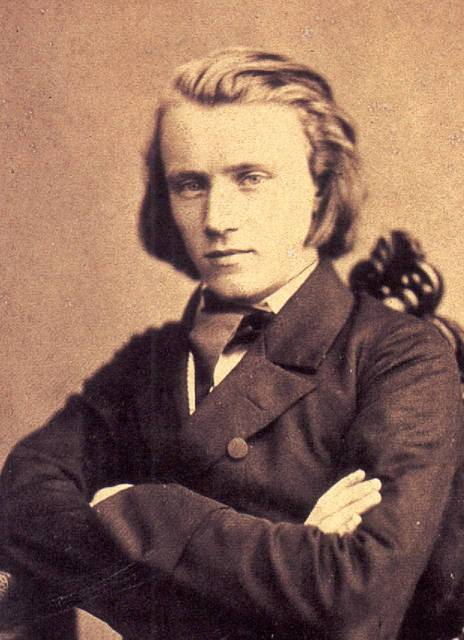
Johannes Brahms in 1853

The Ballades, Op. 10, are lyrical piano pieces written by Johannes Brahms during his youth. They were dated 1854 and were dedicated to his friend Julius Otto Grimm. Their composition coincided with the beginning of the composer's lifelong affection for the pianist and composer Clara Schumann, who was helping Brahms launch his career. Frédéric Chopin had written the last of his ballades only 12 years earlier, but Brahms approached the genre differently from Chopin, choosing to take its origin in narrative poetry more literally.

== Music ==
Brahms's ballades are arranged in two pairs of two, the members of each pair being in parallel keys. The first ballade was inspired by a Scottish poem "Edward" found in a collection Stimmen der Völker in ihren Liedern [Voices of the Peoples in Their Songs] compiled by Johann Gottfried Herder. It is also one of the best examples of Brahms's bardic or Ossianic style; its open fifths, octaves, and simple triadic harmonies are supposed to evoke the sense of a mythological past.

1. Andante

1. D minor. Andante
2. D major. Andante
3. B minor. Intermezzo. Allegro
4. B major. Andante con moto

The tonal center of each ballade conveys an interconnectedness between the four pieces: the first three each include the key signature of the ballade that follows it somewhere as a tonal center, and the fourth ends in the key signature of D major/B minor despite cadencing in B major.

Brahms returned to the wordless ballade form in writing the third of the Six Pieces for Piano, Op. 118. His Op. 75 vocal duets titled "Ballads and Romances" include a setting of the poem "Edward"—the same that inspired Op. 10, No. 1.
