= The Bonny Hind =

1771 traditional song

"The Bonny Hind" (Roud 205, Child 50) is a traditional English-language folk song.

== Synopsis ==
A squire persuades a maiden to lie with him. Afterward, she asks his name, and he reveals that he is a lord's son. She calls him a liar: she is that lord's daughter. The horror-struck son reveals that he was long at sea. She stabs herself to death, and he buries her. He goes home and grieves for a "bonny hind" whatever his father can do to distract him.

== Recordings ==
- June Tabor, Abyssinians (1983)
- Ewan MacColl, Blood & Roses Volume 4 (1986)
- Martin Carthy, Signs of Life (1998)
- Michael John Harris & Martyn Bates, Murder Ballads (Incest Songs) (1998)

== See also ==
Ballads on a similar theme:

- "The Bonnie Banks o' Fordie"
- "Sheath and Knife"
- "The King's Dochter Lady Jean"
- "Lizie Wan"
