= The King's Dochter Lady Jean =

Traditional song

"The King's Dochter Lady Jean" (Roud 39, Child 52), also called "The King's Daughter," "Fair Rosie Ann," or "Queen Jane", is an English-language folk song.

== Synopsis ==
The King's youngest Daughter, Jane, is sitting in her bower one day when she is overcome with the urge to gather nuts from the King's forest. She goes to the forest to do so when a forester appears, and commands her not to pick nuts in the forest without his permission. Jane asserts that she does not need his permission, at which point the forester rapes her. Jane says that he will pay dearly for raping the king's daughter, at which point the forester reveals that he is the king's son. He had been at sea for many years and so did not recognize Jane as his sister. Jane wished that they had never met and she ends the tale by hoping that she dies after giving birth to the baby they have conceived. In some variants, he kills her; in most, she goes home, and is tasked by her family for why she ails, and she and her brother both die when they meet there.

== Variants ==
Other ballads on this theme include "Sheath and Knife", "The Bonny Hind", and "Lizie Wan".

The opening section parallels that of "Hind Etin" and "Tam Lin".

== See also ==
- The Bonnie Banks o Fordie
- List of the Child Ballads
