= Shep Ginandes =

American medical practitioner, folk singer and song collector (born 1928)

Shepard Coleman "Shep" Ginandes (born June 7, 1928) is an American medical practitioner, folk singer and song collector.

== Life and career ==
Ginandes was born in New York City and was educated at Harvard Medical School, graduating in 1951. During the early 1950s, he worked as a US Army doctor, and traveled the world picking up folk songs, which he began performing in Boston. His repertoire included songs in a wide range of languages including Welsh, French, German and Russian.

His first recordings, Songs Of Delinquency, were issued in 1952 on George Wein's Storyville label, and included a version of "Willie the Weeper", later covered by Dave Van Ronk. In 1953, Ginandes released three 10-inch albums on Elektra Records – British Traditional Ballads in America, There was a Little Tree... American Folksongs for Children, and French Traditional Songs. He released a further set of recordings on Elektra, Shep Ginandes Sings Folksongs, in 1958; the album included one of the earliest recordings of the traditional English folk song "Mattie Groves". The 1958 recordings were apparently produced by Ginandes himself, and Tom Lehrer later credited Ginandes with advice on recording his own material. In 1961, Ginandes released Dogwood Soup: Folksongs for Children on the Pathways of Sound label.

He did not record thereafter, turning to full-time practice as a child psychiatrist. In 1968 he set up a non-residential program offering group psychotherapy and creative arts education for young people, in Concord, Massachusetts, and published two books, The School We Have (1968), and Coming Home: How Parents and Grown Children Can Confront Each Other More Openly (1976). He later practised in Honolulu, Hawaii. His registration allowing him to prescribe controlled substances was revoked in 2010 after he was convicted of distributing drugs including methadone and morphine not for a legitimate medical purpose.
