= Julius Otto Grimm =

German composer and conductor (1827–1903)

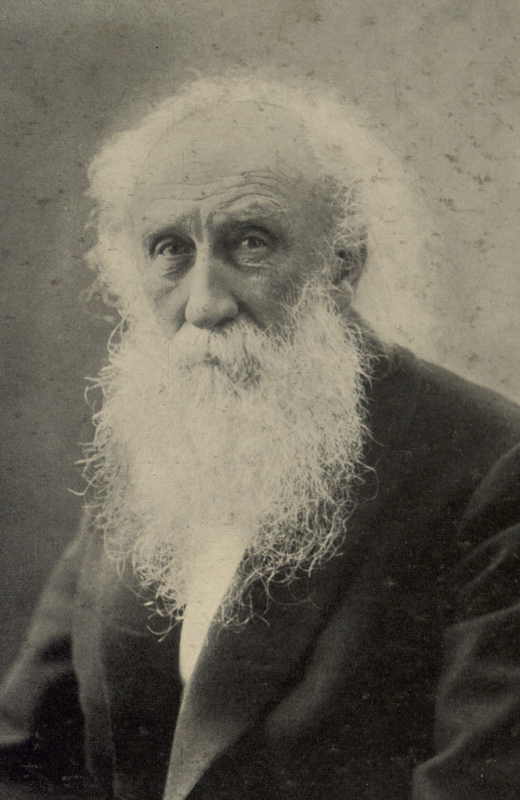
Grimm c. 1900

Julius Otto Grimm (6 March 1827 – 7 December 1903) was a German composer, conductor and musician who spent the majority of his professional life in Westphalia. He is most-often remembered today as one of the best friends of Johannes Brahms, whom he met in Leipzig in 1853. Brahms went on to dedicate his 4 Ballades, Op. 10 to Grimm in 1854.

== Life and career ==
Grimm was born in Pernau, Livonia, now Pärnu, Estonia. After studying philology and philosophy at the University of Tartu (then the University of Dorpat), concluding his exams in 1848, Grimm began his career and avocation as a tutor in Saint Petersburg. His first compositions were published around this time. From 1851 to 1852, he pursued further studies in Dresden.

In 1855, Grimm took the position of professor of music and choral conductor in Göttingen. In 1860, he accepted the post of conductor of the Musikverein (music association) of Münster. During his 40-year-long career in Münster, he received many honors and appointments, including an honorary doctorate in 1897.

At his death in Münster, "hundreds of letters from Madame Schumann, Brahms and Dr. Joachim" were found in Grimm's possession. In addition to this collection of correspondence, he owned several of Brahms' manuscripts, which were (presumably) gifted to him. These included Brahms' first Piano Sonata Op. 1, a song from his Op. 3, and his unfinished Missa Canonica, WoO 18.

Grimm's compositions include a violin sonata in A major, three orchestral suites, and a symphony in D minor published in 1875. One of his suites, Op. 10 "in the Form of a Canon", is positively mentioned and described in some detail in a review (of a performance by the Boston Symphony Orchestra conducted by Theodore Thomas, in March 1869) in American music critic John Sullivan Dwight's journal.

== Works ==
=== Orchestral ===
- Orchestral Suite No. 1 in the Form of a Canon, Op. 10
- Orchestral Suite No. 2 in the Form of a Canon, Op. 16
- Two Marches, Op. 17
- Symphony in D minor, Op. 19
  1. Sostenuto – Allegro
  2. Trauermarsch: Andante
  3. Scherzo: Presto
  4. Finale: Allegro vivace
- Orchestral Suite No. 3, Op. 25

=== Chamber music ===
- Violin Sonata in A major, Op. 14

=== Piano music ===
- Five Piano Pieces, Op. 2
- Three Elegies, Op. 6
- Two Scherzos for Four-Hand Piano
- Four Piano Pieces in freier canonischer Weise

=== Choral music ===
- An die Musik for Soloists, Choir, and Orchestra, Op. 12
- Kaiserhymne for Male Choir and Orchestra, Op. 21
- Zum Geburtsfeste des Kaisers for Male Choir and Wind Orchestra, Op. 27
- Abendfeier
- Frühlingslied

=== Lieder ===
- Sechs Lieder, Op. 1
- Sechs Lieder, Op. 3
- Sechs Lieder, Op. 11
- Sechs Lieder, Op. 15
- Deutsche Volkslieder
