= Lizie Wan =

Traditional song

"Lizie Wan" (Roud 234, Child 51), also called "Lucy Wan" or "Fair Lizzie", is an English-language murder ballad.

== Synopsis ==
The heroine (called variously Lizie, Rosie or Lucy) is pregnant with her brother's child. Her brother murders her. He tries to pass off the blood as that of some animal he had killed (his greyhound, his falcon, his horse), but in the end must admit that he murdered her. He sets sail in a ship, never to return.

== Parallels ==
This ballad, in several variants, contains most of the ballad "Edward", Child 13.

Other ballads on this theme include "Sheath and Knife", "The King's Dochter Lady Jean", and "The Bonny Hind".

== In popular culture ==
The Ballad of Lizie Wan was the inspiration for the title song from English recording artist Kate Bush's album The Kick Inside. It is directly referenced in an early demo recording of the song in the second verse: "You and me on the bobbing knee / Welling eyes from identifying with Lizie Wan's story." The final version of the song replaces the direct reference and describes the ballad as "old mythology."

A dark ambient version of the song, titled "Lucy Wan", appeared on the 1993 album Murder Ballads (Drift) by Martyn Bates and Mick Harris. Oli Steadman included it on his song collection "365 Days Of Folk".

== See also ==
- The King's Dochter Lady Jean
- List of the Child Ballads
