= The Outside Track =

Celtic musical group

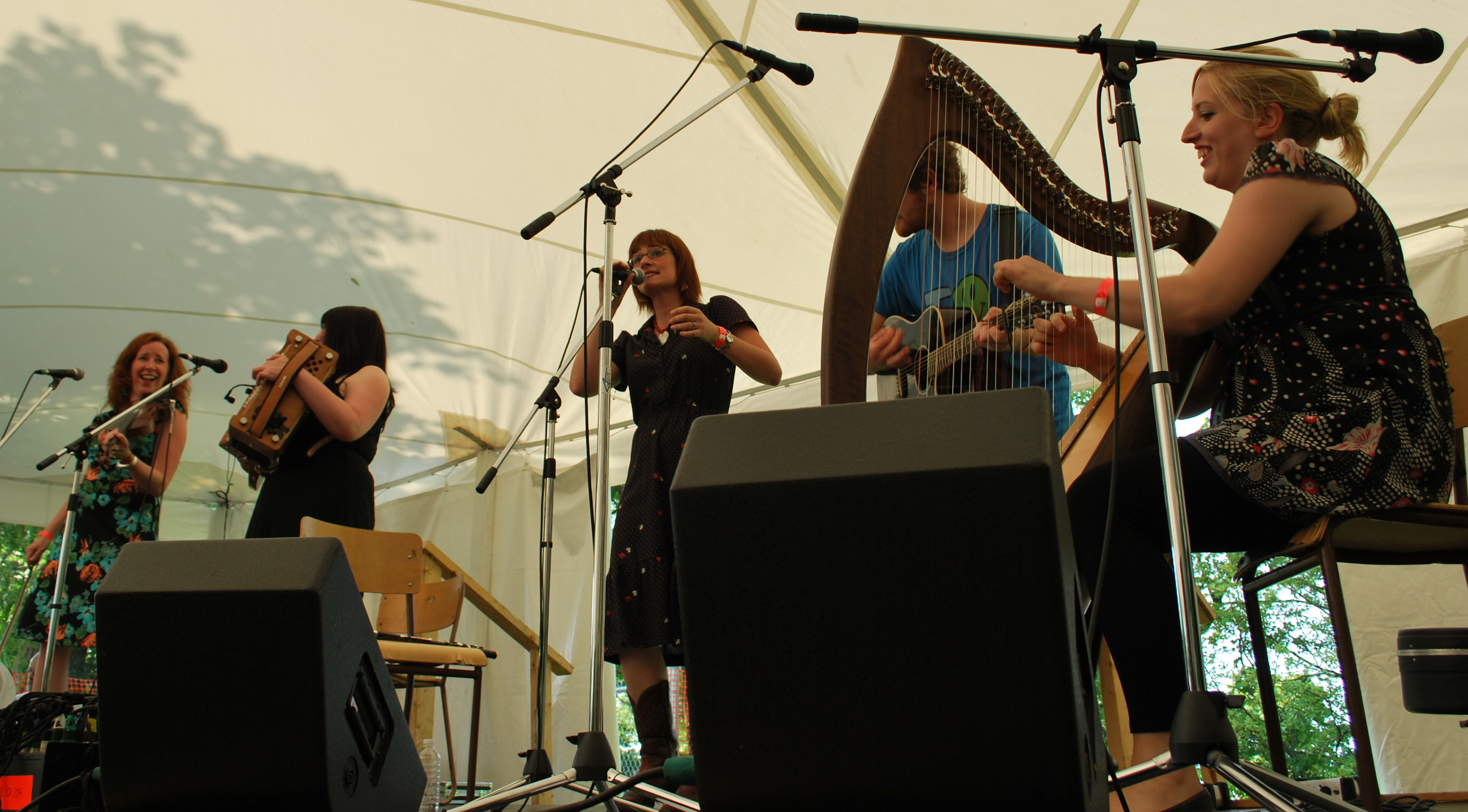
- The Outside Track at the 2009 Goderich Celtic Roots Festival

Background information
- Origin: Limerick, Ireland
- Genres: Pan Celtic
- Years active: 2005–present
- Members: Mairi Rankin; Teresa Horgan; Fiona Black; Ailie Robertson; Michael Ferrie
- Past members: Aoife Scott; Norah Rendell; Cillian O'Dalaigh; Fiona Black; Ailie Robertson; Ivonne Hernandez
- Website: http://www.theoutsidetrack.com

The Outside Track is a Pan Celtic group that performs Scots, Irish and Cape Breton songs and stepdance. Members of the group include Ailie Robertson, who has won a LiveIreland Music Award and was a BBC Radio Scotland Young Traditional Musician finalist, and Fiona Black, who was a winner of the BBC’s Fame Academy, as well as Mairi Rankin, a relative of the Rankin family from Mabou, Cape Breton. As a group they won ‘Best Group’ in the 2012 LiveIreland Music Award, a ‘Tradition In Review’ award, and was nominated for the 2013 MG Alba Scots Traditional Music Award. For their album Flash Company, they also won the German Radio Critics' Prize.

== Discography ==
- Christmas Star (2022)
- Rise Up (2018)
- Light up the Dark (2015)
- Flash Company (2013)
- The Mountain Road (2012)
- Curious Things Given Wings (2010)
- Self-Titled (2007)
