= P. W. Halton =

P. W. Halton (22 April 1841 – 7 June 1909), was an Irish-born conductor. He is best known for his long tenure as music director and conductor of D'Oyly Carte Opera Company touring companies during the original runs and early revivals of the Savoy Operas, including many of the New York premieres.

== Life and career ==
Patrick William Halton was born in Mullingar, Ireland, and died in Manchester, England. For nearly 25 years, Halton served as one of D'Oyly Carte's leading provincial musical directors. Halton was the father of Frederick J. Halton, the author of The Gilbert & Sullivan Operas: A Concordance (New York, Bass, 1935).

In the early to mid-1870s, Halton moved to London and worked in a music store, playing the organ in a local church, and giving music lessons. He also conducted at various music halls during this time. In 1876, he was engaged as a conductor by the Theatre Royal, Manchester.

=== Early years and premieres ===
In December 1879, D'Oyly Carte hired Halton in Hastings as music director for one of its touring companies, presenting H.M.S. Pinafore. In 1880 he toured with Pinafore and The Sorcerer, along with shorter companion pieces, and in December 1880, the company began to play The Pirates of Penzance. Among the companion pieces included on this tour was Halton's own composition Six and Six, a one-act operetta with words by B. T. Hughes.

In September 1881, Halton travelled to America to music direct Patience, at the Standard Theatre in New York, until March 1882. During the last month he also conducted Henry Pottinger Stephens and Edward Solomon's Claude Duval, alternating with Patience. He then returned to England to music direct Patience on tour until December 1883, together with Rip Van Winkle. Next, beginning in February 1884, was Princess Ida. Then, beginning in February 1885, Trial by Jury and Sorcerer were played in repertory with Princess Ida.

Back in New York, at the Fifth Avenue Theatre, Halton music directed the American premiere of The Mikado from August 1885 to April 1886. He then toured with Pinafore and The Mikado, first in England and then took in Germany and Austria, until January 1887. He then returned to New York and the Fifth Avenue Theatre, with most of the same principals, for the premiere of Ruddigore, which ran until April. He was back to Germany, Austria, the Netherlands and then Britain with Patience and The Mikado until December 1887.

In 1888, Halton toured with a repertory consisting at various times of Pinafore, Patience, The Mikado and Pirates, until October. On 1 November 1888, he began a tour of The Yeomen of the Guard, which ran for over a year. In January 1890, Halton was back in New York music directing the ill-starred premiere of The Gondoliers at the Park Theatre. The weak cast meant a disaster, and Carte and Halton assembled a new cast for a re-launch on 18 February at Palmer's Theatre, which was better received.

=== Later years ===
Halton was called back to England to begin touring in March 1890 with The Gondoliers until December. After this, they added shows in repertory, including The Mikado in December 1890 and Yeomen in January 1891. On 4 September 1891, he conducted The Mikado for Queen Victoria at Balmoral Castle – an assignment that the patriotic Irishman accepted grudgingly. In October 1891, Iolanthe was added to the company's repertory, and from January to July 1892 they also included The Nautch Girl. The company continued to add more shows: Patience in August 1892, Pirates in May 1893, Pinafore and Trial in January 1894, The Sorcerer in April 1895, the curtain raiser Cox and Box in May, and Princess Ida in December 1895. The repertoire was now eleven, and the tour continued through 1896.

In late November 1896, Halton sailed for South Africa for an ambitious tour through June 1897. It embraced all the Gilbert and Sullivan operas Halton had been conducting, except Princess Ida, and also included Utopia, Limited and The Grand Duke. Halton toured Britain from December 1897 with most of the Gilbert and Sullivan operas plus, briefly, His Majesty. ver the next six-and-a-half years, with Halton as their musical director, the same touring company played all the G&S operas except Ruddigore and The Grand Duke plus, in 1900, The Rose of Persia. In 1903 he toured again with the Gilbert and Sullivan repertory and the one-act opera Bob by François Cellier and Cunningham Bridgeman.

Halton retired on 18 June 1904 and died in 1909 at the age of 68.
