= Charles Hodge Mackie =

Scottish artist (1862–1920)

- Born: 1862; Aldershot, Hampshire, England
- Died: 12 July 1920 (aged 57–58); Edinburgh, Scotland
- Education: Royal Scottish Academy
- Movement: Colourist
- Spouse: Anne MacDonald Walls

Charles Hodge Mackie (1862–1920) was a Scottish artist. He was a co-founder, and the first president, of the Society of Scottish Artists in 1900.

== Life ==
Mackie was born in Aldershot, England, the son of an army captain from Duddingston, Edinburgh. His family moved back to Edinburgh in 1866 when he was 4 years old. He briefly attended the University of Edinburgh as a medical student. He then studied art at the Royal Scottish Academy School where William McTaggart was one of his tutors. At the beginning of his career, Mackie worked in Kirkcudbright, Scotland. His first exhibition of a Kirkcudbright picture was of Kirkcudbright Town in 1884 at the Royal Society of Arts. In 1893 he worked with Patrick Geddes, creating murals for an urban renewal project at Edinburgh's Ramsay Garden.

In 1890 he was living and operating a studio from 15 Queen Street, one of the best addresses in the New Town of Edinburgh. By 1895 he had moved to smaller premises at 2 William Street in the West End. Soon after this he moved to Coltbridge Studio, a more rural location on the edge of the Water of Leith in the Roseburn district of west Edinburgh.

In 1895 and 1896 he contributed black and white woodblock prints to illustrate the four issues of The Evergreen: A Northern Seasonal published by Patrick Geddes and Colleagues and designed the embossed leather covers for each of the volumes.

He died in Edinburgh on 12 July 1920 and was buried in Warriston Cemetery in the north of the city.

== French influence ==
In 1892, Mackie and his wife honeymooned in France, where he befriended Paul Sérusier. Sérusier later introduced him to Paul Gauguin and other artists within the Pont-Aven School, making Mackie one of the first British artists to meet Gauguin. These connections resulted in a strong French influence in Mackie's works, and it was Gauguin who convinced Mackie to use Japanese oak blocks for printing, rather than cut linoleum. However, by the beginning of the 20th century, Mackie had adopted a more conventional impressionist style.

== Memberships ==
In 1900, Mackie was a co-founder, and the first president, of the Society of Scottish Artists. In 1901, he was a founding member of the Staithes Art Club and subsequently contributed work to Yorkshire Union of Artists exhibitions. He was a member of the Royal Scottish Society of Painters in Watercolour and involved in the establishment of the Scottish Modern Arts Association in 1906. He became a full member of the Royal Scottish Academy in 1917.

== Associates ==
Mackie became close with many Pont-Aven School artists during his trips to France. He also had a close friendship with artist Laura Knight, whom he had met at an artists' colony in Staithes in North Yorkshire around 1900. In 1908, he travelled to Venice with fellow Scottish artist Adam Bruce Thomson. His French style also had an influence on some of the Glasgow Boys.

== Exhibitions ==
Exhibitions of Mackie's work during his lifetime.

- Royal Academy of Arts
- Royal Scottish Academy
- Royal Scottish Society of Painters in Watercolour
- Royal Hibernian Academy
- Royal Institution
- Royal Glasgow Institute of the Fine Arts
- Thomas Agnew & Sons
- Colnaghi
- The International Society
- Walker Art Gallery
- Manchester Art Gallery
- New English Art Club
- Yorkshire Union of Artists

== Family ==
Mackie was married to Anne MacDonald. Their son Donald MacDonald Mackie (1897-1970) was an architect.
