= Penguin Eggs =

Studio album by Nic Jones
- Released: June 1980
- Studio: Livingston Studios
- Genre: English folk
- Length: 45:14
- Label: Topic; Shanachie
- Producer: Tony Engle

Nic Jones chronology
From the Devil to a Stranger (1978)	Penguin Eggs (1980)

Penguin Eggs is the fifth and final studio album by English folk musician and singer Nic Jones, released by Topic Records in 1980. After establishing himself as a sought after figure on the British folk revival scene, Jones recorded Penguin Eggs with producer Tony Engle; it consists largely of traditional folk songs arranged by Jones, but also includes three contemporary tracks by other writers (Harry Robertson and Paul Metsers). Exemplified throughout the album is Jones' intricate acoustic guitar playing style, characterised by a distinctive, percussive plucking style and use of open tunings. He also plays fiddle on one song, while he is joined on many tracks by Tony Hall on melodeon and Bridget Danby on recorder.

Released to critical acclaim, the album was awarded Melody Maker Folk Album of the Year in 1980. It was ultimately Jones' last album, as a car crash in 1982 greatly restricted his ability to perform. In the years after its release, the album gained a cult following and has been hailed as a masterpiece and influence on contemporary folk musicians. AllMusic has described the album as "one of those rare records where not just every song, but each instrumental part is worth hearing". English folk musician Kate Rusby states that Penguin Eggs is her favourite album of all time, while Stewart Lee has ranked it among his favourite albums. It was named the second best folk album of all time in a 2001 BBC poll.

== Background ==
Folk musician and singer Nic Jones first emerged in the late 1960s as a member of the trio The Halliard, who achieved a Spanish hit with "The Irish in Me" but soon split up when its members fancied different career paths. Jones began a solo career, taking strong influence from Martin Carthy, whose percussive style of guitar playing was adopted by Jones for his own work. Jones signed to Bill and Helen Leader's record label Trailer, who released his first album Ballads and Songs (1970), which consisted of traditional tunes that highlighted Jones' instrumental skill and "mastery of the long ballad". Trailer also issued his following albums Nic Jones (1971) and the much later Noah Ark's Trap (1977) and From the Devil a Stranger (1978), while throughout the decade, Jones had established himself as one of the British folk revival's most acclaimed artists, and one of the scene's most sought after solo performers.

Part of Jones' style was regularly writing his own material and discreetly passing it off as traditional folk music. This was consistent with Jones "turning his back" on his audience if he felt they were not paying attention, where in such instances he would sing gibberish or play the same song two times in a row to see if people would notice, which he later claimed they didn't. Jones said: "People didn't want me to write my own songs, they only wanted to hear traditional material. Other times I'd rewrite traditional songs or stick in new verses. Nobody ever knew." His 1977 album Noah's Ark Trap gave many indications as to the direction Jones would take on Penguin Eggs. After leaving the Trailer label, Jones recorded Penguin Eggs at Livingston Recording Studios in late 1979. It was produced by Tony Engle, who also designed the album's packaging, and engineered by Nic Kinsey. Billy Kinsley also helped engineer.

== Music ==
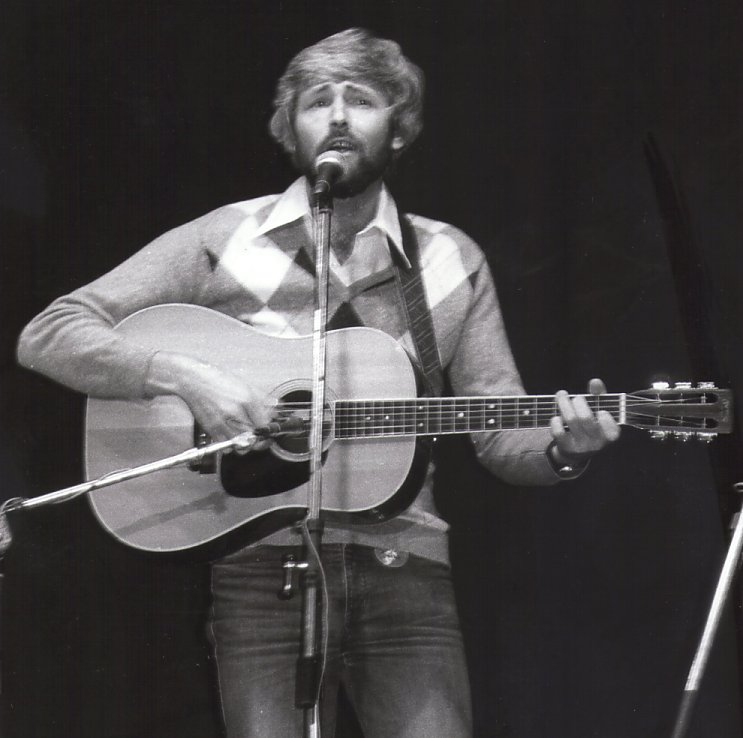
Paul Metsers (pictured 1981) who wrote "Farewell to the Gold".

Penguin Eggs is a work of the English folk revival, and consists largely of traditional songs, English, Irish and Scottish, and one Irish instrumental, "Planxty Davis". The instrumentation is entirely acoustic and dominated by Jones' acoustic guitar. The singer's virtuoso acoustic guitar playing on the album is elegant, brawny and lyrical. As with Jones' previous work, an integral aspect to his intricate playing style is the recurring percussive sound achieved by striking downwards using the middle or ring fingers on his right hand onto damped bass strings near or above the guitar bridge, a technique similar to the 'frailing' of a banjo. His modern guitar arrangements on Penguin Eggs display a contemporary feel, and he makes inventive use of progressive open tunings on the album, including DADGAD, though he generally preferred tunings in C and G.

Although Jones' guitar work forms the basis on the album, musical support is provided on several tracks by Tony Hall on melodeon and Bridget Danby on recorder. Jones himself also plays the fiddle on "Barrack Street". According to Bruce Eder of AllMusic, Jones' singing, "some of the most expressive to emerge from the English folk revival", bears a richness that recalls young Martin Carthy but also hints of a roughness that is reminiscent of A.L. Lloyd and Paul Clayton, while the harmony singing from Danby and Dave Burland recalls several 1960s and 70s British folk rock bands like Fairport Convention and Steeleye Span, though the purely acoustic instrumentation on Penguin Eggs separates the album from those bands.

The album opens with Jones' arrangement of the English folk ballad "Canadee-I-O", a recording cited as "iconic" by the BBC and the Guardian. It is followed by "The Drowned Lovers", an interpretation of the Child ballad "The Mother's Malison". Jones later found the album version of "The Drowned Lovers" to be inferior to the harder-hitting version he began playing live in the few years after the album's release, which bears a different arrangement. The following two songs "The Humpback Whale" (originally "Ballina Whalers") and "The Little Pot Stove" (originally "Wee Pot Stove") are both compositions by the Scots-Australian whaler and singer Harry Robertson, although uncredited ("The Humpback Whale" is listed as "trad./arr. Jones") and were originally recorded by Robertson on his 1971 album Whale Chasing Men; they deal with aspects of whaling in the subtropics (off Byron Bay in Australia) and South Georgia in subantarctic waters, respectively, the latter song also providing the phrase used for the album title ("Salt fish and whale meat sausage, fresh penguin eggs a treat"). The Celtic song "Courting Is a Pleasure" concerns "a broken heart and emigration to America". It features subtle counterpoint guitar lines that complement the lead vocals. The Guardian also cited his arrangement of "The Flandyke Shore" as iconic. The album's closing song, "Farewell to the Gold", was written by New Zealand-born folk singer Paul Metsers, who moved to the United Kingdom to establish himself on the UK's folk club scene the same year Penguin Eggs was released.

== Release and reception ==
Penguin Eggs was released by Topic Records in June 1980, reaching number 71 on the UK Albums Chart. The album received critical acclaim, and Melody Maker named it their "Folk Album of the Year", as did Folk Roots. Reissued by Topic Records on CD in 1991, Penguin Eggs has for many years been the only easily available Nic Jones studio album, and with the exception of several compilations released after Jones' retirement, Penguin Eggs remains the only Nic Jones CD available with endorsement from Jones' family. An audiophile, 200g heavyweight LP reissue of the album was issued by Three Black Feathers in 2009, while a 180g LP edition was released by Vinyl180 in 2017, with the first 500 copies being on white vinyl. Record Collector ranked the original LP edition of the album at number 41 on its list of the "top 50 most collectable records". The Telegraph said that, while Jones' first three albums from 1970 and 1971 have not been reissued for many years, Penguin Eggs itself is a "neglected classic".

Mojo wrote in hindsight that there were strong clues on Penguin Eggs that Jones was "heading into bold territory". By 1982, Jones was fully embracing contemporary song and, strongly influenced by Bob Marley, even contemplated making folk-reggae fusions. However, Penguin Eggs was ultimately Jones' last studio album; on 28 February 1982, Jones' career was cut short when he was involved in a serious road traffic accident. Returning home by car after a gig at Glossop Folk Club, a tired Jones inadvertently drove into a lorry pulling out of Whittlesea brickworks. He suffered serious injuries, including many broken bones and brain damage, and required intensive care treatment and hospitalisation for a total of eight months. His injuries left him with permanent physical co-ordination problems, unable to play the guitar as well as before, and no longer able to play the fiddle at all. He returned to the stage in 2010.

=== Retrospective reviews ===
Professional ratings
Review scores
Source	Rating
AllMusic	4.5/5 stars
Encyclopedia of Popular Music	5/5 stars

In a very positive retrospective review, Bruce Eder of AllMusic named Penguin Eggs an "Album Pick" and called it Jones' magnum opus. He wrote that the album "stands in a virtual class by itself – a folk record built on playing of such virtuosity that anyone who enjoys guitar, of any type or style, should hear it; a body of traditional songs played with an immediacy and urgency that transcends any dry notions of scholarship; and a record that stands astride the opposing virtues of youth and antiquity, in its execution and source, respectively." He felt the musicianship makes the album "truly special" and "alluring to modern listeners" and noted: "Penguin Eggs is one of those rare records where not just every song, but each instrumental part is worth hearing." Journalist Jon Dennis of The Guardian wrote in retrospect:

"Nic Jones's Penguin Eggs enthralls from the outset through the sheer force of Jones's musicianship. It's an album of traditional songs, but very much alive and in the moment due to Jones's astonishing acoustic guitar playing. Bob Dylan covered 'Canadee-i-o' years after Penguin Eggs, but it's hard to imagine anyone bettering Jones's rendition."

Penguin Eggs is listed as Jones' finest album in the Rough Guides book World Music: Africa, Europe and the Middle East, where it is referred to as a "seminal album from the English revival" which marks Jones' "sudden transformation from accomplished but more or less straightforward interpreter of folk song, to innovative arranger and intricate performer. It remains a classic." In The Encyclopedia of Popular Music, writer Colin Larkin gave the album a perfect score and wrote that the album contains "some excellent performances", including "The Humpback Whale". Julie Henigan, in her book on DADGAD tunings, praised felt Jones used open tunings "inventively and with great flair", and felt "his approach to setting traditional music is edifying". The album is listed in the accompanying book to the Topic Records 70 year anniversary boxed set Three Score and Ten as one of their classic records with "The Humpback Whale" as the first track on the first CD in the set.

== Legacy ==
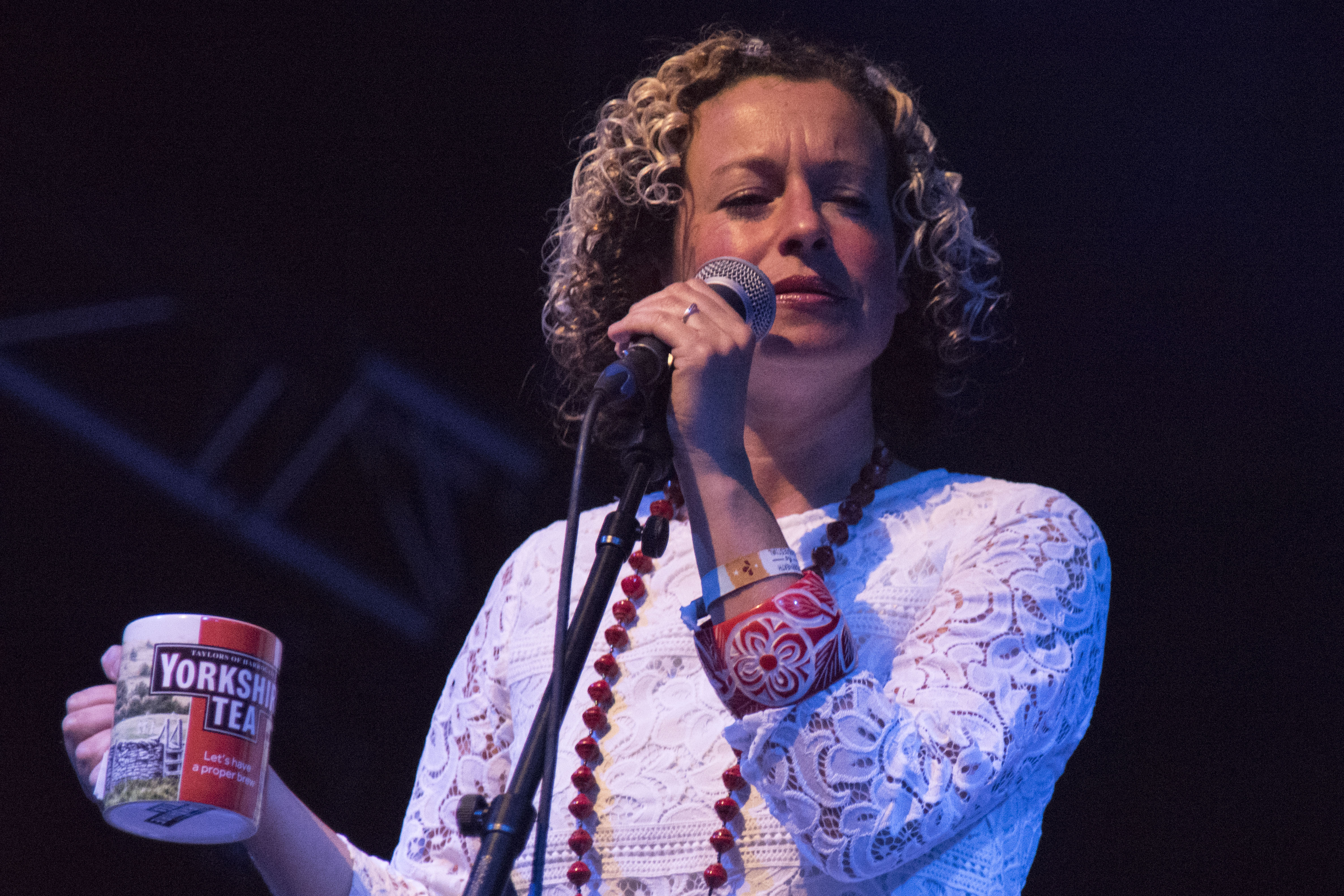
Penguin Eggs has been cited as an influence by modern folk musicians, including Kate Rusby, who named it her favourite album ever.

Colin Irwin of The Guardian called Penguin Eggs "groundbreaking", writing that it took British folk music "to a new level, with Jones channelling his inner rock psyche into the unlikely format of a solo singer playing mostly traditional songs on an acoustic guitar." The album has since repeatedly been cited as an influence by folk and pop singers, including English folk singers Eliza Carthy and Kate Rusby. Describing the album's enduring influence, Irwin noted that while British folk music was "largely barren" in the decades following Jones' accident, a new generation of folk musicians eventually emerged who "all appeared to carry a copy of the one Nic Jones album they could easily get their hands on, Penguin Eggs", with singers such as Jon Boden, Jim Moray and Seth Lakeman citing Jones as an influence. Stuart Maconie reflected: "Before folk became hip with preening trendies, and indeed at the height of punk rock, the now wheelchair-bound Jones [...] made this heartbreaking, plangent album of originals that sound ancient."

English folk musician Kate Rusby stated that Penguin Eggs is her favourite album of all time. Comedian and writer Stewart Lee, and songwriter and artist Darren Hayman, have both ranked Penguin Eggs among their thirteen favourite albums of all time in lists for The Quietus. Singer Peter Case called Penguin Eggs "one of the finest acoustic albums ever made". Bob Dylan recorded "Canadee-I-O" for his album Good as I Been to You (1992), imitating Jones' arrangement of the song, though he did not give him credit in the album's liner notes. "The Flandyke Shore" has also been recorded by Joni Mitchell. In contrast to its glowing reputation, Jones looks back on Penguin Eggs with muted praise, saying in 2012: "It's all right, but people only go on about it because I wasn't around after that. I was interested in a more modern sound and I think I could have come up with a more interesting record after Penguin Eggs. Me having the smash-up made it more popular."

Penguin Eggs was named the 25th best ever folk album in the 1994 book The Guinness All Time Top 1000 Albums, which presented lists of the greatest albums by genre using over 200,000 votes cast by informed music lovers. In a 2001 poll conducted by Mike Harding of BBC Radio 2, Penguin Eggs was named the second best folk album of all time, after Fairport Convention's Liege & Lief (1969). In 2004, Observer Music Monthly ranked the album 79th in their critics' poll of the "Greatest British Albums". Of those whose lists were featured, Stuart Maconie named it the 7th best British album. Journalist Peter Paphides named it the 7th best English folk album ever in 2005, saying it "has deservedly continued to feed Jones’ legend". He praised "Jones’s plangent delivery and exquisite harmonies". The album is featured in the 2007 book The Mojo Collection, listing what its authors deems to be the 1,000 best albums ever, and in Uncut magazine's 2017 "Unlimited Record Guide", listing the "greatest music of the last 60 years".

== Track listing ==
The detail after the title below is either the composer's name or references from the three major numbering schemes for traditional folk songs, the Roud Folk Song Index, Child Ballad Numbers and the Laws Numbers.

Nic Jones sings on all tracks, and plays guitar on all tracks except track 6.

No.	Title	Accompaniment	Length
1.	"Canadee-I-O" (Roud 309)		5:58
2.	"The Drowned Lovers" (Roud 91; Child 216)	Tony Hall (melodeon), Bridget Danby (recorder)	6:31
3.	"The Humpback Whale" (Harry Robertson)		6:04
4.	"The Little Pot Stove" (Harry Robertson)	Tony Hall (melodeon), Bridget Danby (recorder and vocals) and Dave Burland (vocals)	5:37
5.	"Courting Is a Pleasure" (Roud 454)	Bridget Danby (recorder)	5:22
6.	"Barrack Street" (Roud 1902; Laws K42)	Nic Jones (fiddle), Tony Hall (Melodeon), Bridget Danby (recorder)	4:28
7.	"Planxty Davis" (Instrumental)		2:51
8.	"The Flandyke Shore" (Roud 2636)	Tony Hall (melodeon)	2:53
9.	"Farewell to the Gold" (Paul Metsers)	Bridget Danby (vocals) and Dave Burland (vocals)	5:17

== Personnel ==
- Nic Jones – vocals, guitar, fiddle, arrangements
- Dave Burland – harmony vocals
- Bridget Danby – recorder, harmony vocals
- Tony Hall – melodeon
- Nic Kinsey – engineering
- Billy Kinsley – engineering
- Tony Engle – production
