= Ballade No. 2 (Liszt) =

Composition for piano by Franz Liszt

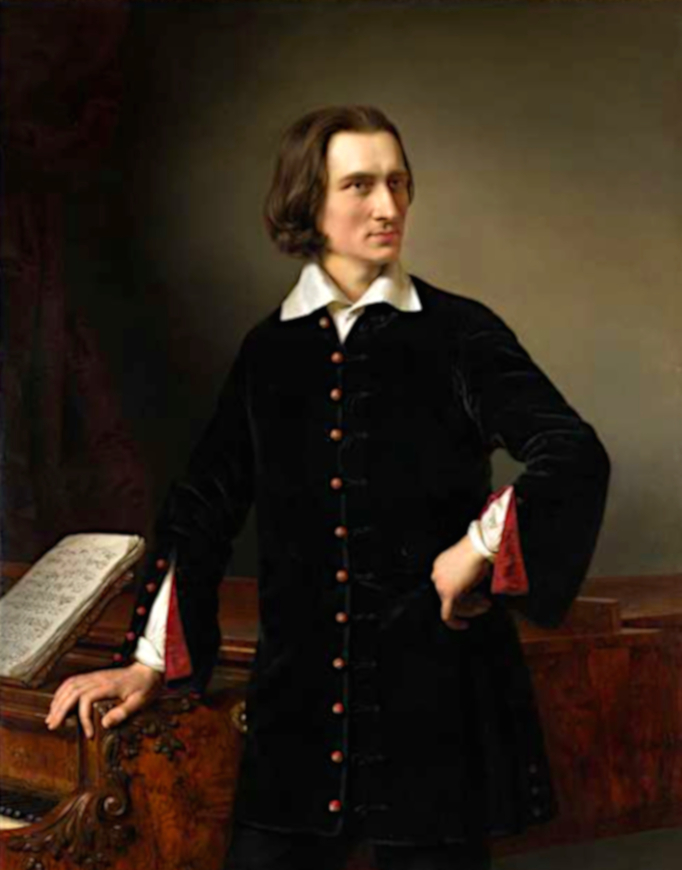
Franz Liszt, portrait by Hungarian painter Miklós Barabás, 1847

The Ballade No. 2 in B minor, S. 171, is a piano composition by Franz Liszt, written in 1853. It is dedicated to Charles Alexander, who was Liszt's protector and became Grand Duke of Weimar in 1853.

The first version of the ballade, identified as S. 170a, was first published in 1854. It's possible Liszt did not intend the original version to be published; as he quickly revised the work and published it again; this revised version is now identified as S. 171. The biggest difference of the revised version was to expand the final Presto section, and end the work with a pianissimo series of subdued chords. The sole surviving manuscript is a working holograph of the revision, held by the Juilliard Manuscript Collection.

Claudio Arrau, who studied under Liszt's disciple Martin Krause, maintained that the Ballade was based on the Greek myth of Hero and Leander, with the piece's chromatic ostinati representing the sea: "You really can perceive how the journey turns more and more difficult each time. In the fourth night he drowns. Next, the last pages are a transfiguration".

The ballad is based largely on two themes: a broad opening melody underpinned by menacing chromatic rumbles in the lower register of the keyboard, and a luminous ensuing chordal meditation. These themes are repeated a half-step lower; then march-like triplet-rhythms unleash a flood of virtuosity. Eventually, Liszt transforms the opening melody into a rocking major-key cantabile and reiterates this with ever-more grandiose exultation. The luminous chords provide a contemplative close.
