= Master Kilby =

Traditional song

Song by Harry Richards
- Written: Unknown
- Genre: English folk music
- Composer: Arranged by Benjamin Britten
- Lyricist: Unknown

Master Kilby (Roud 1434) is a traditional English folk song. It was collected by Cecil Sharp and Maud Karpeles in 1909. It has been arranged by Benjamin Britten

== Recordings ==
- John Wesley Harding; Trad Arr Jones
- Nic Jones: From The Devil To A Stranger (1978), also on Unearthed - Nic Jones (released 2001)
- Anne Hills and Cindy Mangsen Never Grow Old 1994
- Kate Rusby: When They All Looked Up (2025)
