= Elegy (Elgar) =

1909 composition by Edward Elgar

Elegy, Op. 58
- by Edward Elgar
- Elgar's manuscript of the Elegy, 1909.
- Dedication: Robert Hadden
- Recorded: 29 August 1933
- Duration: Between 3 minutes 25 seconds and 4 minutes 20 seconds

Premiere
- Date: 13 July 1909
- Location: Mansion House, London, U.K.

Elegy, Op. 58 is a short piece for string orchestra by Edward Elgar, composed in 1909. It was written in response to a request for a short piece to commemorate deceased members of the Worshipful Company of Musicians. The work was composed within a month of the death of his close friend August Jaeger and may reflect Elgar's grief at his loss. Dedicated to Robert Hadden, the work was premiered privately at the Mansion House in July 1909 and is still performed annually at St Paul's Cathedral.

== Background and first performance ==
By 1909 Elgar had achieved success as a composer after years of obscurity. He had been knighted in 1904 and among other honours he was an honorary freeman of the Worshipful Company of Musicians. The junior warden of the company, the Rev Robert Hadden, died suddenly of a heart attack in the street near his church in Mayfair on 11 June 1909. After Hadden's funeral Elgar's publisher, Alfred Littleton, a fellow member of the company, suggested to the composer that he might write a short "musician's dirge" for use at such occasions in the future. Elgar agreed, composed the piece within a week, and sent the score with a note: "Here is the little Elegy you asked for – if it will not do, never mind – tear it up. It is not very original I fear, but it is well meant."

The work is dedicated to Hadden. It was premiered privately at the Mansion House, London on 13 July 1909, and was first given in public in St Paul's Cathedral on 22 November 1914. (Note: The cathedral performance was given in memory of Littleton, who had recently died, and two other deceased members of the company. It was arranged for solo organ, and the then master of the company, the violin maker Arthur Frederick Hill, commented that the piece "did not sound half so good on the organ as when played by a string-band".) It is still (in 2024) played annually in the cathedral, at the company's annual evensong service, in memory of members who have died during the preceding year.

== Analysis ==
The piece is for traditional string orchestra. It is a short work: on record, conductors have typically ranged between a duration of 3 minutes 25 seconds (Sir Adrian Boult) and 4 minutes 20 seconds (Sir John Barbirolli). The composer's own timings when conducting the work were between those two figures.

The work opens in E♭ major. The commentator Jerrold Northrop Moore writes that the opening transmutes the falling seconds of Elgar's part-song "The Angelus" (1909) to a meditative sequence. As the work progresses, the key switches to C minor, and the piece ends on a chord of C major. Several commentators, including Anthony Burton, Colin Clarke and Jonathan Harper-Scott, have connected the "restrained grief" of the music with Elgar's reaction to the death of his friend August Jaeger ("Nimrod" of the Enigma Variations) the previous month. Michael Kennedy describes the Elegy as "wonderful in its unheroic devotional expression of grief – personal, intimate and beautifully proportioned in a long arch of melody".

== Recordings ==
The first recording of the work to be issued was by the London Philharmonic Orchestra, conducted by the composer in the Kingsway Hall on 29 August 1933. It was the last music Elgar conducted: his health was declining and he died the following February. That recording was issued by HMV shortly after his death. It was not, though, the first recording made of the piece: the composer had recorded it on 11 April 1933 with the BBC Symphony Orchestra at EMI's Abbey Road studios. This version was thought to be lost until a test pressing came to light and was issued in a CD transfer in 2017. The earlier version, at 4 minutes and 4 seconds is 21 seconds quicker than the remake.

Barbirolli had a particular fondness for the piece, and recorded it three times: with his Hallé Orchestra in 1947 and 1957 and with the New Philharmonia in 1968. Boult had a tangential personal connection with the work, as he had been an apprentice to its dedicatee, Hadden, at the time of the latter's death. Boult recorded the Elegy with the London Philharmonic in 1975. Other versions on record include those conducted by Neville Marriner (1968), Ainslee Cox (1975), Daniel Barenboim (1975), Norman Del Mar (1980), Leonard Slatkin (1997), Richard Hickox (1998), David Lloyd-Jones (1999) and Sir Andrew Davis (2012), and a version by the conductorless Orpheus Chamber Orchestra (1986).

== Notes, references and sources ==
=== Sources ===
- Grimley, Daniel (2005). "The Chamber Music and Works for Strings". In Daniel Grimley; Julian Rushton (eds.). The Cambridge Companion to Elgar. Cambridge: Cambridge University Press. ISBN 978-1-139-00225-7.
- Harper-Scott, Jonathan (2012). Elgar: An Extraordinary Life. London: Royal Schools of Music. ISBN 978-1-86096-770-2.
- Kennedy, Michael (1989) [1987]. Adrian Boult. London: Papermac. ISBN 978-0-333-48752-5.
- Moore, Jerrold Northrop (1984). Edward Elgar: A Creative Life. Oxford: Oxford University Press. ISBN 978-0-19-315447-6.
