= Nic Jones =

English singer-songwriter (born 1947)

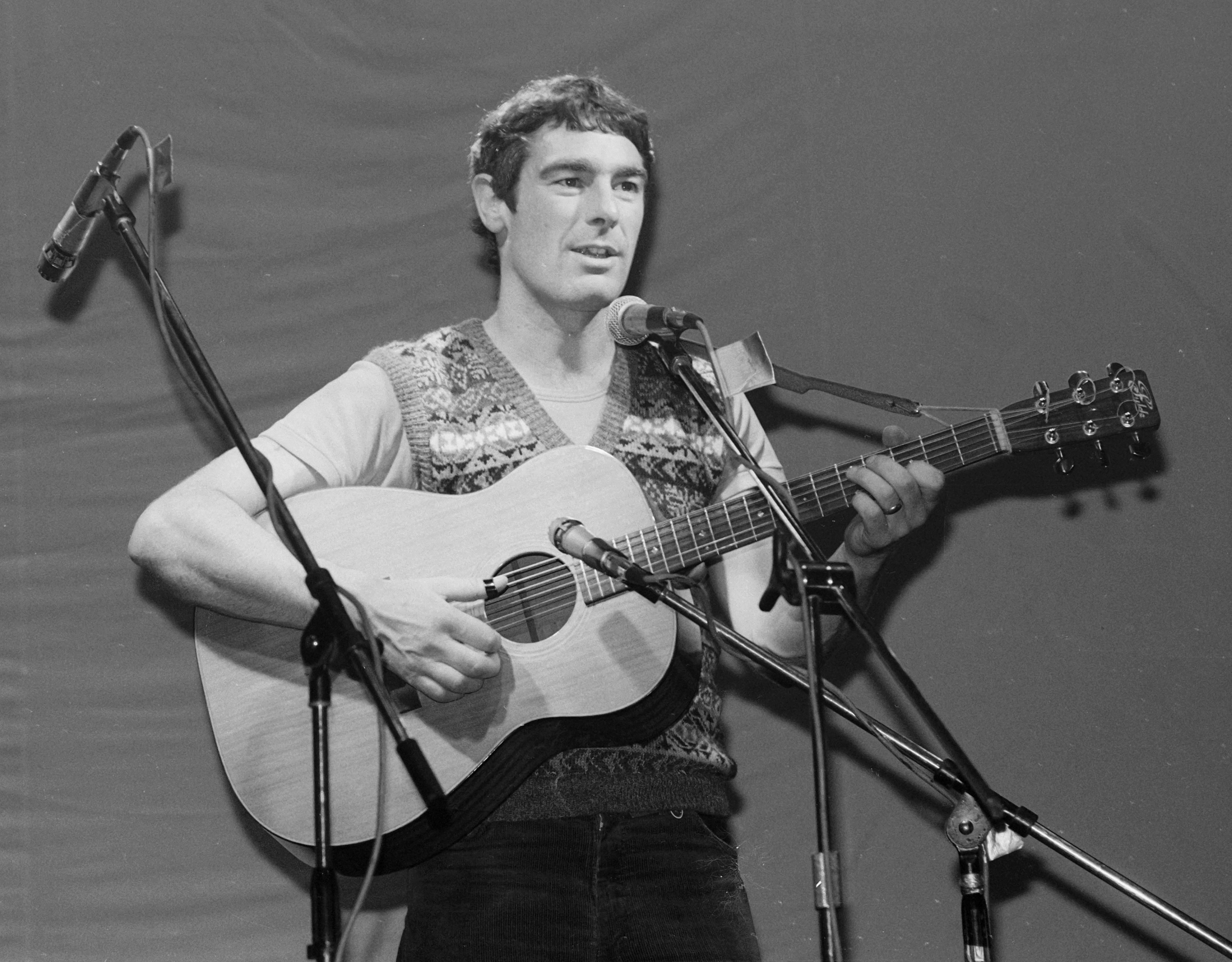
- Jones performing in 1981

Background information
- Born: Nicolas Paul Jones; 9 January 1947 (age 79); Orpington, Kent, England
- Genre: Folk
- Occupations: Singer; songwriter; musician
- Instruments: Vocals; guitar; fiddle
- Years active: 1964–1982; 2010–present
- Labels: Trailer; Shanachie; Highway; Transatlantic; Topic; Mollie Music
- Formerly of: The Halliard; Bandoggs
- Website: nicjones.net

Nic Jones (born Nicolas Paul Jones; 9 January 1947) is an English singer, songwriter and musician. Regarded as a prominent figure of the British folk revival, he has recorded five solo albums and collaborated with various musicians.

== Biography ==
Nic Jones was born on 9 January 1947 in Orpington, Kent, England, where his father owned a newsagent's shop. The family moved to Brentwood in Essex when he was two, and he later attended Brentwood School. He first learned to play guitar as a young teenager and early musical influences included such artists as The Shadows, Duane Eddy, Chet Atkins, Wes Montgomery and Ray Charles. His interest in folk music was aroused by an old school friend, Nigel Paterson who was a member of a folk band called The Halliard. When the members of the group decided to turn professional, one of them left to pursue a different career and Jones was invited to take his place. Whilst playing with The Halliard, Jones learned to play the fiddle and also how to research and arrange traditional material. The group toured the UK between 1964 and 1968, eventually splitting up when two of the members decided to pursue careers outside the folk music business.

In 1968, Jones married Julia Seymour and they eventually had three children together – Daniel (deceased), Helen and Joe. The couple settled in Chelmsford and Jones decided to pursue a career as a solo folk artist. He started playing professional gigs in 1969, and in 1970 released his first album, Ballads and Songs for Trailer Records. Between 1971 and 1980, Jones recorded four more solo albums – three more for Trailer Records and his last, Penguin Eggs, for Topic. Apart from Jones' trademark vocals, fingerstyle guitar and fiddle, the records also introduced guest instrumentalists playing piano, harmonium, bodhran, melodeon and recorders.

During his career, Jones was much in demand as a session musician and he guested on albums by leading UK artists such as June Tabor, Shirley Collins, Barbara Dickson, Richard Thompson and many others. Jones joined fellow folk singers Jon Raven and Tony Rose for the 1973 trio album Songs of a Changing World. Also alongside Tony Rose, as well as Pete Coe and Chris Coe, Jones was a member of short-lived folk group, Bandoggs; one eponymously titled album was released in 1978.

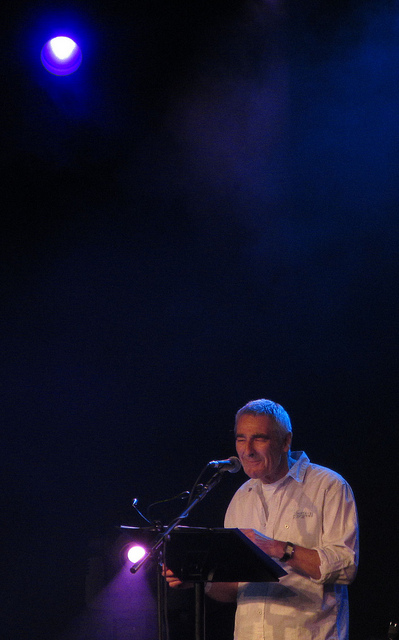
Nic Jones at the 2012 Cambridge Folk Festival

On 28 February 1982, (age 35), Jones was involved in a serious road traffic accident. Returning home by car after a gig at Glossop Folk Club, on the road between Peterborough and March in Cambridgeshire, Jones, tired, inadvertently drove into a lorry pulling out of Whittlesea brickworks. He suffered serious injuries, including many broken bones and brain damage, and required intensive care treatment and hospitalisation for a total of eight months. His injuries left him with permanent physical co-ordination problems, unable to play the guitar as well as before, and no longer able to play the fiddle at all. The accident effectively ended his career as a touring and recording professional musician.

Jones currently lives in Devon and continues to play guitar and write songs for his own pleasure and enjoys playing chess. His wife Julia set up the record label Mollie Music which has issued four albums of re-mastered live recordings from Jones's early career.

The accompanying book to the Topic Records 70 year anniversary boxed set Three Score and Ten lists Penguin Eggs as one of the classic albums. with "The Humpback Whale" from the album as the first track on the first CD in the set and "Clyde Water" from Game Set Match as track seven on the seventh CD.

On 5 August 2010, after an absence of 28 years, Jones made a return to the stage. He appeared at an event dedicated to his music at Sidmouth Folk Week. Jones sang three songs with one of his former bands Bandoggs, and commented that he would "consider performing again – but wanted to sing his own songs." In 2012, Jones (with musicians Joseph Jones – Nic's son – and Belinda O'Hooley) performed his first solo concerts for 30 years at the Warwick, Cambridge, Wadebridge and Towersey folk festivals. On 22 September 2012, Jones was presented with The Gold Badge of the English Folk Dance & Song Society, at a special concert at Cecil Sharp House, London. It is the highest honour the E.F.D.S.S. can confer on a musician. On 30 January 2013, Jones was named Folk Singer of the Year at the BBC Radio 2 Folk Awards. On 23 August 2013, the Nic Jones Trio (comprising him, Joseph Jones and Belinda O'Hooley) performed on the opening night of that year's Shrewsbury Folk Festival, in the course of which it was announced from the stage that it was to be their final performance.

== Guitar style ==
Jones developed an intricate, rhythmically complex finger picking and strumming guitar style. He started off playing in standard guitar tuning (EADGBE) but then gravitated towards a variety of open tunings after hearing the recordings of Martin Carthy, whom he acknowledges as an important influence. These included tunings such as the well-known DADGAD, but also variants of B♭, C and G major/minor/modal tunings heard on such tracks as for "Canadee-I-O" (B♭ F B♭ F B♭ C) and similarly but with a capo for "Billy Don't You Weep For Me". Jones was also influenced by classical and flamenco guitar playing.

Early in his career he played a small-bodied Epiphone acoustic guitar. He then played a Fylde Oberon acoustic guitar before moving on to a Fylde Orsino, which better suited his style. He used a plastic thumb pick and "bare" fingers. Jones plucked the strings with some force causing the strings to lift up and rebound against the fretboard – accounting for the "spitting", slapping sound characteristic of Jones' guitar accompaniments. Another important feature was a regular percussive sound made by striking downwards with the middle and ring fingers of the right hand on damped bass strings close to or above the bridge of the guitar. This is akin to the technique used by banjo players called frailing. This can be heard to good effect on such Jones tracks as "Ten Thousand Miles" (on The Noah's Ark Trap, 1977) and "Master Kilby" (on From the Devil to a Stranger, 1978). Jones also used selective string damping to achieve other percussive effects such as on "Billy Don't You Weep For Me" (on From the Devil to a Stranger).

A feature of his later, mature guitar style is the introduction of subtle counterpoint lines that complement the lead vocals. This can be heard on such songs as "Miles Weatherhill", "The Golden Glove", and "Courting is a Pleasure".

== Discography ==
Jones's first four albums were originally released on vinyl on the Trailer Records label. Currently only the first two are available on CD. Legal wrangles continue to impede Jones's full back-catalogue from being re-released.

In 2001, Penguin Eggs was voted to second place in the "Best Folk Album of all Time" by listeners of the Mike Harding show on BBC Radio 2. The opening track on this album, "Canadee-I-O," was also recorded by Bob Dylan and included on his 1992 album Good as I Been to You. Some critics, such as FRoots editor Ian A. Anderson, have accused Dylan of stealing Jones's arrangements for this song, without credit or offer of royalties.

=== Solo ===
Studio albums:

- Ballads and Songs (1970)
- Nic Jones (1971)
- The Noah's Ark Trap (1977)
- From the Devil to a Stranger (1978)
- Penguin Eggs (1980)

Remastered live albums:

- In Search of Nic Jones (1998)
- Unearthed (2001)
- Game Set Match (2006)

=== With The Halliard ===
- It's The Irish in Me – The Halliard (1967)
- The Halliard and Jon Raven (1967)
- Broadside Songs (2005 – the Halliard songs from and Jon Raven, plus 10 more)
- The Last Goodnight! (2005 – long-lost recording from 1968, plus three more)

=== With Bandoggs ===
- Bandoggs (1978)

=== With Maddy Prior and June Tabor ===
- Silly Sisters (1976)

Jones has also sung, and played guitar and fiddle, on recordings by many other folk artists.

In 1999, John Wesley Harding released a tribute album entitled Trad Arr Jones.
