= The Royal Versailles Ball =

Historic Charity Event at Versailles

- Genre: Charity ball
- Date: 21 May 2022
- Venue: Palace of Versailles and Hôtel de Charost
- Locations: Versailles, Paris
- Country: France
- Attendance: 1,100
- Patrons: Prince Michael of Kent; Jean-Christophe, Prince Napoléon; Olympia, Princess Napoléon; Sir Rodney Williams GCMG; The Duke of Rutland; The Duke of Fife; The Marquess of Reading; Baron Winston; Lord Lyon King of Arms; Sir Ranulph Fiennes Bt OBE; Sir John and Lady Huntington-Whiteley Bt; Julia Carrick OBE; Debbie Wiseman OBE; Professor Kate Williams; Dani Stephenson
- Organiser: Royal Versailles Ball Committee
- People: Antonia Da Silva Teixeira (chair); Edward Hilary Davis; Emma Murray-Jones; Flo Stephenson; Jamie Bowler; Katharine Lovatt; Kristen Mankosa; Laura Day Webb; Leonora Service; Maddy Everington; Sarah Martin; Sebastian O'Reilly; Sophie Karl; Stephanie von Oppell; Tommy Tomova
- Website: royalversaillesball.com

The Royal Versailles Ball was a charitable private event held at the Palace of Versailles on 21 May 2022. The ball celebrated the historic 1855 state visit of Queen Victoria, and the ball held by Napoleon III at the Palace of Versailles in her honour. The goal of the ball was to raise money primarily for children's charities.

The event was organised by a committee of volunteers, and attended by over 1,100 guests, supporting the charities Street Child, Lewa, and UNICEF. The chief Royal patrons were Prince Michael of Kent and Jean-Christophe, Prince Napoléon.

== Origins and history ==
As the new Emperor of the French, Napoleon III's greatest aim was to reconcile his country with England and to heal the wounds of the Napoleonic Wars.

Following detailed correspondences between both rulers, Queen Victoria invited the emperor to come on a State Visit to England in 1855. In April of that year, cheering crowds flocked to catch a glimpse of ‘Boney’ as he arrived in London, and at Windsor he was invested as a Knight of the Garter, an order founded when England was at odds with France in the Hundred Years War.

With the successful visit to England complete, both Royal couples – Queen Victoria and Prince Albert, Napoleon III and Empress Eugenie – were animated about the return State Visit to France. On 18 August 1855, Napoleon III journeyed to Boulogne to receive his British guests. The port that had witnessed his uncle Napoleon's planned invasion of England but was now to welcome the Queen of England. The significance of this day could not be ignored. The last English monarch to formally make the journey to Paris was King Henry VI – who was crowned King of France in 1432 in Notre Dame (coincidentally the same place as Napoleon I). After impressive tours of the Tuileries, St Cloud, the Louvre, and various parties, Napoleon III led the Queen and the Prince Consort to the climax of the tour – a grand ball.

Emperor Napoleon III called on the assistance of his wife, Empress Eugénie to find inspiration for the ball. For this, she turned to none other than the 18th century French court and the lavish parties of Louis XV. The Hall of Mirrors and the Orangerie had been the setting of numerous important fetes, celebrations, political and diplomatic events. Here, France hosted Queen Victoria the first state visit from an English monarch in four centuries.

Great preparations had been made for this historic moment. Gas lighting was installed in the Hall of Mirrors, the marble courtyard and opera. Four orchestras were brought in along with the celebrated conductor Isaac Strauss. The sovereigns danced with each other's partners among the 1,200 other guests. They adjourned for dinner in the opera house and continued dancing until the following morning. It was the first social ball to take place at the palace since the revolution of 1789. Napoleon III proudly wore his new Garter sash and Eugénie, whose grandfather had been a Scotsman (William Kirkpatrick), and was particularly fond of her Scottish roots, at times wore the Kirkpatrick tartan. Bertie, the Prince of Wales (later Edward VII) was also present, dressed in highland dress.

Victoria wrote that the Hall of Mirrors was "full of people and one blaze of light from endless lustres, wreaths of flowers hanging down from the ceiling" and that she did a great deal of dancing. Victoria was also particularly enamoured of the charming Napoleon III – a man of the world whom she could converse with as an equal, while Prince Albert found in Eugénie particular intelligence and beauty.

The ball and state visit successfully set a precedent for Britain and France to be allies and set the two nations on a trajectory towards closer bonds of friendship. The two state visits certainly ranked among the most important accomplishments in the lives of Victoria and Napoleon III. Arguably, the bonds of friendship formed during the events in Paris and London in 1855 between the British and French Royal and Imperial families, helped to found the path which led to the Cobden-Chevalier Treaty and, later, the Entente Cordiale.

== The Ball ==
The Royal Versailles Ball's aim was to celebrate more than a century and a half of friendship between France and the United Kingdom, as well as support international children's charities. Preparations began in August 2019 to hold the Ball in May 2020, however, owing to the COVID-19 pandemic, the event was postponed twice before settling on 21 May 2022. Smaller ancillary events also took place at the British Embassy in Paris, Hôtel de Charost, and the Airelles Grand Crontole, within the Chateau Versailles.

The main event at the palace of Versailles was preceded by two other events. Firstly, a benefactors dinner at Airelles Grand Crontole, within the Chateau Versailles where a silent charity auction was held as well as a book launch. Secondly, an evening reception and further charity auction at the British Embassy in Paris, Hôtel de Charost hosted by the British Ambassador to France, Dame Menna Rawlings DCMG.

In celebration of Eugénie's and Victoria's love of all things Scottish, the main event was primarily a Scottish reeling ball. 1,100 guests were given private tours of the palace and state apartments before making their way to the gardens and fountains to the Orangerie for dinner accompanied by an orchestra conducted by Debbie Wiseman. A silent charity auction was held throughout the evening. Following dinner, a fireworks display was given in the Orangerie, followed by the marching pipes and drums of the Paris and District Pipe Band – this was followed by dancing. The ball closed with renditions of God Save the Queen, La Marseillaise, and Auld Lang Syne.

The British Royal Family was represented by HRH Prince Michael of Kent, great-great-grandson of Queen Victoria. The French imperial family was represented by Jean-Christophe, Prince Napoléon, current Head of the House of Bonaparte and four-times-great-nephew of Napoleon I. Her Excellency Dame Menna Rawlings DCMG, the British Ambassador to France was also present as well as the President of Versailles, Catherine Pégard.

As part of the festivities, a non-fiction book about the history of the Bonapartes which documented the 1855 ball, 'The British Bonapartes: Napoleon's Family in Britain' by Edward Hilary Davis, was launched at Versailles. The Foreword to the book was written by Jean-Christophe, Prince Napoléon.

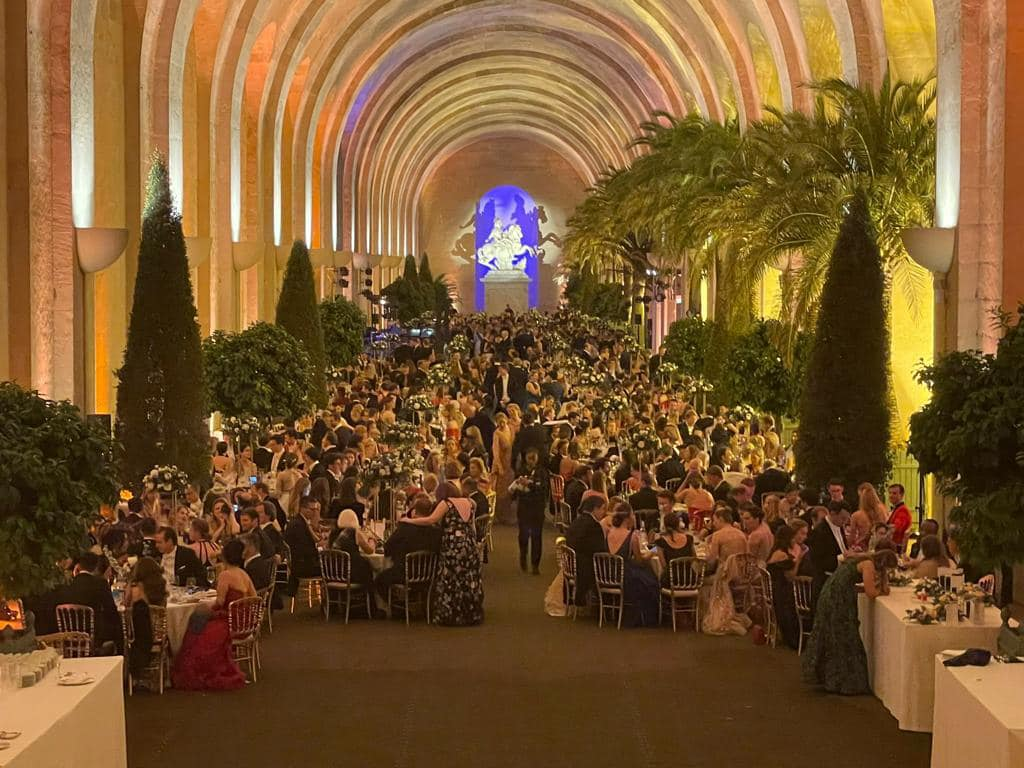
The 1,100 guests at dinner in the Orangerie at the Royal Versailles Ball, 21 May 2022

== Performances ==
Performances were given by a collection of world class musicians. These included: Austrian classical violinist and composer, Yury Revich, who gave a brief recital in the Hall of Mirrors; The First Piper Ross Jennings, a solo bagpiper who is near to becoming the first piper to perform in every country in the world; celebrated British composer for film and television Debbie Wiseman OBE together with member's of the Locrian Ensemble of London (chamber orchestra); Infamous Grouse, one of the UK's most popular reeling bands; The Paris and District Pipe Band – an official member of the Royal Scottish Pipe Band Association; and DJ Bambi Rambo.Debbie Wiseman also composed and conducted the world premiere of a waltz which she wrote especially for The Royal Versailles Ball: The Orangerie Waltz.

== Dances ==
- Dashing White Sergeant
- Duke of Perth (reel)
- Rock & Roll / Foxtrot
- Eightsome / Foursome
- Hamilton House
- Waltzes
- Duke & Duchess of Edinburgh
- Mairi's Wedding / Quickstep
- Reel of the 51st Highlanders (Aberdonian)

== Patrons ==
- HRH Prince Michael of Kent GCVO KStJ
- HIH Jean-Christophe, Prince Napoléon
- HIH Olympia, Princess Napoléon
- His Excellency Sir Rodney Williams GCMG KStJ, Governor General of Antigua and Barbuda
- The Duke of Rutland
- The Duke of Fife
- The Most Hon. The Marquess of Reading
- The Rt. Hon. Baron Winston
- The Rt. Hon. Lord Lyon King of Arms, Joseph John Morrow CVO CBE KStJ KC DL
- Sir Ranulph Fiennes Bt OBE
- Lt Cdr Sir John Miles Huntington-Whiteley Bt VRD RNR and Lady Huntington-Whiteley (Countess Victoria zu Castell-Rudenhausen)
- Julia Carrick OBE
- Debbie Wiseman OBE
- Professor Kate Williams
- Dani Stephenson

== Charities ==
- Street Child – Street Child of Sierra Leone (commonly referred to as Street Child or SCoSL) is a United Kingdom-based charity employing local people in Sierra Leone which was founded in 2008 in London. Its stated mission is to reduce the number of children living on the streets by reuniting them with their families and putting them in long-term education.
- Lewa – also known as Lewa Downs, located in northern Kenya. It was formed in 1995 and is a wildlife sanctuary incorporating the Ngare Ndare Forest covering over 62,000 acres.
- UNICEF – United Nations International Children's Emergency Fund, now officially United Nations Children's Fund.

== Organising Committee ==
The Organising Committee was composed entirely of volunteers. These were mostly young professionals from England, Scotland, France, Canada, and the United States.

- Antonia Da Silva Teixeira
- Edward Hilary Davis MStJ
- Emma Murray-Jones
- Flo Stephenson
- Jamie Bowler
- Katharine Lovatt
- Kristen Mankosa
- Laura Day Webb
- Leonora Service
- Maddy Everington
- Sarah Martin
- Sebastian O'Reilly
- Sophie Karl
- Stephanie von Oppell
- Tommy Tomova

== Partners and sponsors ==
The following brands, companies and organisations partnered with, or sponsored, the Royal Versailles Ball and its events:

- Bonhams
- Le Meurice, The Dorchester Collection
- Everrati
- Clarendelle, Domaine Clarence Dillon
- The Dalmore, Dalmore distillery
- Champagne Brimoncourt
- Louis XIII (cognac) by Rémy Martin
- Floward (Flowers)
- TL Paris
- Sunday Riley (skincare)
- Ethos of London (fine jewelry)
- Roman Tavast
- Gem X
- La Beau Monde
- Clive Christian Perfume
- Queenie, Fine Jewelry
- Quintessentially Travel
- BSCG – Prince Boris of Saxe-Coburg-Gotha
- Monopure
- Events & Patrimoine Agence
- Duygu Ay
- Novus
