= Royal Caledonian Ball =

Ball held annually in London

Coordinates: 51°30′35.0″N 0°09′17.3″W

- Status: Active
- Genre: Charity ball
- Frequency: Annually
- Venue: Grosvenor House Hotel
- Locations: 86-90 Park Lane; London W1K 7TN
- Country: United Kingdom
- Inaugurated: 1849
- Founder: George, Duke of Atholl; Anne, Duchess of Atholl
- Most recent: 10 May 2024
- Attendance: 1,300+ (record set in 1980s)
- Patrons: The Princess Royal and The Duke of Kent
- Organiser: Royal Caledonian Ball Trust Committee
- People: Charles, Earl of Kinnoull (president); Merlin, Earl of Erroll (vice president)
- Website: royalcaledonianball.com

The Royal Caledonian Ball is a ball held annually in London for the benefit of Scottish charities. With few exceptions, the Royal Caledonian Ball has been held annually since 1849, and is the oldest charity ball in the world.

== History ==
The ball dates to the 1840s, when George, Duke of Atholl, and his wife, Anne, wanted to entertain their Scottish friends residing in London. By 1849, it had become a fundraiser for Scottish charities helping vulnerable schoolchildren, the homeless, and cancer patients.

The Royal Caledonian Ball has been held every year since, except during the Boer War, World War I and World War II; following the death of King Edward VII on 6 May 1910, and during the COVID-19 pandemic in 2020.

The ball has been under the royal patronage since Edward VII. Since the 1930s, the event has been held at the Grosvenor House Hotel on Park Lane, London. The Queen was often in attendance.

In recent years, the ball has been featured in the Bystander section of Tatler.

== Dance and dress ==
The Royal Caledonian Ball dress code stipulates that male attendees wear Highland evening dress, evening tails with white tie, or mess dress. Women should wear floor-length evening dress or mess dress; tartan sashes are encouraged.

Originally, men wore full evening tartan while women were dressed in white, with a tartan sash. Indeed, it was the only socially acceptable opportunity to wear full tartan outside Scotland.

The event is known for its Scottish country dancing, and it is traditional for guests at the ball to dance every reel:

- Dashing White Sergeant
- Reel of the 51st Highlanders
- Eightsome Reel
- Foursome Reel
- Mairi's Wedding
- Hamilton House
- Duke of Perth
- Inverness Country Dance
- The Duke and Duchess of Edinburgh
- Quickstep
- D'ye ken John Peel

Traditionally, the Duke and Duchess of Atholl are the first couple to start the dance, followed by his private army, the Atholl Highlanders.

== Charities ==
The ball supports numerous charities in Scotland and has raised an estimated £3 million since its inception.

Among the charities the ball supports are Queen Victoria School in Dunblane, Erskine Hospital, and St Catherine's Homeless Project in Edinburgh.
