= Imperial Majesty =

Style of address of emperors

Imperial Majesty (His/Her Imperial Majesty, abbreviated as HIM) is a style used by Emperors and Empresses. It distinguishes the status of an emperor/empress from that of a King/Queen, who are simply styled Majesty. Holders of this style have sometimes been observed to follow religious leaders who are styled "His Holiness" in public ceremonies.

== Monarchs ==
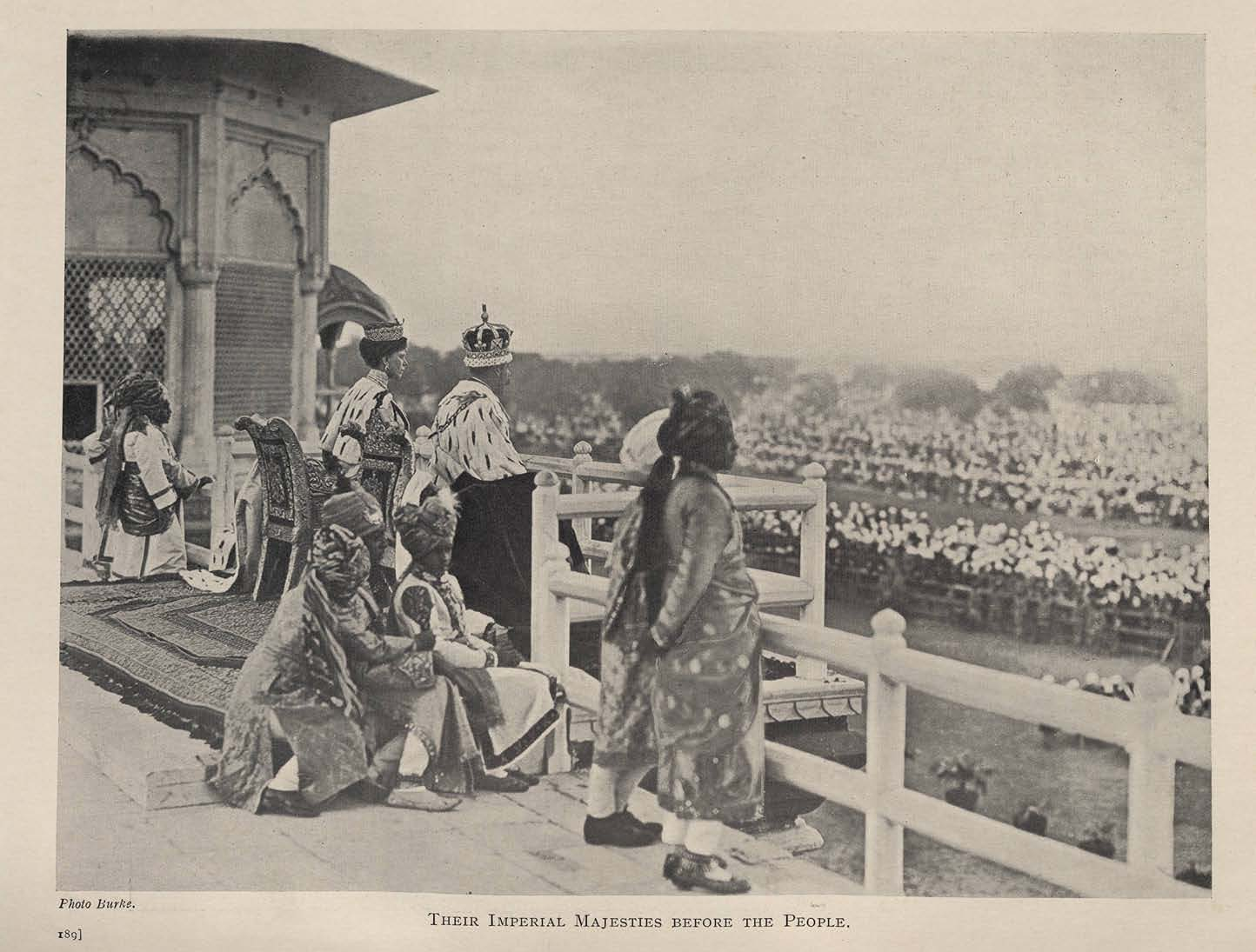
A photograph captioned "Their Imperial Majesties before the People", showing George V and Mary as emperor and empress of India following the 1911 Delhi Durbar.

King-Emperors and Queen-Empresses sometimes have used the style Imperial and Royal Majesty (e.g., The Empress Frederick's style Her Imperial and Royal Majesty The German Empress and Queen of Prussia).

Although the Crown of England was defined as an "imperial" crown during the reign of Henry VIII under the Ecclesiastical Appeals Act 1532, (Note: In William Blackstone's 1765 Commentaries on the Laws of England, he explained that "the meaning therefore of the legislature, when it uses these terms of empire and imperial, and applies them to the realm and crown of England, is only to assert that our king is equally sovereign and independent within these his dominions, as any emperor is in his empire; and owes no kind of subjection to any other potentate on earth.") he adopted the style "Majesty". British monarchs used the title Emperor/Empress of India from 1876 to 1948. Despite bearing an imperial title, they did not use the style "Imperial and Royal Majesty", which Benjamin Disraeli called "clumsy periphrasis". However, they were sometimes referred to as "Imperial Majesty" in India itself.

The last Shah of Iran, Mohammad Reza Pahlavi, also used the style of "Imperial Majesty". Today, the style is assumed by Farah Pahlavi, the exiled Shahbanu of Iran.

Incongruously, in modern times the Emperor of Japan rarely uses the style of "Imperial Majesty", instead preferring the simpler style of "Majesty". This is despite the imperial titles still used by the rest of the imperial household.

== Other uses ==
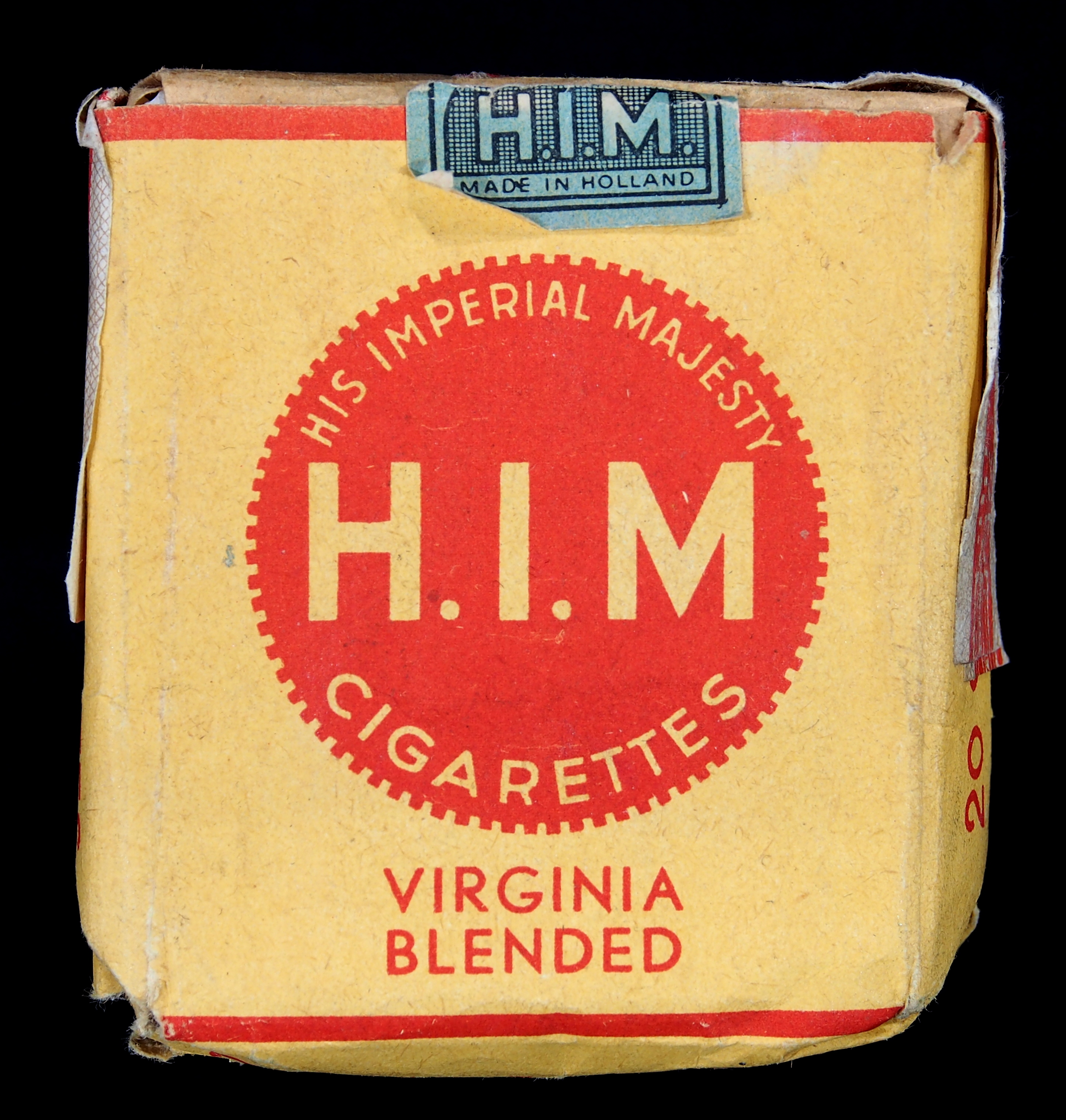
A pack of H.I.M branded cigarettes.

The phrase has also been used for commercial products and services, including a brand of cigarettes, the Imperial Majesty Cruise Line, and a Clive Christian Perfume known as 'No.1 Imperial Majesty' which holds the Guinness World Record for the most expensive perfume commercially available at £115,000 per 500 ml in 2005.

== See also ==
- Imperial and Royal Majesty
