= Clutha =

Clutha may refer to:

- The name of the River Clyde in Latin, from Cumbric (as in Ystrad Clut)
- Clutha ferry passenger steamers on the River Clyde in Glasgow from 1884 to 1903
- Clutha (dance), a Scottish country dance
- The Clutha, a traditional Scottish band
- Clutha River, common English-language name of the Clutha River / Mata-au river in New Zealand; named after the River Clyde
- Clutha District, New Zealand; named after the Clutha River
- Clutha County, New Zealand; named after the Clutha River
- Clutha, a historic New Zealand electorate
- Clutha-Southland, a New Zealand electorate, named after the Clutha River
- Balclutha, New Zealand, often abbreviated to Clutha
- Inch Clutha, an island sitting in the delta of the Clutha / Mata-au River
- The Clutha Vaults, a pub in Glasgow, Scotland, the site of a helicopter crash in 2013
