= Roger de Coverley =

Country dance

Roger de Coverley being danced in Alexandria, Virginia in 2019

Roger de (or of) Coverley (also Sir Roger de Coverley or ...Coverly) is the name of an English country dance and a Scottish country dance (also known as The Haymakers). An early version was published in The Dancing Master, 9th edition (1695). The Virginia Reel is a North American adaptation.

== History ==
The dance Roger of Coverly probably originated in Northern England; An early version was published in The Dancing Master, 9th edition (1695). The tune is said to derive its name from the Calverley family, who hailed from Calverley, Yorkshire. A manuscript in the British Museum called The First and Second division Violin, which is attributed to John Eccles, 1705, describes the tune as "Roger of Coverly the true Cheisere way." Alternatively Roger refers to Royalists in the English Civil War and that ‘Coverly’ was a corruption of ‘Cavalier’ The Virginia reel is a North American adaptation.

The dance is supposed to be danced at the end of the evening.

== References in modern culture ==
It is mentioned in Charles Dickens' A Christmas Carol (1843) when the Ghost of Christmas Past shows Scrooge a party from his apprenticeship with Mr. Fezziwig. "...the great effect of the evening came after the Roast and Boiled, when the fiddler ... struck up 'Sir Roger de Coverley'. Then old Fezziwig stood out to dance with Mrs. Fezziwig." In the 1951 film Scrooge, based on Dickens's story and starring Alastair Sim in the title role, the fiddler is shown playing the tune at an energetic tempo during the party scene. It figures in William Makepeace Thackeray's short story The Bedford-Row Conspiracy as the musical centrepiece of a political feast pitting the Whigs against the Tories, and in Arnold Bennett's novel Leonora as music considered by the older gents as more suitable for a ball than the likes of the Blue Danube Waltz. The 1985 British TV adaptation of Dickens' Pickwick Papers showed the titular character, along with his friends performing the dance at Christmas celebrations at the Manor Farm - Mr. Wardle's residence.

It is also played in the 1939 film version of Wuthering Heights, during the sequence in which Heathcliff, newly established as master of the estate, visits the ball at the invitation of Isabella Linton.

It is mentioned in Chapter 3 of The Egoist by George Meredith: "Willoughby was inexhaustible in the happy similes he poured out to Miss Durham across the lines of Sir Roger de Coverley, and they were not forgotten, they procured him a reputation as a convivial sparkler".

It is mentioned in Silas Marner by George Eliot, when the fiddler at the Cass New Year's Eve party plays it to signal the beginning of the evening's dancing, and in the children's book The Rescuers by Margery Sharp.

Harry Thompson mentions the dance in his first novel This Thing of Darkness: "... and so it was that, five minutes later, he found himself bowing to her, and she curtsying in reply, as they lined up facing one another for the commencement of the Sir Roger de Coverley".

The dance plays a part in the Dorothy Sayers short story "The Queen's Square"; in Washington Irving's The Sketch Book of Geoffrey Crayon, Gent.; in Stig of the Dump by Clive King when Barney and his sister attend a fancy dress party; in D H Lawrence's Sons and Lovers (1913), where Gertrude Morel is reported never to have learned the dance; and in Anthony Trollope's novel Can You Forgive Her? Vol. 2 Ch. IX.

The tune was used by Frank Bridge in 1922 as the basis of a work for strings titled Sir Roger de Coverly (A Christmas Dance).

A bookbinder by the name Roger de Coverly (1831-1914) worked in London from the 1870s.

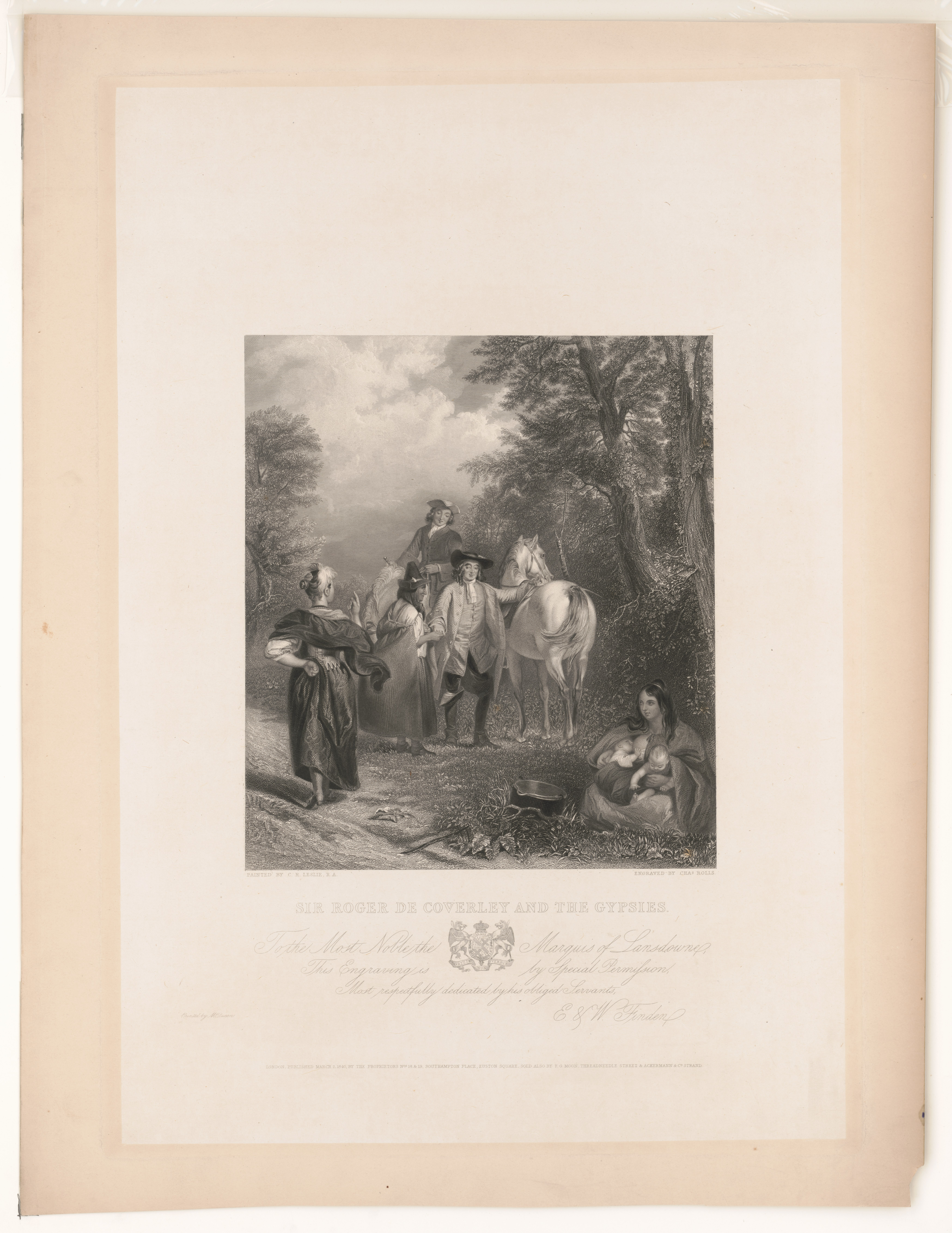
Sir Roger de Coverley and gypsies, 1840 engraving

== Fictional character ==
Sir Roger de Coverley was also the name of a fictional character in The Spectator (1711), created by Joseph Addison and Richard Steele. An English squire of Queen Anne's reign. Sir Roger exemplified the values of an old country gentleman. He was portrayed as lovable but somewhat ridiculous ('rather beloved than esteemed') (Spectator no. 2), making his Tory politics seem harmless but silly. He was said to be the grandson of the man who invented the dance.

== See also ==
- List of Scottish country dances
- Strip the willow
