= Eriskay Love Lilt =

Scottish folk song and hymn tune

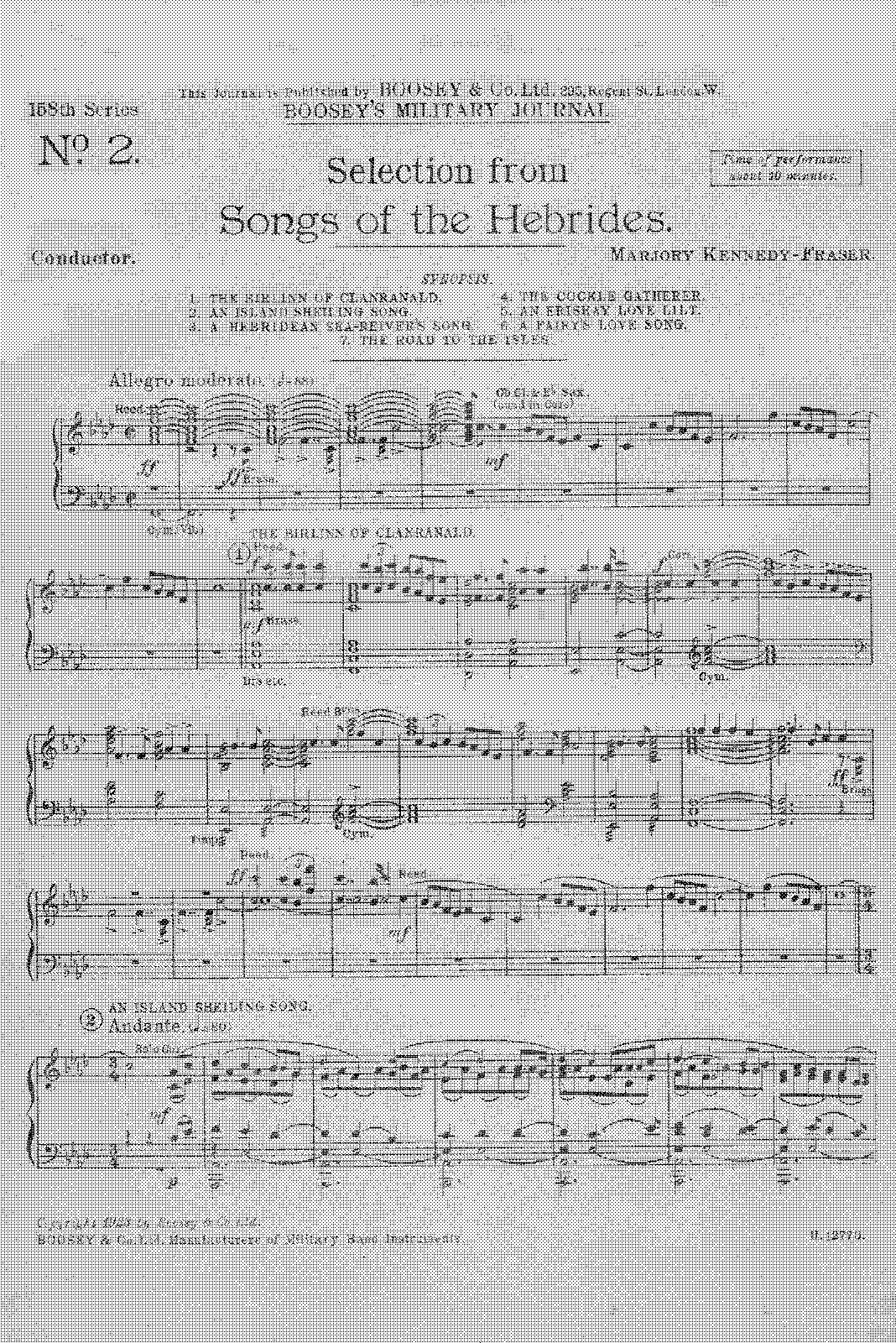
Selection from Songs of the Hebrides.

The "Eriskay Love Lilt" is a Scottish folk song associated with the island of Eriskay in Outer Hebrides of Scotland. The chorus of the song features lyrics in Scottish Gaelic. The modern anglicized art song version was adapted by Marjory Kennedy-Fraser from the lament for unrequited love Gràdh Geal Mo Chridhe, collected during her visits to Eriskay with the help of poet Allan MacDonald, and published in the first volume of Songs of the Hebrides in 1909. Popular versions have been recorded by the Glasgow Orpheus Choir with Hugh S. Roberton, The Corries, Judith Durham and The Seekers, and Paul Robeson.

== Lyrics ==
Popular renditions of the song usually contain a variation of the following verses:

Vair me oro van o
Vair me oro van ee
Vair me oru o ho
Sad am I without thee

When I'm lonely dear white heart
Black the night or wild the sea
By love's light my foot finds
The old pathway to thee

Vair me oro van o
Vair me oro van ee
Vair me oru o ho
Sad am I without thee

Thou'rt the music of my heart
Harp of joy oh cruit mo chridh
Moon of guidance by night
Strength and light thou'rt to me
