= Dumbarton's Drums =

Traditional Scottish song

Dumbarton's Drums is a traditional Scottish song. The text was first printed in 1724 albeit with a different tune. The current tune was popularised by The Beers Family of Fox Hollow, New York in the 1960s.

The song exists in several variants. In most versions the song is sung from the feminine perspective. Masculine lyrics also exist and have been recorded by The Corries with the last verse omitted.

The original version, as collected and recorded by Burns is to a different tune, a brisk march which the Glasgow Orpheus Choir recorded. It also has different words which, were the basis for the popular song.

"Dumbarton's Drums" is the march of the Royal Scots Regiment, with the same name as the folk song but with a different tune.

== See also ==
- George Douglas, 1st Earl of Dumbarton
- Dumbarton
