= Beinn Sciathan =

Highest point on the Outer Hebridean island of Eriskay

Coordinates: 57.07984°N 7.29145°W

Beinn Scrien
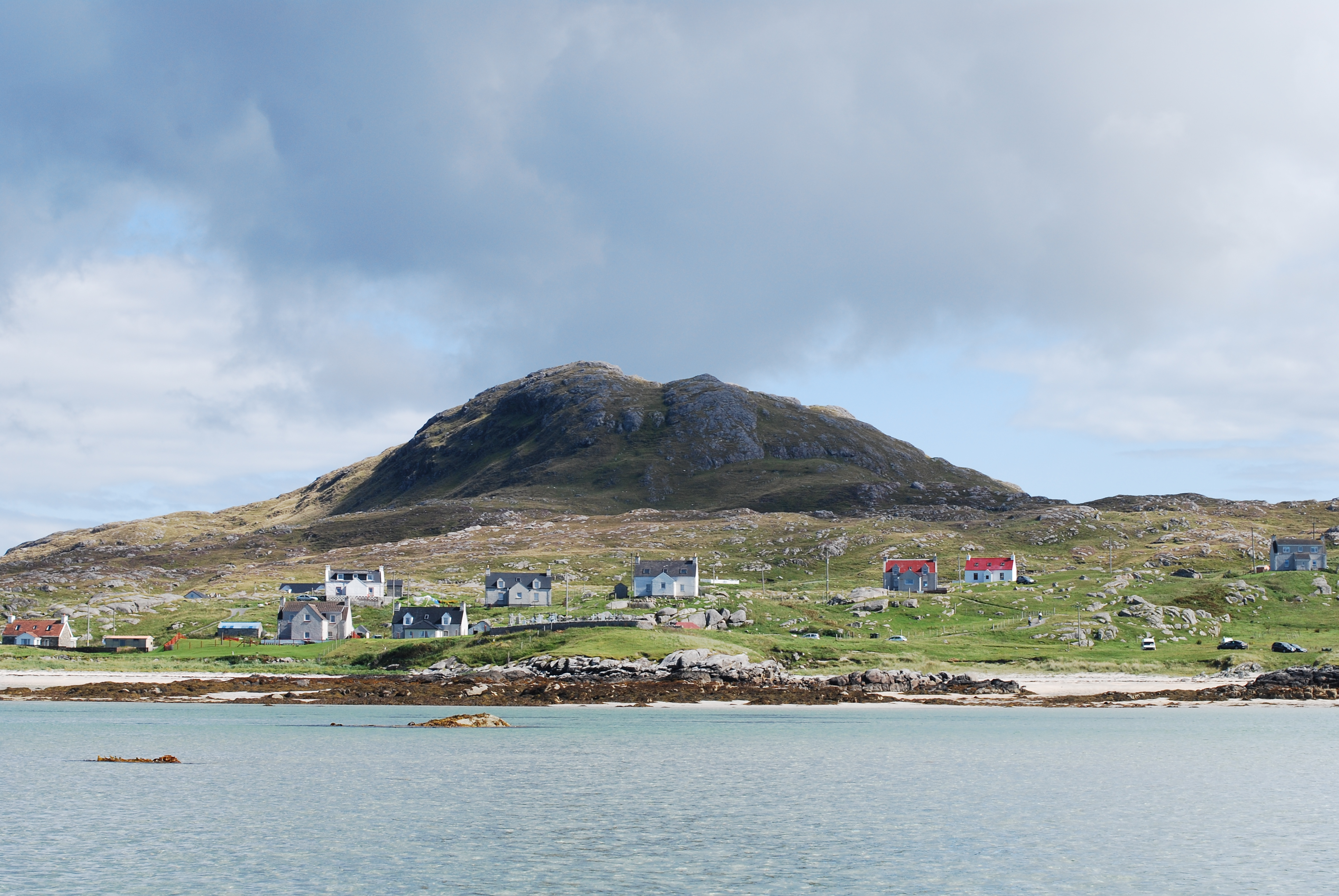

Highest point
- Elevation: 185.6 m (609 ft)
- Prominence: 185.6 m (609 ft)
- Listing: Marilyn

Naming
- Language of name: Gaelic

Geography
- Location: Eriskay, Scotland
- Parent range: Western Isles
- OS grid: NF795111

Ben Scrien, is the highest point on the Outer Hebridean island of Eriskay.

Described as an apparently "uninspiring lump" (Michael Fitzpatrick, 2012) it nevertheless commands fine views of Barra, South Uist, Skye, Tiree and Coll. Between the months of may and November Beinn scrien is home to the islands sheep and the Eriskay ponies. The ascent time is between 0.5 and 1.5 hours.
