= Rinkafadda =

Irish country dance

The rinkafadda (Irish: rince fada or rinnce fada, "long dance") or rinka is a country or field dance that goes back to sixteenth-century Ireland. During this period, visitors to Ireland described the dance consisting of a row of men facing a row of women. Beginning at one end of the line, the couples start dancing one by one until all have joined in, dancing starting at one end, and going to the other and then back again. Noted for its social inclusiveness and its appropriateness to events of public rejoicing, accounts described how all social classes took part in the rince fada together.

The 'Virginia Reel' and 'fadings', 'The Fading' or 'With a fading' - ("A Winter's Tale" Act IV) mentioned by William Shakespeare in A Winter's Tale have been associated with rince fada.
