= Clive Christian =

Scottish designer

Clive Christian, OBE (born 12 July 1951) is a British designer best known for his designer kitchens and his creation of Clive Christian No. 1, the world's most expensive perfume.

== Early life ==
The eldest of four children born to a biochemist father and an artist mother, Christian was born in Dundee, Scotland and raised and educated in Cheshire, England. Upon leaving college, he embarked on a career as a freelance interior designer. He founded his first eponymous business, Clive Christian Furniture, in 1978, and his second, Clive Christian Perfume, in 1999. Clive has three daughters, the eldest, Victoria Christian, serves as Brand Ambassador for Clive Christian Perfume and The Officer of British Excellence.

== Business ==
Clive Christian Furniture was founded in 1978 when Christian bought a manor house in Cheshire built in the late 19th century and began to renovate it with bespoke furniture. The first design released was his Victorian Kitchen. When demand for his designs increased he bought a factory and started to create personal designs for his customers. The range has since been enlarged to cater to every room in the house, from the bedroom to the media/games room.

In 1999 he purchased the Crown Perfumery Company and established Clive Christian Perfume. The perfumery is unique in that it bears the crown of Queen Victoria as granted in 1872 and had been the perfumery of the Royal Victorian court.

In 2019, Clive Christian OBE launched The Officer of British Excellence (www.TheOfficer.com) a directory specialising in Property and Interiors, sourcing off market property in prime Central London and prestigious country estates for residential and investment interests and curating his signature 'chandelier interiors' within these properties using the craftsmen, artisans and specialists he has relied upon throughout his career spanning 50 years.

== Honours ==
Christian was appointed Officer of the Order of the British Empire (OBE) in the 2012 New Year Honours for services to the luxury goods industry.
