= Eriskay Pony =

Breed of horse

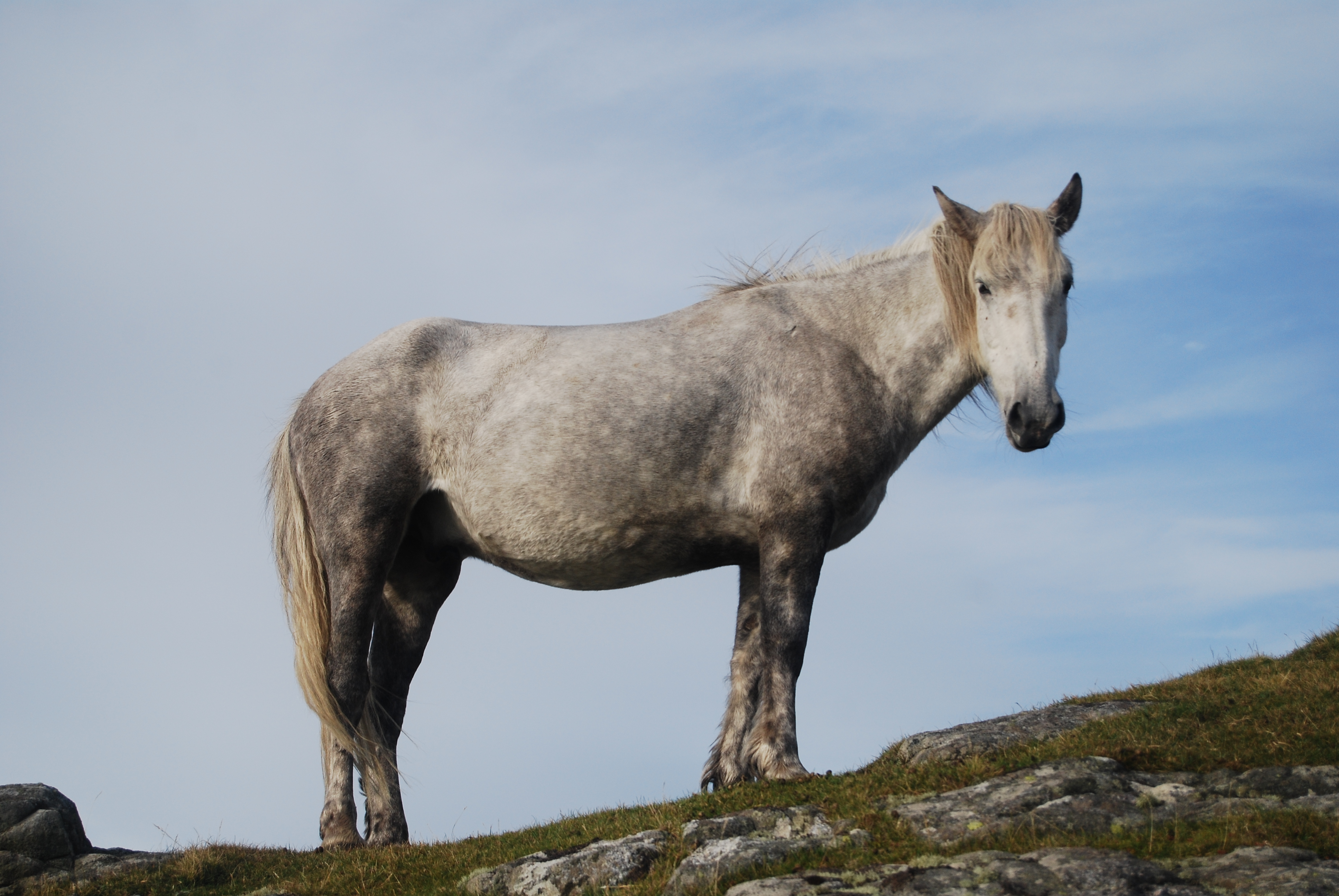
- An Eriskay pony on Eriskay
- Country of origin: Outer Hebrides, Scotland

Traits
- Distinguishing features: Dense, waterproof coat, large head.

Breed standards
- Comann Each nan Eilean - The Eriskay Pony Society; The Eriskay Pony Society

The Eriskay Pony (Scottish Gaelic: Each Beag nan Eilean or Each Èirisgeach) is a breed of pony from Scotland. It is generally grey in colour, and has a dense, waterproof coat that protects it in harsh weather. The breed developed in ancient times in the Hebrides of Scotland, and a small population remained pure and protected from crossbreeding by the remoteness of the islands. It is used for light draught work, driving, and as a mount for children.

The Rare Breeds Survival Trust considers the breed's status to be critical and classes it as a priority breed.. There are two breed registries for the Eriskay Pony: Comann Each nan Eilean - The Eriskay Pony Society, which was formed in 1972 and has the King Charles III as society patron, and The Eriskay Pony Society was formed in 1986. Both societies are recognised as holding a studbook of origin for the breed.

== Characteristics ==
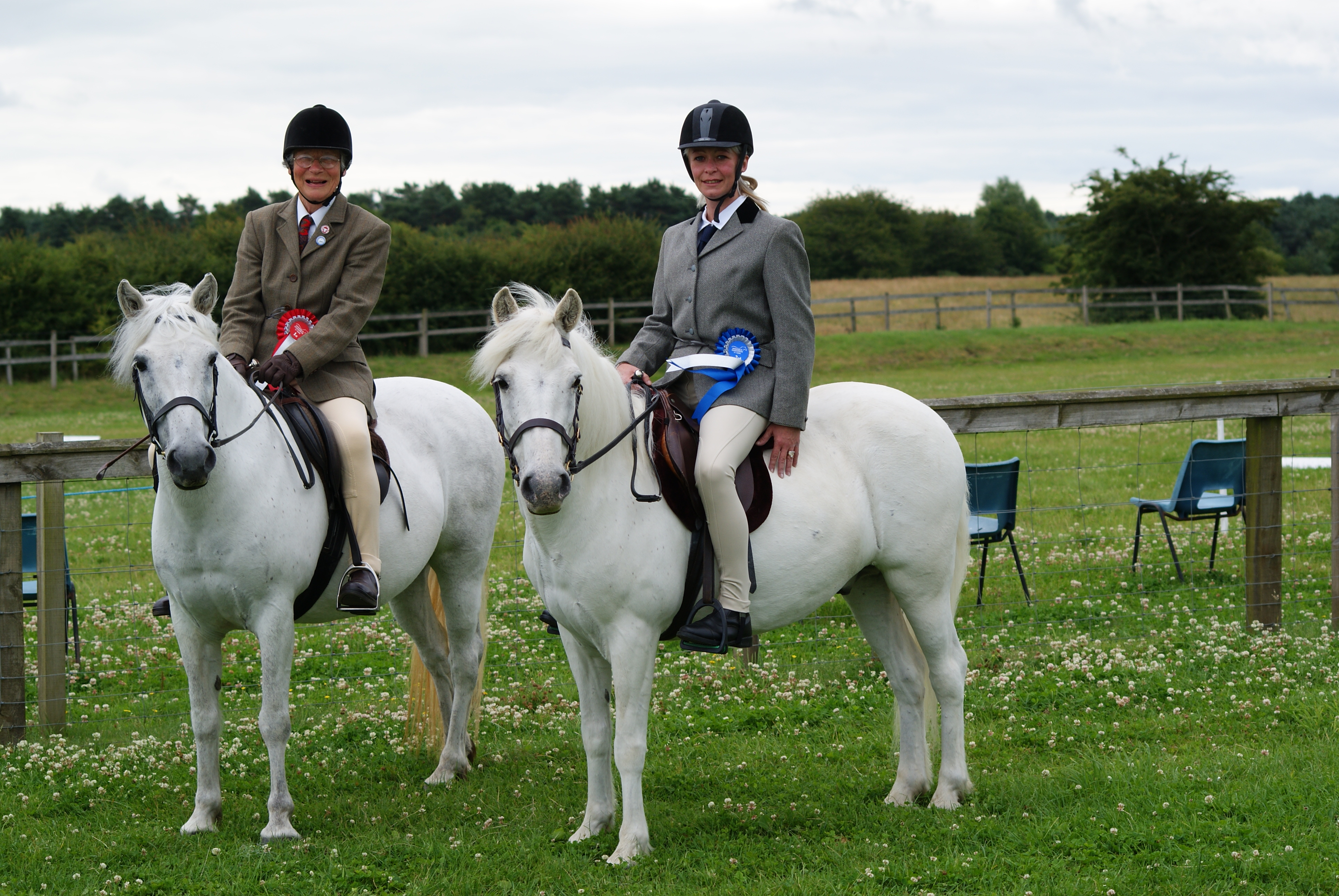
Eriskay ponies at a show

The Eriskay Pony generally stands between 12 and 13.2 hands (48 and 54 inches, 122 and 137 cm). It is usually grey, although a few are bay or black, and never chestnut, piebald, skewbald or white markings.

The winter coat is dense and waterproof, and protects from the harsh climate, with a thick mane and tail. The head is large, with a wide forehead. The neck and shoulders are well muscled, and the chest deep but generally not broad. The rib-cage is long and the loins short, which increases the strength of the back. The croup is slightly sloping.

The Eriskay has an easy-going temperament, and is suitable as a mount for children or for driving.

== History ==
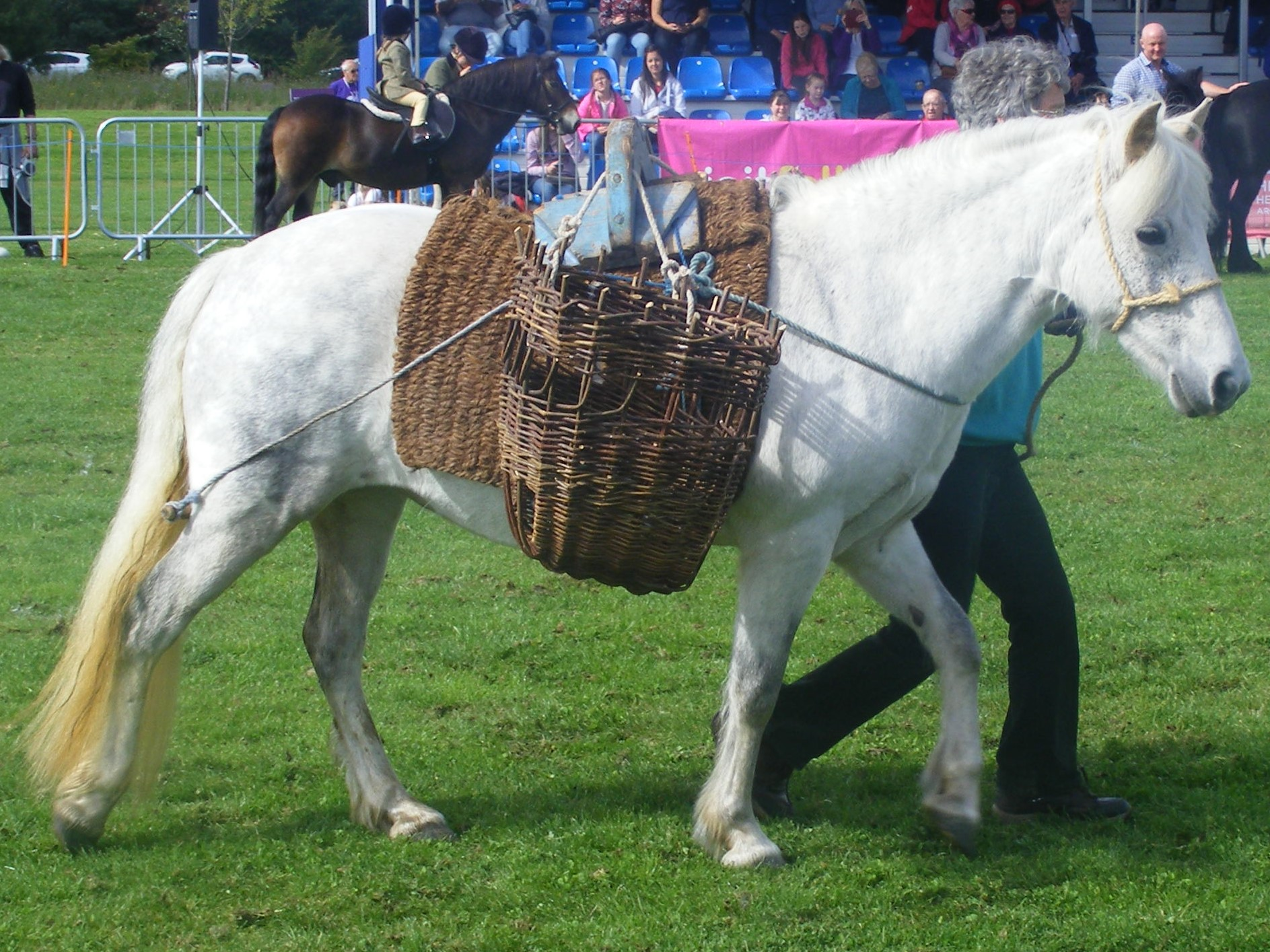
Traditional creel rigging on an Eriskay pony

The Eriskay Pony developed in the Hebrides of Scotland, a group of western isles in Scotland and were originally known as the Western Isles Ponies. Genetic research has shown that the Eriskay pony carries the rare E haplogroup. This is rare in equines worldwide with only some 3% of equines carrying it. It is also an ancient breed as this haplogroup indicates ancestry runnng back to the Bronze Age. It is physically similar to drawings of ponies on ancient Pictish stones found in north and west Scotland.

There has long been unproven statements that the Eriskay pony is related to other northern breeds, including the Icelandic horse and the Faroe pony. Genetic research carried out in recent times shows this is not the case and the Eriskay is a genetically very distinct breed. The Eriskay takes its name from the island of Eriskay in the Outer Hebrides. Originally, the breed had a fairly large population, and until the mid-19th century the Eriskay and similar ponies were found throughout the western islands of Scotland. They were used as crofters' ponies, as pack animals, for light draught and as mounts for children.

During the 19th century numbers were much reduced through increased crossbreeding. The crossbreeding was used to produce larger ponies for draught work, and Eriskays and other island ponies were crossed with horse breeds from mainland Europe, including Arabs and Clydesdales. Other horses, including the Norwegian Fjord, were crossed with island ponies, including the Eriskay, to produce the Highland pony. A few specimens of the Eriskay were preserved on the remotest island of Eriskay in Scotland, mainly due to the difficulties of accessing the island. This stock of ponies remained pure, but through the advent of mechanisation, declined in population to around 20 animals in the early 1970s. In 1941 the SS Politician foundered off the Eriskay coast, and the islanders, using the Eriskay ponies, carried away the cargo of 250,000 bottles of whisky.

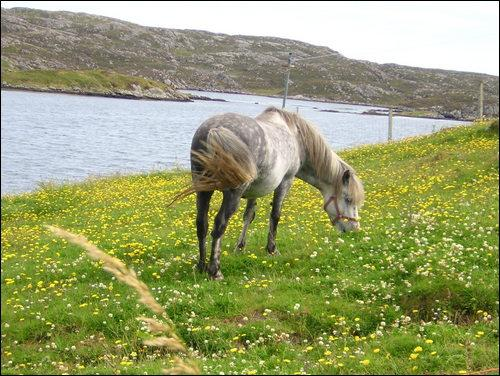
Eriskay pony on the Isle of Lewis in Scotland

Today the Eriskay is rare. Its population is considered to be at priority status by the UK-based Rare Breeds Survival Trust, meaning that there are 300 or fewer breeding females registered in the world today. It is possible that the Eriskay is the last surviving Hebridean pony breed.

There are two breed Societies each of which are Mother Societies in their own right: The Eriskay Pony Society achieved legal recognition as a breed society and passport issuing organisation for the UK in 1995 and Comann Each nan Eilean - The Eriskay Pony Society, which is based in the Isle of Eriskay, received legal recognition in 2002. Both Societies maintain studbooks which are recognised as studbooks of origin for the Eriskay Pony and Comann Each nan Eilean - The Eriskay Pony Society keeps the original studbooks of the Society for the Preservation of the Eriskay Pony from 1972. Both studbooks have their origins in the original studbook. The aim of both Societies is to preserve the breed by retaining the original genetic material and following a careful breeding programme which slows, as far as possible, the rate of inbreeding. Only stock registered in either of the studbooks is used.

In conjunction with the Rare Breeds Survival Trust The Eriskay Pony Society uses the Single Population Analysis Records Keeping System (SPARKS) to provide advice on the genetic suitability of breeding pairs of ponies. The Eriskay Pony Society receives grants from the Horse Race Betting Levy Board to support its breeding efforts. These are used to provide grant aid to breeders, with the amount of grant linked to the suitability of the genetic match of the parents as defined by SPARKS.

In addition to the domesticated ponies, there is a small herd of Eriskay ponies living in a feral state on the Holy Isle. These ponies are descended from a group of five ponies brought to the Holy Isle to when it was owned by the Universities Federation for Animal Welfare in the 1970s to form a nature reserve. Today the island is owned by the Samye Buddhist Centre for World Peace and Health. They operate a policy of non-intervention, allowing the ponies to live without human interference.

== Culture ==
The Gaelic poet Donald MacDonald (Dòmhnall Aonghais Bhàin) was commissioned by Comann Each nan Eilean - The Eriskay Pony Society to compose a praise poem for the Eriskay pony to commemorate the publication of the original studbook in 1972. The poem makes reference to the pony's position as a crofting animal used to transport seaweed and peat, as well as its genial nature towards children.

Bha iad riamh an Èirisgeidh 's gum b' fheumail iad don t-sluagh,

Bha iad troimh na linntean ann sna tìmean chaidh air ruaig;

Thàirneadh iad a' mhòine gu fògairt chur air fuachd

Is làimhsicheadh an òigridh iad 's bha iomadh spòrs 'nan cuairt.

== See also ==
- List of domesticated Scottish breeds
