= Virginia reel (dance) =

English country folk dance

The Virginia reel is a folk dance that dates from the 17th century. Though the reel may have its origins in Scottish country dance and the Highland reel, and perhaps have an even earlier origin from an Irish dance called the Rinnce Fada, it is generally considered to be an English country dance. The dance was most popular in America from 1830 to 1890.

The Virginia reel was a popular dance, with slight regional variations. This has given rise to a large number of dances called the Virginia reel, all of which share certain similarities, such as the reel figure, in which the dancers at the head of the line alternately swing each other and the other dancers in the line.

== History ==
According to the Encyclopedia Britannica, the Virginia reel stems from the Rinnce Fadha, a pre-Christian Irish dance. It evolved into the English dance called the Sir Roger de Coverley. English colonists brought the dance to Virginia and the Sir Roger de Coverley in time became the Virginia reel.

== Description ==
Described below is one version of the Virginia reel.

The dancers usually line up in two lines of 5-8 couples, partners facing each other. Traditionally men would line up on one side, and women on the other, but that is not necessary. The lines have a head and a foot, with the head couple being the nearest the band or music source and the foot couple at the other end of the line. This formation is the same for any version of the Virginia reel. The following calls are given by the leader for beginners, or where there are several sets, so that the different sets do the figures at the same time.

Head lady and foot gentleman forward and back.
The head lady and the foot man advance toward each other four steps and retire four steps backward into place.

Forward again with both hands round.
The head lady and foot man advance, join both hands straight across and make one complete turn, then return to places. The head man and foot lady do the same.

Do-si-do (pronounced dough-see-dough)
The head lady and foot man advance, pass each other right shoulder to right shoulder while crossing their arms, and without turning, go around each other back-to-back and retire backwards to places. The head man and foot lady do the same. It is then repeated by left shoulder (also called a see saw).

Head couple gallops four times through the aisle and back.
The head couple join both hands and chasse (side slip and close) down inside of the lines four steps and return to the head position.

Right arm to partner and reel. (Right to centre, left to the side.)
The head couple link right arms and turn around once and a half. (This leaves the lady facing the men's line and the man facing the ladies' line). The head lady turns the second man (the second man from the head of the line) once around in his place with left arms linked, while the head man does likewise with the second lady. This continues until the man and lady reach the end of the line.

This is where they turn only half way around, instead of a full turn, so that the lady ends up on her side and the man on his side. The head couple then join hands across and chasse (side slip and close) with side steps back to the head of the set. They drop hands and turn out ready for the march.

The march
The head couple separate. The man turns outwards and walks toward the foot directly behind the men's line, followed by all the men in single file. At the same time the head lady does the same thing on her side of the set.

Then the head couple meet at the foot of the set and walk together to the head of the set, followed by the other couples. When all have reached their original places, all the partners, except the head couple, join hands and hold them high to form a long archway under which the head couple, with hands joined, walk through the gate. The original second couple now become head couple and the whole pattern is repeated until all have been head couple.

== Variations ==
When the head couple reach the foot of the set, they stop, join both hands to form an arch while the couples behind them join hands and go under the arch and up the center toward the head position. This leaves the original head couple at the foot and the second couple now becomes the head couple.

Another variation involves all couples (including the head and foot) participating in the advance and retire, the two-hand turn and the do-si-so with their own partners.

== Step ==
The step is a bounce to the step when you sashay down the alley and when you reel.

== Music ==
Music consists of lively old time reel music such as Durang's Hornpipe or Old Zip Coon aka. Turkey in the Straw. Students at the University of Virginia dance the reel to 'The Rattlin' Bog' or 'Scotland the Brave' with variations on the chorus at the annual Colonnade and Restoration Balls. When done with four couples, the record usually used for the song was MacGregor #7345, labeled Virginia Reel (Haste to the Wedding).

== Modern day ==
Virginia Reel is one of the traditional dances danced in Finland by upper secondary school students in their prom Vanhojen tanssit.

== See also ==
- List of Scottish country dances
