= Glasgow Orpheus Choir =

Scottish choir

During the 1947 tour, on Schiphol Airport

The Glasgow Orpheus Choir was founded in Glasgow, Scotland in 1906 by Hugh S. Roberton (1874–1952), before closing in 1951 upon his retirement. It was well-regarded as a choir, and set new standards.

== Origins ==
The world-famous choir started in a Glasgow basement hall, and originated as the Toynbee Musical Association, (Note: Toynbee Musical Association also listed as Toynbee House Musical Association.) with just thirty members which had been created in 1901 by Roberton when he was 26. He was inspired to create a choir when watching the conductors at the 1901 Glasgow International Exhibition.

The Glasgow Orpheus Choir came to be considered without peer in Britain, and it toured widely while enjoying world acclaim. Roberton expected the highest standards of performance from its members. Its voice was a choir voice, and individual voices were not tolerated. He set new standards in choral technique and interpretation. The choir pioneered work of juvenile choral singing.

=== Management ===
Vice-president of the choir from 1926–51 was John Smeaton Smith. Roberton was knighted in the 1931 New Year Honours], for services rendered to British music.

== Activities ==
The Orpheus Choir repertoire included many Scottish folk songs arranged for choral performance (including Dashing White Sergeant, Dumbarton's Drums, and Eriskay Love Lilt), and paraphrases, as well as Italian madrigals, English motets and the music of the Russian Orthodox Church. The choir performed the works of Johann Sebastian Bach, George Frideric Handel, Felix Mendelssohn, Peter Cornelius, Johannes Brahms and others. Correspondingly, composers wrote works for the choir, including Edward Elgar and Granville Bantock.

An early concert in March 1907 saw the choir engage French operatic mezzo-soprano Antonia Dolores to provide her artistic versatility with the choir's "own united abilities".

The Glasgow Orpheus Choir's first London performance was in 1908.

In 1921, the "outspoken" famous conductor was attacked for not having the choir sing "God save the King" at concerts, for which he responded that his first order of business was to provide music, and that an omission of the national anthem meant nothing other than it did not have musical purpose to the concert; that this did not make him anti-Royal, as much as not singing "The Red Flag" made him anti-Socialist, or to sing the Jacobite "White Cockade" was anti-Georgian, "Scots wha hae" as anti-English, or enjoying "Tristan" was pro-German. (A plebiscite found only 2 of London's 60 leading concerts did sing the national anthem.)

In tribute to English tenor Gervase Elwes (1866–1921) after his unexpected death, the choir instituted the Gervase Elwes Silver Medal.

The 1924 Glasgow Competition Festival saw fourteen prize-winning Orpheus or former-Orpheus conductors. Seventy voices visited London and gave a number of concerts, and were invited on Saturday 24 May 1924 for a private recital before the prime minister Ramsay MacDonald and forty others:

the programme ranged from Scottish Psalm tunes like "French" (at the special request of Mr. Macdonald) to ballads like "Kirkconel Lea" and excellent old songs like "My Jo Janet" and "There's Nae Luck About the House." Even Scotsmen are inclined to forget how great a treasury they possess of Scottish lyrics. Scottish songs have been admired by Mozart and imitated by Mendelssohn, and they have the supreme advantage that poetry and music are in perfect harmony.

In 1924, the Junior Orpheus Choir held its first competition and, the following year, sold out the nearly-3000 seat Saint Andrew's Hall concert.

In mid-1929, the choir performed at an informal concert at Balmoral Castle before King George V. Their music did not always appeal to all, with criticism in 1929 of the 100-strong trained voices: while they "make the very most of a not too distinguished type of choral music... they sing only rarely the great madrigals or any other of the more elaborate and, therefore, more exacting examples of classical choral music", sticking mostly to Scottish airs.

By 1931, the choir had 140 singers who maintained a rehearsal attendance rate of 95%. This resulted in a waiting list and probationer classes.

At the burial of the ashes of former prime minister MacDonald at Lossiemouth on Saturday, 27 November 1937, Roberton and the choir "led the singing from the verandah", and also the subsequent family service.

In December 1940 during World War II, the choir was banned from broadcasting by the BBC and use of its facilities because Roberton's pacifist views, and "[t]he B.B.C. does not, in wartime, invite to the microphone anyone publicly known to be opposed to the national war effort". He responded by pointing out that "broadcasting a speaker's views and broadcasting the singing of a choir" were not synonymous. By June 1941, the BBC removed its ban, with the choir magazine noting "We have established once and for all the principle of non-political discrimination in matters of art".

December 1945 saw the choir filling the 6000 seat capacity of the Albert Hall. Immediately after the war, the choir toured Germany to "magnificent receptions". The choir participated in the 1947 Edinburgh International Festival.

Travels overseas occurred with the choir going to Europe and North America. The choir provided the backing for several movies, including the 1945 I Know Where I'm Going! romantic comedy. Phonograph records of the choir were gifted to the Soviet government in 1952 to the Russian Society for Cultural Relations with Foreign Countries.

Of the choir's 1223 concerts, 1213 of them were conducted by Roberton. For all its years, Orpheus concert attendance was by completing a form for a ticket allotted by preferential ballot.

== Demise ==
The toll was showing in 1950 on the 82-year-old Roberton, during the Edinburgh Festival when the choir packed the Usher Hall. The choir disbanded in 1951 on his retirement caused by his ill-health, following a unanimous resolution. This saved Roberton's successor to feel to be under Roberton's shadow. BBC's Scottish Studios hosted a farewell broadcast in August 1951. Its final public performance was in a London concert hall in early 1952. (Note: There was also an April 1951 London concert, "packed with old favorites"; but it is taken to be there was a final performance in 1952.)

Roberton parted with:

They have been 60 strenuous years, but fruitful and happy ones, and I look back with infinite pleasure and few regrets.

The void was immediately replaced by the Glasgow Phoenix Choir, led by Peter Mooney (1915–1983).

=== Legacy ===
A film was made and self-titled The Glasgow Orpheus Choir, and included projected in movie cinemas in Australia.

The choir produced a number of phonograph records including titles of Crimond, and The Isle of Mull.
