= Eriskay =

Island of the Outer Hebrides in Scotland

Èirisgeigh (Gaelic)
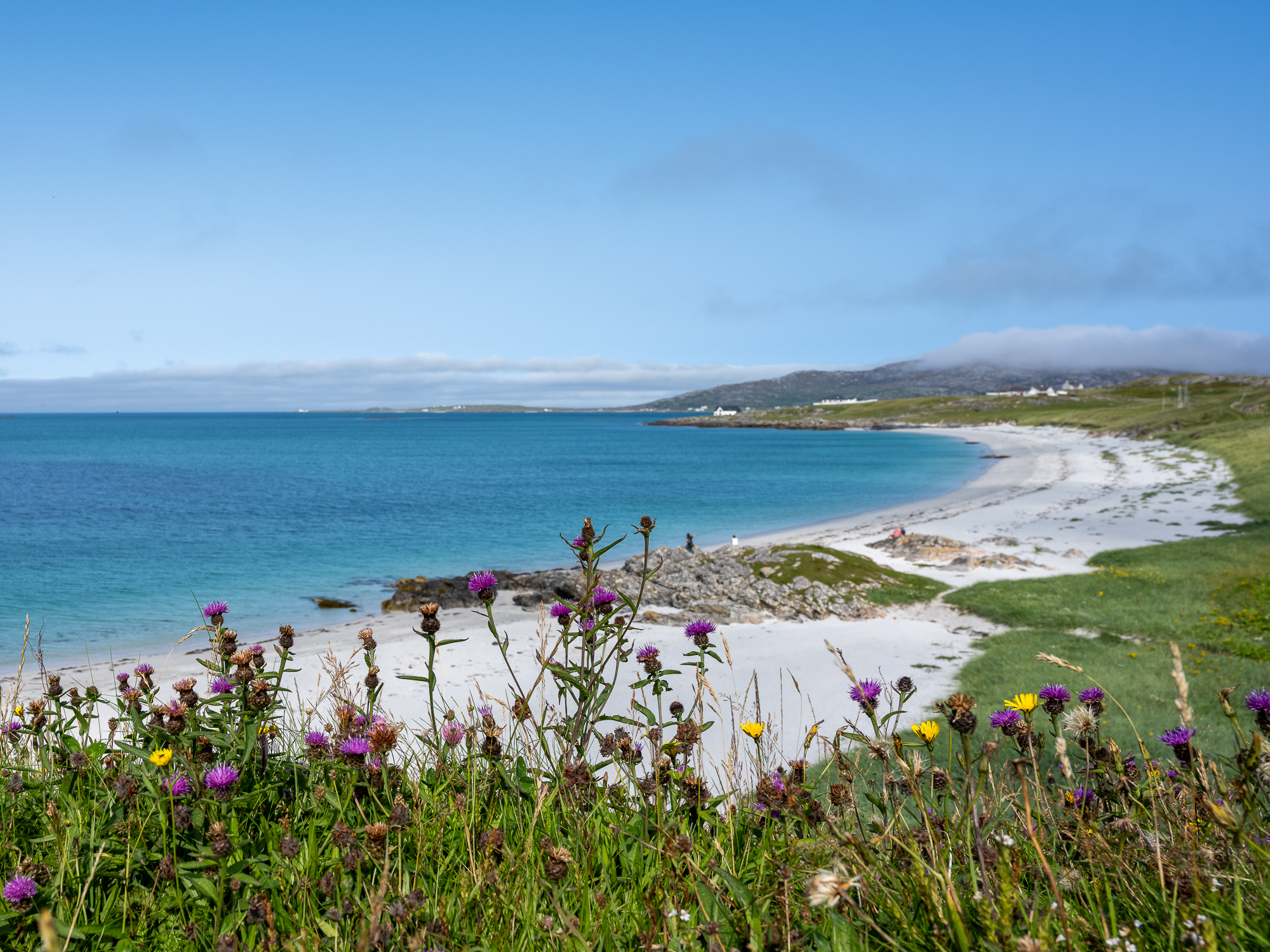

Location
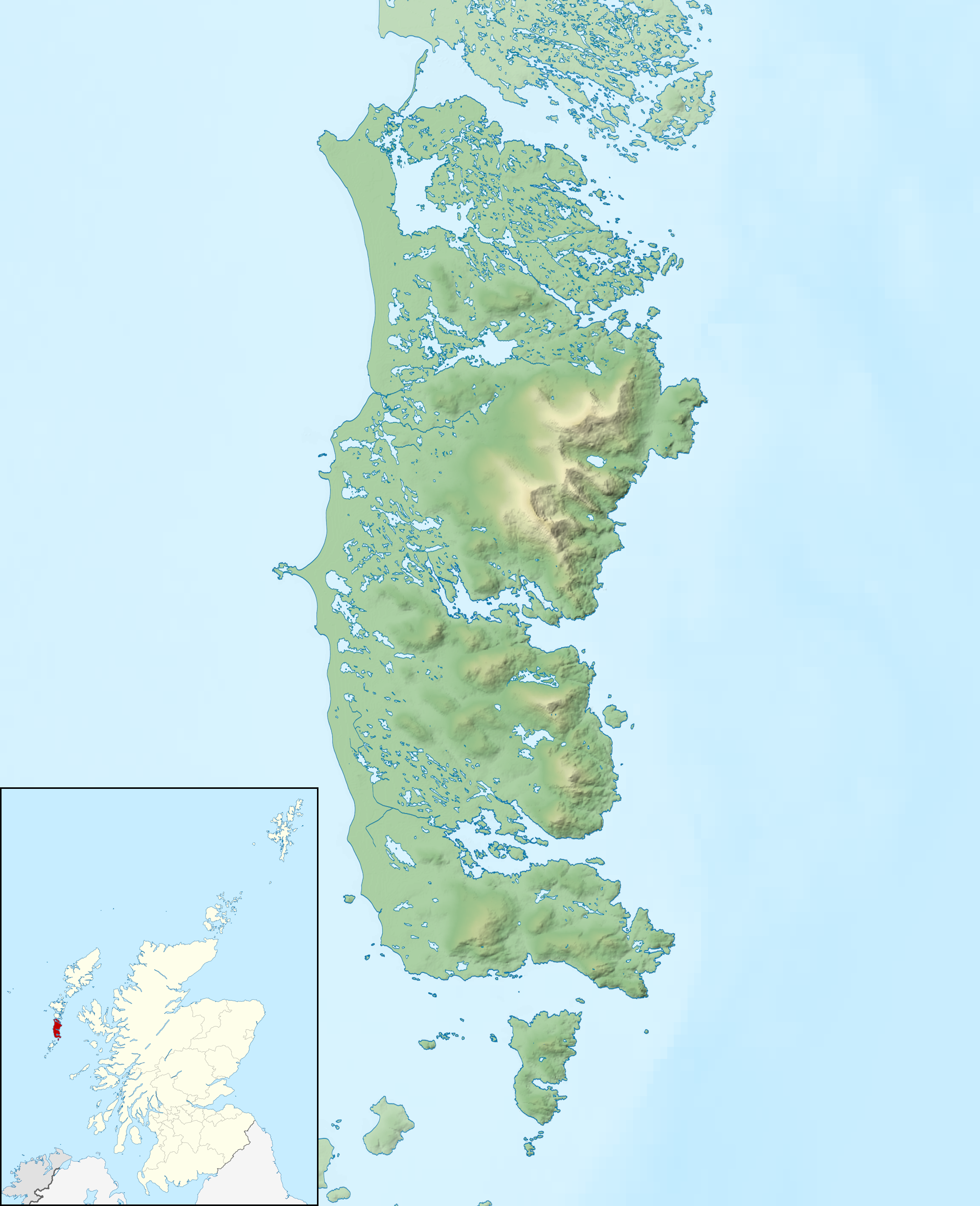
- Eriskay shown next to South Uist Eriskay shown within the Outer Hebrides
- OS grid reference: NF795104
- Coordinates: 57.07°N 7.29°W

Name
- Gaelic pronunciation: [ˈeɾʲiʃkʲej]
- Name meaning: Eric's Isle
- Old Norse name: Eiríksey

Physical geography
- Island group: Uist and Barra
- Area: 703 ha (2 3/4 sq mi)
- Area rank: 63
- Highest elevation: Beinn Sgrithean 185.6 m (609 ft)

Administration
- Council area: Comhairle nan Eilean Siar
- Country: Scotland
- Sovereign state: United Kingdom

Demographics
- Population: 158
- Population rank: 38
- Population density: 22.5/km^{2} (58/sq mi)

Eriskay (Scottish Gaelic: Èirisgeigh), from the Old Norse for "Eric's Isle", is an island and community council area of the Outer Hebrides in northern Scotland with a population of 160. It lies between South Uist and Barra and is connected to South Uist by a causeway which was opened in 2001. In the same year Ceann a' Ghàraidh in Eriskay became the ferry terminal for travelling between South Uist and Barra. The Caledonian MacBrayne vehicular ferry travels between Eriskay and Ardmore in Barra. The crossing takes around 40 minutes.

== Geography ==
Eriskay and surrounding islands

The island is about 2 1/2 by 1 1/2 miles or 4 by 2.5 kilometres. It is associated with the Eriskay Pony and the Eriskay jersey (made without any seams). There is a shop, a community centre and a local history museum.

== History ==
=== The Jacobite rising of 1745 ===
At the start of the Jacobite rising of 1745, the privateer Du Teillay arrived at Eriskay On 2 August 1745 and temporarily put Prince Charles Edward Stuart and the Seven Men of Moidart ashore. The sandy beach where the prince first set foot upon Scottish soil is called in his honour Coilleag a' Phrionnsa ("The Cockleshell Strand of the Prince").

In 1995, a memorial cairn was erected with an inscription that includes the first stanza of Alasdair Mac Mhaighstir Alasdair's song-poem Òran Eile don Phrionnsa:

=== 19th century ===
According to the Napier Commission testimony of local resident John McCaskill, as recently as the 1830s and 1840s there had been only three families resident on Eriskay, and fewer than 30 people.

The population then grew as a result of the Highland Clearances. The estate factors considered Eriskay "agriculturally worthless", and accordingly used the island as a dumping ground for evicted tenants from the many other islands owned by Colonel John Gordon throughout the Sound of Barra and the southern Outer Hebrides.

For the most part, the newly arrived islanders of Eriskay were ahherents of the Roman Catholic Church and had their family roots in South Uist. Even so, for decades after Catholic Emancipation in 1829, there was still no resident Roman Catholic priest in Eriskay, and the island was largely served by visiting priests from St Peter's Roman Catholic Church at Daliburgh, South Uist. They had to walk down to "The Priests' Point" along the south coast and kindle a bonfire as a signal for Eriskay fishermen to sail over and ferry them across the sound. The first Roman Catholic church on Eriskay, St Michael's, was said to have been built in 1852, "shortly after the arrival of hundreds of evictees from South Uist and elsewhere. It was no more than a big stone crofthouse, a single-storey rectangle, at first with a thatch and later with a corrugated iron roof". The current St Michael's Roman Catholic Church stands atop Cnoc nan Sgrath, a hill overlooking the main village on Eriskay. It was built with stones and homemade mortar by the local population. The site of the 1852 stone chapel is now marked by a Marian shrine with a statue of Our Lady of Fatima, overlooking the Sound of Barra.

In his 19th century song poem Eilein na h-Òige ("Island of the Young"), Allan MacDonald praises the beauty of Eriskay, its wildlife, and the fondness of its people for telling tales from the Fenian Cycle of Celtic mythology inside the ceilidh house. He also commented upon the visits to Eriskay by Saint Columba, Iain Mùideartach (chief of Clanranald), and Prince Charles Edward Stuart.

=== Fishing ===
The Annual Reports of the Fishery Board for Scotland provide an insight into the state of fishing from Eriskay in the years before the First World War. The catch typically consisted of mackerel and lobsters.

Fishery Statistics

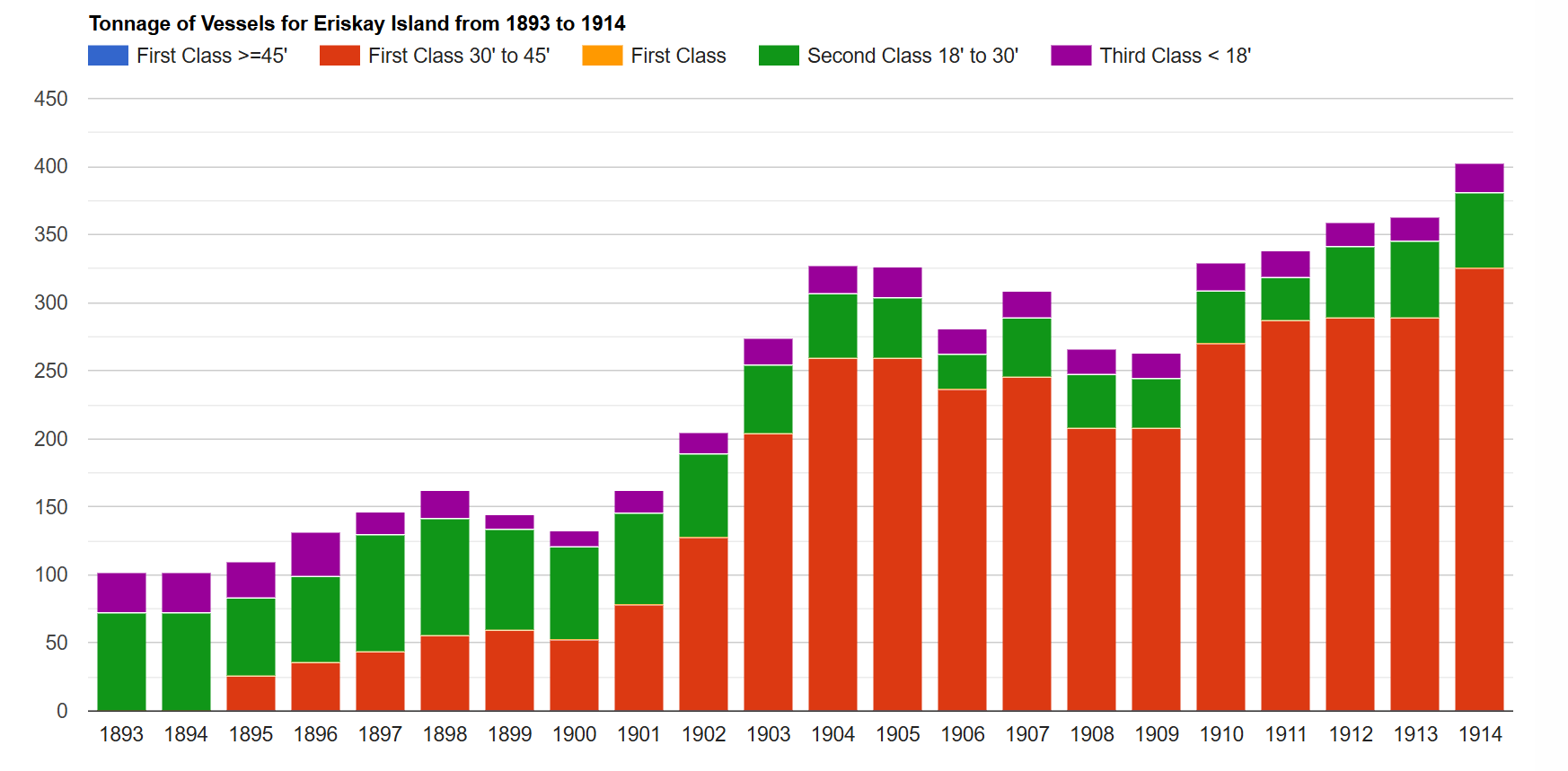
Tonnage of vessels

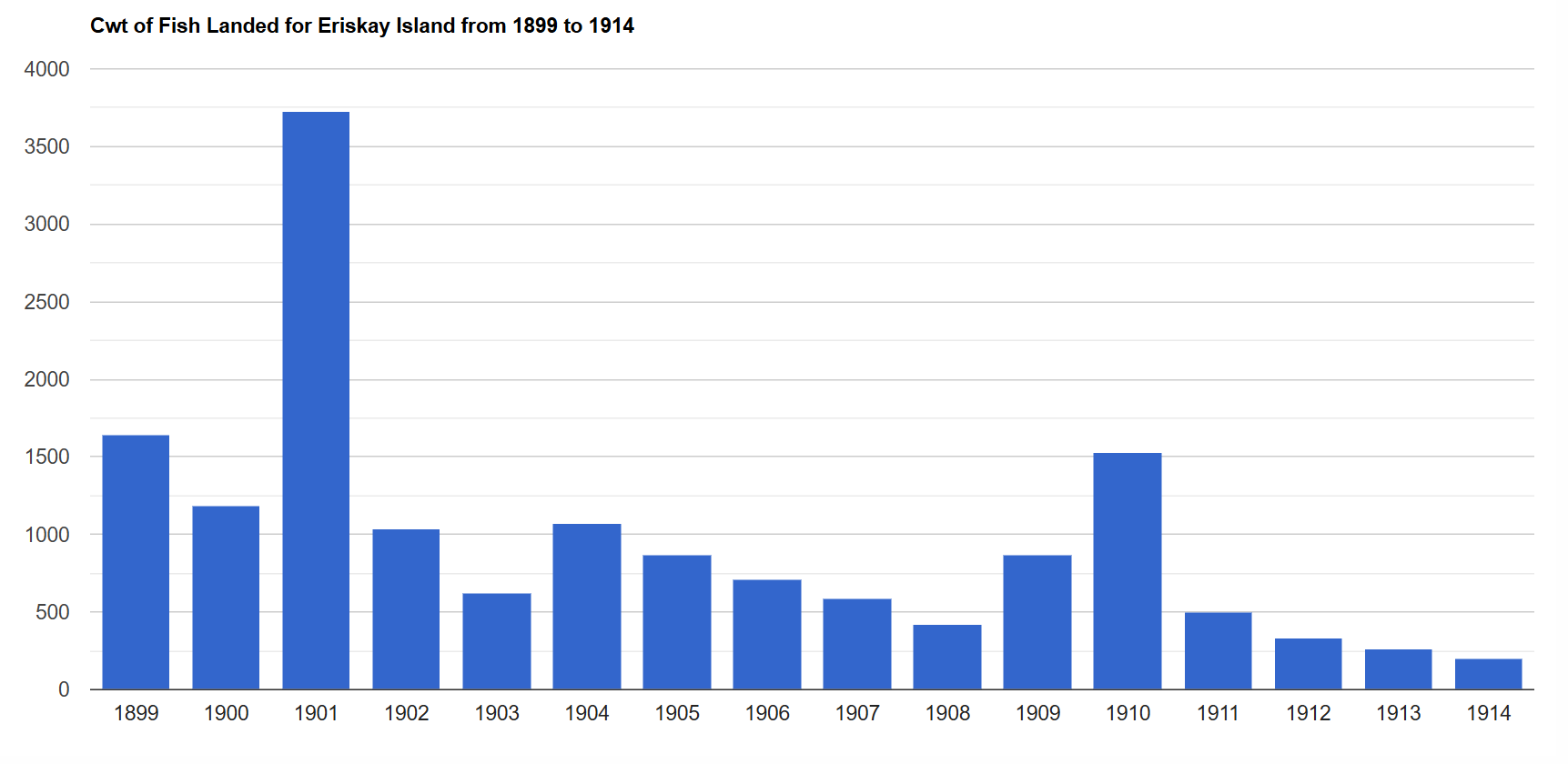
Cwt of fish landed

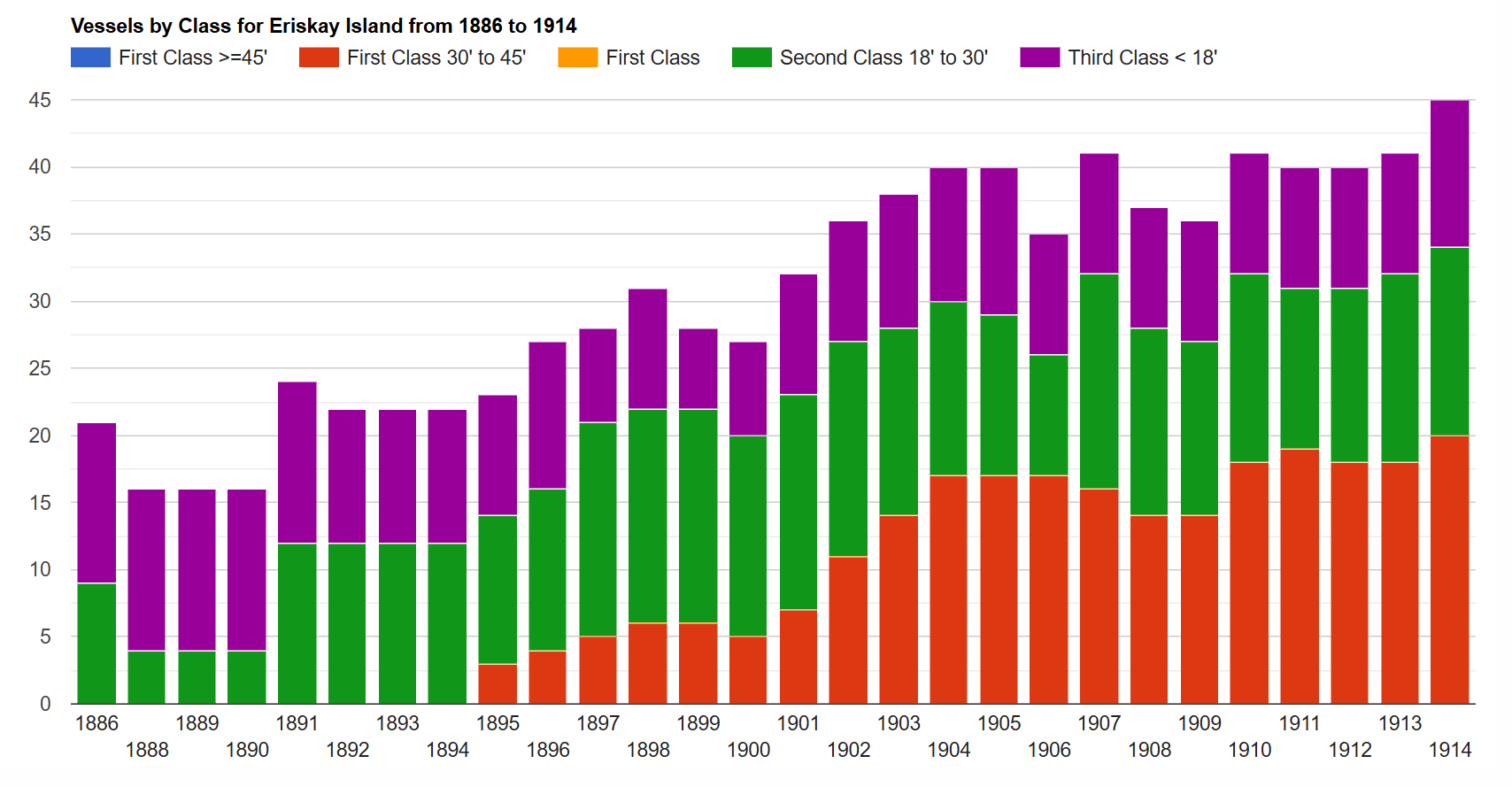
Vessels by class

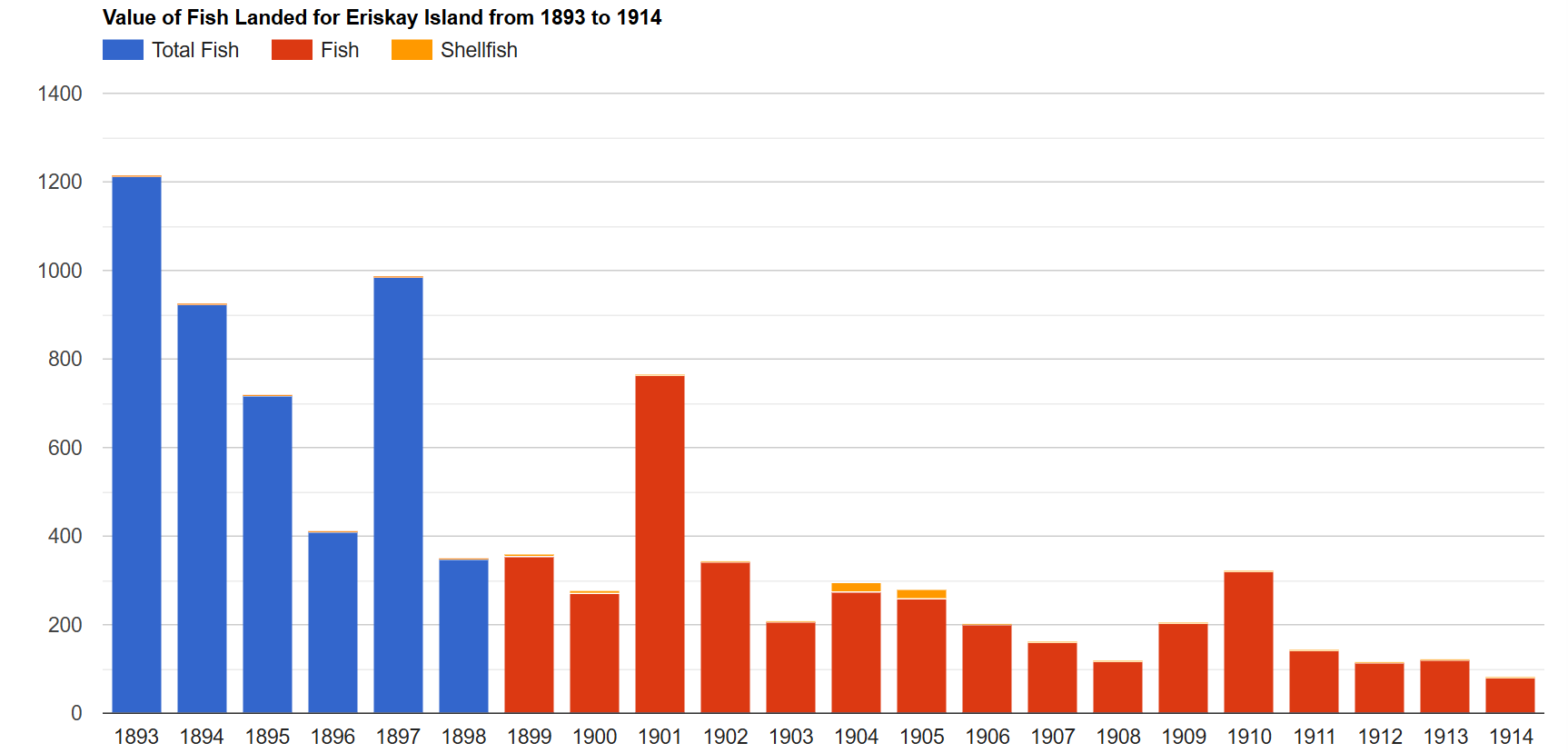
Value (£) of fish landed

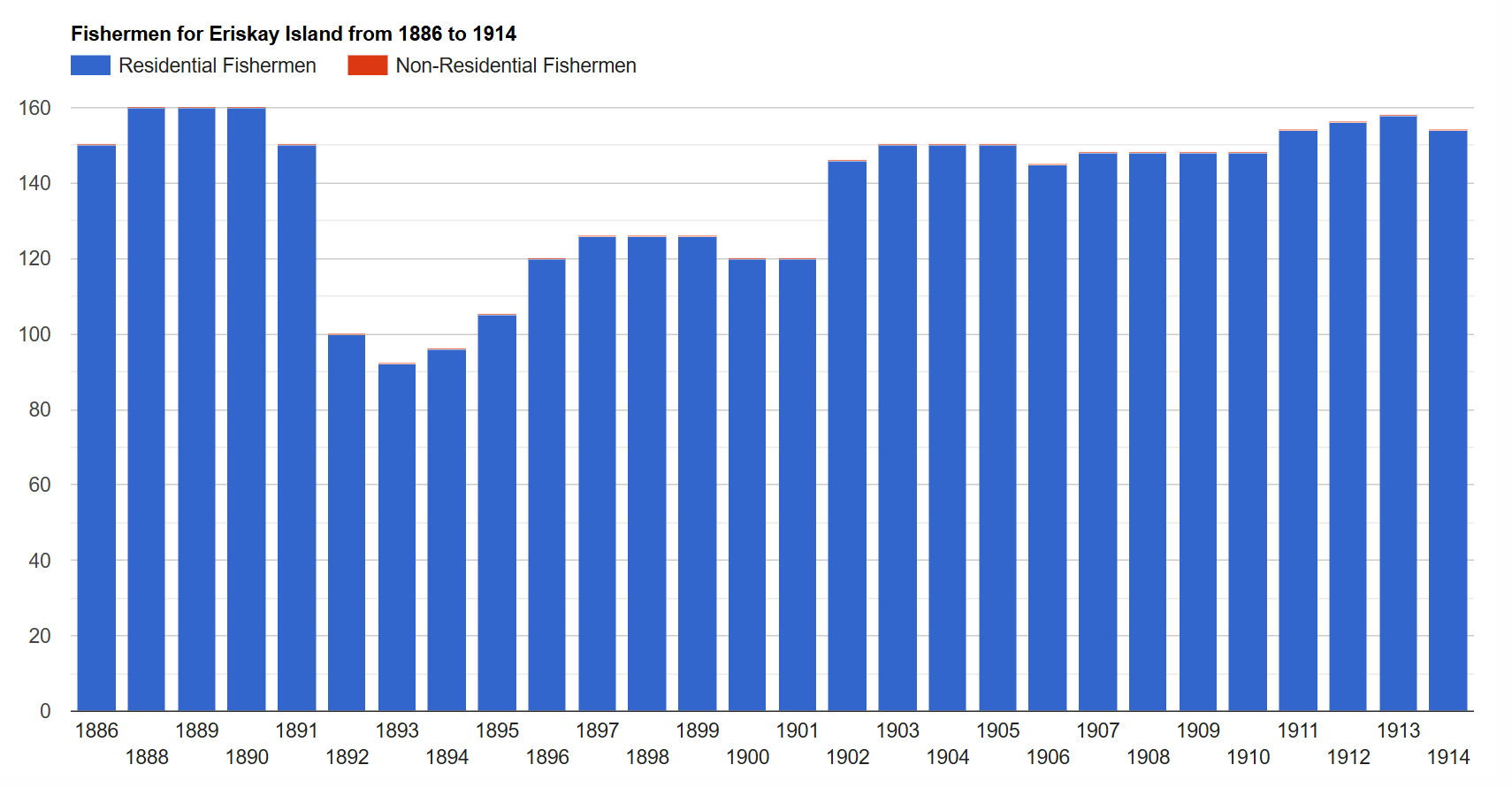
Fishermen

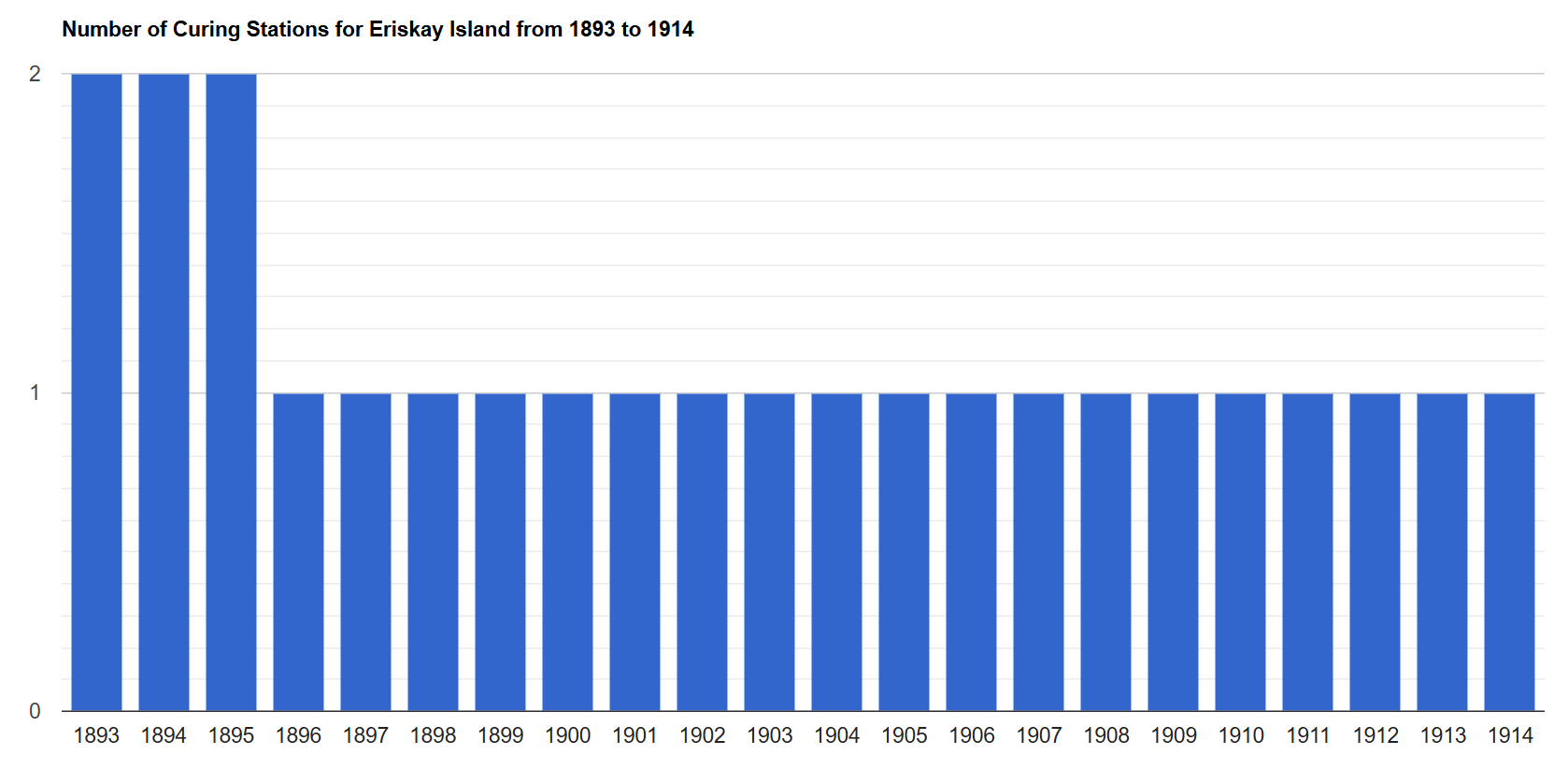
Number of curing stations

=== 20th century ===
Eriskay: A Poem of Remote Lives, a documentary made in 1934 by early German documentary filmmaker Werner Kissling, was filmed on the island and consists of 15 minutes and 40 seconds of silent, black-and-white footage. An introduction was added, as well as a sound track featuring narration, Scottish traditional music, waulking songs, and recorded conversations in Scottish Gaelic. Kissling's film formed the centre-piece of a "Hebridean Evening", hosted at the Marquess of Londonderry’s London residence, on Tuesday, 30 April 1935, in the presence of the Prince of Wales, Queen Mary of Teck, Prime Minister of the United Kingdom Ramsay MacDonald, Macleod of Macleod and Cameron of Lochiel. The funds raised were used to build Eriskay’s first major road, running from the old pier at Na Hann in the north to the harbour at Acairseid in the south. While the roads have long since been upgraded, part of the old road, which is named Rathad Kissling ("Kissling Street") in the filmmaker's honour, still survives near Acairseid.

"Am Politician" Lounge Bar in Na Hann is named after the SS Politician which ran aground off the island's coast in 1941. The accident provided the whole island with a generous supply of free whisky in defiance of both customs duties and wartime rationing, and subsequently inspired Compton Mackenzie's 1947 comic novel Whisky Galore! and its 1949 film adaptation.

During the 1930s, 40s, and 50s, an audio archive of Hebridean mythology and folklore and stories about local history from the Eriskay oral tradition were recorded by island schoolmaster Donald MacDonald and by Calum Maclean, both of whom were in the employ of Prof. Séamus Ó Duilearga and the Irish Folklore Commission. The recordings have since been digitised and made available online through the Tobar an Dualchais – Kist o Riches website.

Prince Charles and Princess Diana visited Eriskay during their tour of the Western Isles in July 1985.

=== 21st century ===
After a protracted campaign, local residents took control of the island on 30 November 2006 in a community buy-out. The previous landowners, a sporting syndicate, sold the assets of the 372-square-kilometre (144 sq mi) estate including Benbecula, South Uist and Eriskay for £4.5 million to a community-owned organisation known as Stòras Uibhist, which was set up to purchase the land and to manage it in perpetuity. In 2018, legal issues around governance from the buyout were reported.

Comann Eachdraidh Eirisgeidh ("The Eriskay Historical Society") was established in 2010 and, as of 2021, had recently purchased the island's schoolhouse, which had been closed down since 2013, to turn it into a local history and heritage museum. In honour of Allan MacDonald, the Society has also established "Maighstir Ailein's Poetry Trail", a hiking trail where particularly scenic locations are accompanied by bilingual and laminated verses in boxes of the priest-poet's poem, Eilein na h-Òige ("Isle of Youth").

== Transport ==
Eriskay is traversed by a number of mountain paths and tracks, and has just a single motor road. The first stretch of that road was built in 1935, funded through proceeds from the first showing in London of the Werner Kissling film.

There is a regular bus service on the island which forms part of the "Spine Route" between Eriskay Slipway and Berneray via South Uist, Benbecula and North Uist. Services are provided by DA Travel with funding from Comhairle nan Eilean Siar.

In 2009, the previous primitive quay facilities at the excellent natural harbour of Acarsaid Mhòr were extended and modernised, with improved vehicular access. Some smaller fishing boats continue—at least when the tides and weather are favourable—to use the shelving bay at Haun (from the Viking for 'harbour'—but scarcely with sufficient shelter to constitute a harbour in practice). Acarsaid Mhòr is also used by visiting yachts.

== Culture ==
=== Crofting ===
Following the establishment of the first Crofting Commission in the 1880s, the whole of the island, together with the small adjoining Stack Island, was incorporated into the crofting townships:

Name of township	Numbers of	
Name of township	Crofts	Shares
Acarsaid Mhòr	14	10
Am Baile (Balla)	16	15
Bun a' Mhuillinn	10	10
Coilleag	10	10
Na Hann (Haun)	6	4
Na Pàirceannan (Parks)	4	4
Roisinis (Roshinish)	4	6
Rudha Bàn	9	5
Total	73	64

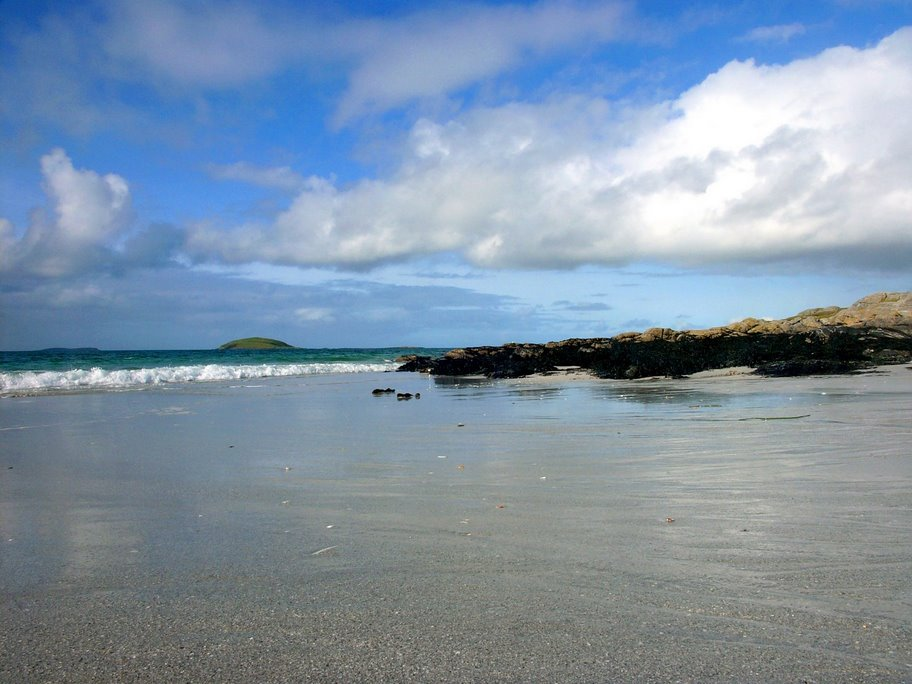
The Eriskay shore

The souming (a word originating in the Viking era) for each full share gives the right to put, on the common grazings (the high ground of Beinn Sgrithean and Beinn Stac), ten sheep, two cows and one Eriskay Pony (all plus their 'followers'—young up to one year old). Most crofts have one full share, but many have a half share, and a few have two shares, and one croft has as many as 3 shares.

The crofts are small (typically five hectares or less) and the land is rocky and exposed to harsh weather. These days, very few crofts are actively worked: there is little economic return in relation to the effort, and although there is a strong cultural attachment to the land, the demands and distractions of modern life leave little time for tending livestock and manual work. Much of the best grazing land, the machair of the north west of the island, has been compromised by house-building and the increasing opposition to the free-range grazing of cattle and sheep during the winter. Now, the most actively worked crofts are in the township of Bun a' Mhuillinn.

The island's common grazings, and the grazing of croft inbye land during the winter months, are regulated by the Eriskay Grazings Committee, the members of which serve a three-year term, supported by a Grazings Clerk, and according to the Grazings Regulations as provided for in the Crofting Acts.

=== Music ===
The Eriskay Love Lilt is a version by Marjorie Kennedy-Fraser of the Gaelic folk song Gràdh geal mo chridhe, collected by her on the island.

=== Emigration and population ===
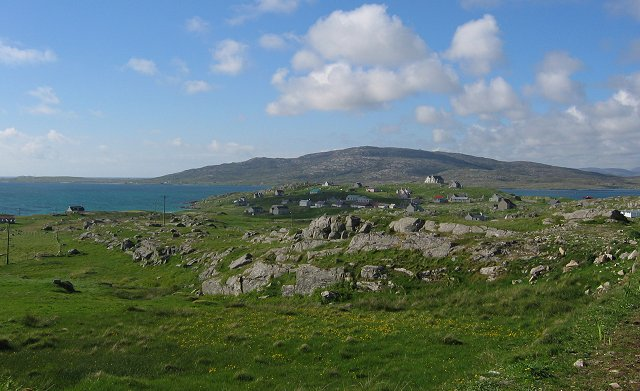
Eriskay, looking north towards Easabhal on South Uist

Many Eriskay families have had to leave the island in recent years in search of work and some historic island families have few or no descendants left on the island. The island's population was 143, as recorded by the 2011 census —an increase of 7.5% since 2001, when there were 133 usual residents. During the same period Scottish island populations as a whole grew by 4% to 103,702. By 2022 the population had grown further to 158.

== Tourism ==
As of 2010 there were no hotels, two or three bed-and-breakfast establishments, and until recently few self-catering cottages or houses. Since the completion in 2001 of the causeway to South Uist and the inauguration of the vehicle ferry to Barra, a number of properties have been professionally renovated or purpose-built as holiday accommodation. The machair and beaches from Coilleag a' Phrionnsa to Rudha Bàn are increasingly popular with visitors travelling with their motor-homes.

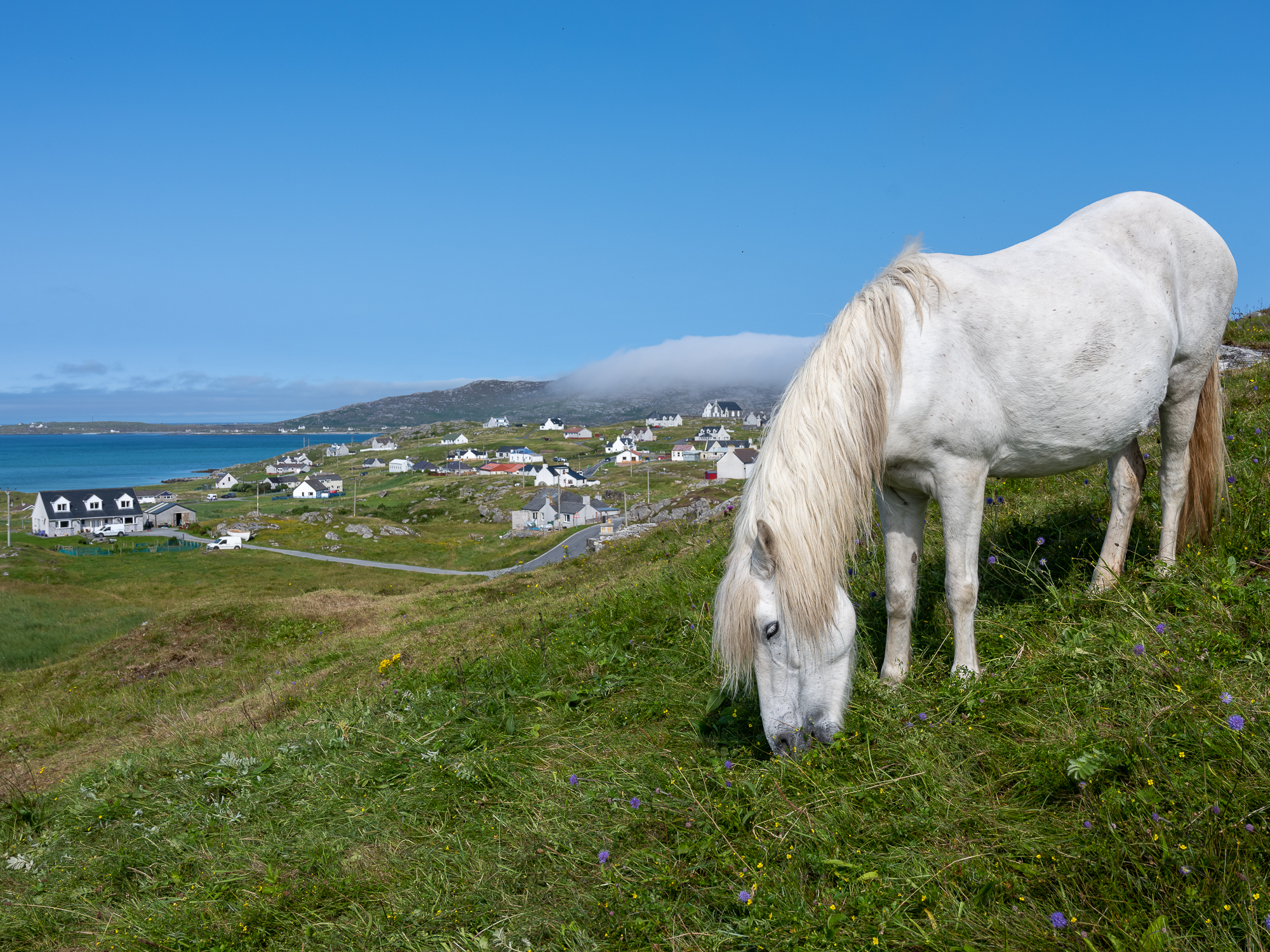
Eriskay pony with the coastal village of Rubha Ban and the Isle of South Uist in the background.

The island is home to a herd of Eriskay Ponies owned and maintained by members of Comann Each nan Eilean – The Eriskay Pony Society, founded in 1972. The ponies are bound by crofting regulations and are brought to the hill grazings in spring, and back down into the township for the winter. They graze and roam around the island to whichever part is most comfortable depending on the climate. Although the ponies have a laid-back temperament and are accustomed to humans, they should be approached with care and visitors should refrain from feeding them, as this can be harmful to the animals.

== Wildlife ==
Sea bindweed, which is not native to the Hebrides, grows on the island. Its presence there is said to stem from the arrival of the "Bonnie Prince", who accidentally dropped the seeds when he pulled a handkerchief from his pocket.

== Notable people ==
- Allan MacDonald (1859–1905), a Roman Catholic priest poet and activist for crofters' rights, died and was buried on Eriskay.

== See also ==
- List of islands of Scotland
