= List of Scottish country dances =

There are more than 15,000 documented Scottish country dances; only some frequently danced or otherwise notable ones are listed here.

Dances are marked with the music and dance styles used: R8×32 3C/4 means a Reel of 32 bars repeated 8 times for 3 couples in a set of 4 couples in a longwise set. The letters for the music styles are: R reel; J jig; P polka; S strathspey; W waltz.

- Anniversary Reel – R4×32 4C set – Sheila Muir 1987
- Awa', Whigs, Awa' (R8×32) 3C (4C set) Hugh Foss Dances to Song Tunes
- The Bees of Maggieknockater – J4×32 4C set – John Drewry 1975
- The Belle of Bon Accord – S4×32 4C set – John Drewry 1981
- Blooms of Bon Accord – R4×32 4C set – John Drewry 1971
- Bratach Bana – J8×32 3C/4 – John Drewry 1964
- Clutha – R4×48 Square set – unknown 1890
- Canadian Barn Dance -
- Dashing White Sergeant – 32 bar reel 3 facing 3 round the room – unknown
- The De'il Amang the Tailors – R8×32 3C/4 – unknown
- The Dream Catcher – S96 Square set – Eileen Orr
- The Duke and Duchess of Edinburgh – R8×40 3C/4 – Allie Anderson & Florence Lesslie
- The Duke of Atholl's Reel – J8×32 3C/4 – Skillern 1776
- The Duke of Perth – R8×32 3C/4 – unknown 1827
- The Earl of Mansfield – R4×48 4C – John Drewry 1980
- The Eightsome reel – R40+8×48+40 Square set – unknown 1870
- Fergus McIver (a.k.a. Waverley) – J8×48 3C/4 – Button and Whittaker 1812
- Flowers of Edinburgh – R8×32 3C/4 Hornpipe – unknown
- The Frisky – J8×32 3C/4 – Robert Bremner
- Gay Gordons – 16 bar round the room march – unknown
- Hamilton House – J8×32 3C/4 – William Campbell 1789
- Hooper's Jig – J8×32 3C/4 – unknown
- Ian Powrie's Farewell to Auchterarder – J128 Square set – Bill Hamilton
- Joie de Vivre – J8×32 3C/4 – Irene van Maarseveen
- The Haymakers (a.k.a. Sir Roger de Coverley) – 48 bar 9/8 jig – unknown
- Inverneill House – R8×32 3C/4 – John Drewry 1986
- The Irish Rover – R8×32 3C/4 – James B Cosh
- J.B. Milne – R8×32 3C/4 – Hugh Foss 1954
- Jennifer's Jig – J8×32 3C/4 – John Drewry 1968
- MacDonald of the Isles – S3×32 3C – Derek Haynes
- The Machine without horses – J8×32 3C/4 – Rutherford 1772
- Mairi's Wedding – R8×40 3C/4 – James B. Cosh 1959 (See also Wedding music)
- Major Ian Stewart – J8×32 3C/4 – John Drewry 1986
- Maxwell's Rant – R8×32 3C/4 – Rutherford 1752
- Miss Johnstone of Ardrossan – R5×32 5C – Roy Goldring 2000
- Mrs Stewart's Jig – J8×32 3C/4 – Frans Ligtmans 1986
- The Minister on the Loch – S3×32 3C – Roy Goldring
- The Montgomeries’ Rant – R8×32 3C/4 – Castle Menzies 1749
- Monymusk – S8×32 3C/4 – Preston 1786
- Napier's Index – J8×40 3C/4 – Brian Charlton 2001
- Neidpath Castle – S3×32 3C – Derek Haynes
- Pelorus Jack – J8×32 3C/4 – Barry Skelton 1993
- Petronella – R8×32 2C/4 – unknown 1808
- Postie’s Jig – J4×32 4C – Roy Clowes
- Quarries' Jig – J8×32 3C/4 – Kent W Smith
- The Reel of the Royal Scots – R8×32 3C/4 – Roy Goldring 1983
- The Reel of the 51st Division – R8×32 3C/4 – James Edward McCartney Atkinson 1940
- Rest and Be Thankful – R8×32 3C/4 – unknown
- The Robertson Rant – S80 Square – Mrs Douglas Winchester 1949
- The Sailor – R8×32 3C/4 – unknown
- Scottish Reform – J8×32 2C/4 – unknown
- Shiftin’ Bobbins – R8×32 3C/4 – Roy Clowes
- Speed the Plough (Inverness Country Dance) – R8×32 3C/4 – unknown
- Strip the Willow – 40 or 56 bar jig in either 6/8 or 9/8 time (in 9/8 it is also known as "Drops of Brandy") – unknown
- Sugar Candie – S8×32 3C/4 – unknown
- Swiss Lassie – R8×32 3C/4 – Rosi Betschi
- A Trip to Bavaria – R4×32 4C – James MacGregor-Brown
- Up in the Air – S8×32 3C/4 – Boag 1797
- Virginia Reel -R4×40 4C – unknown
- The Wee Cooper o' Fife – J8×40 2C/4 (10 bar phrases) – Hugh Foss
- West's Hornpipe – R4×32 4C – unknown 1797
- The White Heather Jig – J4×40 4C – James B Cosh
- The Wild Geese – J8×32 3C/4 – unknown
- Wind on Loch Fyne – S3×32 Triangle – John Bowie Dickson 1986
- The Wind That Shakes the Barley – R8×32 3C/4 – John M Duthie 1961
- Military Two Step

== See also ==
- Scottish highland dance
