= Roman Tavast =

Estonian artist and jeweler

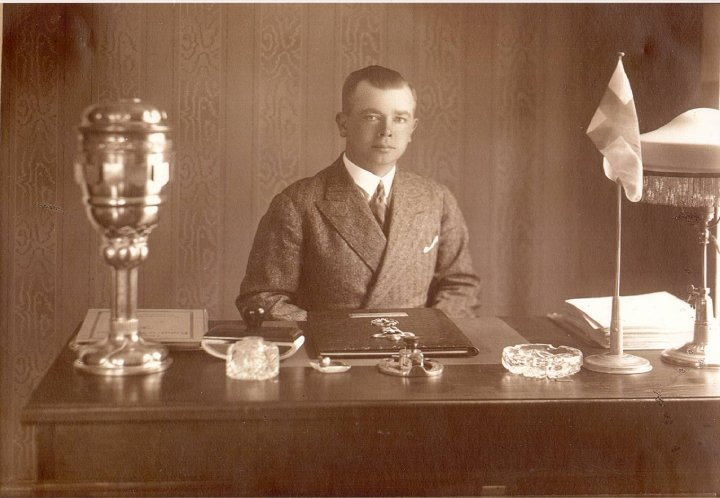
- Tavast present in his office during 1935
- Born: 11 May 1895; Tallinn, Estonia
- Died: 3 August 1942 (aged 47); Sosva, Sverdlovsk Oblast, Soviet Union
- Known for: Sculpture, Jeweler

Roman Tavast (May 11, 1895, Tallinn, Estonia - August 3, 1942, Sosva, Soviet Union) was an Estonian artist, jeweler, and businessman. He was the owner of a jewelry factory in Tallinn.

== Biography ==
Roman Tavast was born in Tallinn in 1895. He was born into a fisherman's family. Tavast graduated from Niklasen's 4-year private school and studied engraving as well as goldsmithing in E. Treder's workshop. He had also worked for the goldsmith Julius Lossman, learned the art of gilding, and later completed courses at an art school. He graduated from evening high school to get a general education. Tavast then started his independent activities after the Estonian War of Independence. In 1920, Roman Tavast had provided himself with a one-seater goldsmith's workbench, and in 1921, a wire rolling machine. In 1923, at the age of 28, he opened his own independent company for the production of badges, medals and other honors and awards - VMT Roman Tavast. Following the occupation of Estonia and the creation of the Estonian SSR in 1940, the factory and the residential building with the store were nationalized in 1940. Karl Johanson was appointed as the new director of the factory. Roman Tavast worked as a technical manager at the factory until June 1941, when he was deported to the Vorkuta camp system in the Russian North.

Roman Tavast was sentenced to death and shot in 1942 in Sosva, Sverdlovsk Oblast, Soviet Union.
