= Champagne Brimoncourt =

French champagne producer

Brimoncourt is a champagne producer founded in Aÿ in Marne, France, in 2008.

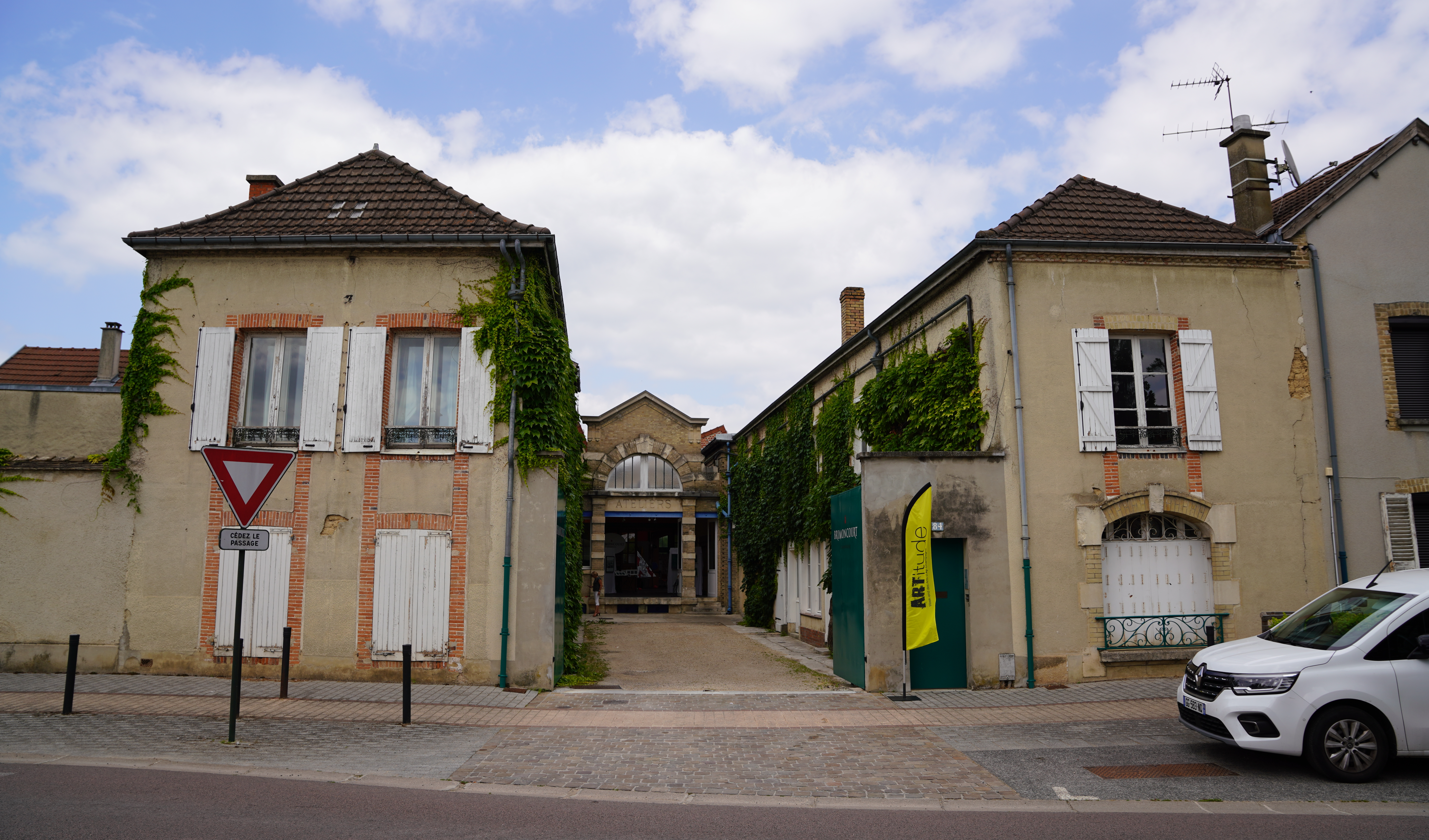

== History ==
The company was founded by Alexandre Cornot and has agreements with grape producers. It is based in Aÿ, the centre of the Champagne region, where it occupies 3,000 square metres (32,000 sq ft) of space in 18th- and 19th-century buildings and gardens, in part constructed by the Eiffel company and classified as part of the industrial heritage of the region.

== Cuvées ==
Brimoncourt produces three cuvées for sale:

- Brut Régence
- Brut Rosé
- Blanc de Blancs
