= Strip the willow =

Country dance

Strip the willow is a ceilidh dance. It has variations depending upon whether it is being performed as a movement in a larger dance or a complete dance in itself.

== Description ==
The form described here is that commonly used as part of a Scottish ceilidh dance.

The dancers form a longways set (a row of gentlemen facing their partners, a row of ladies) of four couples. The 'objective' is to move the top couple to the bottom of the set, and the other couples move up one position. A brief description of the dance would be: The top couple link arms and spin each other for a count of 16, at which point the lady 'strips' down the line of men alternating left-handed anti-clockwise swings with someone else's partner right-handed clockwise half-turn swings with their partner working steadily down the set, the gentleman at this point swinging only with his partner. At the bottom, the couple join again and spin for a count of 8, then the gentleman 'strips' up the line of ladies the same as his partner just did, while the lady swings only with the man. At the top of the set, the couple join together and swing for a count of 8 then together they 'strip' down to the bottom, alternately swinging the other partners down the line and meeting to swing each other between people. At the bottom they meet one last time to swing for 8 beats, while the next top couple meet and swing for 16 and follow the steps above.

Thus if the set is (lower case ladies, upper case gentlemen):

a	b	c	d
A	B	C	D

the movements are: (down)

- Clockwise whole turn A with a for 16 beats.
- Anticlockwise half turn a with B.
- Clockwise half turn A with a.
- Anticlockwise half turn a with C.
- Clockwise half turn A with a.
- Anticlockwise half turn a with D.
- Clockwise whole turn A with a for 8 beats.

(up)

- Anticlockwise half turn A with d.
- Clockwise half turn A with a.
- Anticlockwise half turn A with c.
- Clockwise half turn A with a.
- Anticlockwise half turn A with b.
- Clockwise whole turn A with a for 8 beats.

(down)

- Anticlockwise half turn A with b and a with B.
- Clockwise half turn A with a.
- Anticlockwise half turn A with c and a with C.
- Clockwise half turn A with a.
- Anticlockwise half turn A with d and a with D.
- Clockwise whole turn A with a for 8 beats.

The sets can be as long as the music allows.

Variations include:

- Multiple willow stripping, best done in long sets, with every fourth or fifth couple stripping downwards and everyone else constantly moving upwards. Once a couple reach the top, they wait for the appropriate bar and start another movement. This is the Orcadian version. In many modern Ceilidhs an Orcadian Strip the Willow is the ultimate dance before Auld Lang Syne is sung.

== Music ==
Under the title "Drops of Brandy" the "tunearch" website has 10 transcriptions of the melody. The earliest, dated to 1734 was in manuscript format in David Young's "Drummond Castle/Duke of Perth Manuscript". A more famous collection, O'Neill's "Dance Music of Ireland: 1001 Gems" (1907) has listed it as no 448.

== See also ==
- List of Scottish country dances
