= Imperial and Royal Majesty =

Style for Emperor-Kings and consorts

Imperial and Royal Majesty (abbreviated as HI&RM) was the style used by Emperor-Kings and their consorts as heads of imperial dynasties that were simultaneously royal. The style was notably used by the Emperor of Austria (who was also the King of Hungary and Bohemia) and by the German Emperor (who was also the King of Prussia). The Austrian, German, and Bohemian monarchies were abolished in 1918 while the vacant throne of Hungary continued to exist until the 1940s.

== Examples ==
- In the Austro-Hungarian Empire, the Emperor of Austria also served as King of Hungary and King of Bohemia till the fall of the monarchy in 1918. The Hungarian crown remained in existence but vacant and therefore was ruled by Regent Miklós Horthy until 1946.
- The German Emperor, a specifically chosen title in the federal monarchy of Prussian-dominated Germany, also held the title of King of Prussia from 1871 to the fall of the monarchy in 1918. The two were constitutionally linked, as Emperor Wilhelm II discovered when he attempted to abdicate the Imperial crown while retaining the Prussian crown.
- Napoleon I was also styled Imperial and Royal Majesty between 1805 and 1814 as Emperor of the French and King of Italy.
- John VI of the United Kingdom of Portugal, Brazil and Algarves was styled His Imperial and Royal Majesty, from 1825, when Portugal and Brazil signed the Treaty of Rio de Janeiro, recognizing the Brazilian independence but granting John VI as the titular Emperor of Brazil, until 1826, when he died.
- The monarchs of Austria-Hungary titled "His Imperial and Royal Apostolic Majesty" (Seine Kaiserliche und Königliche Apostolische Majestät) along with his consort Empress Elisabeth, who was styled "Her Imperial and Royal Apostolic Majesty" (Ihre Kaiserliche und Königliche Apostolische Majestät). The plural for the couple was also used as "Their Imperial and Royal Apostolic Majesties" (Ihre Kaiserlichen und Königlichen Apostolischen Majestäten).
- Victor Emmanuel III of Italy claimed the thrones of Ethiopia and Albania as Emperor of Ethiopia (1936–41) and King of the Albanians (1939–43).

== Note ==
- Although British monarchs used the imperial title of Emperor of India between 1876 and 1948, the style Imperial and Royal Majesty was not used, deemed 'clumsy periphrasis' by Benjamin Disraeli.
- Although being known as the King-Emperor, Peter I of Brazil was not styled His Imperial and Royal Majesty, neither His Imperial and Royal Highness, when his father, John VI, died, in 1826. His condition as Emperor of Brazil was not compatible with his title as King of Portugal, neither in Brazil nor in Portugal, and when he was confirmed King by the Portuguese Courts, in 1834, being entitled Peter IV of Portugal, he had already abdicated the Brazilian throne in favor of his son, Pedro of Alcântara, Prince Imperial of Brazil.

== See also ==
- Imperial and Royal Highness
