= Clive Christian Perfume =

Luxury perfume house based in the UK

- Type: Private
- Industry: Cosmetics; Fragrance
- Genre: Cosmetics
- Founded: 1999 in London
- Founder: Clive Christian
- Headquarters: London, England
- Area served: United Kingdom; United States; Middle East; Europe; Russia
- Key people: Amy Nelson-Bennett (Chief Executive)
- Products: Fragrances
- Number of employees: 100+
- Website: www.clivechristian.com

Clive Christian Perfume is a UK-based independent luxury perfume house which sells products through its online store, at Harrods, Selfridges, and Fortnum & Mason in the UK as well as globally throughout America, Europe, Russia and the Middle East.

== History ==
The Clive Christian perfume house was established in 1999, when Clive Christian purchased the Crown Perfumery Company. The Crown Perfumery had been founded in 1872 and was granted the use of the royal crown by Queen Victoria, but had come upon hard times, with declining profits and a fall in the quality of its products.

The first release by the newly purchased company was the Original Collection, which featured the fragrance pairs 1872, X, and No.1. The new millennium brought a re-launch for this collection, along with the release of a new family of perfumes. This was the Private Collection, which consisted of the introduction of C (2010), V (2012), and L (2014). The release of V coincided with Christian being awarded an OBE by Queen Elizabeth II in the 2012 New Year Honours List. Later that year, a special bottle was presented to the Queen for her Diamond Jubilee.

Clive Christian Perfume employs several hundred people and as of 2017, features more than 10 different perfumes on its site, including the newly launched Noble VIII pair.

== Acquisition ==
In 2015, a majority stake in the company was bought for an undisclosed sum by a consortium that included the founders of Stagecoach and venture capitalist Jon Moulton: founder and manager of Better Capital. Christian retained a stake in the company and also became creative director, with former Molton Brown executive Amy Nelson-Bennett appointed chief executive. In July 2019, the Clive Christian business and brand was acquired by Nichebox, a perfume holding company.
