= Clutha (dance) =

Scottish country dance

Clutha is a Scottish country dance, in which the eight dancers are arranged in a square set as for the Eightsome Reel. It is a 48 bar reel. An Clutha (more often spelt An Cluadha) is the Gaelic name for The Clyde. It is one of the modern Scottish country dances and was first published by the Royal Scottish Country Dance Society in 1983.

== See also ==
- List of Scottish country dances
