= Clutha ferry =

The Clutha ferry passenger harbour steamers provided a service running up and down the River Clyde in Glasgow, and were collectively known as Cluthas. They were introduced on 12 April 1884, with six boats. By 1899 twelve boats ran a service between Victoria Bridge and Whiteinch Ferry, taking about 45 minutes on the 3 miles (4.8 km) route which included 11 landing stages alternating on both sides of the river, and charging one penny fare for the full distance. This service was in addition to the cross ferries running from side to side of the river, which had introduced steam ferries in 1865.

The passengers using the Cluthas included workers commuting every day to the docks and industries along the river which included shipyards and engineering workshops. Competing services were introduced by the Glasgow subway which opened in 1896, and the tram system from 1901. The Cluthas were withdrawn in 1903.
