= Hugh S. Roberton (composer) =

Scottish composer and choirmaster (1875–1952)

- Born: 23 February 1874; Glasgow, Scotland
- Died: 7 October 1952 (aged 78); Glasgow, Scotland
- Occupations: Composer, choir conductor
- Spouse(s): Joan McGillivray (d. 1907); Helen Birkmyre (d. 1965)
- Children: 7 sons, 2 daughters, including Australian politician Hugh Roberton (1900–1987)

Sir Hugh Stevenson Roberton (23 February 1874 – 7 October 1952) was a Scottish composer and, as founder of the Glasgow Orpheus Choir, one of Britain's leading choral-masters in the first half of the 20th century.

Whilst he shared in later years a white goatee like fellow composer Thomas Beecham, he was known for his quiet Scottish humour.

== Life ==
Roberton was born in Glasgow, left school at the age of 14 and entered the family business – a funeral directors – which by the age of 21 he was managing. He worked there into the 1930s, devoting most of his spare time to music making. He was also involved in the artistic side of the Labour movement, a Fabian socialist, life-long pacifist and a friend of Ramsay MacDonald.

Roberton inherited his love of folk song from his mother, an untrained singer, and was largely self-taught in music, learning by singing in choirs and later directing them. As well as music, Roberton was an author and playwright. He wrote two plays, Kirsteen and Christ in the Kirkyaird (published together in 1922), some humorous essays under the title Curdies (1931), and a handbook, Choir Singing (1925).

== Orpheus Choir ==
In 1906 he founded the Glasgow Orpheus Choir. For five years before that it was the Toynbee Musical Association, which he started when aged only 26. A perfectionist, he expected the highest standards of performance from its members. Its voice was a choir voice, its individual voices not tolerated. Roberton set new standards in choral technique and interpretation. For almost fifty years, until it disbanded in 1951 on the retirement of its founder on grounds of ill-health, the Glasgow Orpheus Choir had no equal in Britain and toured widely enjoying world acclaim. Their repertoire included many Scottish folk songs arranged for choral performance, and Paraphrases, as well as Italian madrigals, English motets (including early performances of Elgar's partsongs) and the music of the Russian Orthodox Church. The choir also performed the works of Johann Sebastian Bach, George Frideric Handel, Felix Mendelssohn, Peter Cornelius, Johannes Brahms and others.

The autobiographical Orpheus with his Lute: a Glasgow Orpheus Choir Anthology, was published posthumously in 1963, with contributions by Roberton and other material edited by his son Kenneth.

== Composer and arranger ==
Roberton published over 300 of his own compositions and arrangements. The concert edition of Scottish Songs was first published in 1929. Songs of the Isles (1937) collects a further 20 songs based on highland airs, including Westering Home, and Mairi's Wedding. (The original Gaelic lyric and tune of Mairi's Wedding was by John Bannerman, 1865–1938). Roberton wrote alternative lyrics for Dashing White Sergeant, also included in the volume. His best known original composition is the partsong All in the April evening (words by Katharine Tynan).

== Personal life ==
Roberton was knighted in the 1931 New Year Honours, for services rendered to British music. Because of his pacifism and membership of the Peace Pledge Union both he and the Glasgow Orpheus Choir were banned by the BBC from broadcasting during the Second World War.

His married his first wife Joan McGillivray in 1895. She died in 1907.

His second wife, previously his housekeeper, was Lady Helen (Birkmyre) Roberton. She died in Cathcart, Glasgow in 1965, aged 83 years. Living on Briar Road, Glasgow, Roberton had died on 7 October 1952.

There were seven sons and two daughters, including the Australian politician and diplomat Hugh Roberton (1900–1987) and Kenneth Roberton, music publisher.

== Sources ==
- Dictionary of National Biography
- University of Glasgow
- Hugh S. Roberton and Kenneth Roberton. Orpheus with his Lute – A Glasgow Orpheus Choir Anthology (1963)
- National Portrait Gallery
