= Clive Christian No. 1 =

Perfume

No. 1

Fragrance by Clive Christian
- Released: 2001
- Label: Crown Perfumery
- Tagline: The World Most Expensive Perfume

Clive Christian No. 1 is an English fragrance that was introduced in 2001 by designer Clive Christian. It was marketed by parent company Crown Perfumery, established in 1872. Clive Christian No. 1 was the most expensive perfume in the world as of 2006, costing $2,150 an ounce.
