= Reel of the 51st Highlanders =

One of the most popular Scottish country dances of all time, the Reel of the 51st Highland Division is a modern Scottish country dance written by Lieutenant J.E.M. ‘Jim’ Atkinson of the 7th Battalion The Argyll and Sutherland Highlanders while in a POW camp during the Second World War. Captured together with the vast majority of the British 51st (Highland) Division. in 1940, Atkinson spent the rest of the war as a POW in Germany. The 51st had been separated from the British Expeditionary Force, and put under the control of the French command. Given an overlong length of line to defend, they were overwhelmed and had to retreat to the French port of St Valery. Unfortunately Rommel in the Tank Corps got there first and prevented any embarkation.

Atkinson's idea of a reel with a Saint Andrew's Cross in its key formation was intended to symbolise Scotland and the Highland Division, in adversity. His letter home with instructions for the dance was intercepted by the German security service, the Abwehr, who spent the rest of the war trying to break the code. However, another version of the dance reached Scotland where it was published while Atkinson was still a POW and became instantly popular.

Also known as the Laufen Reel after Laufen Castle, Oflag VII-C near Salzburg, the 51st Country Dance, the Reel of the 51st Highland Division, and St Valery's Reel, it is often danced in a set composed entirely of men.

== See also ==
- List of Scottish country dances
