= Dashing White Sergeant =

Scottish country dance

The Dashing White Sergeant is a Scottish country dance, performed to a similarly titled piece of music. The dance is in 4/4 time, thus it is in the form of a reel. The dance is performed by groups of six dancers and is progressive.

== History ==
The title comes from the original lyrics, traditionally attributed to the 18th century General, John Burgoyne. It was set to music by the English composer, Sir Henry Rowley Bishop in 1826. The song was to be part of one of Bishop's operas, but there is no evidence it was ever incorporated into one. It was adapted into a military march and was the regimental march of the Royal Berkshire Regiment. It quickly became very popular in the United States both as a song and a dance tune, and was added to the repertoire of the West Point Military Academy, where it is still played today at certain events. It has been suggested that it was the inspiration for "I Wish I Was in Dixie", as the opening bars bear a resemblance. The dance steps come from the tradition of Swedish circle dancing, that was popular in Victorian Britain. The better known lyrics shown below, were written by the Scottish composer, Sir Hugh S. Roberton for the Glasgow Orpheus Choir.

The earlier version by Bishop and the later arrangement by Sir Hugh Roberton bear no relationship to one another.

== Steps ==
The six dancers form a circle, traditionally of three men and three women standing alternately, which will break apart into two sets of three dancers. All six join hands and the circle turns anti-clockwise for eight counts, then clockwise for eight counts. The circle then separates into the two sets of three. The dancer in the middle (leader) of the three turns to the partner on the right, sets to (dances with) them for four counts and turns them for four counts, then repeats this with the partner on the left. The leader then turns the partner on the right again, followed by the partner on the left, the partner on the right, the partner on the left. He then joins hands with both partners so the three form a straight line facing the other set of three. Both sets walk towards each other for two steps, and stamp their feet three times (over the course of two counts, therefore including one off-beat), then retreat for two steps and clap their hands similarly to the stamping. They then walk towards each other again (again holding hands), and one set raises its arms to form archways under which the other dancers pass to meet the next set of three coming from another circle, with whom the dance is repeated.

== Lyrics ==
=== General Burgoyne's lyrics ===
If I had a beau for a soldier who'd go,
Do you think I'd say no? No, no, not I!
For a soldier who'd go, Do you think I'd say no?
No, no, no, no, no, no, not I!
When his red coat I saw,
Not a sigh would it draw,
But I'd give him eclat for his bravery!
If an army of Amazons ere came in play,
As a dashing white sergeant I’d march away.

Chorus:
A dashing white sergeant I’d march away, march away, march away, march away.
March away, march away, march away, march away, march away, march away.

=== Sir Hugh Roberton's lyrics ===
Now the fiddler's ready, let us all begin
So step it out and step it in
To the merry music of the violin
We'll dance the hours away.

(Repeat first 4 lines, then):
Katie and Peggy and Patsy and Paul,
Callum and Peter and Flora and Moll,
Dance, dance, dance, dance, dance away the hours together!
Dance till dawn be in the sky,
What care you and what care I?
Hearts a-beating, spirits high,
We're gonna dance, dance, dance!

== See also ==
- List of Scottish country dances
