= Duke of Perth (reel) =

Scottish country dance

The Duke of Perth, also known as Broun's Reel, is a traditional Scottish reel, played in G major. Although called a reel, the tune meets the criteria for a rant. However, it is usually played at a considerably slower tempo as a Scottish measure, or country dance, in 2/4 time. The dance performed to the tune is also called Duke of Perth and was very popular around Angus, east Fife and Perthshire, to the extent that it was a feature at various hunt balls in the region.

== See also ==
- List of Scottish country dances
