= The Promise of the Day =

Studio album by The Corries
- Released: 1965
- Genre: Scottish folk
- Producer: W Gordon Smith

The Corries chronology
The Corrie Folk Trio and Paddie Bell (1964)	The Promise of the Day (1965)	Those Wild Corries (1966)

The Promise of the Day is a music album by the band The Corrie Folk Trio and Paddie Bell. The album was produced in 1965 for the Scottish label Waverley Records. It was issued by the American label Elektra Records in 1966.

== Overview ==
The title of the album is a line from "The Uist Tramping Song". It was their first album in stereo and "The Uist Tramping Song" gives the three male voices very distinct stereo separation. On this album there are two sea shanties, and only one Jacobite song. For the first time Roy Williamson is given a lead vocal (Verdant Braes O' Screen) but his voice is weak compared to later albums. In the liner lines by W Gordon Smith he is cast in the role of an absent-minded scholar. Paddie Bell sings "Fear A Bhata", with the chorus in Gaelic. Their singing of "Killiecrankie" was recorded on film and broadcast on "The White Heather Club" at about the time that this album was recorded.

== Track listing ==
1. My Love She's But A Lassie Yet
2. Shoals O' Herrin' (Ewan MacColl)
3. The Trooper and the Maid [Child Ballad 299]
4. Whistling Gypsy [Child Ballad 200]
5. Queen Mary (vocal by Paddie Bell)
6. The Leaving of Liverpool
7. Uist Tramping Song (Bannerman / Robertson)
8. Johnnie Lad
9. Roddy McCorly
10. Verdant Braes O' Screen
11. Around Cape Horn
12. Fear A Bhata (vocal by Paddie Bell)
13. Killiecrankie
14. Jock Hawk's Adventures In Glasgow

== Personnel ==
- Roy Williamson – vocals, guitar, bandurria, concertina
- Ronnie Browne – vocals
- Bill Smith – vocals, guitar, whistle
- Paddie Bell – vocals, banjo
- Archie Fisher – banjo (on "Roddy McCorly" and "Johnnie Lad")
- Robin Brock – acoustic bass

Acoustic guitars, mandolin, bandura and penny whistle are heard but no credits are given.
