= John Strachan (singer) =

Scottish farmer & singer (1875–1958)

John Strachan (1875–1958) was a Scottish farmer and Traditional singer of Bothy Ballads including several old and influential versions of the famous Child Ballads. He had a huge repertoire of traditional songs, and was recorded by the likes of James Madison Carpenter, Alan Lomax and Hamish Henderson.

== Background ==
John Strachan was born on a farm, Crichie, near St. Katherines in Aberdeenshire. His father had made his fortune by trading in horses, and had rented the farm. From 1886 John attended Robert Gordon's College as a boarder in Aberdeen. In 1888 he moved with his father to Craigies in Tarves. In 1895 he moved back to Crichie, which became his own farm in 1897. It was still rented, but he bought it in 1918. By 1939 he was successful enough to own five farms. He became president of the Turriff Agricultural Association. He died in Crichie.

== Tradition Bearer ==
John Strachan was a "tradition bearer". He was part of the last generation to sing traditional songs in bothies, along with Davie Stewart, Jimmy MacBeath and Willie Scott, though he never met them, as far as we know. A dancing master visited the farms. The farm labourers would learn to dance the highland fling and sword dances, at that time performed in hard shoes. John was dismissive of the modern fashion to perform Highland dancing in soft shoes, or "Patent slippers" as he called them. He learned songs from his mother and from the servants on his father's farm. His social status was higher than almost all other recorded singers of ballads. He was refused entry to a fraternity called "The Horseman's Word", intended for farmservants who looked after horses. They claimed to be able to control horses through whispering special words in a horse's ear.

In 1930 the American collector James Madison Carpenter came from Harvard with a wax cylinder recorder. He reached Crichie about midnight. Strachan sang "Dark and Shallow Water" for Carpenter. Strachan had learned the song from Jimmy Smith. Later they both travelled over 50 miles to find him, only to discover that he had forgotten the song. Carpenter was sufficiently impressed by Strachan to invite him to return to the States with him, but he refused. In 1935 a radio program "The Farm Year" was broadcast live from Crichie. Using songs, stories and authentic sound effects such as bagpipes and revving cars, they dramatised farm work. John Strachan and another singer, Willie Kemp, took part. John Mearns sang "The Bonnie Lass o' Fyvie" on the broadcast.

Fyvie is about 3 miles from Crichie. On 16 July 1951, John Strachan sang the song for Alan Lomax who recorded it using a portable tape recorder. It is the earliest known recording of the song. Some of the recordings made that year were issued commercially on "Folk Songs of Britain" in 1960, but the fullest version was in 2002 on the album Songs from Aberdeenshire. They are fine examples of Doric dialect (Scotland).

== Repertoire and legacy ==
Strachan had an impressive repertoire of songs that had been passed down by word of mouth, probably in this same locality, for over 200 years. These included many of the famous Child Ballads, such as Binnorie, Clyde's Water, Robin Hood and Little John, Johnnie O Braidislie, The Beggar Man, Glenlogie, The Laird O Drum, Lang Johnnie More, The Farmer's Son, Keech in Creel, Bonnie Baby Livingston, Fair Rosie Ann, Four Marys The Bonnie Hoose O Airlie, and The Knight and the Shepherd's Daughter.

Steeleye Span covered his version of The Knight and the Shepherd's Daughter as "The Royal Forester" on their 1972 album Below the Salt.

Bob Dylan covered Strachan's version of "Peggy O" as "Pretty Peggy-O" on his first album in 1962. Simon and Garfunkel recorded it in 1964 on the album Wednesday Morning 3AM. The Corries recorded it in 1965. On the album, Strachan sings "Lang Johnnie More", 43 verses long, lasting almost 13 minutes, to the tune of "Caul Kail in Aberdeen". Just afterwards, he said "Noo it's too long that". Strachan must have known many bawdy songs but seemed reluctant to sing them. He gave us a fragment of "The Ball of Kirriemuir", also known as "Four and Twenty Virgins Went up to Inverness". At the end he says "It's a terrible een".

== Footnotes ==
- This article derives from the liner notes to "Songs From Aberdeenshire", but the text has been changed considerably.
