= Live from Scotland Volume 1 =

1974 live album by The Corries

Live album by The Corries
- Released: 1974
- Venue: Glasgow City Halls

The Corries chronology
A Little of What You Fancy (1973)	Live from Scotland Volume 1 (1974)	Live from Scotland Volume 2 (1975)

Live from Scotland Volume 1 is a 1974 album by The Corries recorded at the Glasgow City Halls.

== Line-Up ==
- Roy Williamson
- Ronnie Browne

== Tracks ==
Side One:

- 1. Fallaldy, R.G. Browne/trad. Arranged The Corries. Pub. The Corries (music) Ltd. R. Williamson Flute, R. Browne Guitar.
- 2. Mingulay Boat Song, Words Sir Hugh S. Roberton. Arranged The Corries. Pub. Roberton. R. Williamson Mandoline, R. Browne Mandoline.
- 3. Lads Among The Heather, Trad. From the Singing of Jock Anderson. Arranged The Corries. Pub. The Corries (music) Ltd. R. Williamson Mandoline, R. Browne Mandoline.
- 4. A Scottish Holiday, Parody of words by J.W. Hill. Pub. The Corries (music) ltd. Music: Road to the Isles by kind permission of M. Kennedy Fraser Est. Pub. Boosey & Hawkes Ltd. R. Williamson Guitar, R. Browne Guitar.
- 5. Hugh The Graeme, Trad. Arranged The Corries. Pub. The Corries (music) Ltd. R. Williamson Guitar, R. Browne Guitar.
- 6. Maggie Lauder, Trad. Arranged The Corries. Pub. The Corries (music) Ltd. R. Williamson Banduria, R. Browne Guitar.

Side Two:

- 1. The Roses of Prince Charlie, R.G. Browne. Arranged The Corries. Pub. The Corries (music) Ltd. R. Williamson Guitar, R. Browne Guitar.
- 2. Dark Lochnagar, Lord Byron. Arranged The Corries. Pub. The Corries (music) Ltd. R. Williamson Guitar, R. Browne Guitar.
- 3. Loch Tay Boat Song, Words: McLeod and Boulton. Arranged The Corries. Pub. J.B. Cramer. R. Williamson Combolin R. Browne Combolin.
- 4. The M.hm Song, Trad. From the Singing of Jock Anderson. Arranged The Corries. Pub. The Corries (music) Ltd. R. Williamson Mandoline, R. Browne Mandoline.
- 5. Flower of Scotland, R.M.B. Williamson. Arranged The Corries. Pub. The Corries (music) Ltd. R. Williamson Guitar, R. Browne Guitar.
