= Rose the Red and White Lily =

Traditional song

"Rose the Red and White Lily" is Child ballad number 103. (Roud 3335)

== Synopsis ==
Rose the Red and White Lily had lost their mother, and their father had remarried an evil stepmother. They had two stepbrothers who fell in love with them, and their stepmother sent them away. When they asked her to treat their loves as well as she treated them, she vowed they would never see them again.

They ran away and dressed as men. Rose the Red went to court to find Bold Arthur. White Lily went to the greenwood in search of her love Brown Robin—or in some variants Robin Hood -- she found him, and became pregnant. When she went into labor, she asked him to blow the horn to summon her brother. Jealous, he refuses. She blows it, Rose the Red comes, and Brown Robin fights her until she is wounded and admits to being a woman.

The news that one of Brown Robin's men has given birth spread to the court, and the king and Bold Arthur, Rose the Red's love, came to see. They found White Lily, Rose the Red, and Brown Robin. The king insisted on a double wedding, and Rose the Red commented on what their stepmother's reaction would have been, if only she could see.

== Commentary ==
The birth in the wood is a common ballad motif, being found in Willie and Earl Richard's Daughter, Willie o Douglas Dale, and Leesome Brand.

In one variant, this ballad introduces Robin Hood; the sisters both go to the wood and end up marrying Robin Hood and Little John. This is not part of the Robin Hood cycle and appears to stem from the hero's name being Brown Robin, suggesting a connection.
