= Live from Scotland Volume 2 =

1975 album by The Corries

Live album by The Corries
- Released: 1975
- Venue: Glasgow City Halls; Motherwell Town Hall; Dunfermline Carnegie Hall; Edinburgh Usher Hall

The Corries chronology
Live from Scotland Volume 1 (1974)	Live from Scotland Volume 2 (1975)	Live from Scotland Volume 3 (1975)

Live from Scotland Volume 2 was a 1975 album by The Corries recorded at the Glasgow City Halls, Motherwell Town Hall, Dunfermline Carnegie Hall and Edinburgh Usher Hall, in 1974 and 1975.

== Line-Up ==
- Roy Williamson
- Ronnie Browne

== Tracks ==
The tracks were: Side One:

- 1. Lock The Door Lariston, Trad. Arr/Adpd. The Corries. Pub. Corries (music) Ltd. R. Williamson Guitar, R. Browne Guitar.
- 2. Sunday Driver, Words by J.W. Hill. Arr. The Corries. Pub. Corries (music) Ltd. R. Williamson Guitar, R. Browne Guitar.
- 3. Come O'er The Stream Charlie, Trad. Arr. The Corries. Pub. Corries (music) Ltd. R. Williamson Borahn, R. Browne Borahn.
- 4. King Fareweel, Trad. From Isabel Sutherland. Arr/Adpd. The Corries. Pub. Corries (music) Ltd. R. Williamson Northhumbrian Pipes, R. Browne Harmonica.
- 5. Yur Losin' Them, Tune Trad. Words Anon. Arr. The Corries. Pub. Corries (music) Ltd. R. Williamson Borahn, R. Browne Borahn.
- 6. Ettrick Lady, Tune Harmony Music Ltd. Words Trad. Arr/Adpd. The Corries. Pub. Corries (music) Ltd. R. Williamson Mandolin, R. Browne Mandolin.
- 7. Nancy Whisky, Trad. From Willie Scott. Arr/Adpd. The Corries. Pub. Corries (music) Ltd. R. Williamson Mandolin, R. Browne Mandolin.

Side Two:

- 1. Sae Will We Yet, Trad. From Rob Anderson. Arr/Adpd. The Corries. Pub. Corries (music) Ltd. R. Williamson Guitar, R. Browne Guitar.
- 2. Lord Yester, Words G. Weir. Tune R.M.B. Williamson. Arr. The Corries. Pub. Corries (music) Ltd. R. Williamson Guitar, R. Browne Guitar.
- 3. Reivers Galley, R.M.B. Williamson. Arr. The Corries. Pub. Corries (music) Ltd. R. Williamson Guitar, R. Browne Guitar.
- 4. La-Di-Dum, Rikki Fulton. Pub. Rikki Fulton. R. Williamson Guitar, R. Browne Guitar.
- 5. Johnny Ra, Trad. From Willie Scott. Arr/Adpd. The Corries. Pub. Corries (music) Ltd. R. Williamson Mandolin, R. Browne Mandolin.
- 6. MacPherson's Rant, Trad. Arr/Adpd. The Corries. Pub. Corries (music) Ltd. R. Williamson Guitar, R. Browne Guitar.

== Sleeve notes ==
This is the Corries second volume in their two volume series "live from Scotland", recorded on tour 1974/75 at Glasgow City Hall, Motherwell Town Hall, Dunfermline Carnegie Hall and Edinburgh Usher Hall.

In these two recordings, we have tried to capture the sense of occasion that a Corrie concert has become. A mammoth task from a recording viewpoint, as the tempo of the concerts, and of course the running order of the material, changes from night to night according to the mood of the boys, the accuracy of their memory, their feelings, the rapport of the crowd, the strength of the coffee at half time, I'm convinced the weather situation. These and many other excuses have been put to me by the boys for making my life a misery. To try and plot the moment to change tapes, to convince them that they won't be heard 30 feet away from the microphone, to tell them that hefty foot tapping will inevitably come over on the track, is a waste of breath and a source of endless amusement to Ronnie and Roy.

Suffice to say that recording them on tour has made me lighter by nearly a stone and for that reason and of course for the laughter, the stirring moments, the sad songs, the sense of having tried and I hope achieved recording the Corries live, it has all been worthwhile.

Good listening. Alan Spence, Recording Supervisor.
