= Lock the Door, Lariston =

Scottish ballad

Lock the Door, Lariston is a border ballad by the Scottish poet James Hogg, the "Ettrick Shepherd", first published in 1811. It describes a sixteenth-century armed raid by English border reivers across the Anglo-Scottish border, met and defeated by Scottish borderers led by Jock Elliott of Lariston. Written in a traditional form, it was set to music by the 1850s, and is now a commonly performed Scottish folk song.

== Content ==
The ballad begins with a call to "Lariston, Lion of Liddesdale" to respond to a heavily armed English raid. ("Lock the door, Lariston, Lowther comes on / The Armstrongs are flying, the widows are crying..."). The second verse is a roll-call of English names, singling out Bewcastle and Ridley, and warning that they are "relentless, determined, and nigh". The third presents Elliot's response, a heroic greeting to his opponents as "brave foemen / ... no men / more gallant to meet in the foray or chase", followed by a listing of Scots names, continued in the fourth verse ("Mangerton, Gornberry, Raeburn, and Netherby...") and a challenge to fight "at the Breaken Tower" in Liddesdale. The fifth verse describes a hard-fought battle, with the English defeated ("See how they wane, the proud files of the Windermere") and the Scots jubilant in victory ("Hear the wide welkin rend / While the Scots shouts ascend / Elliot of Lariston, Elliot for aye!").

== Commentary ==
The ballad is written in the style of a traditional border riding ballad, and demonstrated Hogg's ability to work convincingly in a distinctive and traditionally Borders style.

The long lists of names are the most distinctive feature of the ballad; Hogg later described it as "having no merit whatsoever, excepting a jingle of names" - though adding "I defy the British nation / to match me at alliteration". It was one of his early compositions, written in 1797 and first published in The Spy, March 1811. Early reprints of it in the London papers and elsewhere attributed it to his friend (and later brother-in-law) James Gray, but Hogg firmly claimed his authorship in the introduction he wrote to it in Songs, by the Ettrick shepherd (1831).

Michael Brander identified the ballad as describing the mid-sixteenth century, around or shortly after the period of the Rough Wooing, although it does not appear to describe a specific event. While Hogg did not explicitly identify the men named in the ballad, the "Jock Elliot" mentioned is identified by the Scottish Dictionary of Phrase and Fable as a famous reiver active in the 1560s, the subject of the famous ballad Little Jock Elliot. "Old Sim of Whitram" has the same name as a prominent Liddesdale leader recorded by Robert Carey in 1598, though this was a generation later than Jock Elliot.

The location can be more precisely identified; Castletown was a village in Liddesdale, southern Roxburghshire, located a few miles inside Scotland along the Liddel Water. The "Breaken Tower", where the climactic battle was set, was a peel tower at Lariston, slightly further to the north-east along the Lariston Burn. It was demolished in 1792 for building materials, and would presumably have been familiar to Hogg as a young man.

As a song, the ballad is a popular piece of Scottish folk music, and is listed in the Roud Folk Song Index as #21732. Following John Clarke Whitfield's publication of Twelve Vocal Pieces in 1816, Hogg offered him a number of pieces including the (then uncollected) Lariston for adaptation in a second volume, though it does not appear to have been one of the works selected. It is not clear when the first melody for the work was published, though at least one was extant by the 1850s.

The most common modern recording is by The Corries, who released a version with Paddie Bell on The Corrie Folk Trio and Paddie Bell (1964), and another on Live from Scotland Volume 2 (1975).
