= The Corrie Folk Trio and Paddie Bell =

Studio album by The Corries
- Released: 1964
- Genre: Scottish folk
- Producer: W Gordon Smith

The Corries chronology
The Corrie Folk Trio and Paddie Bell (1964)	The Promise of the Day (1965)

The Corrie Folk Trio and Paddie Bell is the eponymous 1964 album by The Corrie Folk Trio and Paddie Bell.

== Musical style ==
The most vigorous song on this album is "Greenland Fisheries" with Ronnie Browne shouting "There She Blows" at the start of the song, at the top of his voice. "Jock O' Braidislee" is sung unaccompanied by Ronnie Browne. Paddie Bell sings "Lord Gregory" with only her banjo for accompaniment. The album begins with four songs associated with the game of two balls and a wall.

== Track listing ==
1. The Singing Games. (a) The Windy City (I'll Tell Me Ma) (b) Call on the one you love (c) 1 2 3 O'Leary (d) I'm No Goin' Tae Barry's Trip
2. Lock The Door, Lariston
3. Jock o' Braidislee (solo by Ronnie Browne)
4. Doodle Let Me Go (Yellow Girls) (vocal by Paddie Bell)
5. The Lass O' Fyvie
6. The Itinerant Cobbler
7. Lord Gregory (vocal by Paddie Bell) [Child Ballad 76]
8. McPherson's Farewell
9. Coorie Doon (vocal by Paddie Bell)(written by Matt McGinn)
10. Greenland Fisheries

Note: The 2002 CD re-release included their entire second album The Promise of the Day as tracks 11–24.

== Personnel ==
- Roy Williamson – vocals, concertina
- Ronnie Browne – vocals
- Bill Smith – vocals, guitar
- Paddie Bell – vocals, banjo
- Robin Brock – acoustic bass (track 8)

Note: Acoustic guitars, mandolin, and bandurría are also heard but no credits are given.
