= Johnie Cock =

Traditional song

Johnie Cock (also Johnny O'Breadisley or Jock o' Braidislee) is a traditional Scottish folk ballad, listed as the 114th Child Ballad and number 69 in the Roud Folk Song Index.

== Synopsis ==
Johnie Cock is warned by his mother that he is in danger but nevertheless goes poaching and kills a deer. He feeds his dogs and sleeps in the woods. A man (sometimes a palmer, a medieval European pilgrim to the Holy Land) betrays him to foresters, who attack him while he sleeps. Johnie wakes. Either he or his nephew rebukes them for the attack, in most variants saying that even a wolf would not have attacked him like that. In most variants, he fights and kills all of his assailants but one, whom he wounds.

In several versions, he dies of his wounds while still in the wood. In one variant, he is laid low, and the king sends him a pardon.

== Recordings ==
Many recordings made by in the 1930s by James Madison Carpenter of traditional Aberdeenshire singers can be heard on the Vaughan Williams Memorial Library website, including versions by Bell Duncan of Ythan Wells and John Strachan of Fyvie (who was later recorded singing the song by Alan Lomax). Duncan Williamson also sang a traditional version, as did Gordeanna McCulloch. The Corries also recorded and performed the song a number of times, using the title "Jock O’ Braidislee".
