= Highland Cathedral =

Song
- Released: 1982
- Composers: Ulrich Roever and Michael Korb

"Highland Cathedral" (Scottish Gaelic: Cathair-eaglais na Gàidhealtachd) is a popular melody for the great Highland bagpipe.

It was composed by the German musicians Ulrich Roever and Michael Korb in 1982. The story that it was written for a Highland games held in Germany has been refuted on Michael Korb's website. It has been proposed as the Scottish national anthem to replace the unofficial anthems "Scotland the Brave" and "Flower of Scotland". It has subsequently undergone various orchestrations and had lyrics added in English and in Scottish Gaelic.

The tune was the Royal Hong Kong Police anthem under British rule, which ended in 1997. It was played at a ceremonial lowering of the governor's flag at Chris Patten's official residence, Government House in Central, on the last day of British rule. "Highland Cathedral" is Patten's favourite pipe tune, as he said on a BBC Asia Today programme.

The tune has been performed by the Royal Scots Dragoon Guards, and featured in the album Spirit of the Glen, which won a Classic Brit Award in 2009. The song has been performed at numerous Scottish cultural events, including Scotland's Rugby Union games. It is also a popular wedding song.

It was played on 4 May 2019 at the state funeral of Jean, Grand Duke of Luxembourg at the Notre-Dame Cathedral, Luxembourg by the Band of the Irish Guards and the Luxembourg Military Band.

== Lyrics ==
Lyrics were written by Ben Kelly in 1990 and registered with PRS and MCPS.
