= Peat Fire Flame =

Studio album by The Corries
- Released: 1977
- Genre: Folk
- Length: 38:13
- Label: Dara

The Corries chronology
Live from Scotland Volume 4 (1977)	Peat Fire Flame (1977)	Spotlight On The Corries (1977)

Professional ratings
Review scores
Source	Rating
Allmusic	3/5 stars

Peat Fire Flame is an album recorded in 1977 by The Corries, a Scottish folk group. The combolin (an instrument devised by Roy Williamson) is heard to advantage on "Come By the Hills". Williamson and Ronnie Browne are heard on the vocals. There is multi-tracking to include both men on guitars, Northumbrian pipes, harmonicas, whistles, flutes, concertina, mandolins, boranns (i.e. bodhráns), fiddle and combolins. The last four tracks are designed to be heard as one continuous track. Running time: 38 minutes 13 seconds.

== Track listing ==
1. "Leezie Lindsay" (Ronnie Browne/ Roy Williamson)
2. "Braw Braw Lads" (Trad)
3. "Peat Fire Flame" (Trad)
4. "Mormond Braes" (Trad)
5. "Come By The Hills" (Trad)
6. "The White Cockade" (Trad)
7. "The Barge of Gorrie Crovan" (Trad)
8. "Turn Ye Tae Me" (Trad)
9. "Eriskay Love Lilt" (Trad)
10. "The Wee Cooper O' Fife" (Trad)
11. "Lord Gregory" (Trad)
12. "The Poachers" (Trad)
