= Roses of Prince Charlie =

Scottish folk song

"Roses of Prince Charlie" is a modern Scottish folk song composed by Ronnie Browne of The Corries. It was written circa 1973 and first appeared in their album released in 1974, Live From Scotland Volume 1. The title of the song refers to the symbol of Charles Edward Stuart, which was a white rose. The words represent Jacobitism and modern Scottish Nationalism.

In the first verse, Browne mentions two battles between Scotland and England as well as the Jacobite uprising of 1745–6; Bannockburn, Flodden, and Culloden. The second verse mentions Scottish mass emigration and the industry of Scottish immigrants ("carved out the New World with sweat, blood, and hand"). The 'New World' refers to countries such as America and Canada, where the Scottish population emigrated to in the 1800s (or were shipped to penal colonies there in earlier periods). The third verse of the song references Scottish industrialisation of the 20th century and seems to mentions the hopes for a devolved or independent Scotland (Black Gold and fisheries etc.). This is plausible, as Browne often mentioned Scottish independence in his songs.

Roses o' Prince Charlie's timing is 2/4, although when played to crowds it was played faster due to the audience clapping to a faster timing than it was played in a studio. It was meant for two guitars, with both players singing the chorus and one singing each verse (as it was commonly sung by The Corries, which Browne was notably a part of). The song appeared on Live From Scotland Volume 1, The Lads among heather (Volume 1 and 2), and The Corries 21st anniversary concert. After Roy Williamson's death, Ronnie Browne sang this song in his solo album released in 1996, Battle Songs and Ballads.

== Lyrics ==
(Chorus)

Come now, gather round, here where the flowers grow,

White is the blossom as the snow on the ben.

Hear now freedom's call, we'll make a solemn vow

Now by the roses o' Prince Charlie.

(Verse 1)

Fight again at Bannockburn, your battle axe to wield,

Fight with your grandsires at Flodden's bloody field.

Fight at Culloden, the bonnie prince to shield,

Fight by the roses o' Prince Charlie.

(Chorus)

(Verse 2)

Spirits o' the banished in far and distant lands,

Carved out the new world with sweat, blood and hand.

Return now in glory and on the silver sand,

Fight by the roses o' Prince Charlie.

(Chorus)

(Verse 3)

Tak your strength fae the green fields that blanket peat and coal,

Ships fae the Clyde have a nation in their hold.

The water o' life some men need tae make them bold.

Black gold and fishes fae the sea, man!

(Chorus)
