= The Lass of Roch Royal =

Traditional song

"The Lass of Roch Royal" (Roud 49, Child 76) is an English-language folk song, existing in several variants.

== Synopsis ==
A woman comes to Gregory's castle, pleading to be let in; she is either pregnant or with a newborn son. His mother turns her away; sometimes she tells her that he went to sea, and she goes to follow him and dies in shipwreck. Gregory wakes and says he dreamed of her. He chases her, finds her body, and dies.

== Variants ==
Alternate titles of "The Lass of Roch Royal" include "Lord Gregory", "Fair Anny", "Oh Open the Door Lord Gregory", "The Lass of Loch Royal" "The Lass of Aughrim", and "Mirk Mirk".

"The New-Slain Knight" has, in some variants, verses identical to those of some variants of "The Lass of Roch Royal", where the woman laments her baby's lack of a father.

Also Child ballad number 216 ("The Mother's Malison") is almost identical to "The Lass of Roch Royal" only in a reversed manner, telling the story of a young man looking for his beloved.

== Literary influences ==
The Northamptonshire poet John Clare wrote a poem "The Maid of Ocram, or, Lord Gregory" presumably based on an Irish version of the ballad. Clare was influenced by Gypsy travellers and may have heard folk songs and ballads from them.

"The Lass of Aughrim", an Irish version of "The Lass of Roch Royal", figures prominently in the story "The Dead" by James Joyce, as well as being performed in John Huston's 1987 film adaptation. It is also sung by Susan Lynch and Ewan McGregor in the film Nora (2000) where they play Nora Barnacle and her husband Joyce respectively.

== Early printed versions ==
This ballad was printed as a broadside ballad under the title "The lass of Ocram". J Pitts of Seven Dials, London published it sometime between 1819 and 1844. It was also published by Catnach, also of London, and Collard of Bristol.

== Collected versions ==
The Roud Folk Song Index lists 12 versions collected from traditional singers from Scotland, 4 from Ireland, 1 from Canada and 82 from the US, with 30 from Virginia. However, many of these are based on the "Who's gonna shoe your pretty little foot, who's gonna glove your hand" motif. For example, the version listed for Charlie Poole, entitled "When I'm Far Away" from North Carolina goes as follows:

Who's gonna smoke the old clay pipe? x3
When I am far away

followed by:

Who's gonna be your little man?
Who's gonna glove your little hand?
Who's gonna shoe your little foot?
Who's gonna kiss your little lips?

Versions which omit the cruel mother have been collected in Indiana as "Who Will Shoe Your Pretty Little Foot" and from an unspecified location in USA as "The True Lover's Farewell!".

There are longer versions, notably Jean Ritchie's "Fair Annie of Lochroyan", which fairly accurately tells the story, ending with a quatrain:

Then he took out a little dart
That hung down by his side
And thrust it through and through his heart
And then fell down and died.

== Recordings ==
=== Field recordings ===
There are recordings of 7 versions on the Tobar an Dualchais/Kist of Riches website—three by Scottish traveller Charlotte Higgins, and one each by John McEvoy, a 13-year-old Isla St Clair, Stanley Robertson and Cathal O'Connell.

There is a version by Irish singer Elizabeth Cronin on the Cultural Equity website.

=== Recordings by revival singers and groups ===
- "Who's Going to Shoe Your Pretty Little Feet" on The Asch Recordings by Woody Guthrie (1944)
- "Fair Annie of Lochroyan" on British Traditional Ballads in the Southern Mountains, Volume 1; performed by Jean Ritchie (1960)
- "Kingsport Town" on The Bootleg Series Volumes 1–3 (Rare & Unreleased) 1961–1991 by Bob Dylan (adapted by) (recorded 1962, released 1991). The tune is that of "Who's Going to Shoe Your Pretty Little Feet" by Woody Guthrie. The words have only a slight, but a discernible, relation to that or any other version.
- "Lass of Loch Royal" on Who's Going to Shoe Your Pretty Little Foot? Who's Going to Glove Your Hand? by Peggy Seeger and Tom Paley with Claudia Paley (1964) (Topic 12T113)
- "Lord Gregory" on The Corrie Folk Trio and Paddie Bell by The Corries (1965)
- "Lord Gregory" on Fifth Album by Judy Collins (1965)
- "Anne of Lochroyan", on Isla St Clair Sings Traditional Scottish Songs by Isla St Clair (1972)
- "Lass of Loch Royal" on Silly Sisters by Silly Sisters (1976)
- "Lord Gregory" on Peat Fire Flame by The Corries (1977)
- "Lass of Lochroyan" on New Directions in the Old by Roy Bailey (1997)
- "Lord Gregory" on Restless Home by Orion (1998)
- "Lord Gregory" on The Dark Ages EP by Equation (2000)
- "Lord Gregory" on Crook of My Arm by Alasdair Roberts (2001)
- "Anne of Lochroyan" on Looking at the Stars by Vikki Clayton (2001)
- "Lord Gregory" on Bloody Men by Steeleye Span (2006)
- "The Lass of Aughrim" on Echos of Home The Solo Piano of Phil Coulter by Phil Coulter (2014)
- "The Lass of Aughrim" on Heard a Long Gone Song by Lisa O'Neill (2018)
- "Fair Annie of Lochroyan" on Silver Came by Burd Ellen (2019)
- "Lord Gregory" on The Outlander by Jim Moray and Josienne Clarke (2019)
- "Lord Gregory" on Nine Waves by Ye Vagabonds (2022)

== See also ==
- The Mother's Malison
