= Motherwell Town Hall =

Municipal building in Motherwell, Scotland

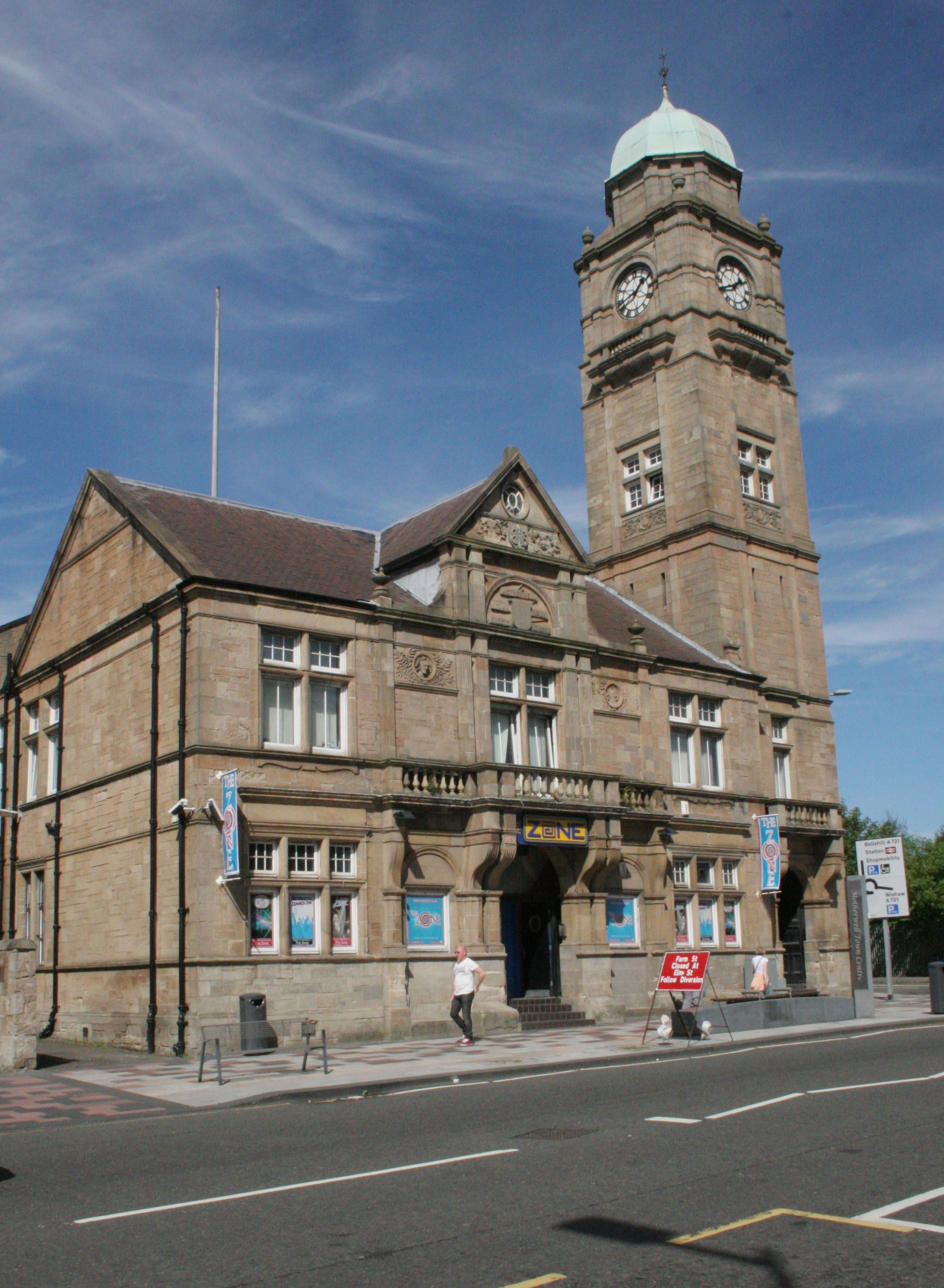
- Motherwell Town Hall

- Shown in North Lanarkshire
- 55.7904°N 3.9933°W
- Location: Motherwell

History
- Built: 1887

Site notes
- Architect: John Bennie Wilson
- Architectural style: Queen Anne style

Listed Building – Category C(S)
- Designated: 10 December 2001
- Reference no.: LB48305

Motherwell Town Hall is a municipal facility in Hamilton Road, Motherwell, North Lanarkshire, Scotland. The town hall, which was the headquarters of the Burgh of Motherwell and Wishaw Council, is a Category C listed building.

== History ==
In the mid to late 19th century, the Victoria Theatre in Watson Street performed the functions of town hall in Motherwell. After deciding that this arrangement was inadequate for their needs, civic leaders decided to recommend the procurement of a purpose-built town hall: after a local referendum was arranged in October 1885, rate-payers voted overwhelmingly in favour of the proposal. The site selected on the corner of Hamilton Road (today part of the A723 road) and Muir Street (A721) had previously been occupied by residential properties with a public house on the corner itself.

The foundation stone for the new building was laid by the provost, Matthew Goodwin, with full masonic honours on 3 January 1887. It was designed by John Bennie Wilson in the Queen Anne style, built at a cost of £6,000 and was officially opened by the Duke of Hamilton on 5 December 1887. A concert performance by the Glasgow Select Choir was held to celebrate the event. The design involved an asymmetrical frontage with four bays facing Hamilton Road with the right hand bay containing a 120 foot (37 m) high five-stage clock tower with a dome; the central section featured an arched doorway on the ground floor flanked by pilasters with a fanlight above; there was a stone balcony and a double window on the first floor flanked by pilasters with a gable above containing a tympanum and an oculus. Internally, the principal room was a double-height public hall with seating capacity for 1,200 people in the centre of the building. The horse-drawn fire engine was also based at the town hall.

The local population continued to grow and, in January 1895, a public inquiry was held at the town hall to consider a proposal from the Parish of Dalziel, which at that time Motherwell formed part of, to annex parts of the parishes of Hamilton and Bothwell. It was also used as a concert venue, hosting artists such as the rock band T. Rex in May 1970.

The town hall continued to serve as the headquarters of the Burgh of Motherwell and Wishaw Council until it moved to Motherwell Civic Centre in December 1970. It also continued to operate as a concert venue and was one of the recording locations for Live from Scotland Volume 2 by the folk group, The Corries, in 1975. It subsequently became a leisure centre, operating for a while as a snooker hall known as "the Motherwell Town Snooker Club", and, more recently, as a laser tag arena known as "the Zone".

In 2021, having found no commercial tenants for the building in several years, North Lanarkshire Council announced plans to demolish much of the structure and replace it with residential flats, retaining the front facade, as "Unfortunately the actual hall structure does not lend itself to conversion... demolition of the hall can be justified as part of the project which secures the future of the remainder of the building."

== See also ==
- List of listed buildings in Motherwell And Wishaw, North Lanarkshire

== Sources ==
- Naismith, William (1 October 1899). History and Directory of Motherwell 1899-1900 (PDF).
