= The Knight and the Shepherd's Daughter =

Traditional song

"The Knight and the Shepherd’s Daughter" is an English ballad, collected by Francis James Child as Child Ballad 110 and listed as number 67 in the Roud Folk Song Index.

== Synopsis ==
A knight persuades a shepherd's daughter to give him her virginity. Afterward she chases after him to the royal court, on foot while he is on horseback, and demands marriage. He attempts to bribe her, but she insists he must marry her or be executed. After the marriage it is revealed, either by the woman herself or by Billy Blin, that she is in fact the daughter of royalty or high nobility; it may also be revealed that the man is a noble instead of a mere knight.

== Motifs ==
Her pursuit of the knight on foot while he is on horseback also appears in Child Ballad 63, "Child Waters", where it fits a very different plot. The motif is very similar to that of the loathly lady, particularly the variant found in Geoffrey Chaucer's "The Wife of Bath's Tale".

"Lise et Mainfroi", a 1740 French imitation of this ballad, has an actual shepherdess as the heroine; she announces at the altar that she is satisfied without the wedding, and the king and his court must persuade her to agree.

== See also ==
- "The Wylie Wife of the Hie Toun Hie"
- Der Ritter und die Magd

== Collected Versions ==
A version of the tune and lyrics were included by William Chappell in his 1859 book Popular Music of the Olden Time. Sabine Baring-Gould collected a version written in 1785, and notated another version he personally found in Lewdown, Devon in 1887, whilst Frank Kidson collected a version sung by a Benjamin Holgate of Leeds, West Yorkshire in 1891. The famous composer and folklorist Percy Grainger collected and notated a version in 1906 performed by William Roberts of Burringham, Lincolnshire, and another by Joseph Leaning of Brigg, Lincolnshire in 1908.

The song reached North America, where a handful of traditional versions were found to exist.

The folklorist Alan Lomax recorded John Strachan of Fyvie, Aberdeenshire singing a version in 1957, which is publicly available online. Many Scottish versions had previously been recorded by James Madison Carpenter in the 1930s. A later version was performed by Lizzie Higgins of Aberdeenshire in the 1970s, and is now available on the Vaughan Williams Memorial Library website.

Desmond and Shelagh Herring recorded Emily Sparkes of Rattlesden, Suffolk singing a version of the song in 1958, and another sung by Charlie Carver of nearby Tostock, both of which can be heard online via the British Library Sound Archive.

== Commercial Recordings ==
Steeleye Span recorded a version as "Royal Forester" on their 1972 album Below the Salt, based on the aforementioned recording of John Strachan by Alan Lomax.

There are various versions in the Argo Records series of ballads by Ewan MacColl and Peggy Seeger, The Long Harvest record 4.

Other recorded versions are by The Young Tradition on the album So Cheerfully Round (entitled "Knight William") and by Dave Burland on the album Dave Burland (entitled "Earl Richard").
