= The Mother's Malison =

Traditional song

The Mother's Malison or Clyde's Water (Child 216, Roud 91) is an English-language folk song.

== Synopsis ==
Willie, against his mother's wishes, goes to May Margaret's home, where he is not let in. On his way back home, he drowns in the Clyde. May Margaret wakes and says she dreamed of him. Her mother tells her that he had been there half an hour before. She goes after him and likewise drowns.

== Recordings ==
Following are some of the notable recordings of the ballad, including their artists, titles, albums, and years:

Artist	Title	Album	Year
Atwater & Donnelly	"Drowned Lovers"	And Then I'm Going Home	2001
Martin Carthy & Dave Swarbrick	"Clyde's Water"	Skin & Bone	1992
Nic Jones	"The Drowned Lovers"	Penguin Eggs	1980
Sean Lakeman & Kathryn Roberts	"The Drowned Lovers"	Sean Lakeman/Kathryn Roberts	2002
Ewan MacColl	"Clyde's Water"	Ballads: Murder Intrigue Love Discord	2010
Anaïs Mitchell & Jefferson Hamer	"Clyde Waters (Child 216)"	Child Ballads	2013
Stanley Robertson	"The Clattering of Clyde Waters"	Voice of the People, Vol. 6: O'er His Grave the Grass Grew Green	1999
Kate Rusby	"The Drowned Lovers"	Hourglass	1998
John Strachan	"Clyde's Water"	Classic Ballads of Britain and Ireland, Vol. 2	2000

== See also ==
- List of the Child Ballads
- The Lass of Roch Royal
