= Killiecrankie =

Village in Perth and Kinross, Scotland

Coordinates: 56°44′42″N 03°46′44″W

Killiecrankie: Scottish Gaelic: Coille Chreithnich
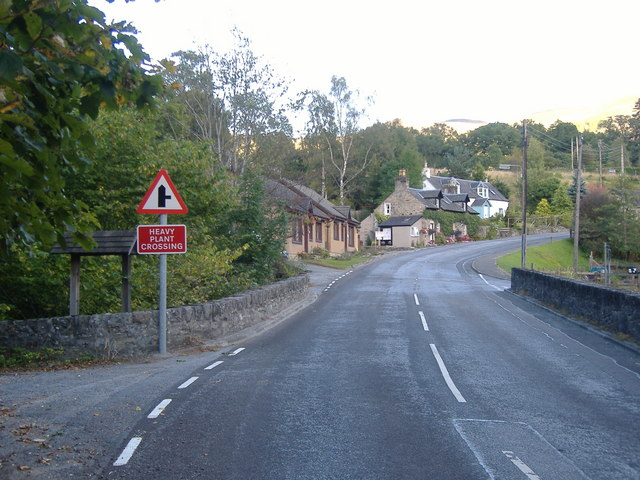
- Killiecrankie

- Location within Perth and Kinross
- OS grid reference: NN913628
- Civil parish: Moulin
- Council area: Perth and Kinross
- Country: Scotland
- Sovereign state: United Kingdom
- Police: Scotland
- Fire: Scottish
- Ambulance: Scottish
- UK Parliament: Angus and Perthshire Glens
- Scottish Parliament: Perthshire North

Killiecrankie (/ˌkɪliːˈkræŋkiː/; Scottish Gaelic: Coille Chreithnich, meaning "aspen wood") is a village in Perth and Kinross, Scotland on the River Garry. It lies at the Pass of Killiecrankie, by the A9 road which has been bypassed since 1986. The village is home to a power station forming part of the Tummel Hydro-Electric Power Scheme. Much of the riverbank is owned by the National Trust for Scotland. The nearby 10 arch railway viaduct, which runs for 109 yards (100 m) along the north-east bank of the River Garry, was built in 1863 from a design by Joseph Mitchell.

== History ==
In 1689, during the Jacobite Rebellion, the Battle of Killiecrankie was fought on the northern edge of the village. The Highland charge of the Jacobites took the government forces under General Hugh MacKay by surprise and completely overwhelmed them in only 10 minutes. Donald MacBean, one of William II of Scotland's supporters, having lost the contest, is said to have cleared the pass, from one bank to the other, at "The Soldier's Leap". One of the most famous leaders of the rebellion John Graham of Claverhouse, Viscount Dundee was killed in the battle. The battle is refenced in the 1816 Walter Scott novel Old Mortality. A Memorial Field to the fallen soldiers lies within the grounds of the category B listed Urrard House. An eponymous folk song, Braes o' Killiecrankie, commemorates the battle. A 1966 recording by The Corries was a pioneering use of the music video.

According to official records, the last wolf in Great Britain was killed near Killiecrankie in 1680.

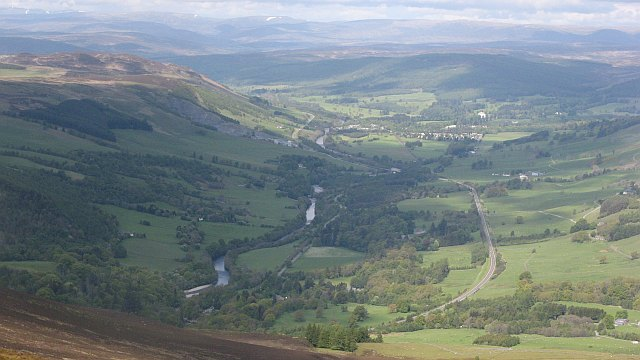
Glen Garry, taken from Meall Uaine, looking past Killiecrankie and Auldclune towards Blair Atholl

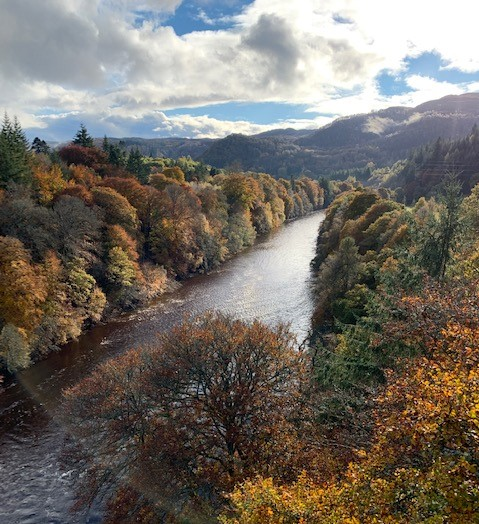
View from the bridge at Lin of Tummel

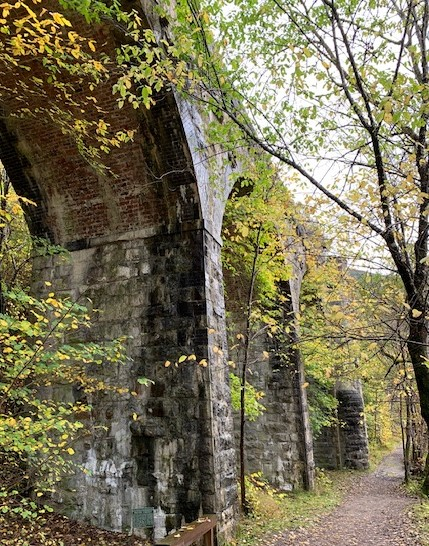
Killicrankie viaduct

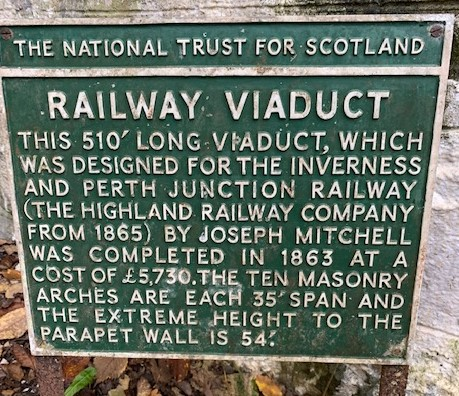
Information plaque about the Killiecrankie viaduct

== Television ==
Mary Ann Kennedy was the presenter of a BBC Four television series The Highland Sessions, which was filmed in Killiecrankie. Many notable musicians and singers from Ireland and Scotland performed in the sessions.
