= Paddy Bell =

Paddy Bell may refer to:

- Paddie Bell (1931–2005), Irish folk singer and musician
- Mary Bell (aviator) (1903–1979), Australian aviator
