= National anthem of Scotland =

National anthem

There is no official national anthem of Scotland. There have been discussions about a national anthem in the Scottish Parliament, but successive Scottish Governments have chosen to not prioritise legislating on the issue.

In some sporting events, "Flower of Scotland" is used as a Scottish national anthem. "Scotland the Brave" was used as a national anthem by the national football team, and by Scotland at the Commonwealth Games until 2010. Scotland's Commonwealth Games team adopted "Scotland the Brave" for use as a national anthem in 1958, replacing "Scots Wha Hae", which had been used since 1930.

== Current status ==
=== Flower of Scotland ===
Some Scotland sporting teams use "Flower of Scotland" as a national anthem, including the national football and rugby union teams. The song has also been used as the victory anthem of Scotland at the Commonwealth Games since 2010, replacing "Scotland the Brave".

"Flower of Scotland" was written in the mid-1960s by Roy Williamson, a member of the folk group the Corries, and was first performed in 1967 on BBC television. "Flower of Scotland" began being used as the pre-game anthem for the Scotland rugby union team during the 1990 Five Nations Championship, becoming popular particularly as Scotland won the Grand Slam in that season. By 1997 the Scottish Football Association (SFA) had also made "Flower of Scotland" the official pre-game national anthem for the Scotland national football team. "Flower of Scotland" had been used informally by the SFA for that purpose since 1993.

=== Scotland the Brave ===
"Scotland the Brave" was used by Scotland's team at the Commonwealth Games until the 2010 games, when it was replaced by "Flower of Scotland". "Scotland the Brave" was used at Commonwealth Games between 1958 and 2006; prior to 1958 "Scots Wha Hae" was used. The decision to use "Flower of Scotland" was made in January 2010 by athletes selected to participate in the 2010 games in Delhi. The shortlist of anthems also included "Scotland the Brave", "Loch Lomond" and "Highland Cathedral".

=== 2006 poll ===
In June 2006 the Royal Scottish National Orchestra conducted an opinion poll on their website, asking visitors to choose a favourite to be Scotland's national anthem. With over 10,000 votes cast, "Flower of Scotland" came first with 41 per cent of the votes, followed by "Scotland the Brave" with 29 per cent.

Tune	Votes (%)
"Flower of Scotland"	41%
"Scotland the Brave"	29%
"Highland Cathedral"	16%
"A Man's A Man for A' That"	7%
"Scots Wha Hae"	6%

Other songs which have been suggested include Robert Burns' "Auld Lang Syne" and Hamish Henderson's "Freedom Come-All-Ye". Both, from the 18th and 20th centuries, are written in Lowland Scots.

== Political discussion ==
There have been attempts to establish an agreed and official national anthem of Scotland. As of February 2024 the Scottish Government has not formally adopted a national anthem.

In 2004, lawyers for the Scottish Parliament advised that it was within the legal competence of the Scottish Parliament to choose a national anthem for Scotland, countering the suggestion that it would be a matter reserved to the Parliament of the United Kingdom. This prompted some interest in the idea, and a petition to the Scottish Parliament's petitions committee supported by the Scottish Greens was referred without recommendation to the Scottish Executive, but they decided to take no action, considering the issue not to be a political priority.

In May 2006. during a meeting of the Scottish Parliament's Enterprise and Culture Committee, Michael Matheson raised the issue, saying "during the recent Commonwealth Games in Melbourne, there was some debate about a Scottish national anthem, largely because a number of songs were being used as our national anthem. However, in recent discussions on the matter, no consensus was reached, other than on the point that we should have a national anthem". At the time, there were suggestions that the first minister, Jack McConnell, had said that a debate on an official national anthem for Scotland should take place to address the issue. In this meeting Murdo Fraser MSP expressed concerns over the three most popular anthems – "Flower of Scotland", "Scotland the Brave" and "Highland Cathedral". He stated "Flower of Scotland is inappropriate because some of the sentiments that are expressed in it are jingoistic and anti-English; Scotland the Brave is inappropriate because, although it is a good tune, it does not have words that match the upbeat nature of the music; and Highland Cathedral is a good tune, but it has no words at all".

=== Petition to parliament ===
On 13 January 2015 the Scottish Parliament heard evidence from Chris Cromar, a student who had brought forward a petition calling for the Scottish Government to formally recognise and adopt "Flower of Scotland" as the Scottish national anthem. In February 2015, the SFA replied to a written request from the Parliament regarding the petition. It had conducted a poll amongst members of the Scotland Supporter's Club and audiences on its social media platforms, with "Flower of Scotland" most popular. The SFA said that the narrow margin suggested "some food for thought" over what the national anthem should be, with "Scotland the Brave" retaining an affinity amongst Scotland's football supporters.

The Scottish Government responded that the "national song should be an anthem for all the people of Scotland with our diverse heritage and traditions. Scotland has many fine tunes, both traditional and contemporary, including ‘Flower of Scotland’, which could be stirring national anthems, but it is important that any choice has wide public support", and "consideration of whether Scotland should officially adopt a national anthem and if so, what that might be, should not be led by the Scottish Government or by any single political party"; it confirmed it had "no current plans in this regard" to adopt an anthem. The Public Petitions Committee subsequently closed the consideration of the petition after a brief discussion.
