= Mairi's Wedding =

Scottish folk song

Mairi's Wedding
Tune for Mairi's Wedding

"Mairi's Wedding" (also known as Marie's Wedding, the Lewis Bridal Song, or Scottish Gaelic: Màiri Bhàn "Blond Mary") is a Scottish folk song originally written in Gaelic by John Roderick Bannerman (1865–1938) for Mary C. MacNiven (1905–1997) on the occasion of her winning the gold medal at the Royal National Mòd in 1934. In 1959, James B. Cosh devised a Scottish country dance to the tune, which is 40 bars, in reel time.

== Origins ==
J. R. Bannerman, who composed the original song, was born in South Uist but left aged seven for Glasgow, where he later joined the General Post Office (GPO) as a telegraph boy and rose to become general superintendent. He was brought up in the Glasgow Gaelic community where most social activities were conducted in Gaelic and he developed a lifelong interest in the songs and literature of that culture. His son, John MacDonald Bannerman, became a well-known Gaelic broadcaster and singer, but was better known as a rugby international (37 caps for Scotland; Oxford Blue) and Liberal politician, ultimately being ennobled as John Bannerman, Baron Bannerman of Kildonan.

Mairi's Wedding was composed to recognise winning the Mòd gold medal, which is regarded as the highest singing award in Scottish Gaeldom. A track of Mary C. MacNiven singing her winning song at the 1934 Mòd is still available and the Mòd has founded a memorial salver competition to honour her name. Her wedding did not in fact take place until some six years later when she married Captain John Campbell of Glendale, Skye. She continued to sing at Gaelic concerts and céilidhs for most of her life, and died aged 91 at her native Portnahaven, Islay in 1997.

The song "Mairi's Wedding" was first performed for her at the Highlanders' Institute, then in Glasgow's Elmbank Street, and, at that time, a focal point of cultural and social activity for the Highlands and Islands community in the city. It was probably through this performance that Sir Hugh Roberton came to know the song.

Roberton was conductor of the Glasgow Orpheus Choir, which had by the early 1930s acquired international recognition under his leadership. His knighthood in 1931, promoted by his friend Ramsay MacDonald, whose radical politics he shared, established him as the leading British choirmaster and a towering figure within the Glasgow musical world. Although the choir had a vast repertoire, Roberton had inherited a particular fondness for folk music from his mother, and in addition to writing choral arrangements of traditional songs, he composed his own.

Roberton had collaborated with John R. Bannerman on other songs destined to become internationally successful. For the song "Joy of my Heart" Roberton wrote the English lyrics and asked Bannerman to produce a Gaelic version; the tune for the "Uist Tramping Song" was written by Bannerman with the English words by Roberton. John M. Bannerman claimed that his father had written the tune for the song "Westering Home" yet this was not acknowledged in Roberton's published scores. In a London court case in 1960 Sir Hugh's executors failed to prove that he had written the tune and costs were awarded to Miss (later Dame) Vera Lynn who had recorded "Travellin' Home" to the same tune, a recording which made 20th place in the music charts.

Roberton wrote the English words for "Mairi's Wedding", which, as can be seen by the lyrics below in both languages, bore little resemblance to Bannerman's original and make no reference to the original inspiration for the song, the winning of a Mòd gold medal. He published this in 1936, giving the song the alternative title of "The Lewis Bridal Song". Roberton presented an original signed copy of his score to Mary C. MacNiven and it became one of her most prized possessions. When the song was published in Roberton's "Songs of the Isles" by J Curwen & Sons Ltd (1951), the Gaelic words did not appear. J.R. Bannerman was acknowledged as the composer of the original lyrics and tune.

== Lyrics ==
Bannerman's Gaelic version, with a literal translation into English by Anne Lorne Gillies, is:

Gaol mo chridhe-sa Màiri Bhàn,
Màiri bhòidheach, sgeul mo dhàin,
'S i mo ghaol-sa Màiri bhàn,
'S tha mi dol ga pòsadh.

Thuit mi ann an gaol a-raoir,
Tha mo chridh-sa shuas air beinn;
Màiri Bhàn rim thaobh a' seinn,
'S tha mi dol ga pòsadh.

Cuailean òir is sùilean tlàth,
Mala chaol is gruaidh an àigh,
Beul as binne sheinneas dàn,
'S tha mi dol ga pòsadh.

'S ann aig cèilidh aig a' Mhòd
Fhuair mi eòlas air an òigh;
'S ise choisinn am bonn òir,
'S tha mi dol ga pòsadh.

Bidh mo ghaol do Mhàiri Bhàn
Dìleas, dùrachdach gu bràth;
Seinnidh sinn da chèil' ar gràdh,
'S tha mi dol ga pòsadh.

Love of my heart, fair-haired Mary,
pretty Mary, theme of my song:
she's my darling, fair-haired Mary
and oh! I'm going to marry her.

Last night I fell in love
and now my heart is soaring high; (lit. "up on a mountain")
fair-haired Mary singing by my side
and oh! I'm going to marry her!

Golden hair and kindly eyes,
shapely brow and smiling cheeks,
sweetest voice that ever sang
and oh! I'm going to marry her.

It was at a cèilidh at the Mòd
that I got to know the girl:
she was the winner of the gold medal
and oh! I'm going to marry her.

My love for Fair-haired Mary will be
eternally faithful and heartfelt;
we'll sing together of our love
and oh! I'm going to marry her.

Sir Hugh Roberton's lyrics begin with the chorus:

Step we gaily, on we go,
Heel for heel and toe for toe,
Arm and arm and row on row,
All for Mairi's wedding.

Over hill-ways up and down,
Myrtle green and bracken brown,
Past the shielings, through the town;
All for sake o' Mairi.

Red her cheeks as rowans are,
Bright her eye as any star,
Fairest o' them a' by far,
Is our darling Mairi.

Plenty herring, plenty meal,
Plenty peat to fill her creel,
Plenty bonnie bairns as weel;
That's the toast for Mairi.

== Recorded versions ==
- Sheridan Rúitín on their 2022 album Rebels in the Night
