= Uist Tramping Song =

Scottish folk song

The "Uist Tramping Song", "Null do dh'Uidhist" (Over to Uist) or "Tiugainn Leam" (Come With Me) is a traditional Scottish folk song, Gaelic lyrics by Archibald MacDonald, music by John R. Bannerman, arranged by Hugh S. Roberton. The song is an invitation to the sights and abundance of Uist, the central group of islands in the Outer Hebrides. The English language version tells of hiking there. Artists who have recorded this song include Kenneth McKellar, Robert Wilson and Robert Rees. Other notable recorded versions, include:

- The Corrie Folk Trio and Paddie Bell on the album The Promise of the Day (1965)
- David Solley on the album Great Songs of Scotland (1987)
- Moira Anderson on the album A Land for All Seasons (1996)
- Jackie Leven on the album For Peace Comes Dropping Slow (1998)
