= Fair Mary of Wallington =

Traditional song

Fair Mary of Wallington or Fair Lady of Wallington (Roud 59, Child 91) is a traditional English-language folk ballad. Francis James Child lists at least seven variants of the ballad. The first variant is titled "Fair Mary of Wallington", while another variant (variant C) is titled "The Bonny Early of Livingston".

== Synopsis ==
Two sisters had once been two of seven, but all their sisters had died in childbirth. The older vows never to marry, but is married off to a knight who lives in Wallington Hall. She becomes pregnant and sends for her mother when she is in childbed. She dies; in most variants, the baby has to be saved by cutting open her side. In many variants, the youngest sister vows never to marry, but her father insists that he will marry her off.

== Traditional Versions ==
The only version recorded from a source singer was James Madison Carpenter's recording of Bell Duncan (1849-1934) of Forgue, Aberdeenshire, Scotland; the original recording is available on the Vaughan Williams Memorial Library website.

== Breton Variant ==
A Breton ballad, Pontplancoat, appears too similar in form to this not to be from a common source: Pontplancoat marries a woman named Marguerite as his third wife. When he has to leave her, he dreams she has been three days in labor. Disturbed, he returned immediately to find it was true. Marguerite died, and the baby was saved by cutting open her side. This is his third son, both his earlier wives having died the same way.

== See also ==
- Scottish mythology
- English folklore
