= Wee Cooper O'Fife =

Song performed by Burl Ives

Wee Cooper o' Fife
Tune for Wee Cooper o' Fife

"Wee Cooper O'Fife" (Roud 117) is a Scottish folk song about a cooper who has "a braw new wife" who will not cook, clean, and sew in case she "spoil her comely hue". The title of the song is also a pun that plays on the name of Cupar, a town in Fife.

Verses get added, with one version having him put a sheep skin jacket on her and beating it. It was recorded by Burl Ives on 11 February 1941 for his debut album Okeh Presents the Wayfaring Stranger. It has also been recorded by Hedy West, Ed McCurdy, and Ian Campbell.

The Wee Cooper O'Fife is also the name of a Scottish country dance devised by Hugh Foss to fit the tune of the folk song, which is unusual in having ten-bar rather eight-bar phrases.

== Similar songs ==
Other versions of the song are known as "Dan Doo", "The Wife Wrapt in Wether's Skin" or "Little Old Man Lived Out West".

=== The Wife Wrapt in Wether's Skin ===
"The Wife Wrapt in Wether's Skin" is an English Child ballad 277. In this song, a man has married a woman of higher birth than him. She scorns the household labor. The man kills a wether (castrated male sheep), skins it, and wraps her in it. He declares that he can not beat her, but he can certainly beat a wether's skin. She recants her refusal and works.

In other variants, such as "Ruggleton's Daughter of Iero", he does not have a pretext for beating her.

=== Dan Doo ===
Dan Doo is a British folk song that was brought to the United States. It was recorded by the Wisconsin Folk Song Recording Project. Max Hunter also recorded the song. The version he recorded is part of the Max Hunter Song Collection at the University of Missouri. Frank Proffitt recorded it on Frank Proffitt Sings Folk Songs on Folkways Records. It has been published as a children's ballad and a folk song. Versions performed by Fred Smith and Frank Payne have also been recorded.

The Library of Congress has a version of the song sung by Charles Dietz and recorded in Monroe, Wisconsin by Leland Coon in 1946.

The Library of Congress has a recording of it.

=== Risseldy Rosseldy ===
An American variation of the song, entitled "Risseldy Rosseldy", was sung by the school children in the 1963 film The Birds right before they were attacked by a swarm of birds. "Risseldy Rosseldy" was also featured as a musical number in Wee Sing in Sillyville.

== Popular culture ==
The song was part of the South Park Season "The Scoots", which is the fifth episode of the 22nd season.

== See also ==
- Peat Fire Flame, an album by The Corries
- List of Scottish country dances
