= The White Fisher =

Traditional song

The White Fisher is Child ballad 264, and number 3888 in the Roud Folk Song Index.

== Synopsis ==
A man tells his wife that they have been married only one month and asks why the child is quickening. The woman blames her pregnancy on a priest, or on a kitchen boy. When she gives birth, she tells her husband to toss the baby in the sea to drown, or, in some variants to sink or swim, but not return to her without a white fish. Instead, he takes the baby to his mother and claims that he had a sweetheart over the sea, and this is his child. The wife grieves and refuses a drink from him, because having drowned her baby, he would poison her. He tells her that his mother has the child. In some variants, he tells her that she may see him as long as she does not call the child hers.

== Traditional Recordings ==
The song has been recorded twice from traditional singers; both were recorded in Aberdeenshire, Scotland by James Madison Carpenter in the early 1930s, and can be heard on the Vaughan Williams Memorial Library website: one is sung by Bell Duncan of Forgue and the other by Elizabeth Robb of Strichen.

== See also ==
- Gil Brenton
