= Mary C. MacNiven =

Gaelic Singer and muse

Mary Connell MacNiven
- Born: 15 September 1905
- Died: 25 March 1997 (aged 91)
- Occupation: Gaelic Singer

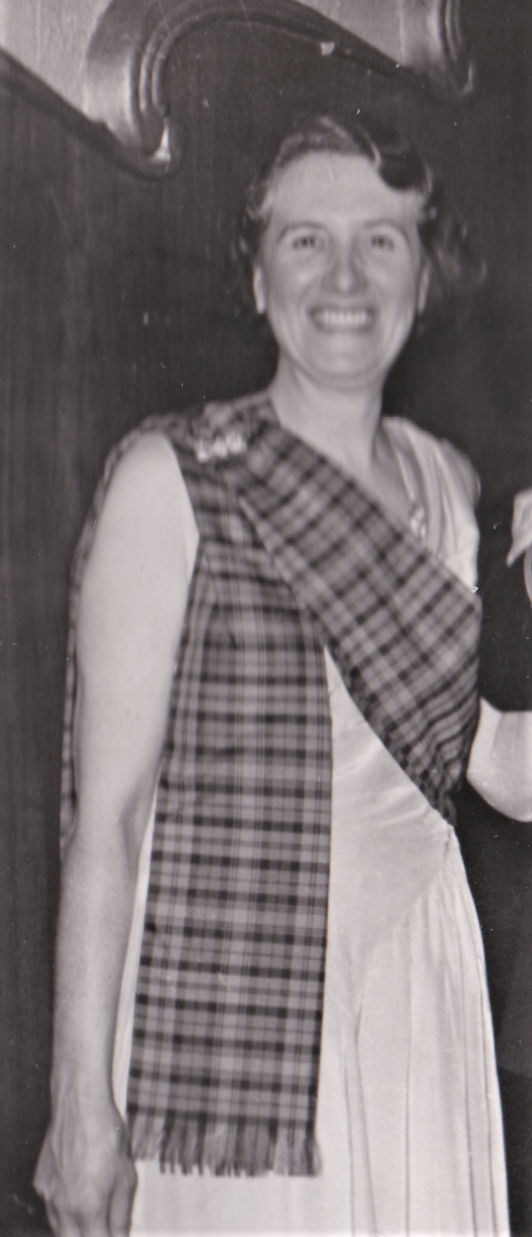

Mary Connell MacNiven, born McNiven and sometimes billed as Mrs Campbell/Mrs John Campbell (15 September 1905 – 25 March 1997) was a Gaelic singer and the inspiration behind the famous Scottish song Mairi's Wedding.

== Early life and family ==
Mary Connell McNiven (later changed to MacNiven) was born in Glasgow on 15 September 1905. She was one of eight children born to Dugald McNiven (1856–1933), a grain storeman, and Christina McNiven, née Connell (1863–1949). Her parents were both originally from the island of Islay, her father was born near the village of Bowmore and her mother was from Portnahaven. The family grew up in the community of Scottish Gaels that thrived in Glasgow in the first half of the 20th century. Following her marriage in 1941, The Oban Times described how “…Islay rightly claims her as one of its own…”

== Singing career ==
Having competed for several years in the annual National Mòd, winning “high recommendation for her performances” (Scotsman 28 Sept 1934), in Sept 1933 she was a very close runner-up in the ladies’ solo gold medal competition, losing by one point to Madge Campbell Brown. The final decision at this Mod held in Glasgow was made following a sing-off between both competitors before the judges.

In the 1934 Mod, held in Oban, she beat Catherine M. Clark to the solo women's gold medal award. She also won first place that year in mixed gender competitive category “Solo singing of a Song – To encourage the revival of the older or less known district songs” and second place in two further competitions, singing a duet with Chrissie Nicolson and giving a solo rendition one of the songs of the Lorn Bards. “The musical adjudicators spoke in high terms of her voice and manner of interpretation.”

She became a regular fixture on BBC radio, singing Gaelic songs and billed as either a soprano or mezzo-soprano. Mentions of her broadcast performances can be found in the radio listings from the latter 1930s to the 1950s.

Her obituary notes that she was “undoubtedly one of the great stars in Gaelic entertainment during the heydays of the mod gold medallists” in the decades either side of the middle of the 20th century. Already “a popular singer at Highland gatherings in Glasgow” at the time of her Mod win, following her gold medal success she would headline performances in venues all over Scotland, from ceilidhs in village halls to solo and group performances in concert halls.

In 1935, the noted folklorist F. Marian McNeill listed Mary “as chief amongst our exponents of Gaelic Song” along with Margaret Duncan, Jenny Currie, Morag Macdonald, Madge Campbell Brown and Margaret MacInnes.

While living in Glasgow she also sang with the St Columba Church of Scotland, Glasgow Gaelic church choir and was a stalwart of the Glasgow Musical Association. She also made appearance at later national mods, distributing prizes, and for over seven decades she was a member of the Glasgow Islay Association, holding several offices within the organisation, including president and even appeared on stage at its 135th Islay Gathering the Glasgow City Halls less than three weeks before she died.

== "Mairi’s Wedding" ==
To mark her success in the 1934 Mod, John Roderick Bannerman (the father of John Bannerman, Baron Bannerman of Kildonan) who was elected President of An Comunn Gàidhealach that year, wrote the Gaelic song Mairi Bhan (Fair-haired Mairi) in her honour and set it to a traditional Highland folk tune that had been collected by the piper Dr Peter. A. McLeod. The new song had its first airing in the presence of Mary MacNiven at the Highlanders’ Institute in Glasgow, a popular haunt of the city's Gaelic community.

Sir Hugh Roberton, founder of the Glasgow Orpheus Choir, who was a musical adjudicator at the Mod in previous years and a long-term collaborator of Bannerman, made an English translation of the song naming it “The Lewis Bridal Song” in his 1937 publication Songs of the Isles. Roberton's translation differed significantly from the Gaelic original. The catchy chorus, with its final line “All for Mairi’s wedding” stayed with audiences and gave the song its alternate, more popular title of “Mairi’s Wedding”. MacNiven was gifted the original hand-written score for the Lewis Bridal Song by Roberton, shortly after its release, and it was one of her most treasured possessions in later life.

Interviewed by the Daily Record ahead of her 90th birthday in 1995, MacNiven revealed her surprise at the song's popularity and longevity telling the journalist “ I can’t believe it became so popular. But when it was first played to me I found it very catchy – and I still do’.”

Mairi's Wedding
Tune for Mairi's Wedding

The song has since been covered by numerous musicians including Van Morrison, Andy Stewart, The Corries and Billy Connolly.

== Personal life ==
In August 1941, while working as a sewing machinist, she married John Campbell, an officer on active war service in the mercantile marine, who was from Glendale in Skye. Marie’s Wedding was not listed as being part of the entertainment at the ceremony or later celebrations in a published account of the day. The couple went on to have two children, Iain and Christine. She was occasionally billed as “Mrs Campbell”, “Mrs J. Campbell” or “Mrs John Campbell” when performing after her marriage, usually with her forename and maiden name in parentheses afterwards.

Following John's retirement the couple moved to Mary's mother's home village of Portnahaven in 1976. John died a year after they took up residence on Islay, but Mary remained in their home until she herself died in 1997.

== Legacy ==
The annual Mod now offers “The Mary C. Macniven Memorial Salver” as one of its 1st prize Gold Medal Heat trophies to female singers.
