= Wisconsin Folk Song Recording Project =

The Wisconsin Folk Song Recording Project is a University of Wisconsin and Library of Congress sponsored project carried out by Helene Stratman-Thomas and Leland A. Coon to record folk songs. The collection includes recordings, notes, and photographs gathered from 1937 to 1946. "Song catcher" Sidney Robertson Cowell was also involved in making recordings.

The collections include many vocal recordings as well as music performed on instruments including the accordion, guitar, Hardanger fiddle, psalmodikon, and tamburica. The original black and white photographs are stored with the Wisconsin Historical Society while the recordings are at the Archive of Folk Song, now the Archive of Folk Culture at the Library of Congress. The University of Wisconsin also has an extensive collection of material related to the endeavor and makes the recordings available at its Mills Library.

The project was interrupted for several years by World War II. Several songs in the collection relate to the timber and pinery industry. There are also other work songs, love songs, immigrant songs, Christmas carols, seafaring songs, and war songs.

Richard M. Dorson also studied the Midwest's folk music culture.

== Legacy ==
Folklorist Jim Leary followed up on their work with his Folksongs of Another America. In 2001 the Mills Library hosted a history of recorded sound exhibition featuring Helene Stratman Thomas and her work on the project.

== Recordings ==
Recordings included songs such as various versions of:

- The Little Brown Bull
- Jam on Gerry’s Rock

As well as imported songs such as:

- Dan Doo (English)
- "I’ll Sell My Hat", also known as "Shule Aroon" (Irish)
- Oh Yah, Ain’t That Been Fine (German dialect)

as well as regional songs such as:

- Emery De Noyer’s “Tomahawk Hem”
- Bert Taplin's “Old Hazeltine” and “Manson’s Crew”

Performers included Charles Dietz, a singer of English ballads.
