= Combolin =

Musical instrument

The combolin was invented by Roy Williamson of The Corries in the summer of 1969. The combolin combined several instruments into a single instrument. One version combined a mandolin with a guitar and four extra bass strings operated with slides. The other combined a guitar with a bandurria, a Spanish instrument Williamson had played since the early days of the Corrie Folk Trio.

Originally conceived as a way to combine several of the many instruments they carried around on tour - the Corries' long row of chairs behind them on stage bearing instruments is legendary - the combolins in fact became an additional two instruments for the tour van. Most often, Browne played the guitar/mandolin instrument with bass strings, and Williamson the other, which also had 13 sympathetic strings designed to resonate like the Indian sitar. The wood for the instruments was obtained from antique hardwood furniture as well as premium-grade Tyrolean spruce, and featured Williamson's artistic embellishments in silver and mother of pearl.

The Corries' album Strings and Things (1970) was designed to showcase the new instruments and featured detailed descriptions of them on the rear sleeve. Many consider it their best album. On stage, when the combolins were played, the Corries would swap their seating position around from the conventional Williamson to Browne's right. Usually the combolins were played to accompany long ballads such as "The Silkie of Sule Skerry" and "The Gartan Mother's Lullaby", as well as a number of the compositions of Peebles baker George Weir & Alister Rae, including "Lord Yester" and "Weep ye Weel by Atholl".

During her lifetime, Roy's late daughter, Karen Williamson, would have arguments with her sister Sheena as to who would inherit which of the combolins when The Corries retired. Apparently, the sisters had decided that the soundholes on the instruments gave one of them a 'sad' look, and the other 'angry', and, as Karen recounted in her biography of Roy, Flower of Scotland, hers was to have been the 'sad' one, and the 'angry' one was to have been Sheena's. However, the instruments passed to Roy's friend Davie Sinton instead.

The immense strain on the instruments caused by the multitude of strings meant they needed regular maintenance later in their life, and one of Williamson's best friends, instrument repairer David Sinton, maintained them. After Williamson's death, Sinton was bequeathed the two combolins. He has since issued a CD of tunes played on them, Caledonian Sunset.
