= The Wylie Wife of the Hie Toun Hie =

Traditional song

The Wylie Wife of the Hie Toun Hie (Child 290, Roud 125) is an Anglo-Scottish border ballad, existing in several variants, some of them fragmentary.

== Synopsis ==
A man expresses an interest in a woman. The hostler's wife lures her to him with an offer of fine wine. After he has his will of her, she demands his name. He may be an earl's son, an earl's younger (and landless) son, or a highland squire.

The variants diverge widely about the next event: the earl's son, two years later, sees the beautiful daughter she had with him; in both variants with the earl's younger son, he receives a commission; the highland squire sends for her (without explaining why he left her). But whichever event occurs, it results in the man marrying her.

== See also ==
- List of the Child Ballads
- The Knight and the Shepherd's Daughter
