= Crow and Pie =

Traditional English folk-song

Song
- Written: c. 1500
- Genre: Folk

Crow and Pie (Roud 3975, Child 111) is an English-language folk song. It is one of the oldest preserved ballads, dating to c. 1500. Pie is the now-obsolete original name for the magpie, a bird often connected with sorrow and misfortune. The crow is a scavenger, often thought of as feeding upon the bodies of men hanged or slain in battle, and thus associated with unhallowed and violent death.

== Synopsis ==
A man encounters a woman in the woods and tries to seduce her, first offering her his love, then a ring and a velvet purse. In each case she repulses him, saying "the crow shall byte yow" (bite you). He rapes her. She requests first that he marry her, then that he give her "some of your good" (representing either a token of the lover's identity, or the "nurse's fee" for raising a bastard child), and finally that he tell her his name. In each case he refuses her, saying "For now the pye hathe peckyd yow" (clearly a sexual metaphor). Finally, she curses him, saying that she will not despair and will "recouer my harte agayne" (recover my heart again). The ballad contains a warning to young women to be suspicious, and avoid being raped.

== Motifs ==
This ballad contrast with Child Ballad 5, Gil Brenton, where the woman is able to prove the identity of her child's father by the tokens he gave her.

== Analysis ==
This ballad shows the thin line that existed in early Medieval society between seduction and rape; in either case the lady was held to be guilty of a misdeed, and her ability to prove the man's identity (and his acknowledgment of the event, even if he did not marry her) was as important from both a legal and moral standpoint as whether or not she gave consent. Inability to identify the man was generally held to be sufficient proof that the lady had been indiscriminately promiscuous, probably with her social inferiors.

The request by the lady in Crow and Pie for some of her rapist's goods may seem mercenary by modern standards, but is quite understandable from a medieval perspective. Money or a valuable token would indicate to the lady's parents (and her peers) that the man was not a serf, slave or beggar, and might serve as identification. In several other ballads a newly married woman avoids death at the hands of her husband, who has just discovered that she is with child, by producing a token left by her rapist; the token shows that the husband is the rapist, and he is therefore content.

Finally, Crow and Pie is unusual in that the lady, although angry and ashamed, is not despondent or suicidal and appears ready to resume her normal life.
