= The White Heather Club =

1958–1968 variety television series

The White Heather Club is a Scottish variety show that ran on and off from 7 May 1958 to 11 April 1968.

== History ==
It was an early evening BBC television programme. It started at 6.20, and Jimmy Shand composed a melody "The Six Twenty Twostep" as the theme tune. This was usually followed by Andy Stewart singing "Come in, come in, it's nice to see you...." The show always ended with Andy Stewart and the cast singing, "Haste ye Back":

Haste ye back, we loue you dearly, call again you're welcome here.
May your days be free from sorrow, and your friends be ever near.
May the paths o'er which you wander, be to you a joy each day.
Haste ye back we loue you dearly, haste ye back on friendship's way.

Robert Wilson, who in 1957 had been leading The White Heather Group, was an early presenter of the club and recorded with them. The show was so successful that in the early 1960s there was a company touring Scottish theatres, containing many of the performers. The show was broadcast from Glasgow, at that time the only large TV studio in Scotland, and produced by Iain MacFadyen, who went on to become the Head of Light Entertainment for BBC Scotland. By the Spring 1961 the series was given a wider audience when the series started broadcasting across the UK.

During the same period (1957–68) a New Year's Eve television programme, also called The White Heather Club, was used to herald in the Hogmanay celebrations. The show contained many of the same performers plus special guests such as Jimmy Logan and Stanley Baxter in comedy sketches. From 1957 to 1963 there was another programme called The Kilt is My Delight, along similar lines.

=== Hosts ===
- Robert Wilson (1957–1958)
- Andy Stewart (1958–1964)
- Robin Hall and Jimmie Macgregor (1964–1968)

== Performers ==
The performers were Jimmy Shand and his band, Ian Powrie and his band, Robin Hall and Jimmie Macgregor, Scottish country dancers: Dixie Ingram and the Dixie Ingram Dancers, the stars of the show: Heather Hall, Heather Wright, Heather Roberts, and Heather Hobbs, who is known affectionately as "Hobbit". The Corries, who performed on location rather than in the studio, were also staples of the show and later they were joined by singers Moira Anderson, Jimmy Urquhart (singer) and Kenneth McKellar. Andy Stewart was the master of ceremonies. He also sang songs and told jokes. All the male dancers, and Andy Stewart, wore kilts, and the women dancers wore long white dresses with tartan sashes. However, in the first show Stewart wore trousers and in the second he rented a kilt before having them tailored.

In 1965, Fontana Records issued an album called The White Heather Club, featuring Hall and McGregor. The duo issued dozens of folk albums, and even had a hit single "Football Crazy" (1960) during the period that show was broadcast. Andy Stewart had several hit singles, and The Corries albums continue to sell well today.

== Criticism ==
The Penguin TV companion in 2006 voted The White Heather Club one of the 20 worst TV shows ever. Jeremy Paxman, who gave the James MacTaggart Memorial Lecture at the 2007 Edinburgh International Television Festival cited The White Heather Club as evidence that there was no "Golden Age" of British television. Although popular in its day, and in some respects competently made, it put forward a tartanised view of Scotland that was becoming very dated by the late 1960s.
