= Prince Heathen =

Traditional song

Prince Heathen is Child ballad 104, existing in several variants. The ballad tells the story of a woman held captive by a prince, forcing her to have his child.

== Synopsis ==
The heroine—Margery May or Margaret—is raped by Prince Heathen, sometimes after he has tried to woo her. Sometimes he tells her he has massacred her family; in all variants, he imprisons her until she bears a child.

She has a son and weeps. She tells Prince Heathen she is not weeping for him but because she has nothing to wrap the baby in. His heart softening, the prince gives her silk to wrap the baby in and milk to bath him in, and declares his love for her.

== Similar ballads ==
A similar ballad, Gil Brenton, features the hero who finally desires to treat the baby well. His motive is the final evidence that the baby is his, and not the softening of heart that Prince Heathen manifests.

== Recordings ==
- Prince Heathen (1969) Martin Carthy, (with Dave Swarbrick); and previously unreleased John Peel session, issued on Classic Carthy (2001), Free Reed: FRCD 61
- Prince Heathen (2016) The Furrow Collective, issued on Wild Hog (2016), Hudson Records

== See also ==
- Scottish mythology
- English folklore
