= Scotland the Brave =

Scottish patriotic song

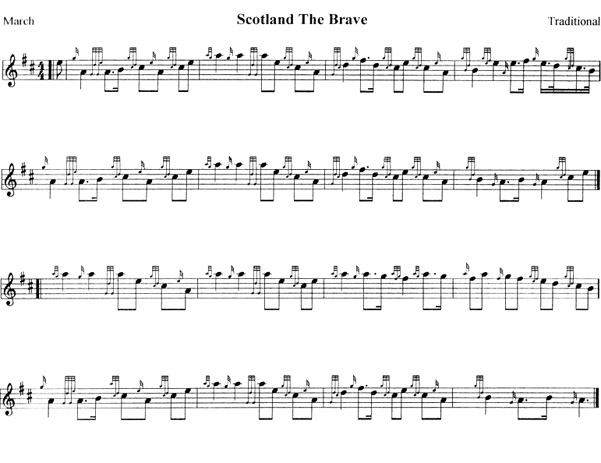
- Unofficial anthem of Scotland
- Lyrics: Cliff Hanley (unofficial), 1950
- Music: Traditional
- Published: 1870s

Audio sample
- "Scotland the Brave" (instrumental): file; help

"Scotland the Brave" is a Scottish patriotic song, one of three often considered an unofficial Scottish national anthem (the others being "Flower of Scotland" and "Scots Wha Hae").

== History ==
The tune probably originated in the late 19th century. The earliest known printing of the tune was in the Utah Musical Bouquet in January 1878, and the earliest known version printed in Scotland is in The National Choir in 1891.

The lyrics commonly used now were written in about 1950 by the journalist Cliff Hanley for the singer Robert Wilson as part of an arrangement by Marion McClurg. Another set of lyrics also often heard was sung by the Canadian singer John McDermott; they are closely based on the poem "Let Italy Boast" by James Hyslop, which was first published in 1821 in The Edinburgh Magazine. However, Hyslop intended his poem to be sung to the melody of Sir Walter Scott's "Boat Song" from "The Lady of the Lake" and not "Scotland the Brave".

"Scotland the Brave" is also the authorised pipe band march of the British Columbia Dragoons of the Canadian Armed Forces.

"Scotland the Brave" was played before matches involving the Scottish national football team at the 1982, 1986, and 1990 FIFA World Cups. "Flower of Scotland" was subsequently adopted by Scotland for use at FIFA-sponsored events, after its usage by the Scottish national rugby union team.

In June 2006 the song rated second in an online poll with more than 10,000 votes to determine Scotland's favourite unofficial anthem, losing to "Flower of Scotland". The song was used to represent Scotland in the Commonwealth Games until it was replaced by "Flower of Scotland" from the 2010 games onwards.
