= Jam on Gerry's Rock =

Folk song

Jam on Gerry’s Rock, alternatively written as Jam on Jerry's Rock, is a folk song. It has been recorded by the Wisconsin Folk Song Recording Project, The Limeliters, Pete Seeger, and the Mallett Brothers. The song is about a young foreman warning his colleagues as he is about to break up a log jam on a river. After the surge he is eventually found bruised, bloodied, and dead downstream, with the song serving as tribute.

There has been research and speculation on the song's origins. There are various title variations and iterations of the song. It is generally associated with Maine.
