= Football Crazy =

1880s song by James Curran

"Football Crazy" is a song written by James Curran, originally titled as "The Dooley Fitba' Club", in the 1880s. The song is the earliest-known song that references association football, and it later became a minor hit in the 1960s for Scottish folk music duo Robin Hall and Jimmie Macgregor.

== Background ==
"Football Crazy" is derived from a humorous song written by a songwriter from Glasgow, James Curran (sometimes spelt as 'Currin') who died in 1900. He originally wrote the song as "The Dooley Fitba' Club" and it was sung by J.C. M'Donald. The song is the earliest known song which refers specifically to football.

It was later adapted into the comedic "Fitba' Crazy" with many lyrical changes. Ewan MacColl included a version of "Fitba' Crazy" in a collection of songs called Scotland sings published in 1953, and Personal choice by Ewan MacColl of Scottish folksongs and ballads in 1954. He also recorded the song for his album Scots Street Songs in 1956.

In 1960, the Scots folk music duo Robin Hall and Jimmie Macgregor released a single based on the MacColl version. It was released by Decca Records (45-F 11266) but failed to reach the UK Singles Chart, despite television exposure on the BBC's Tonight programme.

The song has been covered by various other singers, including Rolf Harris who released a single in 1966 to coincide with the World Cup held in England, and as "Fitba' Crazy" by Adam McNaughtan on his 1983 album Words Words Words.

== In popular culture ==
The phrase "football crazy" came into popular use during the 1960s, following the song's success, and was extended into the common phrase it is today, often paraphrased. Amongst other things, it has been the title of:

- A 1981 episode of Metal Mickey
- A 1982 episode of The Goodies
- A 1994 film
- A 1999 TV documentary
- A 2000 episode of Taggart
- An ESPN TV sports show
