= Bell Duncan =

Scottish singer

Bell Duncan (8 August 1849 – 5 January 1934), also known as Isobel, Isabella and Elizabeth, was a traditional singer from Aberdeenshire, Scotland.

She was born in Forgue, Aberdeenshire in 1849, to George Duncan (1814-1903) a farmer, and Jane Duncan (née Hutcheon) (1807-1884), from whom she learnt most of her songs. She worked as a housekeeper and had three children.

She had an enormous repertoire of around 300 traditional songs which were recorded by the song collector James Madison Carpenter, including 60 of the Child Ballads, many of which have never been recorded from the mouths of any other source singer. Hundreds of Carpenter's recordings of Bell Duncan are available on the Vaughan William Memorial Library website with Carpenter's transcriptions of the lyrics, including her performances of ballads such as The Elfin Knight, Geordie, Lord Bateman, Barbara Allen, Binorie, and other far rarer old ballads such as The White Fisher, Fair Mary of Wallington and The Gardener Lad.
