= Gil Brenton =

Traditional song

"Gil Brenton" (Child 5, Roud 22) is an English-language folk song, existing in several variants.

== Synopsis ==
A man (often described as a king or lord) has brought home a foreign woman to be his wife.

In several variants, the bride is warned that if she is not a maiden (i.e., virgin), she had best send someone else to take her place in the marriage bed, in order to prevent her husband from discovering this fact. She sends her maid in her place. The morning after the wedding, the groom asks the blankets and sheets of the bed, or in some versions the household spirit Billie Blin, if he married a maiden, and they answer that the woman he married was not, and furthermore, she is pregnant.

In other variants, the bride informs the bridegroom of her pregnancy without any tests.

The groom laments this state of affairs to his mother, who goes to tax his bride with it. The mother-in-law asks who the father of the baby is, and the bride tells how she had gone to the greenwood to gather flowers and been detained there until evening by a man. When he allowed her to return home, this man gave her several tokens (e.g., a lock of hair, some black beads, a golden ring, and a pen-knife). The mother demands the tokens, takes them to her son, and asks him what he had done with the tokens that she (the mother) had given to him. He tells her that he gave them to a lady, and he would give anything to have that lady as his wife. She assures him that his wish has been granted.

When the baby is born, there is writing on his body declaring that he is the son of the hero. The hero may show his pleasure by the number of kisses given to wife and son, or by having the lady dressed in silk and the baby bathed in milk.

== Commentary ==
One of the ballad variants is titled "Cospatrick" and features a hero of that name. The name was used at different times by several earls of Dunbar and Home, and the ballad may have become attached to one of them as a legend.

== Variants ==
Besides the variants in English, there are several Scandinavian variants; Swedish and Danish ones are particularly close. In The Types of the Scandinavian Medieval Ballad, these correspond chiefly to ballad types D 415–422, all of which end with the revelation of bridegroom as violator; of these, D 420 and 421 feature a speaking rug, although a nightingale sometimes takes it place. Some variations occur: in some ballads, the hero had broken into the heroine's bower rather than found her in the woods; the hero may recognize her on the strength of her story, without any tokens; or her condition may be revealed by difficulty riding a horse. It contrasts with the Child Ballad "Crow and Pie", where the raped woman tries to obtain some token from the rapist, and is refused.

The difficulty riding because of a pregnancy also features in the ballad "Leesome Brand".

The fairy tale Little Annie the Goose-Girl makes use of many of these elements, but the heroine of the story, Annie or Aase, is not the bride but the maiden who substitutes for her; the revelation of three successive princesses not being maidens results in the hero's marrying the goose-girl who had substituted for them.

The substitution of a maiden for the non-virgin bride is found earlier in many forms of the legend of Tristan and Iseult; Iseult, having lost her virginity to Tristan on the journey, substitutes her maid Brangwin.

== See also ==
- List of the Child Ballads
- Hind Etin
- Tam Lin
- The White Fisher
- Prince Heathen
