= Bonny Baby Livingston =

Traditional song

Bonny Baby Livingston or Bonny Baby Livingstone (Roud 100, Child 222) is an English-language folk song, existing in many variants. The ballad tells the story of a girl abducted and taken to the Scottish Highlands. She is able to get a message to her love, who, depending on the variation, is able to save her.

== Synopsis ==
A girl named Barbara, Barbra, Annie, or Baby Livingstone is kidnapped by Glenlion (or Glenlyon, Linlyon, or Glendinning). In most variants, he rapes her before or after he carries her home. In one variant, they stop to meet his brother, John, and stay at Auchingour. She gets a letter to her love at Dundee, by hiring a young boy. In some variants this lover, Johny Hay, arrives. She escapes through a window, and they make their get-away. In most, he arrives to find her dead, and is able only to kiss her dead lips and curse her kidnapper. In another variant, Jemmie arrives to Glendinning Castle to find Annie Livingstone dead.

== See also ==
- Scottish mythology
