= The Gardener (ballad) =

English ballad, Child no. 219

The Gardener is Child ballad 219 (Roud 339); also called "Proud Maisrie" or "The Gardener Child", the collection includes several variants, many fragmentary.

== Synopsis ==
A gardener woos a lady, proposing to dress her in various flowers. She rejects him with a suggestion that he wear snow and other wintry weather.
