= Willie and Earl Richard's Daughter =

Traditional song

- Catalogue: Child 102; Roud 3910
- Genre: Folk
- Melody: Willie o Douglas Dale; Leesome Brand

Willie and Earl Richard's Daughter (Child 102, Roud 3910) is a traditional English-language folk ballad. It recounts the birth of Robin Hood, but is not part of the Robin Hood cycle; Francis James Child rejected the title The Birth of Robin Hood for it on those grounds.

== Synopsis ==
Willie, or Archibald, and the earl's daughter fall in love, and she becomes pregnant. They steal away to the woods, where she gives birth to a son. In some variants, she survives and nurses him; in others, she dies, and Archibald laments that his son's being alive makes matters worse because he can not nourish the boy. The earl comes after and recovers the boy, and his daughter, dead or alive. He kisses his grandson and makes him his heir.

== Motifs ==
The motifs for this ballad come from Willie o Douglas Dale and Leesome Brand.

== Performances ==
The ballad was recorded by Spiers and Boden under the title The Birth of Robin Hood on their 2008 album Vagabond; a new recording appeared on their 2011 album The Works, with harmony vocals by Eliza Carthy.
