= Jimmie Macgregor =

Scottish folksinger and broadcaster (born 1930)

Jimmie Macgregor MBE
- Born: 10 March 1930 (age 95); Glasgow, Scotland

Jimmie Macgregor (born 10 March 1930) is a Scottish folksinger and broadcaster, best known as half of a singing duo with Robin Hall.

== Biography ==
Jimmie Macgregor was born in Springburn, Glasgow, Scotland, and grew up in a tenement and then a council house, about which he has said: "Our house was a focus for people to gather and make music.... I had aunties and cousins who were chorus girls." After doing his national service, he studied at Glasgow School of Art, graduating in the mid-1950s and becoming a potter and teacher.

=== Partnership with Hall ===
In 1960, Macgregor formed a musical partnership with Robin Hall that would last 20 years. They appeared extensively on BBC Television – both on the Tonight programme and on the White Heather Club. Both also played as part of The Galliards with Leon Rosselson and Shirley Bland.

Hall and Macgregor recorded over 20 albums during their partnership, which ended in 1981. One of their most successful singles was the anthem "Football Crazy", released in 1960 on Decca Records.

=== Television and radio work ===
Macgregor went on to make television programmes for BBC Scotland, many on long-distance walking, including In the Footsteps of Bonnie Prince Charlie, On The West Highland Way, and Macgregor Across Scotland. He also made Macgregor's Gathering, a long-running show for Radio Scotland. He has been involved in various conservation organisations, among them the Association for the Protection of Rural Scotland, and was awarded the MBE in 1994 for services to Scottish heritage and culture.
