= Leesome Brand =

Traditional song

Leesome Brand (Roud 3301, Child 15) is an English-language folk song.

== Synopsis ==
Leesome Brand went to court when ten years old. An eleven-year-old girl fell in love with him, but nine months later, called on him to saddle horses, take her dowry, and flee with her. They headed to his mother's house, but she went into labour on the way. He went off to hunt, but violated a prohibition she laid on him, either not to hunt a milk-white hind, or to come running when called, and she and his son died. He went home and lamented this to his mother.

Some variants stop there. In others, the mother gave him a horn with ointment that restored them both to life.

== Variants ==
Francis James Child described this ballad as particularly ill-preserved in its Scottish form, requiring consulting foreign variants even to be sure of the plot. One of its variants was so corrupted as to be barely distinguishable from "Sheath and Knife", Child Ballad 16, which laments a death in the same language.

The foreign variants of this ballad include Scandinavian, German, and French forms.

The heroine's difficulty riding, because of her advanced pregnancy, also features in some Scandavian variants of "Gil Brenton".

"Willie o Douglas Dale" and "Willie and Earl Richard's Daughter" include similar flights, of the lovers, with the woman being pregnant and giving birth in the woods, although with altered endings.

== See also ==
- List of the Child Ballads
