= Tonight (1957 TV programme) =

BBC television current affairs programme from 1957 to 1965

- Country of origin: United Kingdom

Production
- Producers: Donald Baverstock; Alasdair Milne

Original release
- Release: 18 February 1957 – 18 June 1965

Tonight is a British current affairs television programme, presented by Cliff Michelmore, that was broadcast on BBC live on weekday evenings from 18 February 1957 to 18 June 1965. The producers were the future Controller of BBC1 Donald Baverstock and the future Director-General of the BBC Alasdair Milne. The audience was typically seven million viewers.

== Background ==
Tonight like Six-Five Special, was created by the BBC to fill in the "Toddlers' Truce" closed period between 6.00pm and 7.00pm (the "Truce" was officially abolished only a few days before Tonight was first broadcast). Tonight began broadcasting from the Viking studio in Kensington, known by the BBC as "studio M". It eventually transferred to one of the main studios in Lime Grove, Shepherd's Bush, west London.

== Content and style ==
The programme covered the arts and sciences as well as topical matters and current affairs. There was a mixture of incisive and light-hearted items: unscripted studio interviews, by Derek Hart, Geoffrey Johnson-Smith and Michelmore himself; and filmed reports. Reporters included Alan Whicker, Fyfe Robertson, Kenneth Allsop, Chris Brasher, Julian Pettifer, Brian Redhead and Polly Elwes.

The style was informal with no attempt to hide studio equipment. Michelmore gave a very relaxed performance, sometimes perching on the edge of his desk, seemingly unfazed by the ringing of his desk telephone letting him know about technical problems. There were regular appearances by Rory McEwen, Cy Grant, singing a "topical calypso", and folk singers Robin Hall and Jimmie Macgregor. Michelmore became known for his catchphrase when closing the show, "That's all for tonight, the next 'Tonight' will be tomorrow night. Until then, good night!"

It was during an edition of Tonight broadcast on the evening of Friday 22 November 1963 that BBC television broke the news of the assassination of United States President John F. Kennedy to UK viewers, although Granada Television had already broadcast the news in its northern ITV region.

In 1964, Bob Dylan appeared on the programme and sang With God on Our Side.

== Accolades ==
The programme received the Guild of Television Producers and Directors Awards (now BAFTA) for Best Factual Programme in 1957 and 1958.

== Tonight (1975 TV programme) ==
A new programme under the name, presented by Sue Lawley, Denis Tuohy and Donald MacCormick, was launched on BBC1 in September 1975, in a late evening slot. When Lawley left to have a baby, Valerie Singleton replaced her on the show, which continued until July 1979. Newsnight, which was intended to launch two months later but ended up launching six months later in January 1980 on BBC2, was its replacement.
