= Der Ritter und die Magd =

German folk song

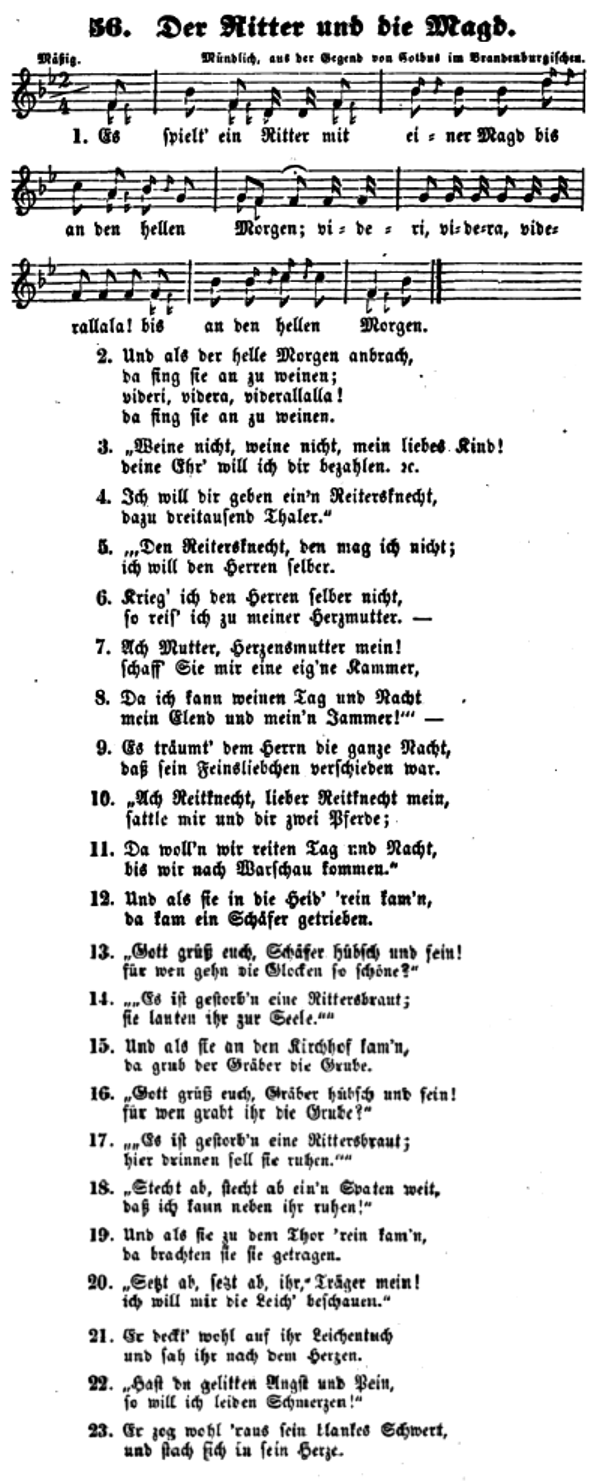
Melody and text, 1843

"Der Ritter und die Magd" (The Knight and the Maid) is a traditional German folk song. It was included by Clemens Brentano and Achim von Arnim in their 1806 collection of German folk songs and poems, Des Knaben Wunderhorn. As its possible source, both editors used a German broadside printed before 1790. Another version of the song, published in Die deutschen Volkslieder mit ihren Singweisen (1843) was recorded from an oral source near Cottbus.

== Synopsis ==
A knight "plays" with his maid and makes her pregnant. He offers her five hundred thaler and to give her in marriage to his servant, but she refuses and returns to her mother in Augsburg. The mother suggests to throw the child into the river. The young woman, however, decides to keep the child, and anticipates her own death. The knight sees in a dream that his maid has died in childbirth. He wakes up and orders his servant to saddle two horses. Near Augsburg they meet four men bearing a dead woman, and the knight recognizes her. He asks his servant to bury him with her and kills himself with his sword. The maid gets buried in the church yard, the knight however below the gallows. Three months later a lily grew from his grave, and on its leaves was inscribed that they both were together in heaven.

== Commentary ==
Goethe described the song as "dark romance" (dunkel romantisch) and "violent" (gewaltsam). One source points out that Goethe ends his 1774 play Clavigo in the same way: the repentant hero appears too late, his dead lover's already carried by pallbearers.

According to Ferdinand Rieser, the song was published in Des Knaben Wunderhorn (1806) with only one change: the editors replaced mit einer Dam (with a dame) by mit seiner Magd ("with his maid") in the first line of the first couplet. This line was changed again in the 1843 songbook to mit einer Magd (with a maid). Some scholars classified "Der Ritter und die Magd" as a ballad.
