= The Laird o Drum =

Traditional song

The Laird o Drum (Roud 247, Child 236) is an English-language folk song, originating in Scotland. Francis James Child collected six versions, labeled A to F, all based on Alexander Irvine's courtship of and marriage to Margaret Coutts, his second wife. Though the events depicted in the ballad took place in the late 1600s, the earliest version of the ballad dates back to the early 1800s.

== Synopsis ==
The lord of Drum goes to woo a shepherd lass. She does not believe him but sends him to her father, who gives his consent. His brother claims that it disgraces the family. The lord says that his brother wedded a wife to spend money, and he a wife to work and win; he had a lady of higher birth than he was, and she treated him as lowly. When they are in bed, the shepherdess says they are now equal. Once they were buried, no one would be able to tell their mould apart.
