= Robin Hall =

Scottish folksinger (1936–1998)

Robin Hall (27 June 1936 – 18 November 1998) was a Scottish folksinger, best known as half of a singing duo with Jimmie Macgregor. Hall was a direct descendant of the famous Scottish folk hero and outlaw Rob Roy MacGregor as well as of the explorer Mungo Park.

== Biography ==
Hall was born in Edinburgh but spent his childhood years in Glasgow and was educated at Allan Glen's School. After studying at the Royal Scottish Academy of Music and Drama, he briefly became an actor.

He formed a musical partnership with Jimmie Macgregor in 1960, and they appeared extensively on BBC Television – on the Tonight programme, on the White Heather Club, and as the hosts of the seminal London Folk Song Cellar. During this period Hall's wearing of a CND badge on television caused some controversy.

Both Hall and Macgregor also played as part of the Galliards with Leon Rosselson and Shirley Bland during the 1960s.

Overall, Hall and Macgregor made over 20 albums during their partnership, which ended in 1981. One of their most successful singles was the anthem "Football Crazy", released in 1960 on Decca Records.

Hall went on to make radio programmes for Radio Clyde.

=== Death ===
His body was found by police on 18 November 1998 at his home in Queen Margaret Drive, Glasgow, where he had lived alone since the end of his second marriage. He appeared to have died some days earlier.
