= Willie o Douglas Dale =

Traditional song

- Genre: Folk
- Form: Ballad
- Language: English
- Composed: Somewhere between in the 17th and 18th century

Willie o Couglas Dale or Willie O Douglas Dale (Roud 65, Child 101) is a traditional English-language folk song.

== Synopsis ==
Willie goes to court, and he and a lady fall in love. When she is pregnant, they flee, but she goes in labor on the way, and gives birth to a son. They go on with the child and reach his father's lands.

== Motifs ==
This ballad contains elements from "Willie and the Earl Richard's Daughter" and to a lesser extent "Leesome Brand".
