= Robert Wilson (tenor) =

Scottish tenor (1907–1964)

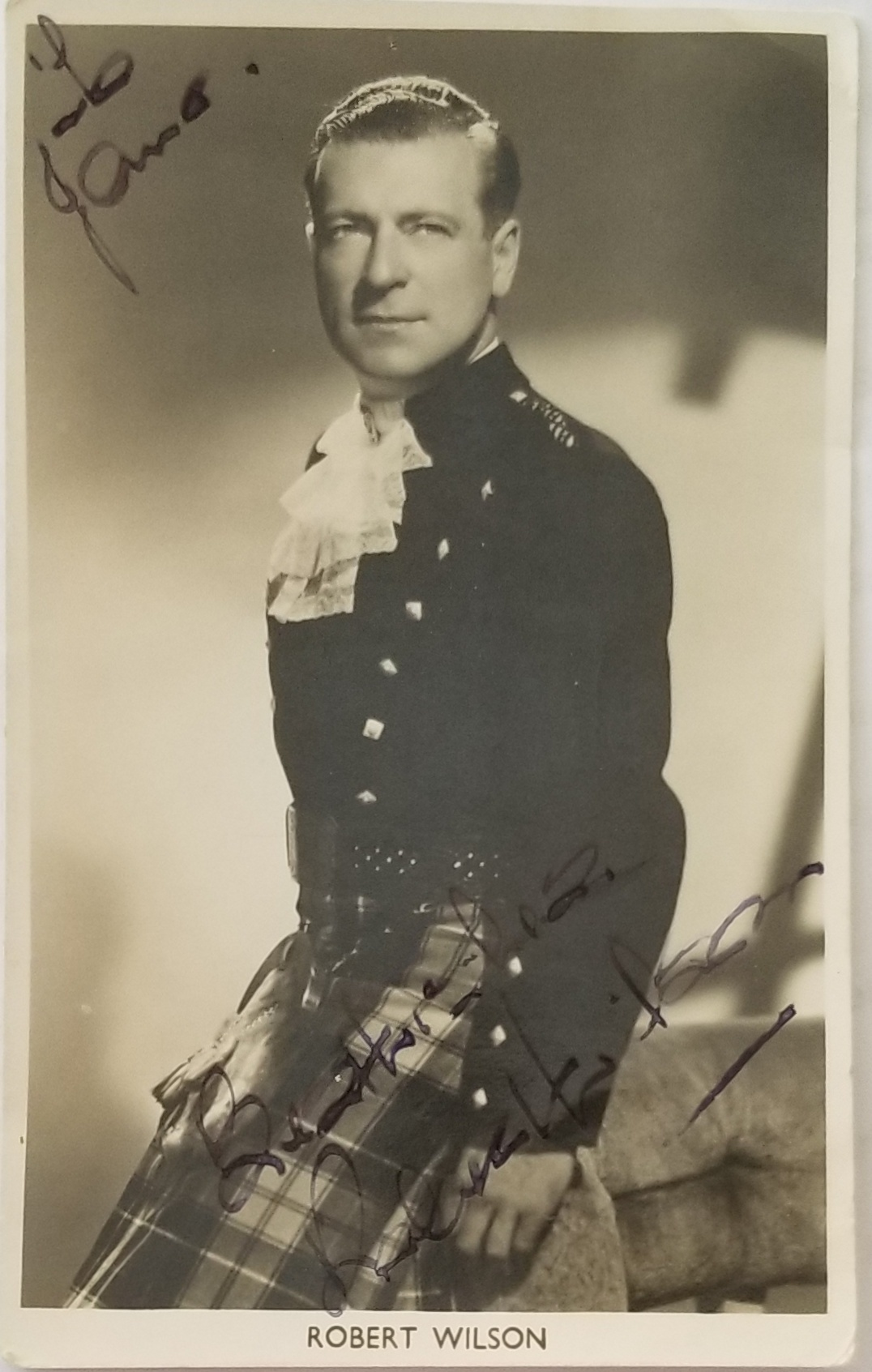
Signed photo of Robert Wilson

Robert Wilson (2 January 1907 – 25 September 1964) was a Scottish tenor. After beginning his career with the Rothesay Entertainers in Scotland, Wilson joined the D'Oyly Carte Opera Company, with whom he performed from 1931 to 1937, including several leading roles, while also beginning his recording career. He then began a long solo career in concerts, radio, variety and recording, becoming known especially for his performances of Scottish songs.

== Life and career ==
Wilson was born in Cambuslang. His father, Alexander, was a tailor, and his mother was Marion née McLurg. He began singing as a boy in the Newarthill United Free Church Choir, then joined the Clydesdale male voice choir. He trained at first as a draughtsman, then, in his twenties, as a professional singer in Glasgow. He initially performed for several seasons as part of the Rothesay Entertainers in Scotland. At the same time, he sang at Clan concerts and Scottish Festivals.

In 1931, Wilson joined the D'Oyly Carte Opera Company, at first in the chorus, understudying and occasionally performing the role of the Defendant in Trial by Jury and Ralph Rackstraw in H.M.S. Pinafore. In 1932, he began to play the Defendant on a regular basis, and soon was also playing the small roles of First Yeoman in The Yeomen of the Guard and Francesco in The Gondoliers, and still substituting occasionally as Ralph. At the same time, he was in demand as a recording artist for Parlophone. In 1934, he was given the additional principal roles of Hilarion in Princess Ida and Nanki-Poo in The Mikado and moved up to Leonard Meryll in Yeomen and Marco in The Gondoliers. In 1935–36 season, he continued to play the Defendant and shared the roles of Ralph, Nanki Poo, Leonard and Frederic in The Pirates of Penzance, and he sometimes played Colonel Fairfax in Yeomen and Marco in The Gondoliers. He participated in the company's North American tours in 1934 and 1936. When Derek Oldham returned to the company in 1936, Wilson's roles were reduced to Defendant, Leonard and Francesco. He left the company in 1937.

After this, Wilson became a solo artist, heading his own concert party singing Scottish ballads for several years on tour throughout Britain. He also continued in demand as a recording artist, signing with His Master's Voice in 1943. His recordings of such Scottish songs as "A Gordon for Me" and "Down in the Glen" were big sellers. He became a well-known variety performer and in the 1950s he was an early presenter of the White Heather Club and recorded with them. He continued to tour into the 1960s. Wilson's wife was named Margaret (née MacDonald), and they had two sons, Iain (died 1973) and Carey, a performer with Citizens Theatre in Glasgow.

Wilson died in 1964, never having fully recovered from a car accident the previous year.

== Sources ==
- Ayre, Leslie (1972). The Gilbert & Sullivan Companion. London: W.H. Allen & Co Ltd.
- Irving, Gordon (1977). The Good Auld Days – The story of Scotland's Entertainers from Music Hall to television. London: Jupiter Books. ISBN 0904041-72-7.
