= Ronnie Browne =

Background information
- Born: Ronald Grant Browne; 20 August 1937 (age 88); Edinburgh, Scotland
- Genres: Scottish folk
- Occupations: Musician, songwriter, portrait artist
- Instruments: Guitar, mandolin, bodhrán, harmonica, tin whistle, banjo, kazoo
- Years active: 1960s–2002, 2007–2015
- Label: Scotdisc
- Website: corries.com

Ronald Grant Browne (born 20 August 1937), known as The Voice, is a Scottish musician and songwriter who was a founding member of The Corries.

== Biography ==
Browne was born in Edinburgh to John Albert 'Bertie' Browne, a truck driver, and Anne 'Nancy' Browne. He was raised in Scotland. Aside from singing, Browne's other abilities are painting, sketching and rugby, having once played as a winger for his secondary school Boroughmuir. He met Roy Williamson on the rugby field, as Williamson had played as a winger for Boroughmuir's rivals Edinburgh Wanderers.

This led to meeting multi-instrumentalist Bill Smith at Edinburgh College of Art in 1955 and the formation of the Corrie Folk Trio in 1962. The group was expanded the following year with the addition of female singer Paddie Bell. Shortly after releasing three albums in 1965, Bell left to begin a solo career. With the departure of Smith, the following year, Browne and Williamson continued to perform as a duo now known as The Corries.

In 1970, Williamson conceived and built the band's signature instrument: the combolins, a pair of instruments that were rarely played separately. Williamson's instrument featured a basic guitar fingerboard with a bandurria attached and sympathetic resonating strings. Browne's model was a basic guitar with a mandolin attached and four bass strings.

Browne and Williamson were regular performers on Scottish television shows and movies and in 1983 received an International Film and Television Festival gold award for their Scottish Television series, "The Corries & Other Folk". The 1996 film The Bruce features Browne's rendition of the Williamson-penned Flower of Scotland at the end. Browne appeared in the film playing the role of Maxwell The Minstrel.

Since Williamson's death in 1990, Browne continued to perform and record in the spirit of the Corries. He regularly led the singing of Flower of Scotland, de facto national anthem of Scotland, for the Scotland national rugby and football teams. During his performances, he was known to yell "COME ON!" to the audience during the opening line of the song he was singing and this has often been parodied by the BBC Hogmanay sketch show Only an Excuse?. As of 27 April 2015, Browne announced that due to emotional breakdowns during performances, he has put an end to singing in public.

Browne is now an accomplished portrait artist.

== Personal life ==
Browne met and fell in love with Patricia Elliott during secondary school, and the two married on 30 June 1959. Together they had three children.

Gavin Browne is the eldest, and has run The Corries Official Website since 1997.

Ronnie and Pat were married for 53 years until Pat died from cancer in 2012.

== Filmography ==
- The Bruce (1996)
