= The Braes o' Killiecrankie =

Scottish traditional song

Braes o' Killiecrankie is the name of four distinct folk songs, all originally from Scotland.

The version that begins with the line "Whare hae ye been sae braw, lad?" (Roud 8187) is the one discussed here. The versions that begin with the line "Clavers and his highland men" are either the Scots version (Roud 8188) or the USA version (Roud 2572). Finally there is another Scots version, that begins with the line "On a thistle I sat doon" (Roud 3363).

The Battle of Killiecrankie was fought in 1689, as part of the Jacobite rebellion. James Hogg made a collection of songs relating to the battles and campaigns. It was published as Jacobite Relics in 1819. He lists this song simply as "Killiecrankie" (number 19 on page 32).

The first three verses and the chorus were written by Robert Burns and set to an older melody. Hogg may have had a hand in writing the additional verses.

== Lyrics ==
James Hogg version
Whare hae ye been sae braw, lad?
Whare hae ye been sae brankie, O?
Whare hae ye been sae braw, lad?
Came ye by Killicrankie, O?

Chorus
An ye had been whare I hae been,
Ye wadna been sae cantie, O;
An ye had seen what I hae seen,
I' the braes o' Killicrankie, O.

I faught at land, I faught at sea,
At hame I faught my auntie, O;
But I met the devil and Dundee
On the braes o' Killicrankie, O.

(Chorus)

The bauld Pitcur fell in a furr,
And Clavers got a clankie, O,
Or I had fed an Athol gled
On the braes o' Killicrankie, O.

(Chorus)

O fie, Mackay, what gart ye lie
I' the bush ayont the brankie, O?
Ye'd better kiss'd King Willie's loof,
Than come to Killicrankie, O.

It's nae shame, it's nae shame,
It's nae shame to shank ye, O;
There's sour slaes on Athol braes,
And deils at Killicrankie, O.

== Notable recordings ==
- Scotland's Big Country recorded a version with rousing guitar.
- A 1966 recording by The Corries was a pioneering use of the music video.
- Recorded by Jean Redpath on The Songs of Robert Burns, volumes 5 and 6
- Marc Gunn recorded it on his first solo album in 2004, Soul of a Harper.
- Recorded by Jim Malcolm (formerly of the Old Blind Dogs) on Acquaintance.
- Scottish group Broadsword, consisting of Ian Jaconelli and Paul Kelly, included it on their self-titled album.
- The McCalmans on The Scottish Songs album.
- Recorded by Scottish folk singer Bob Stewart on the Rooted in Folk album.
- Recorded by The Jacobites by Name on their 2016 self titled debut album.
- Recorded by Scottish-American folk singer Alex Beaton on his album "20 Hits of Scotland"(1990).
