= Stanley Robertson (folk singer) =

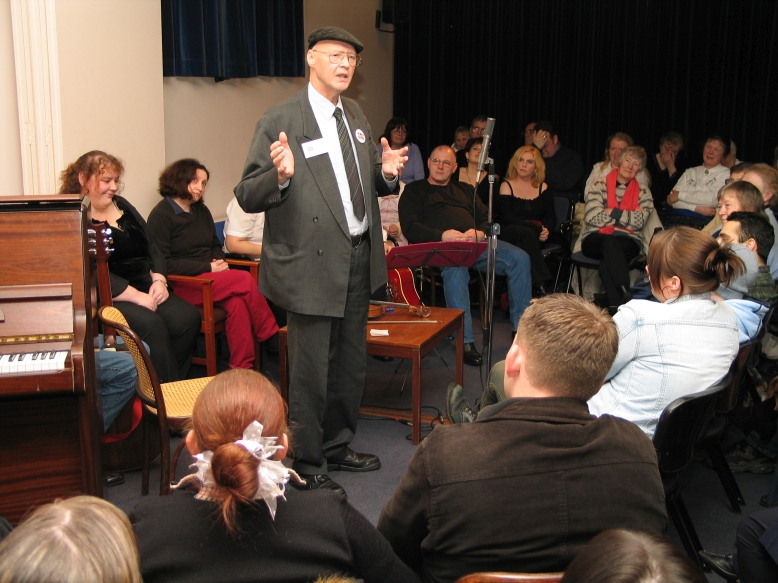
- Stanley Robertson telling a story at the Barrie Nicht in Aberdeen Arts Centre, 26 January 2004
- Born: William Stanley Robertson; 8 June 1940; Aberdeen, Scotland
- Died: 2 August 2009 (aged 69); Aberdeen, Scotland
- Resting place: Old Lumphanan Kirkyard, Aberdeenshire
- Occupations: Singer, songwriter, storyteller
- Years active: 1950s–2009
- Spouse: Johnanne Robertson
- Children: Anthony, Clifford, Dale, Gabrielle, Nicole and Robert

Stanley Robertson (8 June 1940 – 2 August 2009) was a Scottish storyteller, author, ballad singer, and piper.

He was born in Aberdeen in 1940 into a Romani family which had settled there. He worked for thirty-nine years as a fish filleter in the city. From his aunt, folk singer Jeannie Robertson, and others including his father, he inherited a huge repertoire of northeast ballads. He was the keyworker for the Heritage Lottery-funded "Oral and Cultural Traditions of Scottish Travellers" project at the Elphinstone Institute, University of Aberdeen, from April 2002 until April 2005.

As a member of the Romani community, Robertson documented the group's lore and that of his own, and promoted the cultural traditions of Scottish Romani among young people in schools and community groups. His storytelling was affected by the different trades at which he worked, including his long years spent filleting in the Aberdeen fish houses, where he gathered many contemporary stories.

In June 2003, he represented the University of Aberdeen and Scotland at the Smithsonian Institution's Folklife Festival in Washington, D.C.

He published three plays and seven books, some written in his local Scots dialect. He was featured in more than 100 radio programmes and 50 television appearances and made numerous personal appearances on stage and in theatres, schools and colleges.

On 27 November 2008, at age 68, Robertson, who was an Honorary Research Associate at the University of Aberdeen's Elphinstone Institute, was conferred an honorary degree of Master of the university (MUniv), in recognition for the work he had done.

He was a frequent broadcaster and appeared regularly at storytelling festivals. He was an Honorary Founder of the Scottish Storytelling Forum. Stanley died at his home in Aberdeen on Sunday, 2 August 2009.

A musical about Robertson's life by Kyle Jarrow and Bright Lights, Big City composer Paul Scott Goodman tentatively titled Reek Roon is currently under development, reportedly commissioned by Fela! producer Steve Hendel.

In 2016, in memory of Robertson's significant influence as a storyteller, the Grampian Association of Storytellers commissioned the 'Stanley Robertson Award for Traditional Storytelling' to be given out at the Aberdeen Traditional Music and Song Association's yearly competitions. The trophy was created by glassmaker Shelagh Swanson and its first winner was Jane Chalmers.

== Works ==
=== Books ===
- Exodus to Alford. Balnain Books, Nairn, Scotland, 1988. ISBN 978-0-9509792-6-7 (online)
- Nyakim's Windows. Balnain, Nairn, Scotland, Edinburgh, 1989. ISBN 978-0-9509792-7-4
- Fish-Hooses 1. Balnain, Nairn, 1990. ISBN 978-1-872557-01-4, 0-87255-701-5 (online)
- Fish-Hooses 2. Balnain, Nairn, 1991. ISBN 978-1-872557-12-0 (online)
- The Land of No Death. Balnain, Nairn, Scotland, 1993. ISBN 978-1-872557-26-7 (online)
- Ghosties and Ghoulies. Balnain, Nairn, 1994. ISBN 978-1-872557-35-9 (online)
- Reek Roon a Camp Fire. Birlinn, Edinburgh, 2009. ISBN 978-1-84158-795-0

=== Music and Audiobooks ===
- Nippit fit, clippit fit :traditional songs, stories and ballads. Aberdeen City Arts Libraries, 1990.
- A Keeper of the Lore. for the North East Folklore Archive in Scotland, 1991.
- Sangs and ferlies : traditional songs and stories. Stanley Robertson, Hamish Henderson, Birlers, Glasgow, 1992.
- Travellers' tales : Songs, stories and ballads from Scottish travelers. (Stanley Robertson, Duncan Williamson, William Williamson, Gabrielle Ijdo), Kyloe Records, Spittal, Berwick-upon-Tweed, 2002 (2 disks).
- Rum scum scoosh! : songs and stories of an Aberdeen childhood. Elphinstone Institute 2006 (2 discs).
