= Flower of Scotland =

Scottish national anthem (unofficial)

- Unofficial national anthem of Scotland
- Also known as: Flùr na h-Albann; Flouer o Scotland
- Lyrics: Roy Williamson, 1966–1967
- Music: Roy Williamson, 1966–1967
- Published: 1967

Audio sample
- Instrumental performance by the Royal Scots Dragoon Guards: file; help

"Flower of Scotland" is a Scottish patriotic song commonly used as an unofficial national anthem of Scotland. Written in the mid-1960s by the folk musician Roy Williamson, its lyrics describe the victory of Robert the Bruce, King of Scots, over Edward II, King of England, at the Battle of Bannockburn in 1314. Owing to its historical basis in the Wars of Scottish Independence, it urges contemporary Scots to rise again as a nation and remember the day their ancestors deterred Edward's English invaders.

Notable for its association with supporters of the Scottish national football team and Scottish national rugby union team, "Flower of Scotland" is one of the most popular sporting anthems in Europe.

== Background ==
It was composed in the mid-1960s by Roy Williamson of the folk group the Corries. It was first heard publicly in a BBC television series in 1967, where it did not yet include the third 'we can still rise now' verse. The words refer to the victory of the Kingdom of Scotland, led by Robert I, over Edward II of the Kingdom of England at the Battle of Bannockburn in 1314. Although there is no official national anthem of Scotland, "Flower of Scotland" is one of a number of songs which are used, along with the older "Scotland the Brave".

The song was composed and is sung in English, with one Scots-language word ("Tae" for "To"). It has been translated into Scots and Scottish Gaelic.

== Popular use ==
=== Sporting events ===
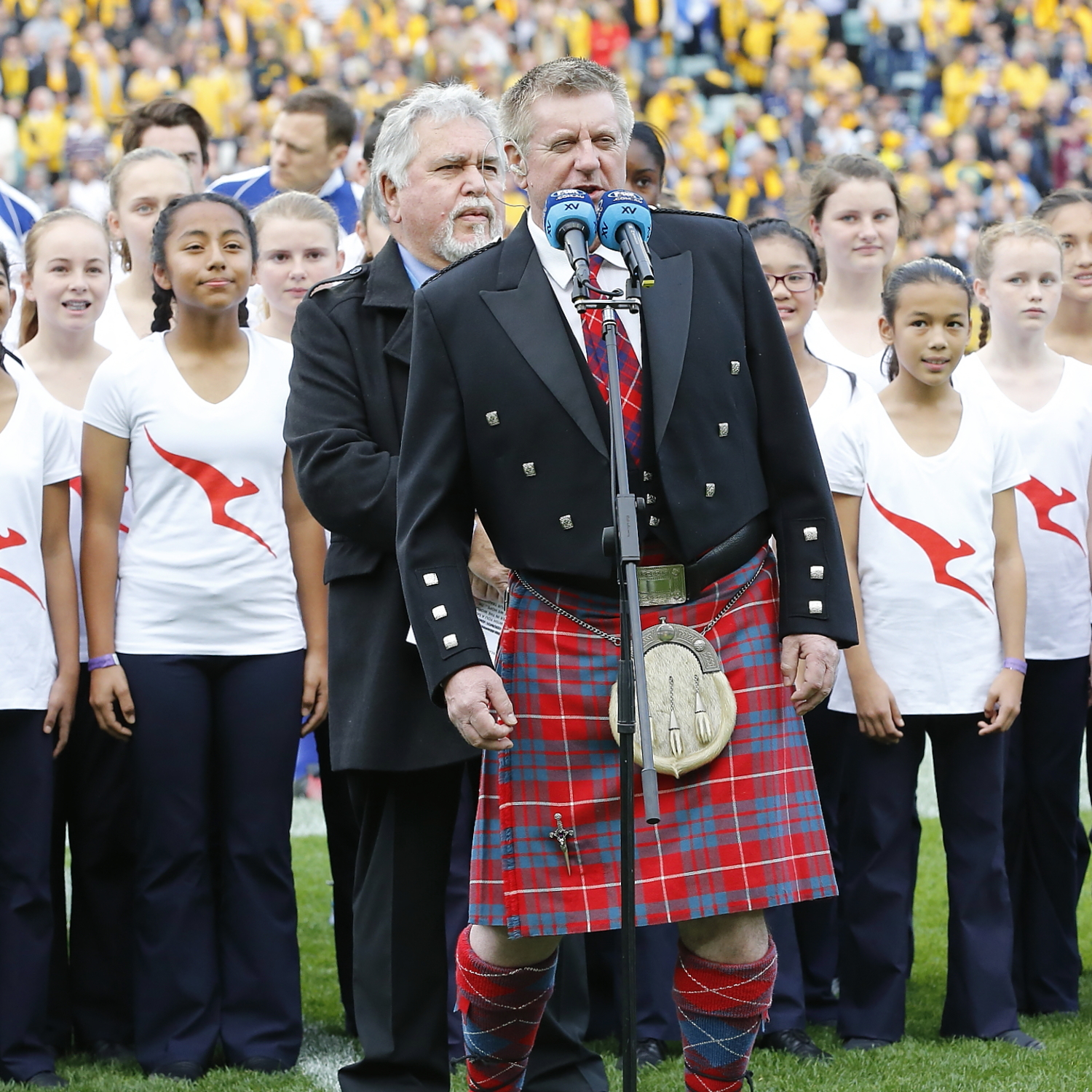
Flower of Scotland being performed and played prior to the 2017 mid-year rugby union international Australia v Scotland

The song has been used as an anthem by the Scotland rugby union team, ever since the winger, Billy Steele, encouraged his team-mates to sing it on the British & Irish Lions tour of South Africa in 1974. The song was adopted as the pre-game anthem for the 1990 Five Nations Championship, first non-officially for the initial home game against France, then for the deciding match between Scotland and England at Murrayfield, which Scotland won 13–7 to win the Grand Slam.

The Scottish Football Association adopted "Flower of Scotland" as its pre-game national anthem in 1997 although it was first used by them in 1993.

=== Commonwealth Games ===
The song was used as the victory anthem of Team Scotland at the Commonwealth Games in 2010, replacing "Scotland the Brave". This trend continued to the Commonwealth Games in 2014 where it was again Team Scotland's anthem and was sung following a Scottish gold medal. It was sung four times when Team Scotland won four gold medals on the first day of competition.

=== Olympics ===
At the 2012 Summer Olympics opening ceremony, the song was sung at Edinburgh Castle by 53 Scottish children selected from schools across Scotland.

== Official anthem ==
In July 2006 the Royal Scottish National Orchestra conducted an online poll (publicised by Reporting Scotland) in which voters could choose a national anthem from one of five candidates. There were 10,000 respondents, and "Flower of Scotland" won with 41 per cent of the votes.

On 13 January 2015 the Scottish Parliament heard evidence from a member of the public, Chris Cromar, who had brought forward a petition for consideration on an agreed national anthem for Scotland. Cromar had, through the petition, called for the Scottish Government to formally recognise and adopt "Flower of Scotland" as the Scottish national anthem.

The Scottish Football Association (SFA) responded to a written request from the Scottish Parliament regarding the petition, whereby they stated that they believed the matter of agreeing a national anthem for Scotland would be "more appropriate for the 35,000 members of the Scotland Supporter's Club members". The SFA conducted a poll amongst its members and audiences on its social media platforms, with "Flower of Scotland" achieving a narrow victory. Despite this, the SFA alluded to the matter that the narrowing victory suggested "some food for thought" over what the national anthem should be, with "Scotland the Brave" retaining an affinity amongst Scotland's football supporters.

On 17 March 2015 the Scottish Parliament officially closed the consideration of the petition under Rule 15.7, claiming that "this is not something that should be led by the Scottish Government but is likely to be determined informally over time". Angus MacDonald said in a speech to the Scottish Parliament about the petition that "given the position of the Scottish Government, and given that there is still a considerable amount of debate outside as to what the national anthem should be, we should close the petition reluctantly and allow that debate to continue".

== Other uses ==
Paris Saint-Germain fans sing the chant "Ô Ville Lumière" ("O City of Light") to the tune of "Flower of Scotland". The song was featured on the 1983 album A Sense of Freedom by the Wolfe Tones.
