= Paddie Bell =

- Born: Patricia Margaret Simpson; 8 April 1931; Belfast, Northern Ireland
- Origin: Edinburgh, Scotland
- Died: 3 August 2005 (aged 74) Edinburgh, Scotland
- Genres: Folk music
- Occupations: Singer, musician
- Formerly of: The Corries

Patricia Margaret Bell (née Simpson, 8 April 1931 – 3 August 2005) professionally known as Paddie Bell, was a Scottish folk singer and musician, born in Northern Ireland.

== Biography ==
Bell was born as Patricia Margaret Simpson, in Belfast, Northern Ireland, but was a resident of Edinburgh, Scotland for most of her life. She sang with The Corrie Folk Trio from 1962 to 1965. The band later became The Corries after she left because she wanted to perform different songs from the ones the Trio sang. She pursued a solo career after this, releasing an album called Herself.

She returned to the Scottish folk scene in the 1990s, recorded two CDs, was a regular at Edinburgh Folk Club and had her own celebrated show in the Edinburgh Festival, as well as appearing at Festival Folk at the Oak.

She married architect Sandy Bell of Blairgowrie in 1957 and had a daughter in 1966.

== Solo albums ==
- 1965 – Herself (with Martin Carthy)
- 1968 – I Know Where I'm Going (with Finbar and Eddie Furey)
- 1993 – The Dawn of a Brand New Day
- 1997 – Make me Want to Stay
- 1998 – An Irish Kiss (with Sean Pugh)
