= James Madison Carpenter =

American folklorist and minister (1888–1983)

- Born: 17 October 1888; Blacklands, Mississippi
- Died: 4 July 1983 (aged 94); Booneville, Mississippi
- Occupations: Methodist minister, folklorist
- Parent(s): James Carpenter & Sarah Bartlett

James Madison Carpenter, born in 1888 in Blacklands, Mississippi, near Booneville, in Prentiss County, was a Methodist minister and scholar of American and British folklore. He received his Bachelor of Arts and Master of Arts degrees from the University of Mississippi, and the Doctor of Philosophy degree from Harvard in 1929. He is best known for his substantial work collecting folk songs in England, Scotland and Wales. He recorded well-known singers and musicians that other folklorists had documented, as well as some never recorded before or since such as Bell Duncan, whose repertoire (according to Carpenter) consisted of some 300 songs, including 65 Child ballads. His collection methods included Dictaphone recordings as well as transcriptions of lyrics.

Carpenter's method of collecting songs often involved recording several verses using the Dictaphone cylinder machine, then asking the singer to start again and dictate the words of the song, two lines at a time, while he typed them up on a portable typewriter.

Carpenter returned to Harvard in 1935 where he gave occasional lectures and worked on transcribing the tunes of the ballads he had collected, intending to put the material into publishable form. From 1938 to 1943 he taught part-time at Duke University in the English Department. In 1943 he took another post in Virginia and finally moved to the English Department at Greensboro College, North Carolina, where he stayed until his retirement in 1954. He returned to Booneville in 1964 and remained there until his death in 1983.

In the end, only a handful of items from his collection were ever published. His extensive material eventually found a home at the American Folklife Center at the Library of Congress where it has been made accessible (and searchable). It is considered "a major collection of traditional song and drama, plus some items of traditional instrumental music, dance, custom, narrative and children's folklore, from England, Scotland, Wales, Ireland and the US, documented in the period 1927-55." In 2003, the James Madison Carpenter Collection Online Catalogue, the University of Sheffield, and the American Folklife Center, Library of Congress, were jointly awarded the Brenda McCallum Prize of the American Folklore Society for their work on the Carpenter Collection. In 2018, the fully digitised James Madison Carpenter Collection was made available online on the Vaughan Williams Memorial Library’s digital archive.

For a more extensive biography see "'Dr Carpenter from the Harvard College in America': An Introduction to James Madison Carpenter and his Collection" by Julia C. Bishop, Folk Music Journal, 7/4, 1998, pp. 402–420. This is the first article in a special issue of the Journal devoted to Carpenter and his collection.
