= Roy Williamson =

Scottish songwriter and folk musician (1936–1990)

Background information
- Born: Roy Murdoch Buchanan Williamson; 25 June 1936; Edinburgh, Scotland
- Died: 12 August 1990 (aged 54) Forres, Moray, Scotland
- Genres: Scottish folk
- Occupations: Musician, songwriter
- Instruments: Guitar, mandolin, bodhrán, combolin, English concertina, Northumbrian pipes, whistle,
- Years active: 1960s–1989
- Label: Scotdisc
- Formerly of: The Corries, The Corries Folk Trio
- Website: corries.com

Roy Murdoch Buchanan Williamson (25 June 1936 – 12 August 1990) was a Scottish songwriter and folk musician, most notably with The Corries. Williamson is best known for writing "Flower of Scotland", which has become the de facto national anthem of Scotland used at international sporting events.

== Early life ==
Roy Williamson's father, Archibald Moir Macrae Williamson, was an advocate (a barrister); his mother, Agnes Ethel Cumming Buchanan Williamson, was a talented pianist who frequently took her two sons, Robert and Roy, to musical events. As a schoolboy, Williamson learned to play the recorder by ear, pretending to read music. A teacher found out and banned him from music lessons. He went to Wester Elchies School, then Aberlour House and Gordonstoun in Moray. He taught seamanship and navigation at Burghead before going to Edinburgh College of Art. It was there in 1955 that he met Ronnie Browne, with whom he would team up in The Corries. The partnership lasted almost thirty years. Williamson and Browne also shared a passion for rugby, having played wing against each other for Edinburgh Wanderers and Boroughmuir, respectively.

Williamson's father committed suicide when his son was eight years old. Williamson had a brother, Robert Buchanan Williamson.

== Musical career ==
=== The Corries ===
Williamson joined Bill Smith and Ron Cruikshank to form the "Corrie Folk Trio" in 1962. The Trio's first performance was in the Waverley Bar on St Mary's Street, Edinburgh. After a few weeks Ron Cruikshank left because he had contracted glandular fever. The Trio had already accepted an engagement at the Edinburgh Festival, so Williamson suggested that Ronnie Browne should be asked to join the group in order that it would have three members again. At a later date, the group added female Northern Irish singer Paddie Bell to become the "Corrie Folk Trio and Paddie Bell". The audience was only eight people for the debut of the Trio, but by the end of the festival it was a full house at every performance.

By 1966, Paddie Bell and Bill Smith had left, with Bell saying that she wanted to perform songs that were different from the ones the Trio sang and Smith having fallen out with Browne (Smith cites that he himself was a perfectionist). These developments left Williamson and Browne to continue the group. Williamson was a singer who was also a gifted multi-instrumentalist; Browne, by contrast, was a gifted singer who had learned to play various musical instruments. The two men cancelled all engagements for a few months to practise intensively. Under a new name, "The Corries", they performed at the Jubilee Arms Hotel in Cortachy, Angus. The enthusiastic response encouraged them to continue as a duo, and they became highly successful in Scotland and eventually throughout much of the world.

=== "Flower of Scotland" ===
Williamson wrote Flower of Scotland during the 1960s; it is currently the most popular candidate for a Scottish national anthem. The song now represents Scotland at international rugby and international football matches, and at the Commonwealth Games. It was sung in the 2007 Commonwealth Games by Ronnie Browne, though he swore never to sing it again, saying that it was a struggle not to be overcome with emotion.

=== Combolin ===
Williamson, whose many talents ranged from art to woodworking, co-designed a boat named The Sheena Margaret, which was named for his younger daughter with his first wife, Violet. In summer 1969 he invented the 'combolins', two complementary instruments that combined several instruments into a single one. Browne's instrument contained a mandolin with a guitar (along with four bass strings operated with slides); Williamson's had a guitar as well as the 12-string Spanish bandurria, the latter being an instrument he had played since the early days of the Corrie Folk Trio.

Originally conceived as a way to combine several of the many instruments they carried around on tour – the Corries' long row of chairs behind them on stage bearing instruments is legendary – the combolins in fact became an additional two instruments for the tour van. Most often, Browne played the guitar/mandolin instrument with bass strings, and Williamson the other, which also had 13 sympathetic strings designed to resonate like the Indian sitar.

The wood for the combolins was obtained from antique hardwood furniture as well as premium grade Tyrolean spruce, and displayed Williamson's artistic embellishments in silver and mother of pearl. The Corries' album, Strings and Things (1970), was specifically designed to display the new instruments: It featured detailed descriptions of them on the rear sleeve.

Williamson had advertised the combolins a year prior to completing them and had first tested them only a short while before a concert but found that they sounded terrible. He had to quickly rebuild them and learn to play them with Browne before the concert day.

When the combolins were played, Browne and Williamson often switched places from left to right respectively to right and left.

== Personal life ==
Wiliamson had two daughters, Karen and Sheena, and was married twice — first to Violet Thomson and then to Nicolette van Hurck, from The Netherlands.

As a young man, he had played rugby for Edinburgh Wanderers, the rivals of Boroughmuir, the team for which Browne had played. Williamson suffered throughout his life from asthma; he usually discontinued his asthma treatments before a show or a concert. He continued performing until late in 1989, when his final illness became apparent.

== Death ==
Williamson died of a brain tumour on 12 August 1990.
