= The Corries =

Scottish folk group

- Also known as: The Corrie Folk Trio; The Corrie Folk Trio & Paddie Bell
- Origin: Edinburgh, Scotland
- Genre: Scottish folk
- Years active: 1962–1990
- Past members: Roy Williamson (deceased); Bill Smith (deceased); Paddie Bell (deceased); Ronnie Browne
- Website: corries.com

The Corries were a Scottish folk group that emerged from the Scottish folk revival of the early 1960s. The group was a trio from their formation until 1966 when founder Bill Smith left the band, but Roy Williamson and Ronnie Browne continued as a duo until Williamson's death in 1990.

They are particularly known for the song "Flower of Scotland", written by Williamson, which has become an unofficial national anthem of Scotland.

== History ==
=== Early years ===
In the early 1960s, Bill Smith (born in 1936 in Edinburgh - died March 1, 2025), Ron Cruikshank and Andy Turner had formed a trio called The Corrie Voices. The trio was named after Smith's daughter, Corrie Smith, but because a corrie is a deep bowl in a mountain, the name was particularly appropriate as it evokes imagery of the Scottish landscape. After Turner dropped out in 1962, Roy Williamson teamed up with Smith and Cruikshank to form the Corrie Folk Trio. Their first performance was in the Waverley Bar in St Mary's Street, Edinburgh. After a few weeks, Cruikshank left due to illness. They had already accepted an engagement at the Edinburgh Festival so Williamson suggested that Ronnie Browne should be brought in to make up the numbers.

The band added female Irish singer Paddie Bell to become the Corrie Folk Trio and Paddie Bell. The audience was only eight people for the debut of this line-up but by the end of the festival there was a full house at every performance.

=== Television ===
Within a year of formation, they appeared on television. The BBC began a television series set in a folk club. The resident group on the Hoot'nanny Show was the Corrie Folk Trio. Another BBC series, The White Heather Club, began in 1958. It featured Andy Stewart, Jimmy Shand and his Band, Robin Hall and Jimmie Macgregor, and the Corries. While the rest of the show was set in a studio, the Corries were filmed in location: sea songs were sung in a harbour, and "The Braes o' Killiecrankie" was sung at the Pass of Killiecrankie.

=== As The Corries ===
In 1965, Paddie Bell departed, followed by Bill Smith in 1966. In the duo left behind, Williamson was a multi-instrumentalist while Browne handled lead vocals. They cancelled all engagements for a few months to practise intensely and, emerging under the new name, The Corries, they performed at the Jubilee Arms Hotel in Cortachy, Angus.

=== 1970s ===
In 1969, "Flower of Scotland" featured on the Fontana release, "The Corries in Concert". The song was quickly adopted by world lightweight boxing champion Ken Buchanan, whose fans sang it on his entering the ring. It was then taken up by supporters of rugby union as the unofficial national anthem and is still used at Scotland's rugby internationals. "Flower of Scotland" has since been adopted as the national anthem at international football matches. 1974 saw the first release of a series of Live from Scotland albums on their own Pan-Audio / DARA label, all featuring live recordings from the group's famed tours of concert halls around Scotland, extending to a total of four volumes. The Flower of Scotland live performance from Live from Scotland Volume 1 was released as a single backed by Browne's song, "Roses of Prince Charlie", in several versions including one with special cover artwork for the 1974 FIFA World Cup campaign. The 1977 album, Peat Fire Flame, saw the group return to the studio album format, with a move towards love songs and celebrations of the landscape. By the 1980s however, the group would return to live albums for the rest of their recording career.

=== 1980–present ===
Roy Williamson suffered from asthma and before a series of concerts he would deliberately cease treatment to provoke attacks and gain temporary immunity. During the Corries' 1989 tour, Williamson's health went into decline and he was diagnosed with a brain tumour. He spent his last years living in Forres, close to where he spent his school years. He died on 12 August 1990.

Ronnie Browne continued recording and moved into acting, as well as expanding his painting career. He toured as a soloist for a few years after Williamson's death, and even released a solo album, but never reached the same level of success that he achieved as part of the duo. He has now retired from performing, but occasionally sings "Flower of Scotland" along with the crowd at Scottish rugby or shinty matches.

Paddie Bell continued to make solo albums following her departure from the trio, most notably with Irish musicians Finbar and Eddie Furey, but withdrew from the folk scene followed by a period of dependency on alcohol and anti-depressant medication. In the 1990s, Bell, with the help of several friends and fans on the folk scene in Edinburgh, revived her singing career with new recordings and became something of a celebrity again. She died in 2005, aged 74.

In December 2007, The Corries were inducted into the Scottish Traditional Music Hall of Fame at the Scottish Trad Music Awards in Fort William, promoted by concertina virtuoso Simon Thoumire's Hands Up for Trad organisation.

Bill Smith died on March 1, 2025.

== The Combolins ==
In 1969, Williamson invented the "combolins", two complementary instruments that combined several into one single instrument. One combined a mandolin and a guitar (along with four bass strings operated with slides), the other combining guitar and the Spanish bandurria. The latter was an instrument Williamson had played since the early days of the Corrie Folk Trio.

Originally conceived as a way to combine several of the many instruments they carried around on tour the combolins in fact became an additional two instruments for the tour van. Most often, Browne played the guitar/mandolin instrument with bass strings, and Williamson the other, which also had 13 sympathetic strings designed to resonate like the Indian sitar. The wood for the instruments was obtained from antique hardwood furniture as well as premium grade Tyrolean spruce, and featured Williamson's embellishments in silver and mother of pearl.

The Corries' album, Strings and Things (1970), was specifically designed to showcase these instruments and featured detailed descriptions of them on the rear sleeve. Usually the combolins were played to accompany long ballads such as "The Silkie of Sule Skerry" and "The Gartan Mother's Lullaby", as well as a number of the compositions of Peebles baker George Weir, including "Lord Yester" and "Weep ye Weel by Atholl".

== Legacy ==
Gotye cites The Corries as the inspiration behind his music.

The Scottish Traditional Hall of Music describes the Corries as “the godfathers of the modern folk-music scene in Scotland.”

== Discography ==
Year	Album	Chart Position
Year	Album	UK Albums Chart
1964	The Corrie Folk Trio and Paddie Bell	–
1965	The Promise of the Day	–
1966	Those Wild Corries	–
1967	Bonnet, Belt and Sword	–
1968	Kishmul's Galley	–
1969	Scottish Love Songs: Released 9 May 1970; Label/Cat. No.: Fontana (6306 004)	46
1969	The Corries In Concert: Label/Cat No.: Fontana (STL5484)	–
1970	Strings and Things	–
1970	In Retrospect	–
1972	Sound The Pibroch: Released: 16 September 1972; Label/Cat No.: Columbia (SCX 6511)	39
1973	A Little of What You Fancy	–
1974	Live from Scotland Volume 1	–
1975	Live from Scotland Volume 2	–
1975	Live from Scotland Volume 3	–
1976	Live At The Royal Lyceum Theatre, Edinburgh	–
1977	Live from Scotland Volume 4	–
1977	Peat Fire Flame	–
1977	Spotlight on the Corries	–
1980	Stovies	–
1982	The Dawning of the Day: Live	–
1983	Love From Scotland: Compilation	–
1985	Scotland Will Flourish: Live	–
1987	Barrett's Privateers: Live	–
1988	The Bonnie Blue: Live	–
1990	Flower of Scotland: Live	–

Many of The Corries recordings have now been re-issued on CD by Moidart Music, a company set up originally to release Williamson's posthumous Long Journey South solo album. The recordings are now overseen by Browne's son Gavin, who runs the official Corries website along with original recording engineer, Allan Spence, and David Sinton.
