= Scottish music (1900–1949) =

== Births and deaths ==
=== Births ===
- Jeannie Robertson (1908–1975)
- Jimmy Shand (1908–2000)
- Ewan MacColl (1915–1989)
- Jane Turriff (1915–2013)
- Roy Williamson (1936–1990)
- Hamish Imlach (1940–1996)
- John Martyn (1948)
- Dick Gaughan (1948)

== Collections of songs or music ==
- 1911 "Folk Song in the North-East" by Gavin Greig (1856–1914)
- 1930 "Bothy Songs and Ballads" by John Ord

== Recordings ==
- 1908 "The Music of Scott Skinner" by Scott Skinner (1843–1927)
