= George S. Morris (musician) =

Scottish Doric musician (1876–1958)

George Smith Morris, The Buchan Chiel, was born in Aberdeen in 1876 and died in 1958. He is best known as a singer and writer of Doric comic songs. His father was a farrier with his own business and in due time George too became a blacksmith. In 1912 he married Agnes Kemp, the sister of Willie Kemp, the King of the Cornkisters, and moved to Oldmeldrum in 1919 where the Kemp family ran a hotel business.

During his time in Oldmeldrum he started performing and writing. By 1930 he came to the attention of the Beltona record label and during the following decade he recorded more than 40 pieces, either bothy ballads or cornkisters, for them, some of which he composed himself or in collaboration with Willie Kemp.

His best-known composition, still popular in Northeast Scotland today, was A Pair o Nicky-tams but he wrote many others, the most notable of which were The Buchan Bobby, Aikey Brae and A New Lum Hat.

== Sources ==
- A Salute to Doric Heroes
