= Oceanography and Marine Biology: An Annual Review =

Oceanography and Marine Biology
- Discipline: Biology
- Language: English

Publication details
- History: 1963–present
- Publisher: Taylor & Francis

Standard abbreviations
- ISO 4: Oceanogr. Mar. Biol.

Indexing
- ISSN: 2154-9125

Links
- Series homepage

Oceanography and Marine Biology: An Annual Review is an annual review of oceanography and marine biology that has been published since 1963. It was originally edited by Harold Barnes. It was originally published by Aberdeen University Press and Allen & Unwin but is now published by CRC Press, part of Taylor & Francis. The 55th volume was published in 2017.
