= Bell Robertson =

Folk song collector

Bell Robertson (1841 – 1922) was a Scottish reciter of folk songs who contributed almost four hundred memorised ballads to the Greig-Duncan collection.

== Life ==
Bell was born Isabella Robertson on 1 February 1841 to crofter James Robertson and his wife Jean, née Gall, at Denhead of Boyndlie, Buchan, Aberdeenshire. She was their eldest child and had four younger brothers. She was educated by Janet Taylor, a spinner. She spent five years keeping house to her brothers in Glasgow before returning home to help her mother, and finally spent fourteen years as housekeeper to an invalid, Alexander Mackie, at Mill Aden and then at Aden House, Aberdeenshire.

Bell published original poetry in local periodicals and, in 1906, met another folk song collector, Philippa Russell, who helped her to publish "a small volume, called ‘Lays of Buchan’." Russell gave this description of her:

"In a small, two-roomed cottage at one of the lodges at Aden lived a one-armed, invalid man who had a very interesting maidservant called Isabella Robertson, who wrote beautiful poems and hymns. Her wages were only two pounds a year and her keep, but she was perfectly contented. She liked being of use. Her conversation was a mine of beautiful and original thoughts…[her published works] only give a faint idea of this self-taught genius. She was a perfect mine of local traditions, and many a tale she told me and my children of smugglers and pirates, and strange happenings in days gone by…"

== Folk songs ==
In her retirement in New Pitsligo, Bell met Gavin Greig and the Revd James Bruce Duncan, who were preparing a collection of local traditional music for publication. Bell Robertson was the most prolific single source for this through her correspondence with Greig, providing commentaries, notes, and text for almost four hundred songs. She had collected the songs throughout her life from her mother Jean, who was known locally as a singer; her aunt and grandmother; her teacher Janet Taylor and her fellow-pupils at Taylor’s school; and local people including travelling tinkers and a blacksmith.

Although she worked from memory, Bell’s literacy had an impact on the ballads she transmitted. Herself and her mother sometimes learned songs from chap-books, and her providing a written version contributed to crystallising the songs from their oral forms. Bell recited, and never sung, the ballads and she was regretted that she did not sing. Some scholars do note, however, that Scottish ballads were not songs and were treated more as poetry by that time.

Bell was committed to transmitting the ballads exactly as she had heard them, prioritising integrity over making sense of defective lines. Her approach was that "We want the ballads as they are, not as we think they ought to be."

Bell died in New Pitsligo on 19 August 1922.
