= Oldmeldrum Town Hall =

Municipal building in Oldmeldrum, Scotland

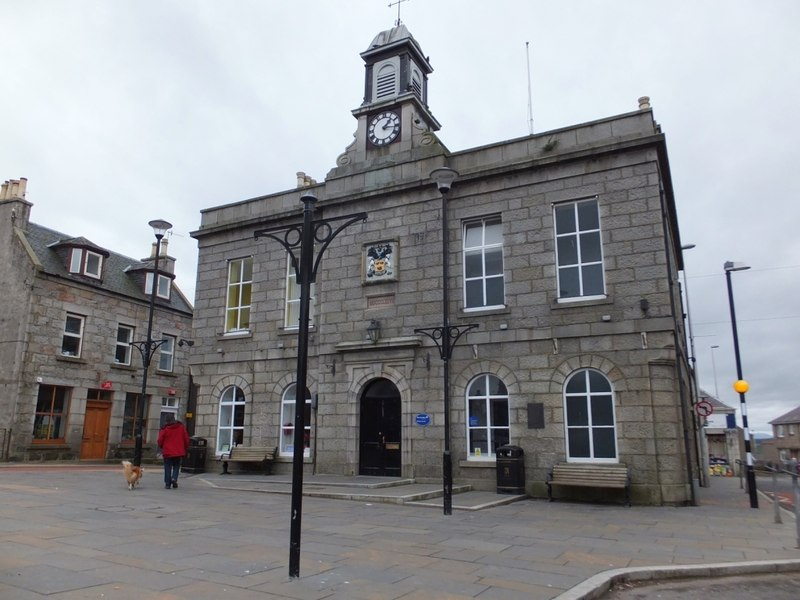
- Oldmeldrum Town Hall

- Shown in Aberdeenshire
- 57.3350°N 2.3199°W
- Location: Market Square, Oldmeldrum

History
- Built: 1877

Site notes
- Architect: William Smith
- Architectural style: Neoclassical style

Listed Building – Category B
- Official name: Town Hall, Market Square, Oldmeldrum
- Designated: 16 April 1971
- Reference no.: LB38892

Oldmeldrum Town Hall is a municipal structure in the Market Square, Oldmeldrum, Aberdeenshire, Scotland. The structure, which is used as a community events venue, is a Category B listed building.

== History ==
The first municipal building in Oldmeldrum was a town house in the Market Square which was commissioned by the local laird, William Urquhart, who was the 4th Urquhat of Meldrum and 17th Chief of the Clan Urquhart and whose seat was at Meldrum House. The town house featured a spire, which incorporated a clock and a bell, and was completed in the mid-18th century. By the 1870s, the old town hall had become dilapidated and the burgh leaders decided to rebuild it; the new structure was designed in the neoclassical style, built in granite and was completed in 1877.

The design involved a symmetrical main frontage with five bays facing onto the Market Square. The central bay, which slightly projected forward, featured a round headed doorway with voussoirs, a keystone, an entablature and a cornice and, on the first floor, a date stone and the coat of arms of William Urquhart which may have been recovered from the original town house. The outer bays were fenestrated by round headed casement windows with voussoirs on the ground floor and by square headed casement windows on the first floor. At roof level there was a parapet and a central clock tower flanked by scrolls and surmounted by a bell turret with an ogee-shaped dome and a weather vane. Internally, the principal room was the assembly hall on the first floor.

The building continued to serve as the meeting place of the burgh council for much of the 20th century, but ceased to be the local seat of government when the enlarged Gordon District Council was formed in 1975.

A plaque, intended to commemorate the lives of six locally born people, was installed on the front of the building by the former commander of the RAF Hospital in Cyprus, Air Marshal Sir John Donald, in 2006. The people commemorated on the plaque were the botanist, William Forsyth, the physician, Sir Patrick Manson, the mathematician, George Chrystal, the physician and botanist, Sir George Watt, the former Lord Provost of Aberdeen, Sir Thomas Mitchell, and the banker, Donald Gordon.

In 2007, a library which had been established in the building was closed and converted into a community café, and in 2011, a Community Interest Company known as "Making Meldrum Better" took over the management of the town hall. Since then the main role of the building has been that of a community events venue.

== See also ==
- List of listed buildings in Old Meldrum, Aberdeenshire
