= Cornkister =

A cornkister is a Doric song, generally a comic song, written during the late nineteenth or early twentieth centuries, in the tradition of the bothy ballads. The name refers to the cornkist (corn chest) used to measure oats sufficient to feed a plough horse on the farms of Northeast Scotland at that time. The reason for the association was that it was assumed that the singers—or one of the listeners—sat on top of the cornkist while singing and kicked their heels against it in time to the music. Nowadays most cornkisters are known via recordings made by entertainers of the 1920s and 1930s such as Willie Kemp, G. S. Morris or by later imitators such as Andy Stewart.

While there is some overlap with the bothy ballads, in that they both often have the topic of farm life in the Northeast of Scotland, and that singers of one will generally also sing the other, there is a difference in that the cornkister was more likely to be written for the music hall or for recording purposes, with the Beltona record label in particular recording many pieces.

The most famous cornkisters are:

- McGinty's Meal an Ale by George Bruce Thomson
- MacFarlane o the Sprotts o Burnieboosie by George Bruce Thomson
- A Pair o Nicky Tams by G. S. Morris

but many others exist.

== See also ==
- Bothy ballad
