= Bothy band =

Type of Scottish musical group

A bothy band is a musical group which comes from the farming culture of nineteenth century Scotland. At that time agriculture was relatively labour-intensive. As a result, large farms often had a small community associated with them, the farm toun. This was made up of married couples who lived in small cottages and single men who lived together in a bothy, or shelter. Generally, these bothies housed itinerant farm workers, such as potato diggers. In order to entertain themselves and the other members of the toun, the young men of the bothy would form bothy bands, and hold musical evenings, the bothy nichts, with the bothy bands providing music. A good band might well become known outside the toun, and be in demand for local events such as dances.

== See also ==
- Bothy ballads
- The Bothy Band
