= Hector MacDonald =

British soldier (1853–1903)

Major-General Sir Hector MacDonald KCB DSO
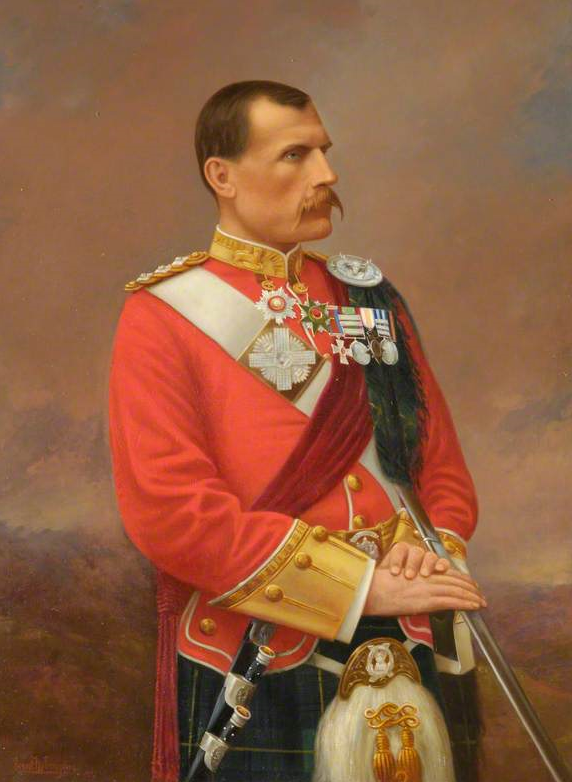
- Portrait by Ernest H. Longdon
- Born: 4 March 1853; Black Isle, Scotland
- Died: 25 March 1903 (aged 50); Paris, France
- Burial place: Dean Cemetery, Edinburgh
- Relatives: Ross MacDonald (Bathgate Boys Brigade)
- Military career
- Allegiance: United Kingdom
- Branch: British Army
- Service years: 1870–1903
- Rank: Major-General
- Nickname: Fighting Mac
- Commands: South District Army; Highland Brigade; Sirhind district
- Conflicts: Second Anglo-Afghan War; First Boer War; Mahdist War; Second Boer War
- Awards: Knight Commander of the Order of the Bath; Distinguished Service Order

Major-General Sir Hector Archibald MacDonald, KCB, DSO (Scottish Gaelic: Eachann Gilleasbaig MacDhòmhnaill; 4 March 1853 – 25 March 1903), also known as Fighting Mac, was a British Army officer.

The son of a crofter, MacDonald left school before he was 15, enlisted in the Gordon Highlanders as a private at 17, and finished his career as a major general, a rare example of a British Army general who rose through the ranks on merit alone. He distinguished himself in action at the Battle of Omdurman (1898), became a popular hero in Scotland and England, and was knighted for his service in the Second Boer War. Posted to Ceylon (now Sri Lanka) as Commander-in-Chief of British forces, he committed suicide in 1903 following accusations of homosexual activity with local boys.

== Early life ==
Hector MacDonald was born on a farm at Rootfield, near Dingwall, Ross-shire, Scotland. He was, as were most people in the area at the time, a Gaelic speaker and in later life went by the name Eachann nan Cath ('Hector of the Battles'). His father, William MacDonald, was a crofter and a stonemason. His mother was Ann Boyd, the daughter of John Boyd of Killiechoilum, Whitebridge, and Cradlehall, near Inverness. Hector's brothers were the Rev. William MacDonald Jr., known as "Preaching Mac", Donald, John, and Ewen. At the age of 15, MacDonald was apprenticed to a draper in Dingwall and then moved on to the Royal Clan Tartan and Tweed Warehouse in Inverness, an establishment owned by William Mackay.

== Military career ==
On 7 March 1870 MacDonald joined the Inverness-shire Highland Rifle Volunteers, and in 1871 enlisted in the 92nd Gordon Highlanders at Fort George. He rose rapidly through the noncommissioned ranks, and had already been a Colour Sergeant for some years when his distinguished conduct in the presence of the enemy during the Second Afghan War led to his being offered the choice of being recommended for the Victoria Cross or commissioned in his regiment; he chose the latter. This was an extremely rare honour (7 January 1880).

MacDonald served as a subaltern in the First Boer War (1880–81), and at the Battle of Majuba Hill, where he was made prisoner, his bravery was so conspicuous that General Joubert gave him back his sword. In 1885 he served under Sir Evelyn Wood in the reorganization of the Egyptian army, and took part in the Nile Expedition of that year. In 1888 he became a regimental captain in the British service, but continued in Egyptian service, concentrating on training Sudanese troops. In 1889 he received the Distinguished Service Order for his conduct at the Battle of Toski and in 1891, after the action at Tokar, he was promoted substantive major.

During the Mahdist War, MacDonald commanded a brigade of the Egyptian army in the Dongola Expedition (1896), and subsequently distinguished himself at Abu Hamed (7 August 1897) and Atbara (8 April 1898). At the Battle of Omdurman (2 September 1898) the British commander, Lord Kitchener, unwittingly exposed his flanks to the Dervish (i.e., Mahdist) army. MacDonald swung his men by companies in an arc as the Dervishes charged and by skillful manoeuvring held his ground until Kitchener could redeploy his brigades. When the fight was over MacDonald's troops had an average of only two rounds left per man.

After Omdurman, MacDonald became a household name in Britain. He received a brevet promotion to colonel in the British Army, appointed an aide-de-camp to Queen Victoria, and received the thanks of Parliament and a cash award. His fame was especially high in his native Scotland: on 12 May that year, described as "one of the heroes of Omdurman," he was entertained to luncheon by the City of Edinburgh Council, and many Scots felt that MacDonald, and not Kitchener, was the true hero.

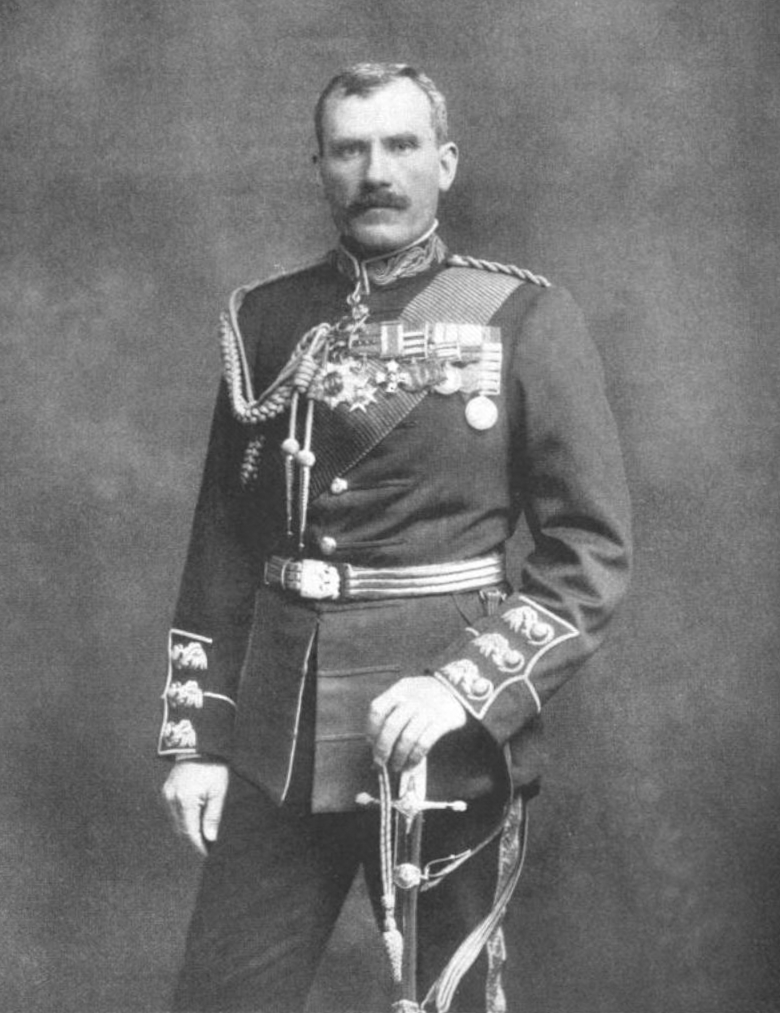
In The Sketch, 27 December 1899

In October 1899, MacDonald received the temporary rank of brigadier general and was seconded to command the Sirhind district in the Punjab with headquarters at Umballa. Following the outbreak of war in South Africa the same month, he was in December ordered there to command the Highland Brigade, part of the army of Lord Roberts. He received the substantive rank of colonel on 4 January 1900, arrived in Cape Town on 18 January 1900 by the transport Dwarka, and six days later assumed command of the Highland Brigade stationed at Modder River, with the local rank of major general. While in South Africa he prepared the way for Lord Roberts's march to the relief of Kimberley by seizing Koodoesberg (5–8 February 1900), and by this demonstration the attention of the Boers was distracted from the main advance. Later the same month he took part in the Battle of Paardeberg (16–27 February 1900), where he was wounded by a gunshot in the foot in an attack on a Boer laager. He was discharged from hospital in mid-March, and took part in later operations in Bloemfontein and Pretoria. In April 1901 he was knighted as a Knight Commander of the Order of the Bath (KCB) for his services (dated to November 1900).

MacDonald returned to the United Kingdom in May 1901, but soon left for India where he had been appointed to command the South District Army, and was in command of in Belgaum district, near Madras. In early 1902 he was appointed Commander-in-Chief of British troops in Ceylon (now Sri Lanka) with the temporary rank of major general while so employed, and he arrived there and took up the command on 26 March 1902.

== Ceylon: scandal and suicide ==
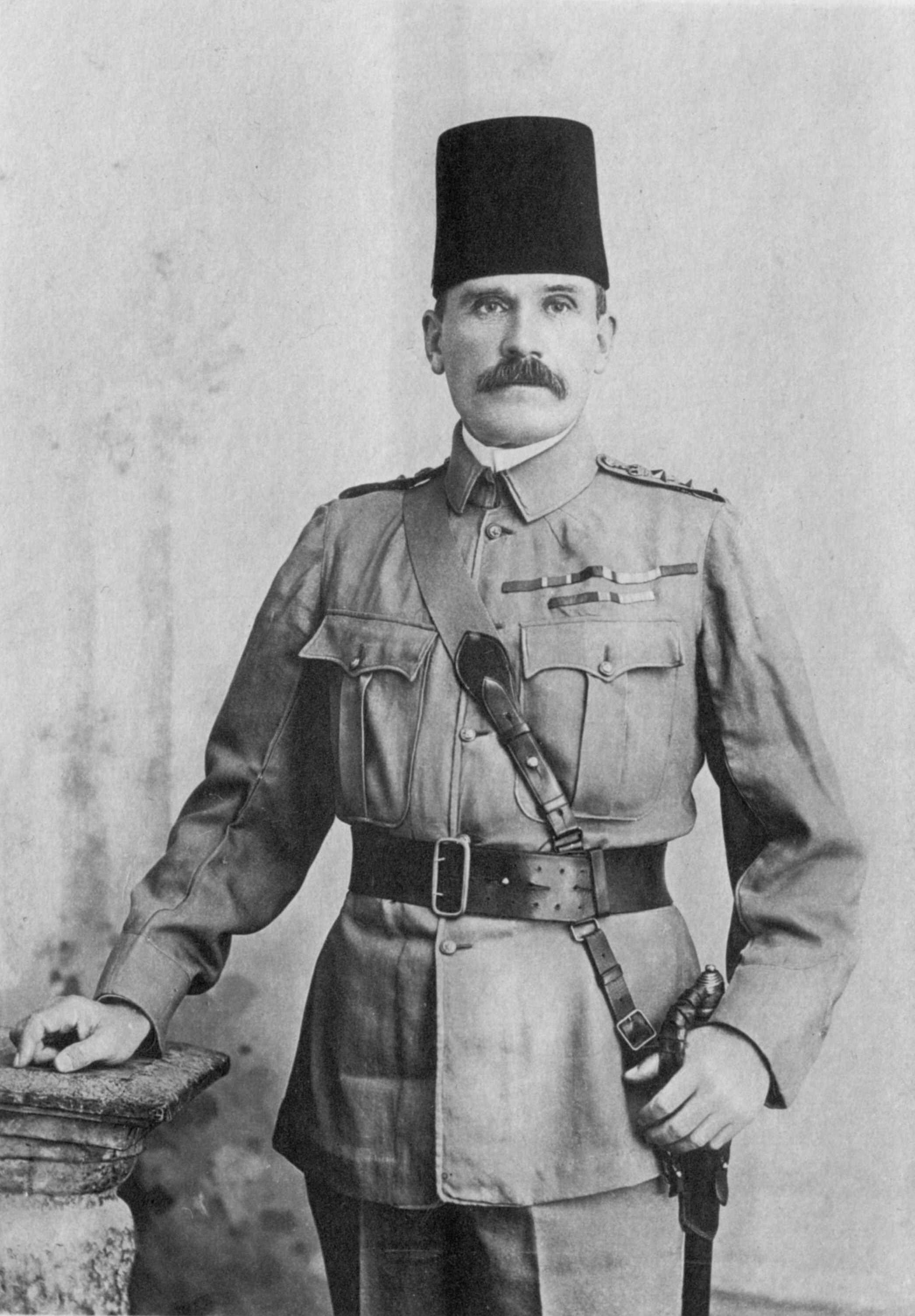
Colonel MacDonald in Egypt

Historian Ronald Hyam comments that "Ceylon furnished MacDonald with a lethal combination of a military command which was inactive and uninteresting, and a community of boys who were interesting and very active." He ruffled the feathers of the civilians by forcing the unkempt and ill-disciplined local militia, most of them the sons of British planters, to show more spit and polish; he deeply offended the Governor, Sir Joseph West Ridgeway, when he yelled at him to get off the parade ground; and compounded the process of alienation by declining the social invitations of the British community and consorting instead with the locals.

Rumours began circulating that he was having a sexual relationship with the two teenage sons of a Burgher named De Saram, and that he was patronising a "dubious club" attended by British and Sinhalese youths. Matters came to a crisis when a tea-planter informed Ridgeway that he had surprised Sir Hector in a railway carriage with four Sinhalese boys; further allegations followed from other prominent members of the colonial establishment, with the threat of even more to come, involving up to seventy witnesses. Ridgeway advised MacDonald to return to London, his main concern being to avoid a massive scandal: "Some, indeed most, of his victims ... are the sons of the best-known men in the Colony, English and native", he wrote, noting that he had persuaded the local press to keep quiet in hopes that "no more mud" would be stirred up.

In London MacDonald "was probably told by the king that the best thing he could do was to shoot himself". Lord Roberts, now commander-in-chief of the Army, advised MacDonald to go back to Ceylon and face a court martial to clear his name. (There was no question of a criminal trial as MacDonald's alleged offence was not illegal in Ceylon.) MacDonald left London for Ceylon. Meanwhile, Ridgeway, coming under increasing pressure in the Legislature, revealed that "serious charges" had been laid and that the general was returning to a court martial. MacDonald, reading this in the morning newspaper over breakfast in the Hôtel Régina in Paris, returned to his room and shot himself.

=== Investigation ===
The case file is thought to have been destroyed soon after MacDonald's suicide. A government commission released a report on the tragedy on 29 June 1903, which concluded:

In reference to the grave charges made against the late Sir Hector MacDonald, we, the appointed and undersigned Commissioners, individually and collectively declare on oath that, after the most careful, minute, and exhaustive inquiry and investigation of the whole circumstances and facts connected with the sudden and unexpected death of the late Sir Hector MacDonald, unanimously and unmistakably find absolutely no reason or crime whatsoever which would create feelings such as would determine suicide, in preference to conviction of any crime affecting the moral and irreproachable character of so brave, so fearless, so glorious and unparalleled a hero: and we firmly believe the cause which gave rise to the inhuman and cruel suggestions of crime were prompted through vulgar feelings of spite and jealousy in his rising to such a high rank of distinction in the British Army: and, while we have taken the most reliable and trustworthy evidence from every accessible and conceivable source, have without hesitation come to the conclusion that there is not visible the slightest particle of truth in foundation of any crime, and we find the late Sir Hector MacDonald has been cruelly assassinated by vile and slandering tongues. While honourably acquitting the late Sir Hector MacDonald of any charge whatsoever, we cannot but deplore the sad circumstances of the case that have fallen so disastrously on one whom we have found innocent of any crime attributed to him.

=== Later assessments ===
Over a century after MacDonald's death his many modern supporters assert that the crofter's son was the victim of a frameup by the British upper class, motivated by jealousy and snobbery, with the allegations of homosexuality and paedophilia a fabrication. Yet MacDonald's alleged homosexuality had been a concern to his superiors even before Ceylon. In 1900 Roberts and Kitchener had discussed rumours of a dalliance between Sir Hector and a Boer prisoner of war in South Africa, and two years later Kitchener mentioned his uneasiness over the General's behaviour while posted in India.

It is possible that attitudes within the British Army hierarchy were influenced by his status as a commoner and the son of a Highland crofter. There were comparable rumours about other commanders from the British upper class, including "Chinese" Gordon and Field Marshals Montgomery and Auchinleck, but they were protected by the loyalty of their staff; only MacDonald was required to face a court martial. A clergyman at the time commented: "Had he been the son of a duke, an easier way of escape could have been made for him."

== Legacy ==
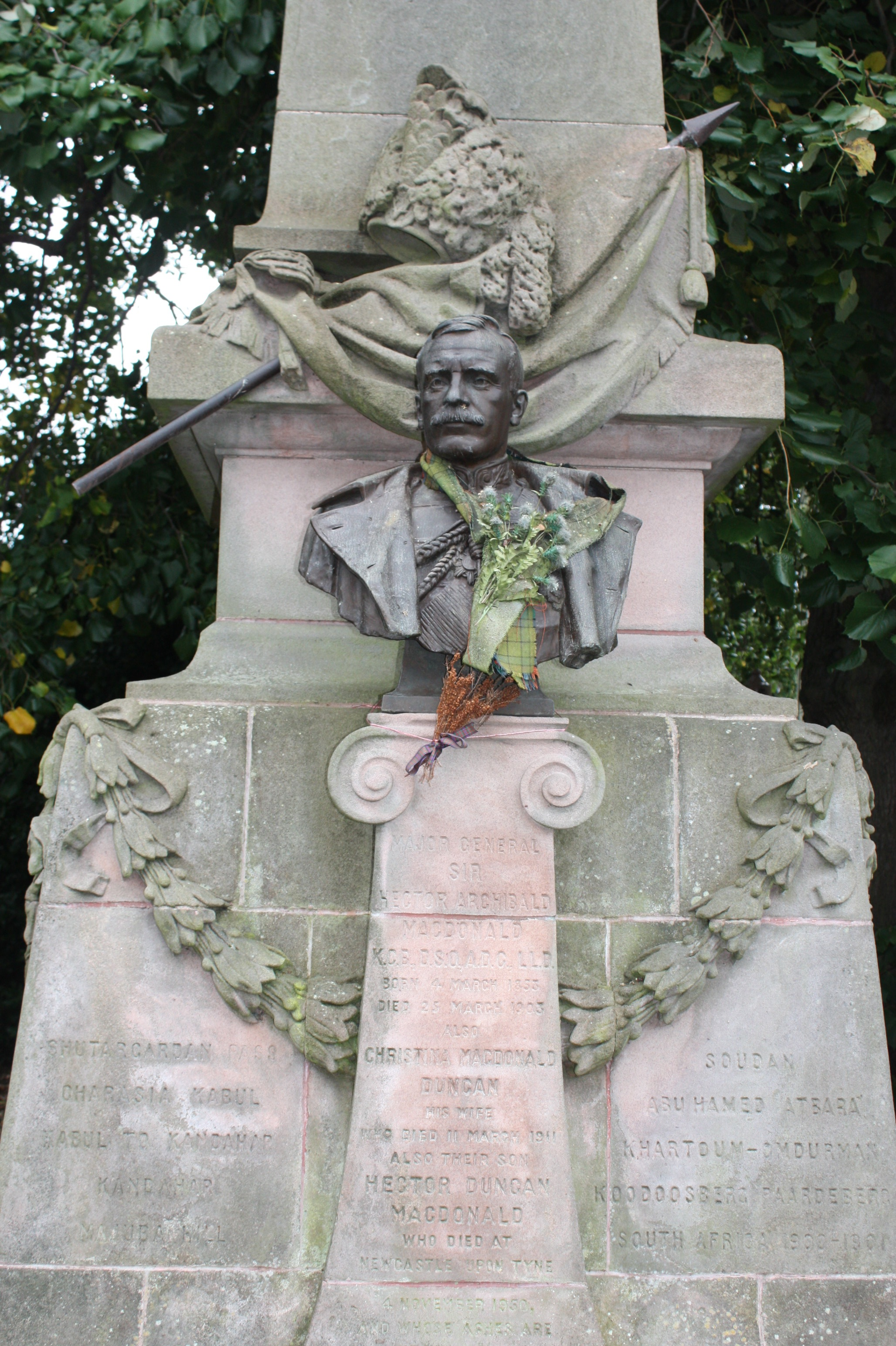
Grave of Hector MacDonald in Dean Cemetery, Edinburgh

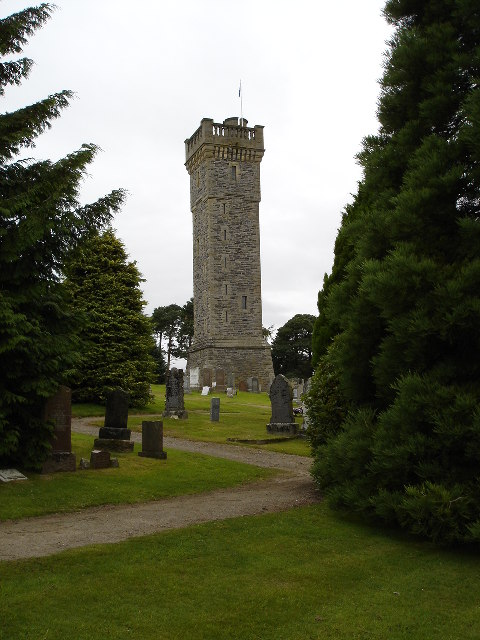
Memorial above Dingwall

The suicide of the war hero caused great public shock, as did the discovery that MacDonald had a wife and a son. In 1884, aged 31, he had secretly married a girl of fifteen. They had seen each other only four times in the subsequent nineteen years. Lady MacDonald died in 1911. MacDonald's son became an engineer and died in 1951.

=== Funeral and memorials ===
MacDonald's funeral was held at Dean Cemetery, Edinburgh, conducted by Rev Wallace Williamson, and 30,000 people turned up to pay their last respects. In the weeks following thousands more from all over the world came to say farewell, James Scott Skinner wrote a tune in his honour called Hector the Hero, and Robert W. Service wrote his poem "Fighting Mac".

The grave lies towards the north-east in the first northern extension. A highly elaborate monument including a bronze bust of Sir Hector by William Birnie Rhind was erected on the grave the following year.

MacDonald remains a national hero in Scotland. A 100-foot-high (30-metre) memorial was erected above Dingwall in 1907, as well as another memorial at Mulbuie on the Black Isle, near where MacDonald was born.

=== Survival rumours and conspiracy theories ===
In March 1911, the Ashburton Guardian reported that MacDonald had been seen in Manchuria, and another report that a non-commissioned officer who had served with MacDonald in India and Egypt had seen him breakfasting at the Astor House in Shanghai two years earlier.

Conspiracy theories emerged after his death. It was rumoured that he had staged his suicide and had defected to Germany, taking up the identity of General August von Mackensen after the real Mackensen was supposed to have died of cancer. During the First World War the German High Command attempted to capitalise on his continuing popularity among Scottish rank and file in the British Army by fostering the rumours that MacDonald was von Mackensen.

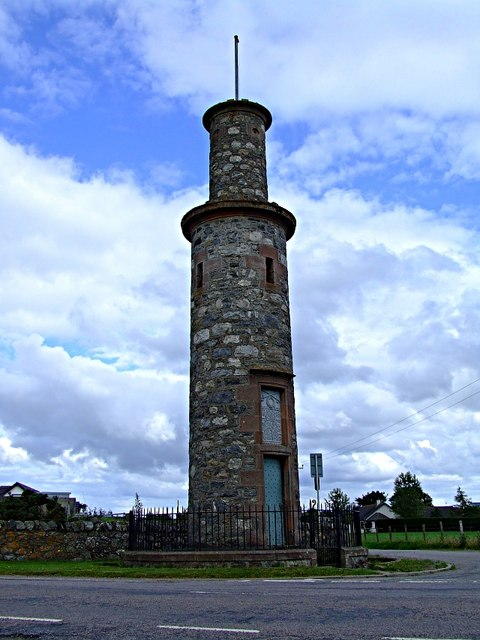
Memorial at Mulbuie

=== Cultural references ===
MacDonald is often said to have been the model for the soldier who appeared on the label for Camp Coffee.

"Fighting Mac" appears in the music hall song of 1900, "The Baby's Name", written by CW Murphy and Albert Hall.

Along with the occultist Aleister Crowley, MacDonald is one of the central characters of the novel The Devil's Paintbrush by Jake Arnott. Arnott's novel uses a historical meeting between Crowley and MacDonald in Paris "as a springboard for a fictional tale that entwines the two figures closely together and charts the final days of MacDonald's life."

Hector MacDonald Laws Waller, captain of HMAS Perth, was named after him.

Scottish fiddler J Scott Skinner, composed a lament as a tribute to MacDonald, entitled Hector the Hero. Lyrics by Thomas McWilliamin were set to the air.
