= Oldmeldrum =

Coordinates: 57.335°N 2.320°W

Oldmeldrum: Scottish Gaelic: Meall Druim
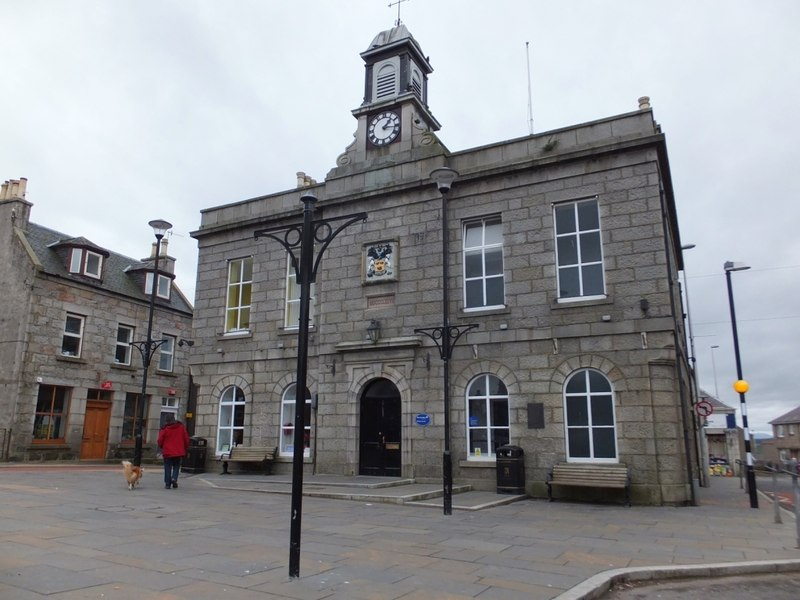
- Oldmeldrum Town Hall

- Location within Aberdeenshire
- Population: 3,120 (2020)
- OS grid reference: NJ808272
- Council area: Aberdeenshire
- Lieutenancy area: Aberdeenshire
- Country: Scotland
- Sovereign state: United Kingdom
- Post town: INVERURIE
- Postcode district: AB51
- Dialling code: 01651
- Police: Scotland
- Fire: Scottish
- Ambulance: Scottish
- UK Parliament: Gordon and Buchan
- Scottish Parliament: Aberdeenshire East

Oldmeldrum (commonly known as Meldrum) is a village and parish in the Formartine area of Aberdeenshire, not far from Inverurie in North East Scotland. Oldmeldrum is home to one of the oldest whisky distilleries in Scotland, Glen Garioch, which was built in 1797. Local industries are agriculture and engineering services connected to the oil industry in Aberdeen.

== Prehistory and archaeology ==
Archaeological excavations carried out in advance of the construction of a new bypass road around the north of Oldmeldrum in the summer of 2005 revealed the remains of three Bronze Age ring-ditch roundhouses. Archaeologists believe these formed part of an area of open settlement, indicating that the first settlement at Oldmeldrum dates to around 3500 years ago.

== History ==
The Battle of Barra was fought near the Hill of Barra in May 1308 (though some sources suggest an earlier date) between the forces of Scots King Robert Bruce and John Comyn, 3rd Earl of Buchan. Oldmeldrum was made a burgh of barony in 1672, and the parish of Meldrum was known as "Bethelnie" until 1684. In the 18th century, the town became a centre of the hosiery trade. Oldmeldrum Burgh had a population of 1,110 in 1911 and 1,103 in 1951.

== Culture and community ==
In June each year, Oldmeldrum hosts the "Meldrum Sports", which features highland games, highland dancing, piping, five-a-side football, displays, stalls, and a beer tent. The Sports were first held in 1930, when a group of residents got together to raise funds to provide cocoa to the local children. There has also been an Arts and Music Festival in Oldmeldrum; this has been held in March 2005, 2006, 2007, and 2009 by the Rotary Club to promote local singers, musicians, artists, and photographers.

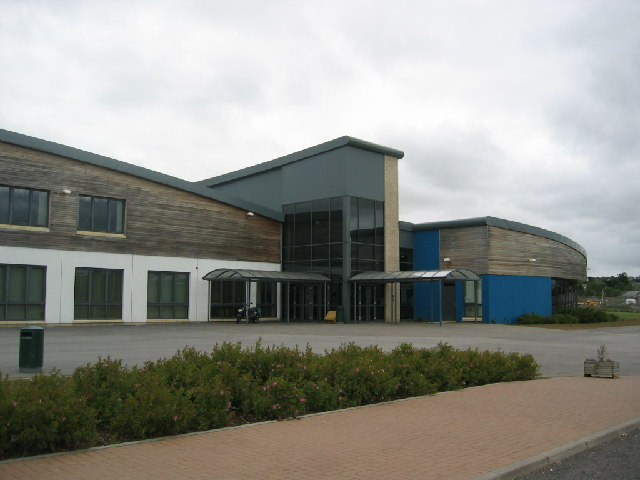
Meldrum Academy

Oldmeldrum has a primary school and a secondary school, the Meldrum Academy, which also includes the local library. A skatepark was built in June 2009 within Oldmeldrum Pleasure Park, a community park to the east of the main Banff to Aberdeen Road.

== Landmarks ==
The remains of a prehistoric hill fort are at Barra Hill, 2 miles (3 kilometres) south of Oldmeldrum; the hill fort was excavated by Murray Cook of Rampart Scotland. Results indicated that it has had at least three phases of fortification: before 500 BC, after 500 BC and again by the Picts around AD 400. This project formed part of the Hill forts of Strathdon Project Another ancient site is Sheldon Stone Circle which is about 3 mi (5 km) to the south-east of Oldmedrum.

To the north of the village is Meldrum House, a mansion and castle built in the 17th century, and which is now a hotel and golf course. Oldmeldrum Town Hall was completed in 1877.

To the east of the village is the Oldmeldrum Golf Club. Founded in 1885, its 14th fairway contains a rock where John Comyn, Earl of Buchan is said to have lain and lamented his loss to Robert the Bruce at the Battle of Barra. In 2006, a 72-year-old golfer died in a bunker on the first hole. Also to the east of Oldmeldrum is the ruined Tolquhon Castle which is noted for its highly ornamented gatehouse. The castle was built between 1584 and 1589 and is now maintained by Historic Scotland; the castle is open to the public during the summer months.

Oldmeldrum is home to one of the oldest whisky distilleries in Scotland, Glen Garioch, which was built in 1797. Glen Garioch's visitor centre is open year-round and includes tours of the working distillery.

Haddo House, a stately home run by the National Trust for Scotland, is 7 mi (11 km) north-east of Oldmeldrum.

From Oldmeldrum, there are good views of nearby Bennachie (mountain).

== Images ==
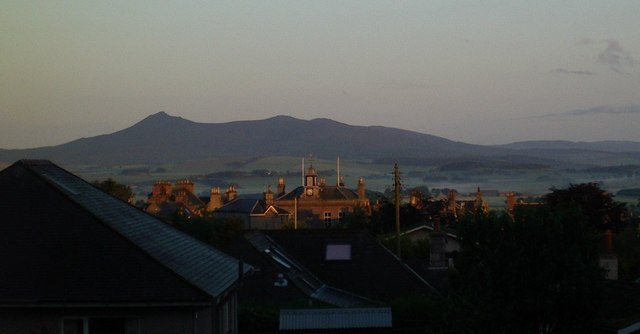

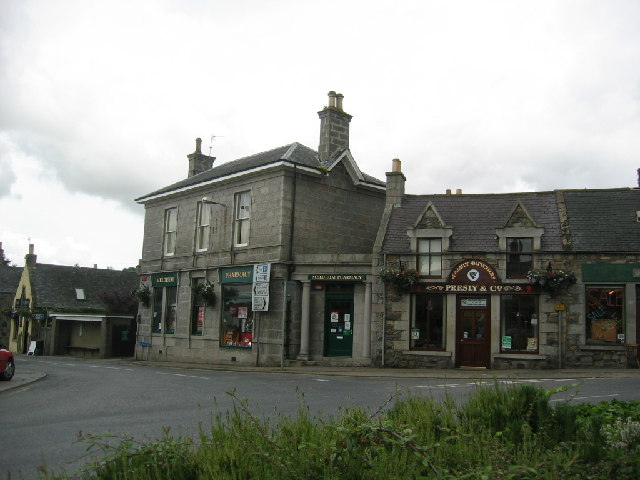

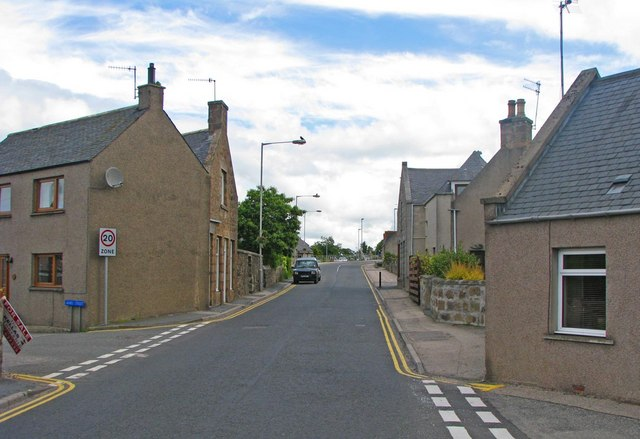

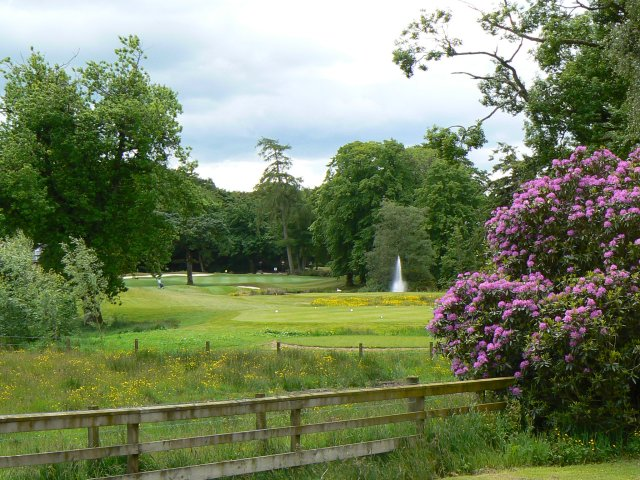

== Transport ==
The A947 road from Aberdeen to Banff runs through the centre of the village. Old Meldrum railway station served Oldmeldrum on a line from Inverurie through Lethenty and Lochter until 1965.

== Notable residents ==
- George Chrystal, a mathematician.
- Douglas Scott Falconer, a geneticist.
- William Forsyth, a botanist (yellow forsythia named after him) and ancestor of Bruce Forsyth. The William Forsyth Community Garden opened in Oldmeldrum in 2008.
- Donald Gordon, a Canadian businessman.
- William Keith, a California landscape artist
- Sir Patrick Manson, the founder of the field of tropical medicine, was born at Cromlet Hill, now a guesthouse.
- George Smith Morris and Willie Kemp, Doric musicians related by marriage.
- Sir George Watt, botanist in India
