= Kirkton of Bourtie stone circle =

Recumbent stone circle in Scotland

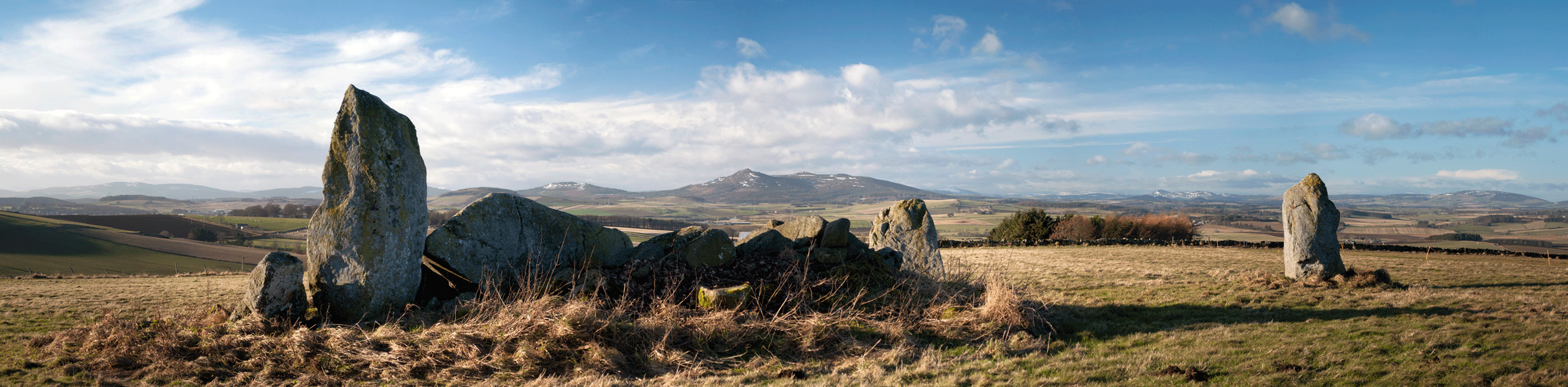
- Stone circle in 2011
- Interactive map of Kirkton of Bourtie stone circle
- 57.314085°N 2.3321229°W
- Type: Recumbent stone circle
- Periods: Neolithic-Bronze Age
- Location: Aberdeenshire, Scotland
- OS grid reference: NJ8009324884

History
- Built: c. 4000-2500 BC

Site notes
- Diameter: 18 m (59 ft)

Scheduled monument
- Official name: Kirkton of Bourtie stone circle
- Type: Prehistoric ritual and funerary: stone circle or ring
- Designated: 17 August 1925
- Reference no.: SM26

Kirkton of Bourtie stone circle is a recumbent stone circle located in Aberdeenshire, Scotland. It is situated about 2 3/4 miles (4.4 km) to the northeast of Inverurie at the end of a south-facing hillside just outside the hamlet of Kirkton of Bourtie. It stands on arable land near a minor road at an altitude of 515 ft (157 m) above sea level, with the Hill of Barra prominently visible to the north.

The circle is badly damaged, with only the eastern flanker, the recumbent and two western stones surviving. The recumbent is broken but is the longest of all known such stones; it measures around 17 ft (5.2 m) in length by 3 ft 4 in (1.02 m) broad and with a girth of 6 ft 4 in (1.93 m). It probably weighs upwards of thirty tons. The stone sits on a slightly raised mound and is aligned with the "major southern moonset". The east stone is 9 ft 10 in (3.00 m) high, while the west stones are 6 ft (1.8 m) and 7 ft 9 in (2.36 m) high.

The other stones, of which there were once probably six or seven, are missing, but it is thought that the circle may originally have had a diameter of around 71 ft (22 m). Some stones that may possibly be from the circle have been incorporated in a nearby gateway and wall. Fragmentary cairns are visible within the ring.

The area around the stones appears to have been used as a dump for naturally deposited stones that have been cleared off the fields. A "rude pavement" in the circle that was described in 1867 has by now disappeared entirely. This may have been the base of a now-destroyed cairn. The circle's partial destruction may well have occurred in fairly recent history. Writing in the late 18th century, the Rev Thomas Shepherd referred to the presence in the area of "three Druidical circles here, two of them pretty entire". Half a century later, only two of those remained, namely Kirkton of Bourtie and Sheldon stone circle, the latter of which was said to be in "a state of considerable preservation". By the time it was mapped by the Ordnance Survey in 1867 the Kirkton of Bourtie circle had been reduced to its present four stones; the map-makers reported, "No one [in] the parish remembers having seen it in any other condition than at present." The circle was scheduled by the Office of Works as an ancient monument in 1925, but its interior remained under the plough until as late as 1999.
