= Hector the Hero =

1903 song by James Scott Skinner

"Hector the Hero" is a classic lament penned by Scottish composer and fiddler James Scott Skinner in 1903. It was written as a tribute to Major-General Hector MacDonald, a distinguished Scottish general around the turn of the century. MacDonald, a friend of Skinner's, had not long before died by suicide after accusations and charges against him.

As it is a lament, it is played slowly and sadly, often using instruments such as the violin, piano, guitar or bagpipes. It has been covered by many artists since its release, and is still reasonably well known today.

As it was written in 1903, the lyrics, by Thomas McWilliam, and music to "Hector the Hero" have passed into the public domain.

== Lyrics ==
Lament him, ye mountains of Ross-shire;
Your tears be the dew and the rain;
Ye forests and straths, let the sobbing winds
Unburden your grief and pain.
Lament him, ye warm-hearted clansmen,
And mourn for a kinsman so true
The pride of the Highlands, the valiant MacDonald
Will never come back to you.

O, wail for the mighty in battle,
Loud lift ye the Coronach strain;
For Hector, the Hero, of deathless fame,
Will never come back again.

Lament him, ye sons of old Scotia,
Ye kinsmen on many a shore;
A patriot-warrior, fearless of foe,
Has fallen to rise no more.

O cherish his triumph and glory
On Omdurman's death-stricken plain,
His glance like the eagle's, his heart like the lion's
His laurels a nation's gain.

O, wail for the mighty in battle,
Loud lift ye the Coronach strain;
For Hector, the Hero, of deathless fame,
Will never come back again.

O rest thee, brave heart, in thy slumber,
Forgotten shall ne'er be thy name;
The love and the mercy of Heaven be thine;
Our love thou must ever claim.
To us thou art Hector the Hero,
The chivalrous, dauntless, and true;
The hills and the glens, and the hearts of a nation,
Re-echo the wail for you.

O, wail for the mighty in battle,
Loud lift ye the Coronach strain;
For Hector, the Hero, of deathless fame,
Will never come back again.
