= List of listed buildings in Old Meldrum, Aberdeenshire =

This is a list of listed buildings in the parish of Old Meldrum in Aberdeenshire, Scotland.

== List ==
Name	Location	Date Listed	Grid Ref. (Note: Sometimes known as OSGB36, the grid reference (where provided) is based on the British national grid reference system used by the Ordnance Survey. • "Guide to National Grid". Ordnance Survey. • "Get-a-map". Ordnance Survey.)	Geo-coordinates	Notes	LB Number (Note: Historic Environment Scotland assign a unique alphanumeric identifier to each designated site in Scotland, for listed buildings this always begins with "LB", for example "LB12345".)	Image
Post Office, Market Square And Cran, 7 Market Square				57°20′05″N 2°19′12″W	Category C(S)	38888	Upload Photo
Cottage (Now Store, Scorgie) 7 Market Square				57°20′05″N 2°19′12″W	Category C(S)	38889	Upload Photo
Morris's Hotel, Market Square				57°20′06″N 2°19′13″W	Category C(S)	38891	Upload Photo
H. Pauline And Fraser's Garage Property, Urquhart Road				57°20′08″N 2°19′06″W	Category C(S)	38897	Upload Photo
18 King Street				57°20′13″N 2°19′10″W	Category C(S)	38899	Upload Photo
Kirk Street (North Side), Davidson				57°20′06″N 2°19′08″W	Category C(S)	38876	Upload Photo
Kirk Street (South Side) 7, "The Lilacs" South Road, And 'Manderlea' Kirk Street				57°20′05″N 2°19′07″W	Category C(S)	38879	Upload Photo
4 Market Square				57°20′05″N 2°19′11″W	Category B	38887	Upload Photo
3 Baker Street				57°20′07″N 2°19′11″W	Category C(S)	38894	Upload Photo
Broombank, James Street Including Garden Walls And Outbuilding				57°20′13″N 2°19′06″W	Category B	38902	Upload Photo
Kirk Street (North Side) A.W. Gray Ltd. Bakery And 11, 13, 15				57°20′05″N 2°19′06″W	Category C(S)	38877	Upload Photo
"Auquharney" South Road				57°20′04″N 2°19′07″W	Category C(S)	38882	Upload Photo
Meldrum Arms Hotel, Hall Building				57°20′04″N 2°19′10″W	Category C(S)	38885	Upload Photo
Churchyard Of Old Meldrum, Excluding Modern Cemetery Extension				57°20′08″N 2°18′44″W	Category C(S)	38874	Upload Photo
Kirk Street (North Side)				57°20′06″N 2°19′07″W	Category C(S)	38875	Upload Photo
Town Hall, Square				57°20′06″N 2°19′12″W	Category B	38892	Upload another image
Cromletbank, South Road				57°20′03″N 2°19′00″W	Category C(S)	38904	Upload Photo
Cromlethill, South Road				57°20′02″N 2°18′57″W	Category B	38905	Upload Photo
Distillery Road Glengarioch Distillery				57°20′18″N 2°19′10″W	Category B	38906	Upload Photo
Kirk Street (West Side) 4, And 3 South Road				57°20′05″N 2°19′08″W	Category B	38878	Upload Photo
Meldrum Arms Hotel, Main Building				57°20′05″N 2°19′09″W	Category B	38883	Upload Photo
7 Market Square, Scorgie				57°20′05″N 2°19′12″W	Category C(S)	38890	Upload Photo
J.S. Milne (House And Shop) Market Square And Commercial Road				57°20′06″N 2°19′14″W	Category C(S)	38893	Upload Photo
1 King Street (2 Houses)				57°20′09″N 2°19′07″W	Category B	38898	Upload Photo
Parish Church Of Old Meldrum				57°20′08″N 2°18′44″W	Category C(S)	38873	Upload Photo
1 Major Lane, Off Urquhart Road				57°20′07″N 2°19′06″W	Category C(S)	38896	Upload Photo
Old Meldrum 5 King Street				57°20′10″N 2°19′07″W	Category C(S)	38900	Upload Photo
Old Meldrum 8 King Street				57°20′11″N 2°19′06″W	Category C(S)	38901	Upload Photo
Kirk Street (South Side) 10				57°20′05″N 2°19′05″W	Category C(S)	38880	Upload Photo
Meldrum Arms Hotel, Sailor Statue				57°20′04″N 2°19′09″W	Category C(S)	38884	Upload Photo
Kirkhill House				57°20′06″N 2°18′46″W	Category C(S)	38903	Upload Photo
"Fintry" And Wilson, South Road				57°20′05″N 2°19′07″W	Category C(S)	38881	Upload Photo
Former Brewery, Urquhart Road				57°20′07″N 2°19′07″W	Category C(S)	38895	Upload Photo

== Key ==
The scheme for classifying buildings in Scotland is:

- Category A: "buildings of national or international importance, either architectural or historic; or fine, little-altered examples of some particular period, style or building type."
- Category B: "buildings of regional or more than local importance; or major examples of some particular period, style or building type, which may have been altered."
- Category C: "buildings of local importance; lesser examples of any period, style, or building type, as originally constructed or moderately altered; and simple traditional buildings which group well with other listed buildings."

In March 2016 there were 47,288 listed buildings in Scotland. Of these, 8% were Category A, and 50% were Category B, with the remaining 42% being Category C.

== See also ==
- List of listed buildings in Aberdeenshire
