= Sheldon stone circle =

Stone circle in Aberdeenshire, Scotland

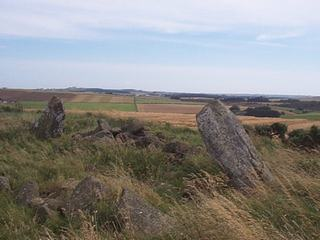
- The Sheldon stone circle on the crest of the hill
- Interactive map of Sheldon stone circle
- 57.314706°N 2.2956551°W
- Type: Recumbent stone circle
- Location: near Oldmeldrum
- Region: Aberdeenshire

Site notes
- Public access: Yes

Scheduled monument
- Official name: Sheldon, stone circle
- Type: Prehistoric ritual and funerary: stone circle or ring
- Designated: 17 August 1925
- Reference no.: SM45

Sheldon stone circle is a prehistoric stone circle located to the south of Oldmeldrum in Aberdeenshire, Scotland.

== Description ==
Sheldon stone circle is also known as Sheildon, Shelden, Shieldon, Sheldon of Bourtie and Sheldon of Bourtree. It is located north of Sheldon farm and lies to the south of Oldmeldrum in Aberdeenshire. Sitting on a knoll, it is a scheduled ancient monument.

The circle has five remaining stones, with two outliers. It is 24 metres in diameter. Researchers followed Alexander Keiller in positing that Sheldon was a recumbent stone circle, despite there being no remaining recumbent. Recent work by Historic Environment Scotland suggests the circle was not a recumbent stone circle.

== See also ==
- Kirkton of Bourtie stone circle
