= Meldrum House =

Category B listed house in Oldmeldrum, Aberdeenshire

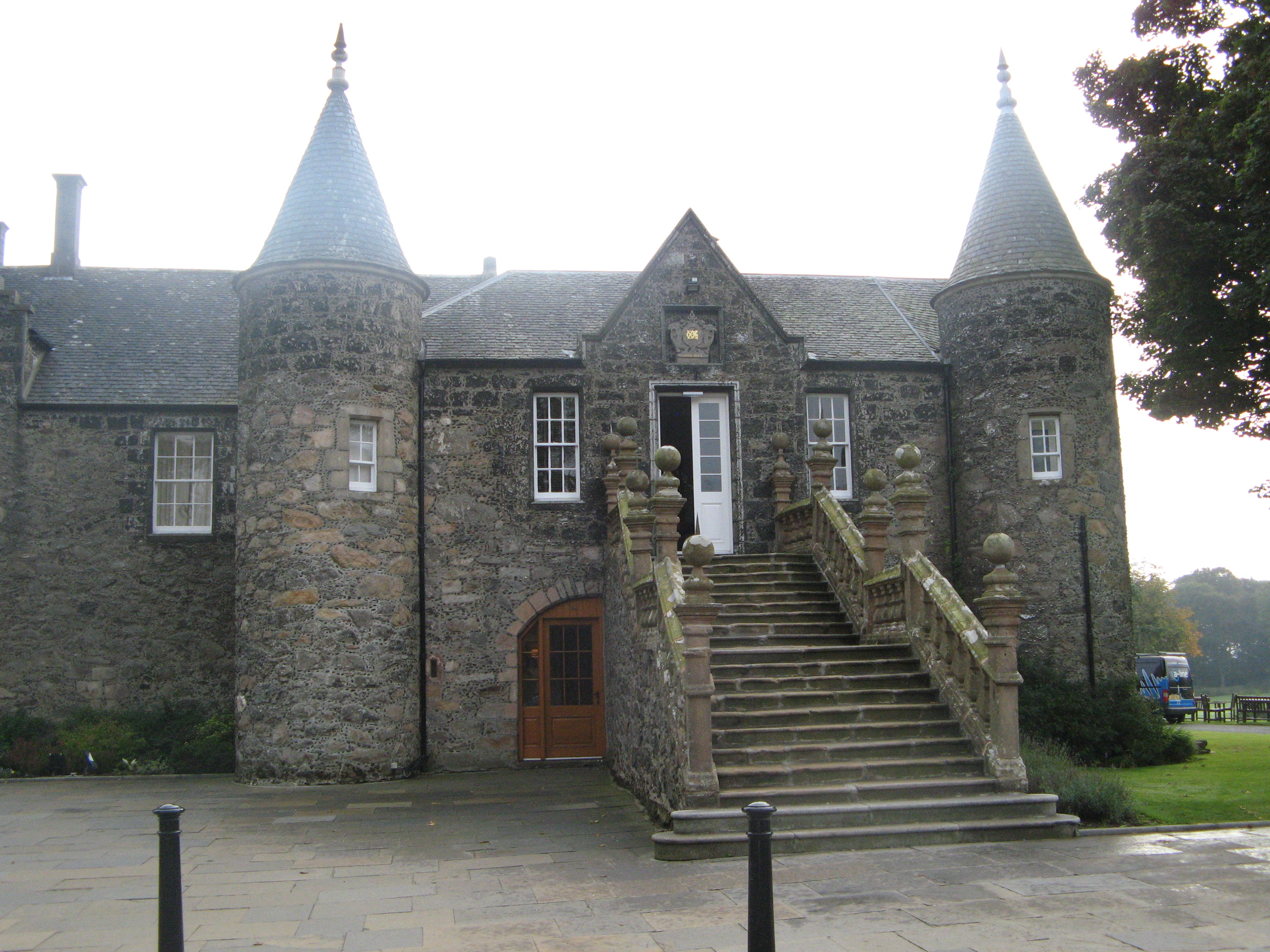
- Main entrance in 2013

- Location within Aberdeenshire

General information
- Architectural style: Neo-Jacobean
- Location: Oldmeldrum, Aberdeenshire, Scotland
- Coordinates: 57.344058°N 2.3151195°W
- Completed: c. 1625 (401 years ago)

Meldrum House is a Category B listed country house and estate in Oldmeldrum, Aberdeenshire, Scotland. It dates to 1625 (although its datestone is not in its original position), and was designated a listed building on 15 April 1971.

== History ==
The nucleus of the house is the original part completed in 1625. In the 17th and 18th centuries the house was the seat of the Urquhart family. In the mid 18th century, the local laird, William Urquhart, who was the 4th Urquhart of Meldrum and 17th Chief of the Clan Urquhart, commissioned Oldmeldrum Town Hall. Alterations were made to the surrounding structure of Meldrum House in the 18th and 19th centuries. Archibald Simpson reconstructed it between 1836 and 1839 as a symmetrical neo-Jacobean three-storey mansion. W. L. Duncan further reconstructed it between 1934 and 1937 at the request of then-owner Lady Doris Duff.

The house is said to be haunted by a "White Lady". Early on the morning of Christmas Day 1617, while the laird of Meldrum was away hunting with his hawks, his servant John Gordon abducted Marjorie Gordon, daughter of Grisel Stewart, Lady Meldrum, from the house.

The estate operates as a hotel and golf course.

The house's outer gate, stable and coachhouse block, dated 1628, is Category A listed, having been designated on 15 April 1971.

== Gallery ==
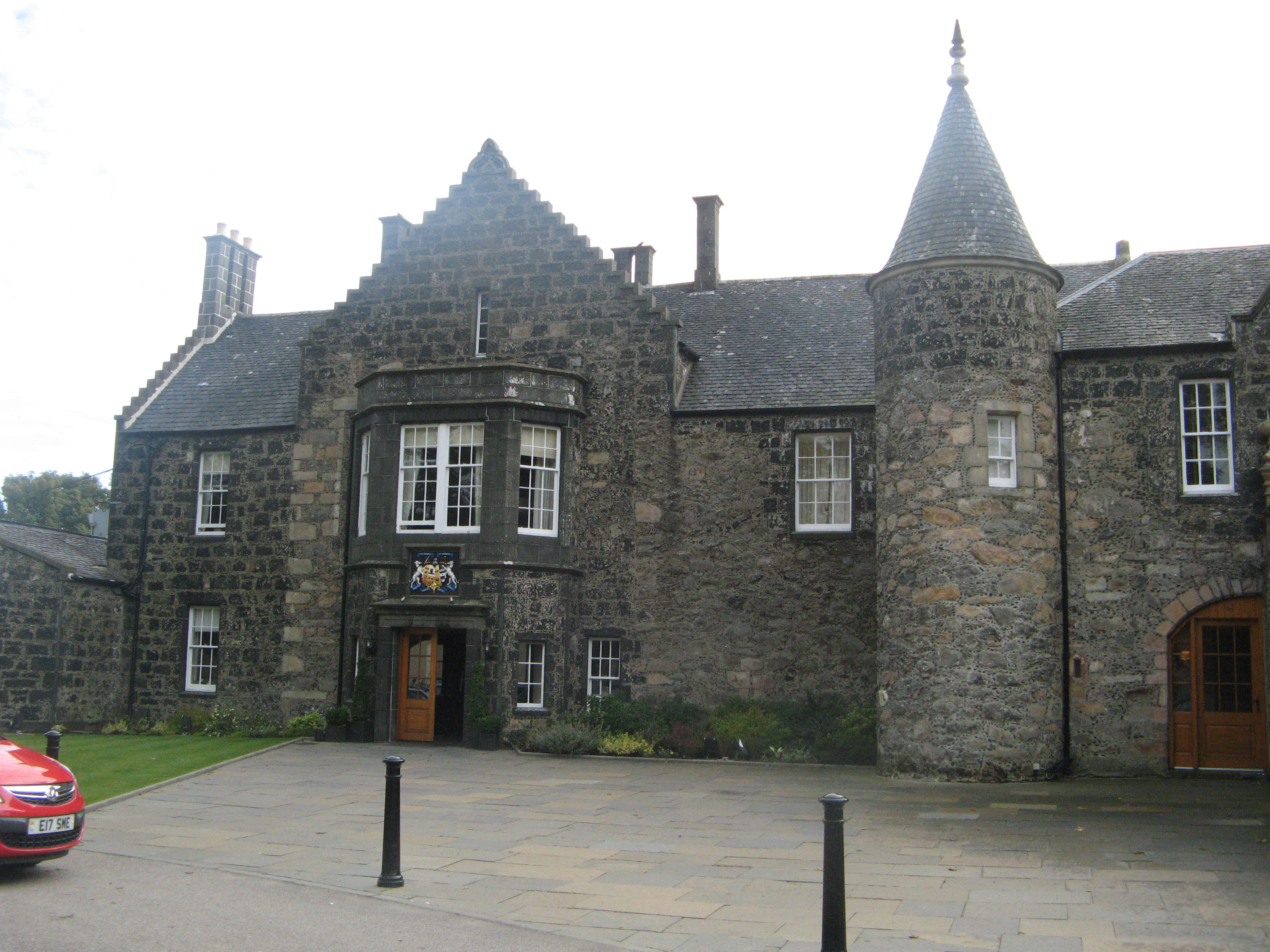
Second entrance, pictured in 2013

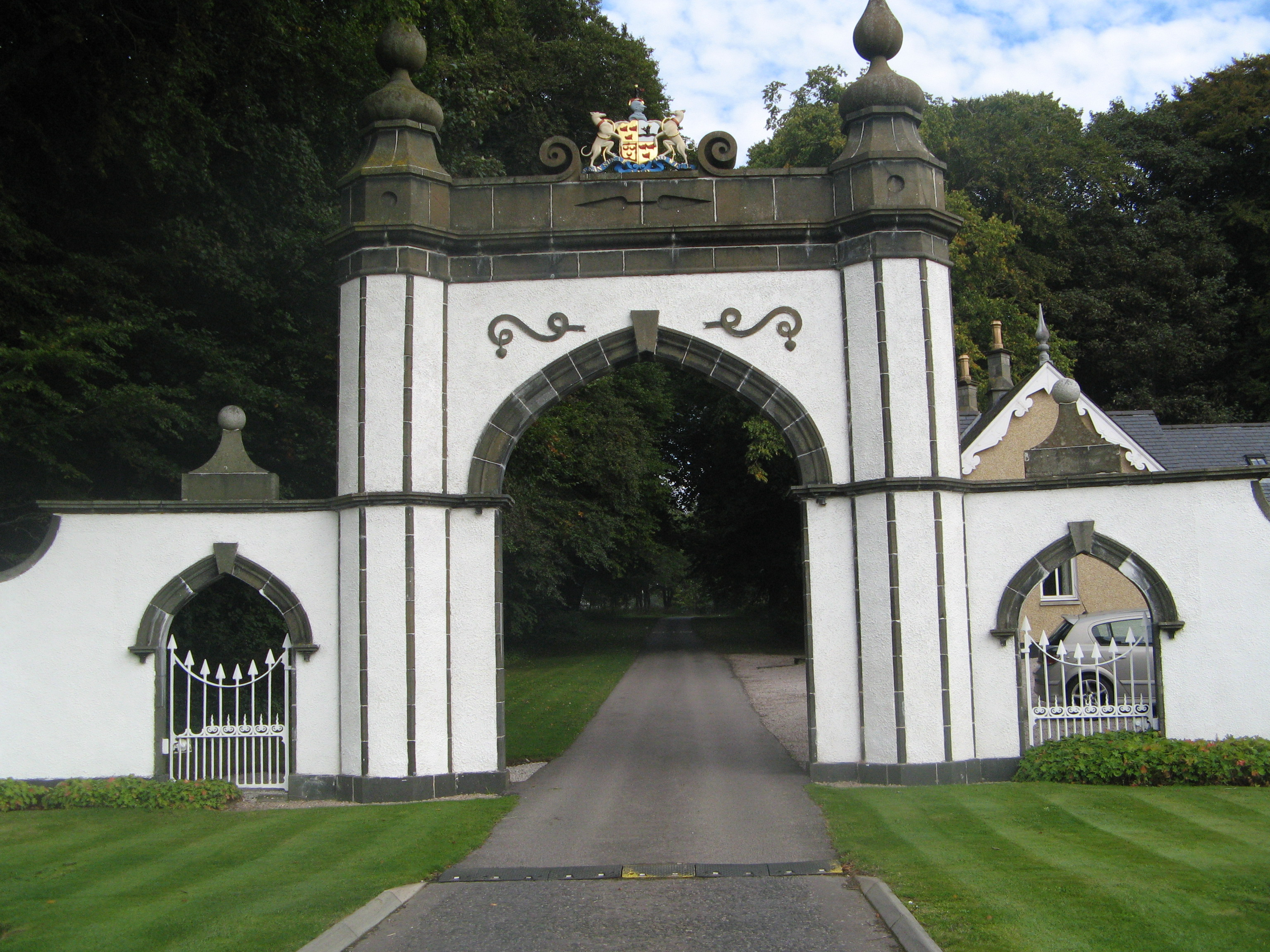
Outer gate, also pictured in 2013

== See also ==
- List of listed buildings in Aberdeenshire
