= Aberdeen University Press =

University publishing press

Aberdeen University Press (AUP) is the publishing arm of the University of Aberdeen. Launched in October 2013, AUP is built on the legacy of the defunct printing firm and publishing house of the same name, which existed from 1900 to 1996. Unlike the defunct AUP, which worked closely with the University of Aberdeen while remaining a legally separate entity, the new AUP is directly affiliated with the university. AUP's earliest progenitor was established in 1840 in Aberdeen, Scotland. It existed as a private firm, Arthur King and Co. until 1900 when the public company, Aberdeen University Press was created to acquire it. AUP's business history stayed local until 1970; then from 1970 until AUP's liquidation in 1996, the company was tossed between a number of corporate giants. For most of its existence AUP operated primarily as a printing firm; up until the 1980s, its publications list consisted of only the occasional commissioned title.

== Predecessors ==
The origins of AUP can be sought in a small short-lived printing firm founded by brothers George and Robert King, which operated between 1840 and 1850 in the city of Aberdeen. Shortly after the brothers' printing business ceased and their Diamond Street storefront became a bookstore, a third King brother, Arthur, set up his own printing venture in the city: Arthur King and Co. "Statements concerning the machinery held by King & Co. in the 1860s and later are somewhat inconsistent, but it appears that from the middle of that decade, it owned a large, double-quad platen, and two (later, three) Wharfedale machines (cylinder presses) of varying sizes."

The firm was a well-established printing house by the time Arthur's son sold Arthur King and Co. in 1872. The firm "did much jobbing work, and for many years had printed the Aberdeen Free Press and produced a great many papers, announcements and notices relating to the expansion of the railway system into the North and North-East of Scotland." The new owners were: John Thomson, former compositor and later foreman in the case room of the Aberdeen Journal, Alexander Troup, a wholesale bookseller and stationer, and a Mr. Mackenzie. Over the next fifteen years, Thomson bought out his partners, becoming sole owner of the profitable enterprise. Arthur King and Co. grew at strong clip throughout the period; the number of employees increased from 21 in 1872, to 66 in 1887, to 118 by 1894. The firm was sufficiently competitive to undertake work for metropolitan publishers, despite the distance from Aberdeen to the centers of the British publishing world: Glasgow, Edinburgh, and London.

== Emergence as AUP ==
Aberdeen University Press sprung into being in 1900, "fully formed, fully functional, and capitalised to the tune of £54,000." AUP was formed as a public company to acquire Arthur King and Co. In an illustration of the close relations between AUP and the University of Aberdeen, (Sir) William Ramsay, Professor of Humanity at the university was installed as the first chairman of the board of the company. Cross-pollination between the two entities continued when James Trail, Professor of Botany joined the board in 1907, and the University Librarian, P. J. Anderson, in 1921. John Thomson continued as a member of the corporate board until his death in 1911.

According to an 1899 internal review of Arthur King and Co. conducted to prepare the firm for its new existence as AUP, the firm's equipment holdings included 1,300 iron chasses, 10 American-built Miehle 2-revolution presses, 6 Wharfedale, and 2 jobbing machines. Besides printing equipment, AUP also inherited 3 type-casting machines and a vast collection of type; over 600 tons worth, including Russian, German, Bengali, Greek, and Hebrew. Rather than purchasing typesets as many other printers did, John Thomson had preferred the firm to maintain its own type foundry. This arrangement was beneficial for the company, as Thomson explained in an article in the British Printer in 1904: "We can cast nearly all the type we want, and at much less than the typefounders can sell it to us. Why, we gain close on 50% on the type account." World War I critically impacted this arrangement. With wartime scarcity, the price of metals increased to the point that AUP could not afford the required lead and antimony. The resultant drop in quality of AUP's type metal and increase in printing prices began to impact their customer base, as in 1917 when John Long Ltd. informed the AUP board that they could no longer place printing orders with the company.

The period between 1914 and 1920 was difficult for AUP. This was the result of two sets of factors: general industry conditions caused by World War I, increased commodity prices and the overall depression in the trade, as well as factors unique to AUP. A 1916 valuation of the company's type and machinery revealed that they had previously been vastly overstated, and much of the equipment needed to be replaced. This put the board in the embarrassing position of having to obtain agreement from the shareholding to devalue the company's shares. At the same time, AUP was also dealing with issues on the labor front. Firstly, there was the simple shortage of able-bodied men. Due to this labor shortage, though AUP was a defiantly non-union shop, the company "had got itself into an ultimately unsustainable and unsympathetic position, in that every time there was a wage increase – either a general increase, or a War Bonus – agreed between union shops, the unions themselves, and employers’ federations, the firm was obliged to match it, for fear of losing valuable and skilled staff to other printers."

== Post-WWI Period ==
Though there was optimism in the initial postwar period, for most of the 1920s business was erratic for AUP. The company had a handful of dutiful customers and seemed to have a close relationship with the John Rylands Library and the Manchester University Press, but periods of steady productivity were few and far between. AUP was not the only struggling Aberdeen-based printing company. Negotiations between AUP and the Rosemount Press ended with the decision to merge. "AUP was predominately a book and journal printer, whilst the Rosemount Press carried out considerably more jobbing and general commercial work. Complementarity, therefore, was seen as the best way to business survival."

World War II brought to AUP a cautious market and a labor vacuum. However, these conditions—the fragility of the market, scarcity of qualified labor, and the rationing of paper and metals—were felt across the entire British printing industry. Due to these conditions, profits dipped during the early years of the war. However, in 1941, the company noted that the volume of work had increased, "a considerable number of reprint orders having come in as a result of the destruction of printed stocks by recent enemy action in London." From the postwar period until 1970, AUP maintained a pattern of comfortable growth and small-scale absorptions: William Jackson Ltd. in 1950; John Avery & Co. (the Greyfriars Press), a firm of general printers, in 1953; Edmond & Spark, stationers and bookbinders, in 1966.

== Later existence ==
AUP's post-1970 existence can be read as a tale of the consolidation of the British printing industry. From 1970 until its demise, AUP was passed from corporate giant to corporate giant.

Riding the wave of consolidation, the British Bank of Commerce acquired AUP in 1970. The bank's small acquisition spree continued with Central Press Ltd. and George Cornwall and Sons Ltd. between 1970 and 1972, fully integrating each new firm with AUP. Between 1970 and 1978, AUP was acquired and sold by three investment groups: Brandt Ltd., Grindlays Holdings, and Spey Investments, before landing with Pergamon Press in January 1978. Significantly different from earlier corporate deals, AUP's acquisition by Pergamon Press meant that rather than being an anonymous object within an investment company's curio cabinet, AUP was now among family, an important piece of a conglomerate rooted in the printing and publishing industries. Iain Beavan, in his recently published history of AUP noted that "Harold Watt, as Managing Director of AUP is reliably reported to have admitted that, against a background of adverse trading conditions and rapid technological advances, AUP would not have survived had it not have been for the support of Pergamon Press and Robert Maxwell."

This support was made clear in Pergamon Press's bold plan to rehabilitate the firm: AUP's printing shop was to be vastly modernized, transferring the majority of work from hot metal typesetting and letterpress printing to photo-composition and lithographic printing, and AUP's publishing side was to be developed, with the goal of making AUP the conglomerate's signature Scottish academic and educational imprint. The modernization of AUP's printing shop meant that, while some employees were re-trained on the new machines, many more employees were laid off as their jobs were made redundant. The painfulness of this process inevitably slowed the pace of Pergamon's modernization scheme.

Unlike the modernization of AUP's printing shop, the other half of Pergamon's rehabilitation plan—the development of AUP's publishing side—proved swift and successful. In 1979 AUP published 1 title; in 1980, 3; by 1988, 38 titles. AUP's publishing arm benefited from its narrow focus on Scottish academic and scholarly titles. The publication of the Concise Scots Dictionary after its rejection by three other publishers was a point of pride for AUP; it became a best-seller at the Edinburgh International Book Festival that year.

While its acquisition by Pergamon enabled AUP to modernize and rehabilitate, these boons did not come without drawbacks. The success of AUP's publishing arm overwhelmed AUP's printing arm, to the extent that the corporate board questioned in 1989 whether AUP Publishing should look elsewhere for its own printing needs. AUP's printing arm was wracked with instability throughout the 1980s. AUP's initial acquisition by Pergamon caused discomfort among many among the Aberdeen firm's long-time customer base. AUP's neutrality and independence was in question, as it was now owned by a very real competitor to many of AUP's former clients. With local publishing houses shifting away and local artisans being laid off, AUP's links to the local Aberdeen community were becoming increasingly fraught.

Though the printing business was unstable and AUP's relationship with the Aberdeen community fraught, these were not the ultimate factors behind AUP's demise. Death was a top-down affair. In 1982, at the command of Robert Maxwell Pergamon Press was integrated into the British Printing and Communication Corporation, creating the Pergamon-BPCC Group, with the ultimate parent company being Maxwell Communications Corporation. In 1986 AUP was sold to another Maxwell company, before being re-sold back to Pergamon-BPCC. In 1991, the Pergamon Group, minus AUP, was sold to Elsevier. This left AUP tethered to the fortunes of Robert Maxwell and his publishing empire. After the death of Maxwell in November 1991, the extent of his corporation's debt was discovered. In the ensuing legal mess, AUP was liquidated in 1996.

== Resurrection ==
In October 2013, the University of Aberdeen announced the re-launch of Aberdeen University Press, as a traditional university press directly affiliated with the university. Though the new AUP is positioned by the university as the successor to the defunct printing firm and publishing house of the same name liquidated in 1996, the two publishing houses are distinct and legally separate entities; only the thread of historical narrative connects the two entities. It is unclear who owns the copyrights to the defunct AUP's backlist titles.

With the launch of the University of Aberdeen's first official university press, the administration hopes to communicate the university's research output to a wider audience while increasing institutional prestige on the global stage. The first title published was Taking Part in Music: Case Studies in Ethnomusicology, released in 2013 by the Elphinstone Institute. The next volume will be Vita Mea, the autobiography of Scottish literary scholar and Aberdeen alumnus, Sir Herbert Grierson.

== Notable books ==
- Coote, C. H. (1898). Autotype facsimiles of three mappemondes. Aberdeen: Aberdeen University Press.
- Bibliotheca Lindesiana Catalogue of the Printed Books Preserved at Haigh Hall, Wigan, 4 vols. folio, Aberdeen University Press, printers. With companion volumes for the royal proclamations and philatelic literature.
- Shuldham-Shaw, P. & Lyle, E. B., (editors) (1981-2002): The Greig-Duncan Folk Song Collection; vols. 1–8. Aberdeen University Press, Aberdeen ISBN 978-0-08-025759-4 etc.
