= Willie Kemp =

British songwriter

Willie Kemp (1888–1965) is best known as a singer and writer of Doric comic songs. His family owned a hotel in Oldmeldrum, formerly Kemp's hotel, now Morris's and at an early age Kemp started performing at the hotel. He was known as the King of the Cornkisters.

During the early 1920s, Kemp went to Art school in Aberdeen and while there, he joined a concert party. By 1923 he was invited to broadcast for the BBC in Aberdeen. An employee of the Beltona record label heard his broadcasts and he was invited to Beltona's London studios to make recordings. He continued to record with them throughout the 1930s.

The material that he recorded for Beltona was a mixture of bothy ballads, and cornkisters, some written by others, some written by himself. His musical composition skills were good, his lyric composition less so, and as a result his best work was done in collaboration with others, particularly the lyricist G Bruce Thomson with whom he wrote McFarlane o the Sprotts o Burnieboosie, The Weddin o McGinnis tae his Cross-eyed Pet and McGinty’s Meal and Ale.

== Sources ==
- A Salute to Doric Heroes
