= Mess John =

Mess John is the old epithet in Scottish ballad poetry for a priest, derived from the celebration of the mass, so that "Mess John" signified in irreverent phrase, John who celebrated the mass. The English have a kindred phrase, "Jack Priest".

"The auld folk soon gied their consent,

Syne for Mess John they quickly sent,

Wha ty'd them to their heart's content,
And now she's Lady Gowrie"
(The Lass o' Gowrie by Carolina Nairne)

"Mess John" is the title of a poem by James Hogg (The Poems of James Hogg, the Ettrick Shepherd).
