= The Greig-Duncan Folk Song Collection =

Song book from Scotland

The Greig-Duncan Folk Song Collection from northeast Scotland, was the work of the schoolmaster and musician, Gavin Greig (1856–1914), and the minister James Bruce Duncan (1848-1917). The project began in 1902 and was completed between then and the First World War. Its largest contributor was Bell Robertson. A selection of the songs was published in 1925 under the title Last Leaves of Traditional Ballads and Ballad Airs collected in Aberdeenshire by the Late Gavin Greig.

Greig and Duncan were originally criticised for including 'impure' versions of the songs, following uncritically the taste and sources of those providing the songs. Some verses were also thought indecent. This resulted in many songs being excluded from the 1925 edition and not being published until the 1980s. However Greig and Duncan's method of collecting without editing is now recognized for its soundness.

The collection as a whole was edited by Pat Shuldham-Shaw (and then Emily Lyle) following the rediscovery of Duncan's notebooks in the 1960s. As published in 1981-2002, it includes 1,933 songs in eight volumes arranged according to themes: nautical, military, historical songs, narrative songs, songs of the countryside, home, and social life, songs of courtship, songs of love, songs of parting, children's songs and rhymes. A separate selection of 150 songs was published for singers in 2009 by Dr. Katherine Campbell, concentrating on 28 singers who originally contributed to the collection.

== Bibliography ==
- Campbell, Katherine (2009): Songs from North East Scotland: A Selection for Performers from the Greig-Duncan Folk Song Collection John Donald Publishers Ltd.
- Shuldham-Shaw, P. (1973), The Greig-Duncan Folk Song Manuscripts, in Maisels, C.K. (ed.), Folk Song and the Folk Tradition, Festival issue of the New Edinburgh Review, August 73, pp. 3 - 5
- Shuldham-Shaw, P. and Lyle, E.B. (eds.) (1981-2002), The Greig-Duncan Folk Song Collection, vols. 1-8, Aberdeen University Press, Aberdeen ISBN 978-0-08-025759-4 etc.

== See also ==
- Bothy ballad
