= Bothy ballad =

Scottish folk song type

Bothy ballads are songs sung by farm labourers in the northeast region of Scotland.

Bothies are farm outbuildings, where unmarried labourers used to sleep, often in harsh conditions. In the evening, to entertain themselves, these bothy bands sang. Several Child Ballads that had died out elsewhere in the UK survived until the 1920s, sung by these workers. It was a male-only environment and some songs are obscene. They celebrated ploughmen as lovers ("The Plooman Laddies", "My Darling Ploughman Boy").

Barnyards of Delgaty
Tune for Barnyards of Delgaty

== Subjects ==
The farmlands around Aberdeen produced satirical songs, critical of working conditions. The best known is "The Barnyards of Delgaty", (a pun on "The Barren Yirds o Delgaty" meaning "The Barren Soils of Delgaty"). Real names of farmers, supervisors and farms are given, and mocked. Other satirical attacks are "Rhynie", "The Guise O Tough" and "Harrowing Time". By contrast "The Bogheid Crew" is a celebration of the fine work done by the labourers, naming each one in turn.

Some songs celebrate the countryside, including "Where The Gadie Rins", "Bonny Udny" and "Arlin's Fine Braes".

Some songs match a high-born with a servant. The most famous is "The Knight and the Shepherd's Daughter" (Child Ballad 110), recorded by Steeleye Span as "Royal Forrester". "The Laird o Dainty Doonby" is another. In 1951 Davie Stewart sang this song for American collector Alan Lomax. It is a version of a song published by David Herd in 1776, in "Ancient and Modern Scottish Songs".

Soldiers from Highland military regiments sometimes ended up working in bothies. Some ballads concern encounters between soldiers and innocent maids. "The Trooper and the Maid" (Child Ballad 299) is one. Most famous of all is "The Bonnie Lass o' Fyvie" (Pretty Peggy-O), covered by Simon and Garfunkel and many others. "The Forfar Sodger" relates to the Peninsular War (1808–1814) and was recorded as late as 1951.

== Notable recordings ==
In the mid-1960s Grampian Television produced two series of programs re-enacting the kind of songs that were sung in bothies. It was called Bothy Nichts. A tragic song might be followed by a joke or a story, then a humorous song. Only rarely would a servant girl be present at these events, and musical instruments were also rare, but they appeared on the shows.

Lomax interviewed John Strachan, Jimmy MacBeath and Davie Stewart. Hamish Henderson recorded bothy songs from Willie Scott. Bill Leader recorded Belle Stewart.

In 2012, Euan McIlwraith interviewed Jock Duncan.

== Accompaniments ==
Diddling, a form of wordless song, was often practiced as an accompaniment to a Bothy Ballad performance during intervals, before and after shows, or if performers did not show up for whatever reason. They were also performed by older family members to calm young children (bairns).

== Stewardship ==
Organisations such as the Traditional Music and Song Association help to maintain the tradition.

== Discography ==
- Bothy Ballads of Scotland by Ewan MacColl (1961)
- The Five Yokels — Bothy Nichts Volume 1 (c 1966)
- The Angus Cronies — Bothy Nichts Volume 2 (c 1966)
- Scottish Tradition 1 - Bothy Ballads: Music From the North East (various artists)
- Songs From Aberdeenshire (John Strachan) (2001)
- 1951 Edinburgh People's Festival Ceilidh (2006) (various artists)
- Go On, Another Song (Davie Stewart) (c 1970)
- Two Gentlemen of the Road (Jimmy MacBeath and Davie Stewart) (2002)
- Wild Rover No More (Jimmy MacBeath) (1967)
- There is a Man Upon a Farm - The Voice of the People vol 20 (1998) (various artists)
- In Freenship's Name (Gordeanna McCulloch) (1997)

== Podcasts ==
Scottish history podcast Stories of Scotland features bothy ballads in its first episode.

== See also ==
- Cornkister
- The Greig-Duncan Folk Song Collection
- Mess John
