= Jimmy Shand =

Scottish musician (1908-2000)

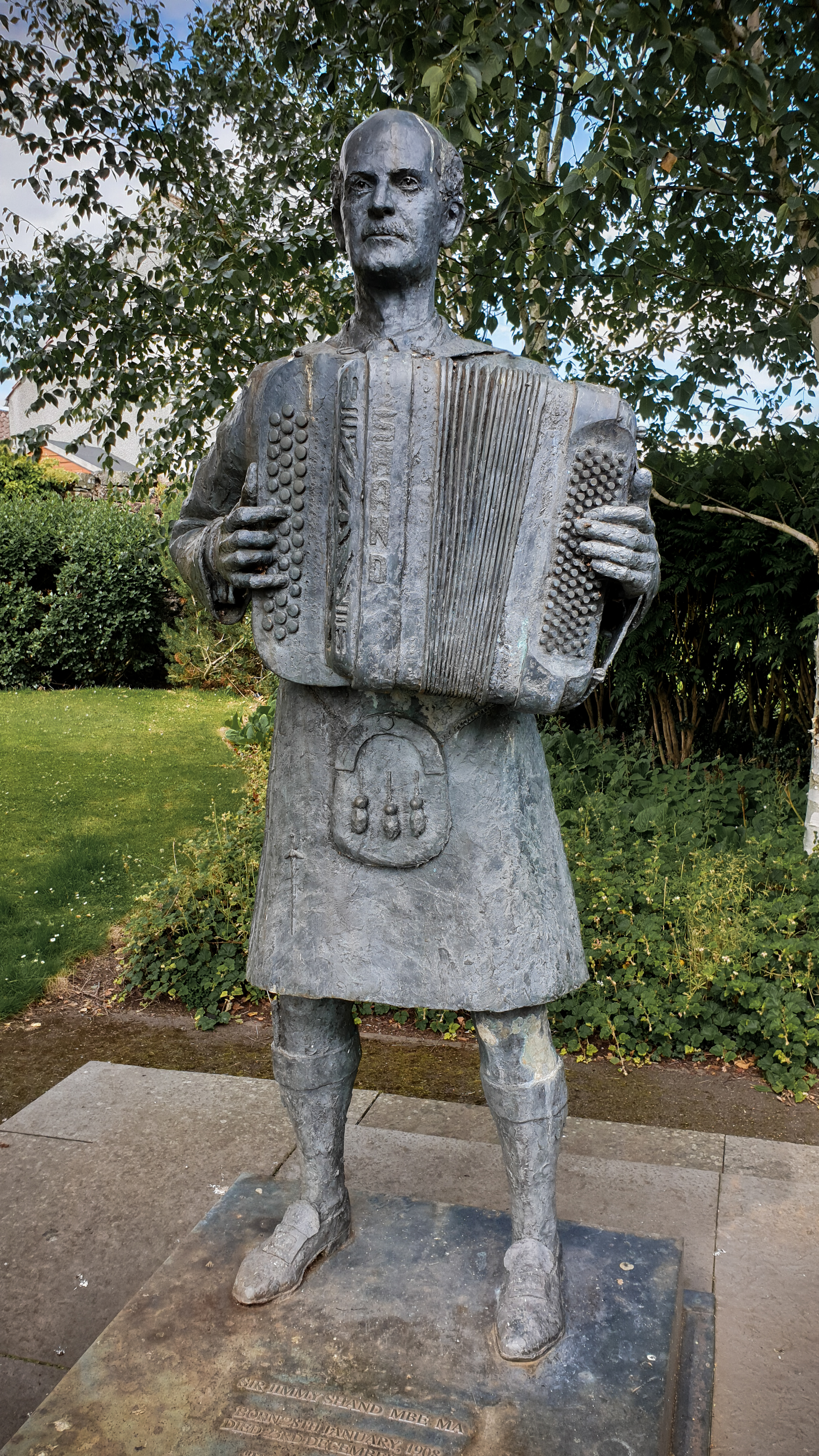
- Shand statue in Auchtermuchty

Background information
- Born: 28 January 1908; East Wemyss, Fife, Scotland
- Died: 23 December 2000 (aged 92)
- Genres: Scottish country dance Music
- Website: www.jimmyshand.com

Sir James Shand (28 January 1908 – 23 December 2000) was a Scottish musician who played traditional Scottish dance music on the accordion. His signature tune was the "Bluebell Polka".

== Life and career ==
James Shand was born in East Wemyss in Fife, Scotland, son of a farm ploughman turned coal miner and one of nine children. The family soon moved to the burgh of Auchtermuchty. The town now boasts a larger than life-sized sculpture of Shand. His father was a skilled melodeon player. Jimmy started with the mouth organ and soon played the fiddle. At the age of 14 he had to leave school and go down the mines. He played at social events and competitions. His enthusiasm for motor-bikes turned into an advantage when he played for events all round Fife. In 1926, he did benefit gigs for striking miners and was consequently prevented from returning to colliery work. One day Shand and a friend were admiring the instruments in the window of a music shop in Dundee. His friend said: "It wouldn't cost you to try one," so Shand walked in and strapped on an accordion. The owner, Charles Forbes, heard Shand play and immediately offered him a job as travelling salesman and debt-collector. He soon acquired a van and drove all over the north of Scotland. He switched to the British chromatic button accordion, an instrument he stuck with for the rest of his life.

Being a keen motorcyclist, Shand was also an enthusiastic supporter and spectator at the annual Isle of Man TT races. He also sponsored a motorcycle road racer from Errol, Perthshire called Jack Gow, a multiple Scottish Motorcycle Racing champion and later a motorcycle dealer in Dundee. Jack Gow was the son of Andy Gow who drove the bus which transported the Shand tour. Shand's interest in motorcycles began when a boyfriend of his sister had problems with his bike, which had broken down. Shand repaired it and was allowed to use it.

He failed an audition for the BBC because he kept time with his foot. At a time when gramophones were very much luxury items he made two records for the Regal Zonophone label in 1933. His career took off when he switched to making 78s for the Beltona label (1935–1940). Most of the Beltona recordings were solo, but he experimented with small bands. This boosted sales. He appeared in a promo film shown in cinemas. While the image showed his fingers moving in a blur, Shand was disappointed to hear the sound track playing a slow air. He was prevented from joining the RAF by a digestive disorder, and spent the war years in the Fire Service. On New Year's Day morning in 1945 he made his first broadcast with "Jimmy Shand and his Band". This was the first of many such BBC radio and television appearances.

== Works ==
Soon after the war he became a full-time musician, and adopted a punishing lifestyle later adopted by rock bands. He would play Inverness one night, London the next night, and still drive the van back to bed in Dundee. He took his trademark bald head, Buddy Holly spectacles and full kilted regalia, Scottish reels, jigs and strathspeys to Australia, New Zealand and North America, including Carnegie Hall in New York. Now on the EMI Parlophone label, he released a single each month in the mid-1950s, including his only top 20 hit in the UK Singles Chart – the "Bluebell Polka" (1955). It was produced by George Martin. Shand was awarded an MBE in 1962. This period is remembered affectionately by Richard Thompson, who played Shand tunes on his Henry the Human Fly and Strict Tempo! albums. Thompson's Scottish father had been a keen Shand collector. In 1991, Thompson paid tribute to Shand with an original song, "Don't Sit on My Jimmy Shands", from his 1991 album Rumor and Sigh.

Call me precious I don't mind
78s are hard to find
You just can't get the shellac since the war
This one's the Beltona brand
Finest label in the land
They don't make them like that any more.

— from "Don't Sit on My Jimmy Shands" by Richard Thompson

In 1972, Shand went into semi-retirement. From then he played only small venues in out-of-the-way places for a reduced fee. He was made a freeman of Auchtermuchty in 1974, North East Fife in 1980 and Fife in 1998. He became Sir Jimmy Shand in 1999. His portrait is in the Scottish National Gallery, close to Niel Gow. In 1983, he released a retrospective album with the cheeky title The First 50 Years. At the age of 88, he recorded an album and video with his son, Dancing with the Shands.

More than 330 compositions are credited to Jimmy Shand. He recorded more tracks than the Beatles and Elvis Presley combined. In 1985, British Rail named a locomotive Jimmy Shand. He was dissatisfied with the chromatic button accordions available on the market in the 1940s so he designed his own one. The Hohner company manufactured the "Shand Morino" until the 1970s. He is the only artist worldwide to have his name used by the Hohner company as a model name for a musical instrument. There is a biography The Jimmy Shand Story: The King of Scottish Dance Music by Ian Cameron (2001). A number of his older recordings have been re-released by Beltona Records.

Since the 1950s the crowd at Dunfermline Athletic F.C. have left the ground after the game to the sound of Shand's "Bluebell Polka".
