= Gavin Greig =

Gavin Greig (1856–1914) was a Scottish folksong collector, playwright, novelist and teacher.

He edited James Scott Skinner's biggest collection of music, The Harp and Claymore Collection, providing harmonies for Skinner's compositions, and he was jointly responsible for compiling The Greig-Duncan Folk Song Collection, with the Rev J.B. Duncan (1848–1917). A selection from this collection of over 3,000 songs and tunes was published in 1925. Two volumes were published in 1981–1982, but the full collection, in eight volumes, was only finally published between 1981 and 2002.

He was also the author of the Doric Scots play Mains Wooin', which was very popular in the North East of Scotland before World War II. His novels include Morrison Gray: or, Life in a Buchan Schoolhouse serialised in the Peterhead Sentinel between May 1896 and January 1897, The Hermit o' Gight serialised in the Buchan Observer between 1898 and 1899. and the historical romance Logie o' Buchan published in Aberdeen in 1899.

Greig was related to Robert Burns on his mother's side and to Edvard Grieg on his father's side.
