= Beltona Records =

British record label founded in 1923

- Founded: 1923
- Status: Active
- Country of origin: UK

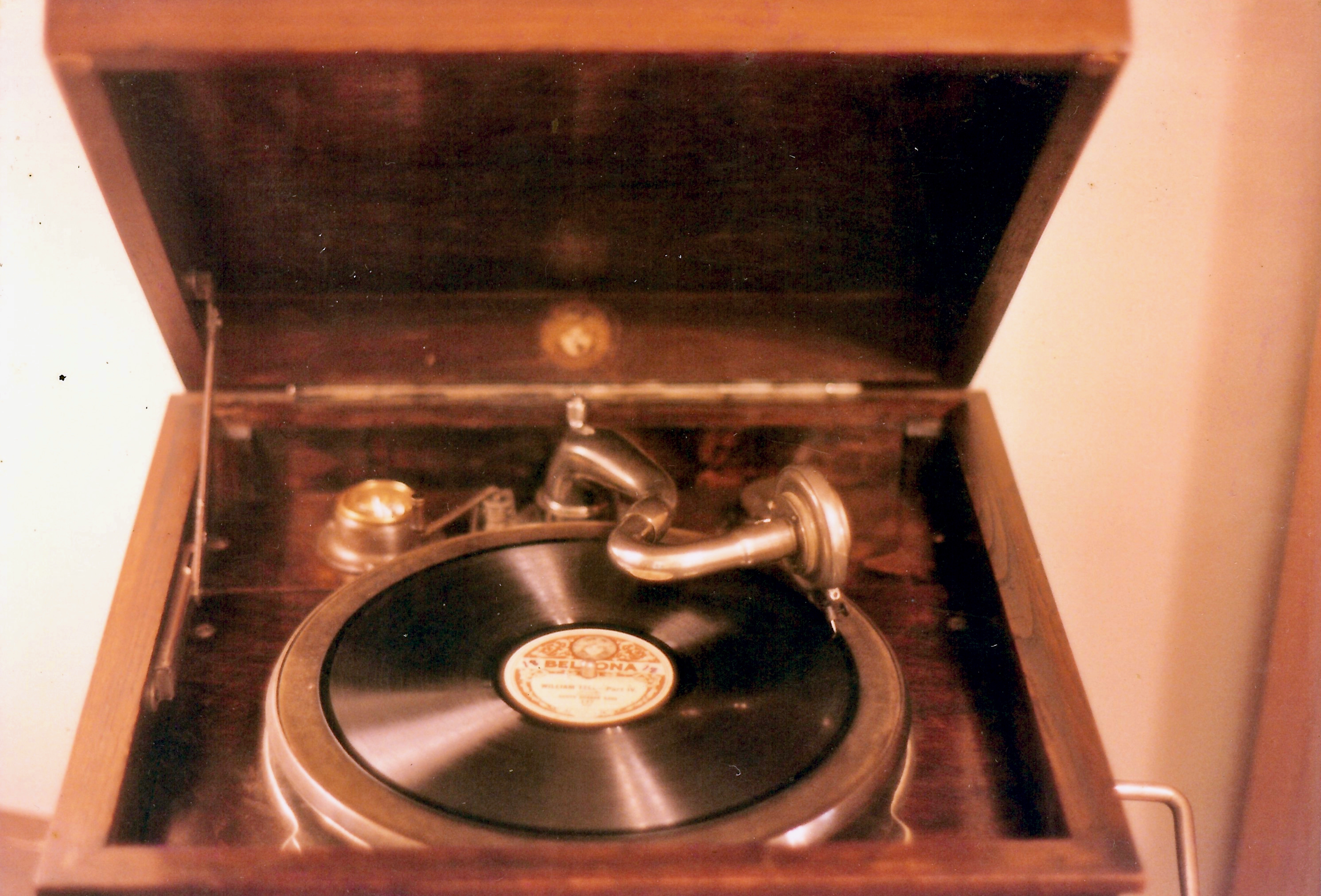
A Beltona Record being played on a Beltona Gramophone

Beltona Records is a British record label founded in 1923, producing recordings 'of a mainly Scottish interest'. The company's early history began with 78 rpm gramophone records of traditional Scottish music. They produced music common of the time, i.e. dance and barn music. Typical instrumentation included Hohner harmonicas, pianos and violins. Beltona Records is now a subsidiary of Decca Records.

The CLPGS publish a history of the label and a list of known titles in their Reference Series of books.

== See also ==
- List of record labels
- Jimmy Shand
