= Róisín Mullins =

British dancer and TV presenter

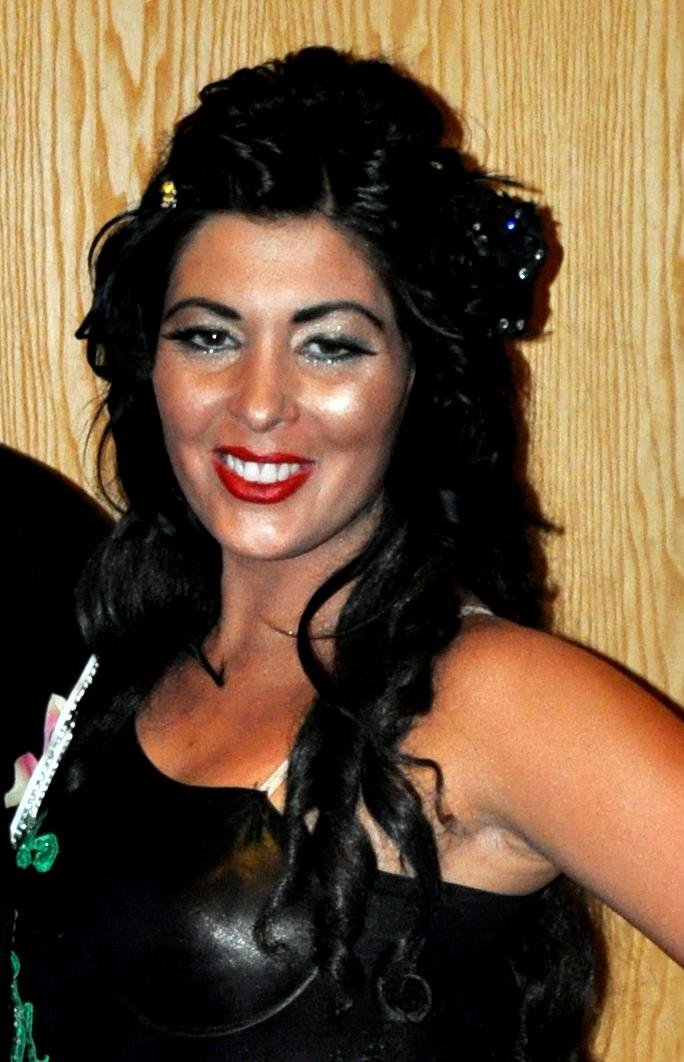
- Mullins at Pinewood studios
- Born: 6 July 1982 (age 44); West Sussex, England
- High school: BRIT School
- College: University of Surrey
Medal record
Ladies’ Irish dance
Representing England (An Coimisiún Le Rincí Gaelacha)
Oireachtas Rince na Cruinne (World Irish Dancing Championships)
Bronze medal – third place	2002	Glasgow
UK Open Irish Dance Championship
Gold medal – first place	2002	Greater London

Róisín Mullins (born 6 July 1982) is a TV presenter, TV talent show judge, professional Irish dancer, singer, stage show owner and choreographer.

== Early life ==
Mullins was born in West Sussex, England. Her paternal family originally hail from Castletownroche, County Cork, Ireland. She is of Romani descent. She began dancing at the age of four. She entered her first Irish dance competition and won her first open title on the same day, at the age of five.

Mullins trained in musical theatre, dance, singing and acting at the BRIT School from 1998 to 2000, along with the late Amy Winehouse. In 2001, Mullins, as a trained Soprano, was selected to sing at the London Palladium.

== Dance career ==
Mullins competed at both a National and World level for over fifteen years, as a solo and team dancer. In 2002 she represented England at the An Coimisiún Le Rincí Gaelacha World Irish Dancing Championships, achieving a Bronze World Medal, and is also a former An Coimisiún UK Open Irish dance Champion. Over her competitive career she won hundreds of first place awards.

In 2004 Mullins joined the cast of the Michael Flatley show Lord of the Dance for a world tour, performing alongside many of the original cast, including Bernadette Flynn and Helen Egan. She was initially placed in troupe four, but after just a few weeks in the show was promoted to Flatley's own troupe one.

From 2005 to 2008, Mullins studied dance as a scholarship student at the University of Surrey, where she also lectured as an associate tutor in dance, and received tuition from Royal Ballet principal Jennifer Jackson, and Cats (musical) lead Patrick Wood. Mullins was additionally trained in acting and presenting in London by former RADA principal and TV and Film acting coach Dee Cannon, and by BBC presenter and Film acting coach, Mel Churcher (coach to James Bond's Daniel Craig).

Whilst studying at the University of Surrey in 2007, Mullins, with her partner Jack, founded the all-female Irish dance troupe 'Raven', and began rehearsing at Dance Attic studios in London. The troupe was founded with the aim of fore-fronting women in the traditionally male dominated world of Irish show dance, and to offer professional Irish dancers performance opportunities between touring shows Raven have since performed at hundreds of celebrity events, balls and TV shows throughout the UK and Ireland, and featured on dozens of TV shows for Sky, ITV, and the BBC. They have performed at venues such as ExCel London, London Olympia, Fountain studios (Wembley), Pinewood Studios (Teddington and Shepperton), Birmingham NEC, O2 Arena, and throughout London's Park Lane. For one of Raven's performances in 2008, they were chosen to perform alongside Des O'Connor and Bobby Davro at a celebrity event. In 2009 they performed at the Macmillan "In Their Shoes" ball, alongside Strictly Come Dancing professional Kristina Rihanoff. In 2010 they joined 'Strictly' professionals Vincent Simone and Flavia Cacace on their "Fantasia Tour." In March 2011, Mullins began touring her own Irish dance stage show with Raven in London, entitled "Raven Dance," premiering at the "Broadway Theatre" London. In June 2016, Mullins established a second branch of the Raven Irish Dance troupe, permanently based in Cork, and began rehearsals at the Firkin Crane dance centre. The troupe have represented national charities such as Macmillan Cancer Support and Cancer Research UK, and have featured in magazines such as The Big Issue, Dance Dynamic Magazine, Dancing in the UK, Closer, Irish Dancing Magazine and in national newspapers such as the Independent, the Irish Post, Express, and The Sun.

In 2010 Mullins was partnered with Declan Donnelly dancing on Ant and Dec's ITV1 game show 'Push the Button', backed by Raven, and filmed at Pinewood Studios, Shepperton.

In 2012, Mullins and the Raven Irish dance troupe appeared dancing alongside Louis Walsh and Keith Lemon on ITV1's 'LemonAid', in a game entitled 'Lemon Drops', filmed at Pinewood studios, Teddington.

In July 2014 Mullins was announced as the primary judge, founder and organiser for the inaugural World Gypsy Dance Championships, hosted in London. The World Gypsy Dance Championships is open to dancers performing styles from the Gypsy, Roma and Traveller community, worldwide. Championship entrants compete in a variety of traditional and modern dance forms, including Stepdance, Irish dancing, and Flamenco. Podium finalists are awarded Gold, Silver or Bronze world medals, with the overall winner holding the title of World Gypsy Dance Champion for that year. In July 2014 Mullins was interviewed about the competition at RTÉ studios in Dublin, by RTÉ presenter Derek Mooney and All Ireland Talent Show judge Bláthnaid Ní Chofaigh.

In November 2016, Mullins and a troupe of Irish dancers performed for the opening of a Louis Walsh themed special episode of the X Factor, entitled Louis Loves. The troupe performed a Riverdance themed routine with Mullins partnering judge Louis, whilst on stage with judges Simon Cowell, Sharon Osbourne, and Nicole Scherzinger. Filming took place at Fountain Studios in Wembley. Later in the episode Mullins, accompanied by presenter Dermot O'Leary and backed by four Raven dancers, also presents Louis with a lifetime achievement award for judging the greatest number of X Factor shows, beating Simon Cowell by 356 to 291. Both routines were choreographed by MullinsMullins, in collaboration with members of the X Factor choreography team led by Brian Friedman. The dance costume forMullins featured on the show was designed and created by X Factor costume stylist Laury Smith, who has designed for stars such as Lady GaGa and Britney Spears. Mullins also co-choreographed, with Xtra Factor's chief choreographer James Collins, an Irish dance inspired routine for the Xtra Factor. The piece was aired live on the same day, filmed at Fountain Studios, and performed by presenters Rylan Clark and Matt Edmondson to a live rendition of C'est la Vie provided by Keavy Lynch from girl band B*Witched.

In 2017, Mullins was invited to become a judge on UK singing competition TeenStar, which had additionally begun auditioning dancers. The competition is aired on Sky Showcase TV (Sky channel 212). Previous judges have included TV vocal coach CeCe Sammy, Atomic Kitten's Liz McClarnon, and Another Level member Dane Bowers.

On 31 October 2018, Mullins featured on series 14, episode 5, of BBC TV show The Apprentice, with Sir Alan Sugar. Backed by professional Irish dancers from her Troupe Raven, she gave a short performance, before teaching the contestants an Irish Jig, as part of their reward for winning that week's task. The section was filmed at Pineapple Dance Studios.

== TV work ==
In 2011, Mullins partnered Paddy McGuinness dancing in a pilot for his game show 'Walk the Line', backed by Raven, and filmed at the O2 Arena in London.

In 2011 Mullins was selected to be a judge on the panel of 'Travellers Got Talent', a National Gypsy and Traveller talent contest, also judged by Romany pop star Jentina. The competition was filmed for an eight part series for Sky entitled 'A Gypsy life for Me'. During the series Mullins was contracted to feature more prominently in the show, eventually leading to her being signed as a presenter and judge for a further eight part series for Sky. 'A Gypsy Life for Me' season two was subsequently centred on Mullins, and her co-judges Jentina and singer David Essex, in a new competition searching England and the Republic of Ireland for the 'Gypsy and Traveller Face of the Year 2012'. In 2012 Mullins was interviewed about the show in Dublin by Sinéad Desmond and Mark Cagney for TV3's 'Ireland AM'. Season two of 'A Gypsy Life for Me' began airing on Sky from May 2013.

From 2011 to 2016 Mullins has annually been on the judging panel of UK talent show 'Britain Does Variety', alongside judges such as Channel 5 presenter Dave Payne, CBBC's Naomi Wilkinson, and EastEnders' Emma Barton. The competition is aired on Sky Showcase TV (Sky channel 212).

In September 2017, Mullins featured in Season two of Gypsy Kids: Our Secret World for Channel 5. At the funeral of Simon Doherty, father of TV celebrity and bare-knuckle boxer Paddy Doherty (TV personality), Mullins paid tribute to the 'Father of all Travellers', giving a commemorative speech, singing a traditional Irish song, 'The Fields of Athenry', and performing a traditional Irish dance alongside four members of the Raven Irish Dance troupe. The service took place at St Michael's Catholic Church, Ashtead, Surrey, in April 2017, with hundreds of Travellers in attendance, and a cavalcade of twenty rolls Royces.

== Personal life ==
In July 2016, Mullins married Irish stageshow producer Jack Jacobs in Cork.

== Competitive titles ==
- Bronze World Medal, Oireachtas Rince Na Cruinne (World Irish Dancing Championships), An Coimisiún le Rincí Gaelacha, 2002
- Open Irish dance Champion, UK, An Coimisiún le Rincí Gaelacha, 2002
