= Festival Irish Dancing =

Type of dance

Festival Irish Dancing is one of the oldest communities of Irish dancing, emerging when Irish folk dancing was added to musical festivals in the late 1920s in Northern Ireland. Most Festival Irish Dancing schools belong to the Festival Dance Teacher's Association, but some are independent. Educational establishments and youth organisations also participate in Festival Irish Dancing competitions. The Festival Irish Dancing community is found mainly in the eastern part of Ulster. Although commonly known as Festival Irish Dancing, Irish Folk Dancing is the original name for the genre of Irish dancing that is performed by those within the festival community of Irish dancing. This term was coined by folk revivalists in the 1920s to denote country dances and step dances that were popular during the 1800s.

== History ==
During the 1920s, folk revivalists, such as the Lambeg Irish Folk Dancing Society, researched and practised country dances in an attempt to save old dances in Ulster. This was part of a wider, global folk dancing movement led by folk culture enthusiasts such as Cecil Sharp. As part of this movement, Irish folk dancing was incorporated into the Girl Guides in the mid-1920s and was then added to the syllabus of musical festivals, starting with Larne Musical Festival in 1928 and followed by the Ballymena and Portadown musical festivals in 1929.

Belfast Dance Master Peadar O'Rafferty introduced the Gaelic League's style of Irish dancing to many Unionist communities in the newly partitioned Northern Ireland. Such communities may have already known the traditional quadrilles and step dances in a more rustic form.

The Gaelic League

In the early 20th century the Gaelic League set about finding true Gaelic dances and introduced them in a competitive context at regional feiseanna. One of the most famous feiseanna in Ulster was the Feis na nGleann, which opened in 1904.

By 1930, the Gaelic League had established a commission to review Irish dancing. This commission would become known as An Coimisiún Le Rincí Gaelacha (CLRG) and it set about standardising and promoting traditional Irish dancing throughout the 1930s.

Despite the Gaelic League's determination to stamp out any foreign forms of dance, the dances selected by them comprised Irish, Scottish and pan-European influences, whilst the music was primarily of Irish and Scottish origin. Today, the Gaelic League's form of Irish dancing has become known within the Festival Irish Dancing community as the 'Feis' style of Irish dancing. Up until the 1980s, few Irish dancing pupils would have been aware that there were two traditions of Irish dancing. Differences in appearance today have brought attention to the existence of the festival movement.

Peadar O'Rafferty

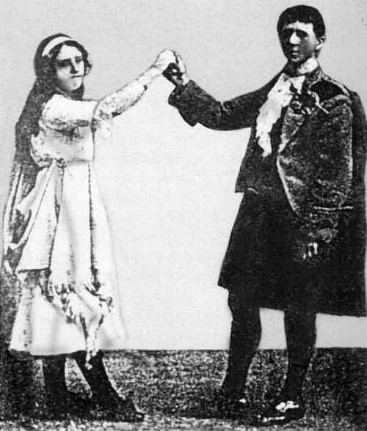
Marie MacStocker and Peadar O’Rafferty – circa 1910

The Irish folk dancing movement in the 1920s largely followed the Gaelic League's preferences, adapting old rustic quadrilles and country dances into a more refined style. The Irish folk dancing movement also adopted the Gaelic League's step (solo) dances. This was down to the influence of Belfast Dance Master, Peadar O'Rafferty.

When Irish folk revivalists were researching country dances in the 1920s, they often crossed paths with the Gaelic League. Peadar O'Rafferty, a Belfast Feis champion from the early 1900s, bridged the feis and festival movements and recorded old dances that were still alive in the countryside in his 1934 publication Irish folk Dance Book I. Peadar O'Rafferty has been overlooked in history books, though Angeline King provided a full chapter on his work in Irish Dancing: The Festival Story. His greatest contribution to Irish culture was to bring Irish dancing to the heart of Protestant communities.

Musical Festivals

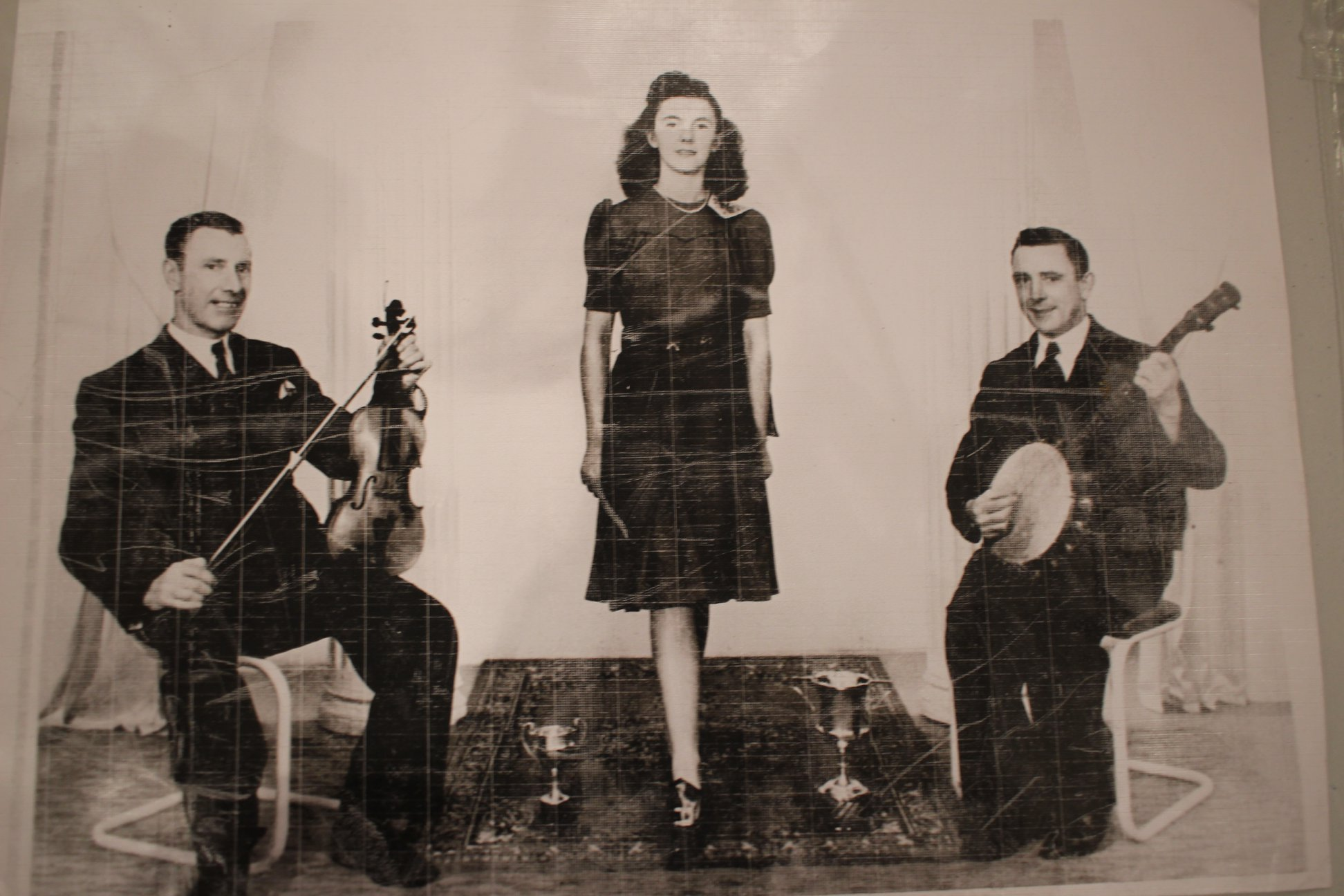

During the 1930s, Irish Folk Dancing became the most popular competition at musical festivals as hundreds of girls and boys began to attend Irish dancing classes. Up until 1948, it was possible for "musical festival dancers" to enter feiseanna and for "feis dancers" to enter musical festivals. Rules soon came into play which meant that dancing teachers registered with An Coimisiún Le Rincí Gaelacha were not permitted to send their dancers to musical festivals. The Commission did not approve of the British symbolism at such festivals. It also became necessary for Irish dancing teachers to be registered with the Commission before entering their pupils into the feiseanna. The musical festivals have since inception been "open" festivals, which means they are open to any entrant. Youth groups such as the Girl Guides, Girls Brigades, Scouts and educational establishments also enter these festivals. The British national anthem would have been played at the end of musical festivals up until the 1980s.

Stella and Patricia Mulholland One Irish dancing school closely associated with musical festivals in the late 1920s and early 1930s was the Mulholland School, led by Belfast Dance Mistress Stella Mulholland, a former pupil of Peadar O'Rafferty. This school thrived in "non-nationalist" communities as well as in nationalist communities, attracting Protestants and Catholics in almost equal numbers. Among the Mulholland School pupils who went on to become national champions in the 1940s were Betty Lewis and Yvonne Hood, both Protestants from Larne. Stella Mulholland opened a school in Larne at the British Legion in 1931.

Patricia Mulholland, who was also a much respected violinist at musical festivals, took over her sister's Irish dancing school in 1936, and continued to send pupils to both festivals and feiseanna until 1951.

There were some challenges with regard to Commission rules and in 1951, she was suspended from teaching by CLRG for six months after participating in an event at which the British national anthem was played.

Patricia Mulholland had succeeded Peadar O'Rafferty as the Girl Guides instructor and had taken a group of Girl Guides to the Festival of Britain the same year. Due to a conflict of interest in this regard, she decided to leave CLRG. This is often seen by observers as the point at which schools with a festival focus and schools with a feis focus began to diverge in style, the festival schools retaining the O'Rafferty and Mulholland traditions, the feis schools modernising apace in a global setting.

Patricia Mulholland continued to enter her pupils into musical festival Irish Folk Dancing competitions, and she also set up an Irish ballet company. Miss Mulholland's theatre ballets were choreographed with Irish steps and accompanied by traditional Irish music.

Miss Mulholland, alongside former pupils who had become Irish dancing teachers, established a regional competition called the Northern Ireland Irish Dancing Championships in 1958. The Northern Ireland Championships is the official championships for champions from the open festivals, most of which are musical festivals.

Festival Irish Dancing lineage

In addition to Patricia Mulholland, O'Rafferty pupils Veronica Convery and Agnes McConnell were key to the development of Irish dancing at musical festivals. Indeed, most Festival Irish Dancing Schools can trace their dancing lineage back to the Mulholland sisters, Veronica Convery or Agnes McConnell.

FDTA founder Marjorie Gardiner from Larne was both an O'Rafferty and Mulholland pupil in the early 1930s. She set up a school in 1936 and taught Irish dancing within the festival community for more than sixty years, creating a long festival lineage of Irish dancing in Larne through pupils like Bridie Kemp, Moira Metson and Nancy Hooper.

Betty Greer, who ran an Irish Dancing School in Ballyclare for more than sixty years, was a pupil of Veronica Convery in Ballymena in the 1930s. When she set up her own school after the Second World War, she remained friends with Alice McAleer from the Convery School. By the 1950s, the Convery School dancers were no longer dancing at musical festivals. Betty would often meet Alice McAleer to learn the latest feis techniques, but her style of dancing was traditional.

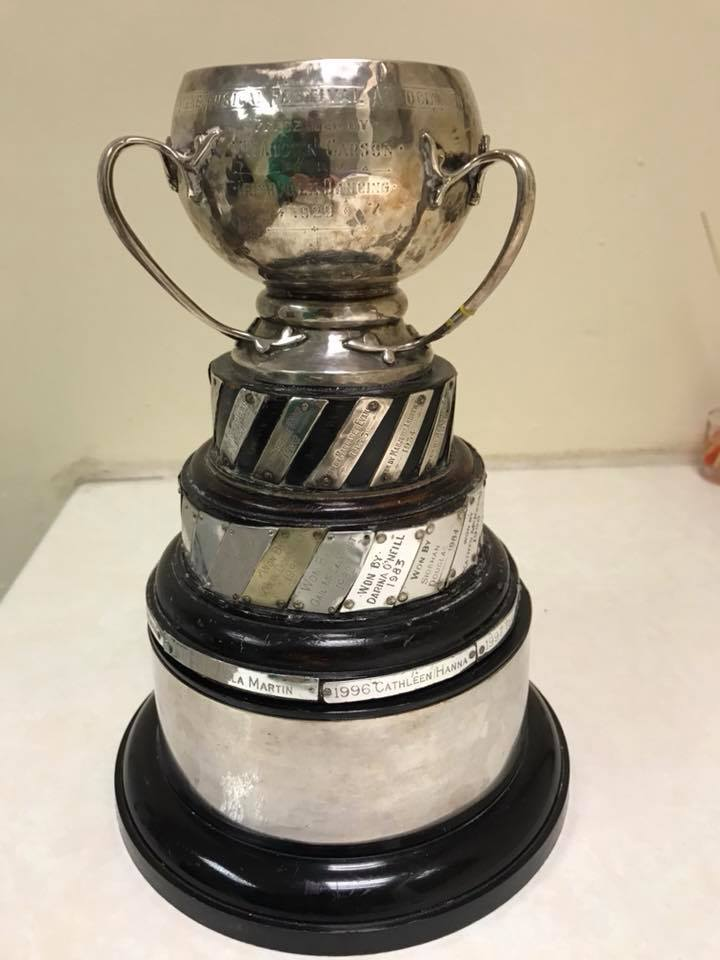

Maureen McCann, who was taught by Patricia Mulholland in the 1930s was influential in bringing Irish folk dancing to Bangor, setting up a festival there in 1955. She taught Lilias O'Reilly for a short while before she retired. Lilias went on to dance with Patricia Mulholland and runs the Reilly School today.

Irene McCann, a pupil of Yvonne Hood, also from the Patricia Mulholland line, was instrumental in keeping the festival tradition alive in Portadown from the 1960s onwards.

Many dance teachers in Ballymena and north Antrim can trace their Irish dancing lineage back to the McConnell family from Ballymena. Agnes' pupils competed at the very first festivals in 1928 and 1929. Sadie Bell was a pupil and cousin of Sally McCarley, who had danced for Agnes McConnell in the 1930s. Sadie set up her dancing school in the Carnaughts Elementary School in the late 1940s, but moved into Ballymena, where she opened the Seven Towers School at the local Protestant Hall. Today, Seven Towers School of Irish Dancing is the oldest of the Festival Irish Dancing schools.

Jean Tennant, who set up a festival in Ballymoney, was taught by Fred McConnell, Agnes' younger brother. Jean taught dancers such as Marlene Oliver, Edwina Milliken and Dominic Graham, who all went on to run their own festival schools.

Festival Dance Teacher's Association

By 1970, the Festival Irish Dancing community was large in number with a strong network of teachers, dancers and musicians. Local festivals were already attracting around 1,500 dancers in the 1950s. By the mid 1970s, that number had increased to around 2,400. Since the first Irish folk dancing festival in Larne in 1928, a collective committee for festivals had never been organised. This was mainly due to the fact that each musical festival had its own local committee.

There had been a general upsurge an in the number of Festival Irish Dancing teachers and pupils after the Second World War, with the likes of Betty Greer, Moira Metson, Bridie Kemp, Maureen McCann, Sheila Fitzpatrick, Lily Agnew, Norman Maternaghan, Nancy Hooper and Jean Tennant setting up Irish Dancing schools across the province.

In 1971, a "feis" Irish dancing teaching body called An Comhdháil broke away from the Gaelic League's Commission. Festival Irish Dancing teachers Sadie Bell, Marjorie Gardiner and Paddy Mulrine, who had all participated in feiseanna in their youth, were invited to an Irish dancing meeting at the International Hotel in Belfast. They decided not to join An Comhdháil, but instead would set up their own organisation, the Festival Dance Teacher's Association. The FDTA festivals were initially known as "Nine Glens" festivals. A Nine Glens regional championship competition was also established. This was renamed the "Ulster Championships" in 1986. Patricia Mulholland did not join this organisation.

The festival tradition of Irish dancing today, therefore, has two main regional festivals: the FDTA Ulster Championships and the Northern Ireland Championships. With the exception of a few independent schools, the same dancers can be found at both festivals.

In the beginning, a few of the Irish dancing schools remained independent from the FDTA but continued to enter competitions at the open musical festivals. Today, the majority of Festival Irish Dancing Schools belong to the FDTA.

The festival tradition of Irish dancing is unique in that it has attracted tens of thousands of dancers from Protestant backgrounds since the 1920s, even during the period of conflict known as The Troubles, when Irish culture was sometimes shunned in Protestant communities. The Festival dance community remains strongly cross-community in nature.

== Style ==
There are stylistic differences between Festival Irish dancing and Feis Irish Dancing. In addition to learning traditional dances, Festival Irish dancers are permitted a degree of individualism in performance. Storytelling is encouraged and proponents highlight the "art and personal expression" involved. Set dances, (Note: "Set dance", in this context, refers to a solo Irish dance which is danced to a specified tune, and should not be confused with set dancing, a style of group Irish dance.) which are standardised by An Coimisiún and other Irish dancing organisations, are learned by Festival Irish dancers too. More experienced dancers, however, sometimes compose their own set dances.

Festival Irish dancers have retained some semblance of the traditional Irish Folk Dancing ethos in terms of costume. They have not adopted the highly embellished costumes that became prominent in Feis Irish Dancing communities in the 1990s. Wigs are strictly prohibited, unless for medical reasons. Makeup is more subtle among female dancers, while fake tan is not prohibited, particularly on children, who wear white socks. Senior dancers wear tights and long sleeves. Costumes for girls are typically free-flowing velvet dresses, which create a perception of fluid movement in the style of the dance. Hard shoes are worn which resemble those of stepdancers, but soft shoes are made of leather or canvas. The dancers do not wear the ghillies common in Scottish Dancing and Feis Irish Dancing.

== Organisation ==
The Festival Dance Teachers Association (FDTA) promotes and coordinates most Irish festival dancing schools in Northern Ireland. The FDTA describes the Ulster Championships as its most significant competition. Competitions are held for both solo and team dances.

The Festival Irish Dance Teachers Association (F.I.D.T,A.) promotes and teaches Festival Irish Dancing in Somerset, U.K. The Association was formed by Catherine Bartlett in 2000. They have welcomed schools from Northern Ireland to their Irish Dance competitions in Somerset alongside other styles and Associations. They have hosted The European Championship giving dancers from Northern Ireland the opportunity to compete against the rest of the world whilst maintaining Festival style and traditions.

== Definitions ==
Irish Dancing: This is a twentieth century collective term for traditional solo dances and social dances that were popular in Ireland during the nineteenth century or that were developed in the early 1900s according to the Gaelic League’s research of Gaelic culture. Many of the dances have pan-European, Scottish and British roots and they are accompanied mainly by Irish and Scottish airs. The positioning of arms in solo Irish dancing is inspired by the style in the province of Munster in the early 1900s and the carriage is based on the Parisian style imported by dance masters of the late eighteenth and early nineteenth centuries. The steps comprise balletic steps brought by the dance masters in the 1700s and 1800s, rustic steps that were found in country dances of the seventeenth century and new steps developed throughout recent decades.

Irish Folk Dancing: Irish folk dancing is the genre of Irish dancing that is performed by those in the festival community of Irish dancing. The term was used by folk revivalists in the 1920s to denote traditional dances common to the country people of Ulster. Folk revivalists researched country dances and often crossed paths with the Gaelic League whilst collecting them. Irish folk dancing, which was influenced by dance master, Peadar O’Rafferty, who had danced at the earliest feiseanna in Belfast, was once largely the same as dancing found in the feis community. Although originally Irish folk dancers adopted the arm positioning of the Munster style, they developed their own unique regional Ulster style that is best demonstrated in the slow set dances and the slip jig. The term, ‘Irish folk dancing,’ is applied mainly to folk dancing associations, but the genre of dancing is known simply as ‘Irish dancing.’ Increasingly today, people refer to it as festival Irish dancing, but this is a reference to a community rather than a genre of dance.

Feis Irish Dancers: This is a large, global community that emerged from the feiseanna of the early 1900s when ‘Gaelic dances’ were first added to the syllabus. An Coimisiún le Rincí Gaelacha standardised and controlled the genre of Irish dancing found at feiseanna from 1930. The feis tradition largely retained its traditional style until the 1980s, but it has evolved rapidly in style and in appearance. Today the feis community is splintered into several governing bodies.

Festival Irish Dancers: This is a small, regional community that emerged when Irish folk dancing was added to musical festivals in the late 1920s in Northern Ireland. The folk dancers performed country dances that they had researched during tours of the countryside, but they also adopted the Gaelic League’s step dance and team dance routines. Most festival dance schools belong to the Festival Dance Teacher’s Association, but some are independent. Irish dancing of the festival tradition has evolved slowly in style and in appearance since the 1980s. The musical festivals, FDTA festivals and independent festivals have always attracted a balanced mix of Protestant and Catholic dancers, usually in line with the demographics of the particular area.

Step Dancing: Step dances are dances comprising multiple, often sophisticated, steps. The term most frequently denotes percussive stepping in hard shoes, but it can also apply to solo dances performed in soft pumps. Few people who dance in the festival tradition use the term ‘step dancing.’ Instead, dances are divided into ‘solo dances’ and ‘team dances’. Solo dances are divided into ‘light’ and ‘heavy’ dances, depending on whether pumps or hard shoes are worn.

Set Dancing: Set dancing is the term that defines the social fireside dances based on the quadrille. These dances were highly popular in the nineteenth century right across Ireland. The quadrille was initially deemed foreign by the Gaelic League, but it was revived in the 1970s. Dances based on the quadrille are also known as old-time dances in Ulster. They include ‘The Lancers’ and ‘The Caledonians.’

A Set Dance: This is a solo heavy dance set to original music and usually performed by experienced, competitive dancers. ‘St. Patrick’s Day,’ ‘The Garden of Daisies,’ ‘The Job of Journeywork,’ ‘The Blackbird,’ ‘Jockey to the Fair,’ are all set dances that date back to the 1800s. Irish dancers in the festival community dance these traditional set dances and also choreograph their own original set dances.
