= Oireachtas (Irish dance) =

Competitive Irish dancing event

In modern competitive Irish dance, an oireachtas (English: /ˈɛrəktəs/ ERR-ək-təs, Irish: [ˈɛɾʲaxt̪ˠəsˠ]; plural: oireachtais) refers to an annual championship competition. Oireachtais are held by several Irish dance organisations globally, including An Coimisiún Le Rincí Gaelacha, An Comhdhail na Múinteoirí le Rincí Gaelacha, the World Irish Dance Association, and others. Many oireachtais include both solo and ceilí (team) events. The competitions vary in size, duration, and level of eligibility.

== History ==
The word oireachtas means in "assembly" in the Irish language, and comes from the Old Irish airech, meaning "nobleman". While the phrase can be used to refer to any cultural festival or gathering, as well as to the Irish legislature, in Irish dancing it has come to refer to major top-level competitions, and is often casually translated as "championship".

Oireachtas was being used to refer to a large competition by the end of the 19th century, particularly the competitions organised in the Dublin area. With the formation of An Coimisíun in 1930, these championships took on extra significance for dancers registered with the organisation, and, after their first Oireachtas Rince na Cruinne (World Championships) in 1970, many oireachtais became qualifying events for the Worlds.

== Competition structure ==
=== Solo competition ===
Dancers competing at oireachtais in solo events generally must achieve a certain level of competency to be eligible for the competition. What this means varies depending on which organisation is running the Oireachtas, and in some cases which region the dancer is in. Some regions and organisations have very specific requirements, while sometimes eligibility is left to the discretion of the teacher. Local feiseanna are used to practice dances that are to be performed at an oireachtas.

The solo competitions at an oireachtas are divided by gender and age. At larger competitions, there is typically an age group for each year of birth, from the 7 or 8 years age group up to the age of about 20. At An Coimisiún events, the 20 and over age group is usually the most senior, whereas the World Irish Dancing Association offers age groups up to 60 and over.

Dances and music at an oireachtas competition
Round	Shoe	Music	Music length	Dancers on stage
1 ("Heavy round")	Heavy/hard	Jig Hornpipe	48 bars 40 bars	2 or 3
2 ("Light round")	Light/soft	Reel Slip jig (females only)	48 bars 40 bars	2 or 3
3 ("Set dance")	Heavy/hard	Hornpipe if jig danced round 1 or vice versa	Varies	1

There are three rounds in oireachtas solo competitions. There is a light shoe round, a hard shoe round, and a recall round. The order of the light shoe and hard shoe rounds are variable, depending on the competition. For the light shoe round, boys dance 48 bars of a reel, but girls' competitions may require either a reel or a slip jig depending on the age group. In case of a slip jig, only 40 bars are danced. The possible dances for the hard shoe round for both girls' and boys' competitions are treble jig and hornpipe. Once again, the required hard shoe dance for each year is determined by age group. For girls, reel and hornpipe generally coincide in any given year, and hence slip jig and treble jig coincide. For treble jig, the dancer is required to perform 48 bars; for hornpipe, the standard is 40 bars.

Rounds for most age groups are performed 2 dancers at a time, but now it is customary for younger age groups to dance 3 at a time in the larger regions.

The organizing committee can choose to judge the competitions one of two ways. Either each round is judged by a different panel of three judges (so start-to-finish, nine adjudicators) or a set panel of five judges, that judge all three rounds. The large panel of seven judges and rotating panels of five judges are reserved for the World Championships, only. After all the dancers in the competition have performed their first two rounds, the scores are tabulated. Approximately half the competition will receive a "recall" to dance their third round. The third round is a non-traditional set dance (for dancers in U8 and U9 a traditional set is required in lieu of a non-traditional set). The set dances are performed one at a time.

After all three rounds are completed, the scores are tabulated. Usually the results are announced in a large ceremony at the end of the day's events. The qualifiers for the world championships are determined as follows: In a single year age group, 5 dancers are qualified for the first 20 dancers, then one more is qualified for every 10 dancers there are beyond the first 20. In double or more year age groups, 7 dancers are qualified for the first 20, then one more for every 10 dancers after that. In addition, any World medal holder is automatically re-qualified for the World Championship the following year, so the age group receives one additional qualifying spot for every medal holder While the majority of the competitions in the Oireachtas are solo events, schools can also bring teams to compete in eight-hand dance, figure choreography, and dance drama competitions. Competition at the Oireachtas is sufficient to qualify the team to compete at the World Championships.

Adults may compete in the Oireachtas in Adult Ceili events, there are usually no solo adult competitions at this level. Additionally, adult ceili teams cannot qualify for the World Championships, though they may compete at the North American Nationals. Adult, in Irish Dance terms, is someone who started Irish Dancing at age 18 or older, or a former dancer who has taken more than 5 years off, with no Irish dance competitions or formal training during that time.

=== North America ===
In North America, Oireachtas are qualifying events for the World Championships. Each dancer must compete in the Oireachtas of his or her geographical region. There are seven competition regions in North America: New England, Eastern (Mid-Atlantic), Mid-America (Midwest), Southern, Western United States, Eastern Canada, and Western Canada. These regions are overseen by the Irish Dance Teachers' Association of North America (IDTANA), which is under the auspices of An Coimisiún le Rinci Gaelacha (CLRG), the (international) Irish dance commission. Each region has its own officers, who contribute to organizing the Oireachtas. Usually each region's Oireachtas moves annually to different cities around the region, and area schools will serve as "hosts." Teachers and parent volunteers from host schools will typically set up and tear down stages, register dancers and man the stages, run the tabulation and results rooms, and do other various tasks to keep the competition running smoothly. Depending on the size of the region, Oireachtas events may last one to four days. The competitions are usually held in November or December (often during American Thanksgiving Weekend for U.S.A/Mexico regions), and qualify dancers for the Oireachtas Rince na Cruinne of the following year (usually held during Holy Week).
