= Oireachtas Rince na Cruinne =

Annual Irish stepdance competition

Irish Dancing World Championships Oireachtas Rince na Cruinne
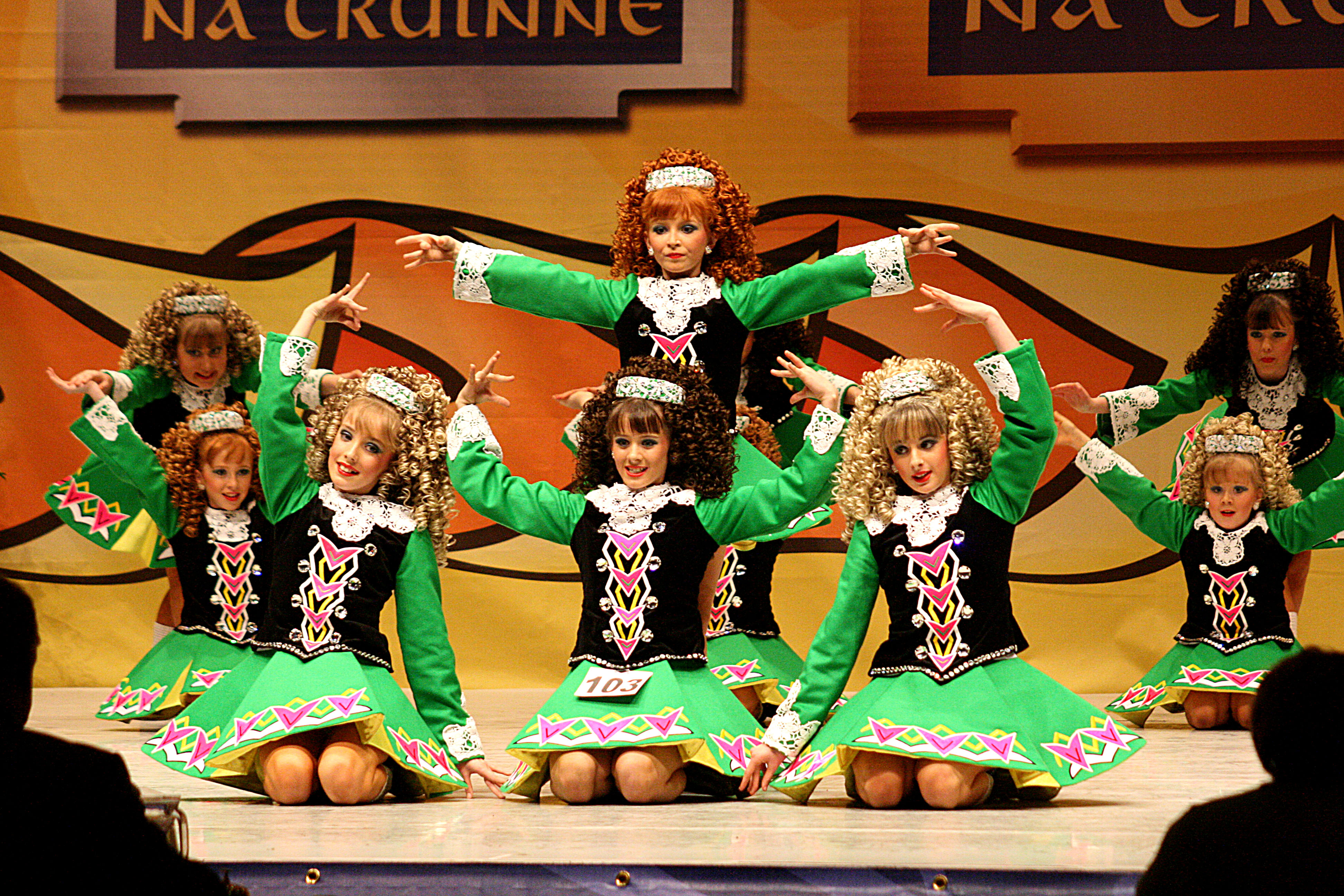
- Sean Eireann McMahon School of Irish Dancing competes at Oireachtas Rince na Cruinne 2010 in Glasgow, Scotland
- Date: Holy Week
- Frequency: Annually
- Participants: 5,000
- Attendance: 25,000
- Area: International
- Major events: Irish stepdance
- Organiser: An Coimisiún Le Rincí Gaelacha

Oireachtas Rince na Cruinne (English: The Irish Dancing World Championships; often simply the Worlds) is an annual Irish stepdance competition run by An Coimisiún Le Rincí Gaelacha (the Irish Dancing Commission). The Worlds include competitions for solo stepdance, organised by gender and age; and for certain traditional and original ceili dances, also divided by age group and team gender composition. Oireachtas Rince na Cruinne is the top competition of the hierarchical system operated by An Coimisiún, and dancers must qualify at major Irish stepdance events across the world in order to compete.

The first Oireachtas Rince na Cruinne was run in 1970, and the event is now one of six oireachtais (championship competitions) under different organisations to be called the World Championships. Of these, Oireachtas Rince na Cruinne, sometimes called the "Olympics of Irish dance", is the largest, attracting some 5,000 competitors and 25,000 spectators each year from over 30 countries. (Note: The next largest, run by An Comhdháil Na Múinteoirí Le Rincí Gaelacha, involves about 1,700 competitors.) It has played a role in the globalisation of Irish stepdance and Irish dance generally, and, since the beginning of the 21st century, has been held in locations across the British Isles and in North America.

The Worlds traditionally run across Holy Week, (Note: Although sources describe the competition as taking place in Easter Week, the last day of the Championships is usually Easter Sunday, meaning that it occurs in the week more usually known as Holy Week in Christian traditions.) and have at times extended to various cultural events outside of dancing.

== History ==
=== Origins (1927–1969) ===
An Coimisiún Le Rincí Gaelacha was established between 1927 and 1930 by the Gaelic League, which had for some years beforehand been consolidating control over Irish dancing as a means of promoting the Irish nationalist movement. An Coimisiún's original stated objectives, laid down at the Congress of the Gaelic League in 1931, were to "protect and promote Irish dancing" and to "direct and control all Irish Dancing competitions throughout Ireland". Among the earliest events developed by the new organisation was Oireachtas Rince na hÉireann (the All-Ireland Championships), which was first established as an independent event in 1929. It had previously been a component of the Gaelic League's annual Oireachtas cultural festival. A second major event, the Great Britain Championships, developed in the 1950s to meet increasing demand for Irish stepdance competitions in London and surrounds.

The gradual transition of An Coimisiún from local to international governing body began in the early 1950s. With the advent of affordable air travel and improved communication links from the 1960s onward, increased contact with dancing teachers across the Irish diaspora led An Coimisiún to gradually become a global organisation. This transition included the first examinations for teachers and adjudicators to be held in the United States and Australia. The concept of a World Championships event was first discussed in 1967. In early 1968, An Coimisiún established Provincial Championships in Leinster, Munster and Connacht, complementing the existing championships in Ulster, as part of a scheme which envisaged both the All-Ireland and Great Britain Championships becoming open only to dancers living in Ireland and Great Britain respectively. This change, which mirrored a similar system being developed in Australia at the time, was hoped to eventually lead to dancers qualifying first for their national championships and then for a newly created World Championships.

At the same time, An Comhdháil na Múinteoirí le Rincí Gaelacha (the Congress of Irish Dance Teachers), a Dublin-based organisation with whom many of An Coimisiún's teachers had been associated since the early 1960s, began to increase its influence. This caused tensions within An Coimisiún, particularly because of a perceived over-representation of delegates from the Gaelic League. In December 1969, teachers were compelled to register with one organisation or the other, which led to many of An Coimisiún's registered teachers within Ireland leaving the organisation. This event, which would become known as "the split", eventually resulted in An Comhdháil establishing itself as an alternative governing body for Irish dance with its own system of registration, examinations and competition. The loss of nearly half of An Coimisiún's teachers seriously jeopardised its planned World Championships, but a majority of overseas teachers continued to support the event, and this enabled preparations to continue.

One long-term impact of the split prior to the first Oireachtas Rince na Cruinne was the eventual establishment of competing World Championship events. An Comhdháil increased its reach into the early 21st century, and in 2012 renamed its All-Ireland Championships the World Championships in order to compete with Oireachtas Rince na Cruinne. Further ructions within An Comhdhail had also resulted in the establishment of several other Irish dancing regulatory bodies, many of which themselves expanded into international markets. By 2017, Cumann Rince Dea Mheasa, the World Irish Dance Association, Cumann Rince Náisiúnta and Cumann Rince Gaelach were each hosting World Championship events, with varying levels of international participation. Oireachtas Rince na Cruinne remains the largest of the six events.

=== Early years (1970–1994) ===
The first Oireachtas Rince na Cruinne was eventually held in the Coláiste Mhuire Auditorium in Parnell Square, Dublin, on 1–3 May 1970, with five solo championships for men (by age group), five for women, three ceili championships and two "figure dance" championships. This event also included a number of "subsidiary" competitions not considered part of the Championships themselves; these were discontinued after the first year due to the popularity of the main event. The establishment of this event has been described as the most significant development in Irish stepdance during the history of An Coimisiún. It represented a fulfilment of An Coimisiún's goal to unite the Irish diaspora under a single, homogenous identity.

The Championships were judged by a single panel of three adjudicators, who awarded only three placings in each event. Over the following years, the number of judges was increased and separate panels introduced in an effort to improve the quality of adjudication.

The early years of Oireachtas Rince na Cruinne saw little success for competitors from outside Ireland, despite the presence of a large contingent of North American dancers. This was due to a number of factors including the overseas competitors' style of dance, which was viewed as by the Irish as outdated, and differences in competition protocol between North America and Ireland. However, Michael Flatley, who became the first North American winner of the World Championships in 1975, recalled that his attempt to win at Oireachtas Rince na Cruinne focused on adopting a more rigid and conservative dance style that would be accepted by Irish adjudicators. Flatley had competed at Oireachtas Rince na Cruinne for the first time the year prior, and had placed fourth. The difficulty of competing successfully in Ireland was known to North American dancers as the "Emerald Barrier", and contributed to the development of an extensive system of competitions and championships on the North American continent. In 1971, the Irish Dancing Teachers' Association of North America chartered a Boeing 747 in an attempt to increase the number of North American competitors. In 1972, two entire Boeing 707s from Aer Lingus were booked to transport the North American contingent.

American teams experienced many of the same difficulties as solo dancers in succeeding during the early years of Oireachtas Rince na Cruinne, although in some cases, the differences were more explicitly political. A North American dance drama team which had previously met with some success was placed last in the 1986 competition. Although the official reason for the decision was the inclusion of non-Irish music in the choreography, the team's teacher alleged to American media that the adjudicators had resented the dance's commentary on the Catholic Church. Conor Hayes became the first Australian to win a World Championship as late as 1996, and the inferiority of overseas competitors in the perception of adjudicators and Irish participants persisted into the early 21st century.

Even within Ireland, the Worlds were initially dominated by dance schools from Ulster, whose style had become well-known via television broadcasts in the late 1969s. However, following the commencement of the Troubles in Northern Ireland in 1969, the competitive Irish dancing structure in the region rapidly disintegrated, and with it, the success of Ulster dancers.

From 1975 onwards, the national championships of Australia, North America, Ireland and Great Britain, which had until that point served as qualifying events for the Worlds, were supplemented by regional championships in each country – North America, for instance, was divided into seven regions, to increase the number of world qualifiers. The system of regional and national championships serving as qualifying events was eventually expanded globally.

Following complaints about the requirement that dancers qualify for the Championships, An Coimisiún decided to open the 1984 Worlds in Cork City to all dancers, with no qualification required. The subsequent massive influx of dancers necessitated the use of four separate venues in Cork over the course of 8 days, at the time the largest Irish dance event ever conducted. The large number of dancers in each section necessitated an extension to the usual three rounds of competition so that adjudicators had the opportunity to properly rank dancers. It was decided that due to the logistical complexities of such a large event, qualification would be reinstated for 1985.

The late 1970s and early 1980s saw the gradual introduction of metronomes to regulate the tempo of accompanying music, as well as the introduction of a set number of bars for each dance. The length of each performance had previously been at the discretion of the judging panel, which had resulted in unfair disadvantage to competitors forced to dance for longer. The 1986 Worlds, held in Limerick, were the first to use computer technology for the tabulation of results.

=== Riverdance era (1994–present) ===
The success of the Riverdance show after its debut at the interval of the 1994 Eurovision Song Contest drastically transformed Irish dance in its style, popularity, and relationship to traditional Irish arts. Within the two-year timeframe of the first Riverdance the number of competitors at Oireachtas Rince na Cruinne increased by 25%. This followed a period of approximately five years where participation numbers had remained roughly constant. The increase in competitor numbers was largely concentrated in younger age groups and led to the first Worlds sections with more than 100 competing dancers. However, the increase in numbers was confined largely to female dancers, and the decades following Riverdance saw a decline in the number of male dancers and mixed-gender ceili teams.

1994 also marked the 25th edition of Oireachtas Rince na Cruinne. A commemorative video was produced by An Coimisiún and made available for purchase after the Championships. This was among the first Irish stepdance competitions for which An Coimisiún granted permission for filming.

In 2000, Belfast was announced as the location for the first Worlds to be held outside the Republic of Ireland. At the time, some competitors expressed fears for their safety in the new location, but Belfast authorities were keen to ensure the event's success to improve the city's reputation as a tourist destination. The 2001 Championships, planned to be held in Ennis, were cancelled due to the outbreak of foot-and-mouth disease in Great Britain, from where nearly 35% of that year's competitors were expected to travel. The first Worlds to be cancelled caused substantially increased demand for the North American National Championships, traditionally held at the end of July, and forced organisers of that event to add stage capacity to cope with the influx of dancers. Furthermore, as a result of qualifiers for the 2001 event being allowed to carry over their qualification status to 2002, the next year in Glasgow saw a one-third increase on the usual number of competitors.

In 2007, An Coimisiún launched a now-defunct official website for Oireachtas Rince na Cruinne at worldirishdancing.com. This website provided information on results and daily photographic commentary during the Championships.

The Worlds were held three times in North America in the early 21st century: Philadelphia in 2009, Boston in 2013 and Montreal in 2015. Although the number of competitors was higher than ever before due to the large number of dancers in the region, many dancers from Ireland and the UK did not attend, which led to a significant drop in the number of team entries. In 2009, to celebrate the 40th Championships, and in recognition of the increasingly global nature of the Worlds, a replica of the championship trophies was cast with the name of each host city inscribed on its base. This trophy is held by the host city for the year in which it holds Oireachtas Rince na Cruinne.

At a meeting of An Coimisiún on 20–21 January 2018, a new "double recall" system was approved for Oireachtas Rince na Cruinne 2019 and beyond, following a consultation and development process begun in 2016. The new system, in which dancers compete in 2 rounds of "heats" prior to the existing 3 round structure (redesignated "finals"), was implemented to deal with rising qualification numbers and venue management difficulties. Announcing the system, chairperson of An Coimisiún James McCutcheon also noted the morale benefits of having an intermediate goal for dancers between qualification and final round recall.

The “double recall” or “heats” system has been removed going forward for solo dancing championships, starting with the 2025 event. Dancers will complete a heavy round, a light round and the recalled dancers will perform a set dance for their third round.

=== Locations ===
From 1980 onwards, when it was held for the first time outside Dublin, Oireachtas Rince na Cruinne has been held in a number of cities both within Ireland and in other countries such as Scotland and the United States. Past and future host cities of the World Championships include:

- 1970–1979: Dublin
- 1980–1981: Dún Laoghaire
- 1982: Galway
- 1983: Dublin
- 1984: Cork City
- 1985: Malahide
- 1986: Limerick City
- 1987–1989: Galway
- 1990: Cork City
- 1991–1992: Limerick City
- 1993: Mosney
- 1994: Dublin
- 1995: Galway
- 1996: Dublin
- 1997: Galway
- 1998–1999: Ennis
- 2000: Belfast (Note: The first Worlds to be held outside the Republic of Ireland.)
- 2001: Cancelled due to Foot-and-mouth outbreak (Note: The scheduled location was Ennis.)
- 2002: Glasgow
- 2003: Killarney
- 2004: Belfast
- 2005: Ennis
- 2006: Belfast
- 2007: Glasgow (Note: The first Worlds to be held outside Ireland or Northern Ireland.)
- 2008: Belfast
- 2009: Philadelphia (Note: The first Worlds to be held in North America, the continent with the largest number of dancers.)
- 2010: Glasgow
- 2011: Dublin
- 2012: Belfast
- 2013: Boston
- 2014: London
- 2015: Montreal
- 2016: Glasgow
- 2017: Dublin
- 2018: Glasgow (Note: Originally scheduled for Washington, D.C.)
- 2019: Greensboro
- 2020: Cancelled due to COVID-19 outbreak
- 2021: Cancelled due to COVID-19 outbreak
- 2022: Belfast
- 2023: Montreal
- 2024: Glasgow
- 2025: Dublin
- 2026: Schaumburg, Illinois

== Governance ==
Oireachtas Rince na Cruinne is organised and overseen by An Coimisiún's Coiste Oireachtaisí (Oireachtas Committee), which is also responsible for the annual All-Ireland Championships. The committee's budget is set by Comhairle Bainistaíochta (the Council of Management). A chair of the Oireachtas Committee is elected each year at the annual general meeting of An Coimisiún.

Locations for Oireachtas Rince na Cruinne are selected following a bidding process, which allows regional representatives to submit their preferred venue for consideration. Bidding is led by both local An Coimisiún teachers and business representatives. The final decision is made by a vote of the Oireachtas Committee, taking into account the suitability of venue and the area's capacity to support the event with appropriate accommodation.

The approximate cost of staging Oireachtas Rince na Cruinne has been estimated at £400,000, which is covered by grants from local authorities and entrance fees from dancers. The event does not receive any funding from the Irish government. (Note: One of the historical reasons for the lack of government support is An Coimisiún's reluctance to allow its dancers to participate in other dance forms and cultural activities.) It has been estimated that the event contributes €15,000,000 to local economies, in addition to flow-on social and economic benefits. One such outcome is the exposure of an entire city or region to thousands of potential tourists; as a result, Boston tourism authorities compared the total impact of the Worlds on the local economy to that of the Super Bowl. Most direct economic benefit is created by high booking rates at nearby hotels and restaurants. For example, the Belfast event in 2004 saw every hotel room in the city centre occupied for the duration of the championships.

== Qualification ==
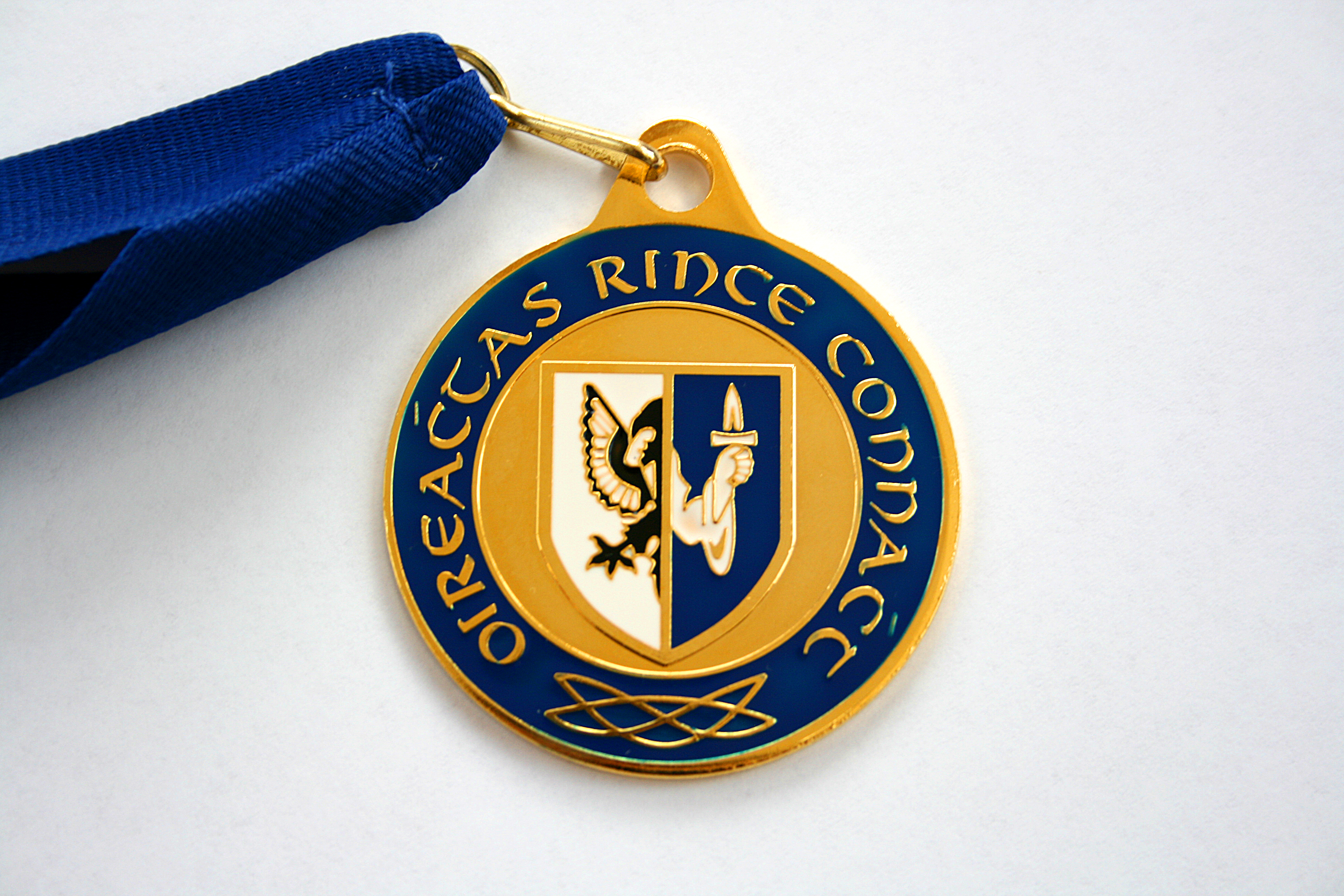
A medal awarded to Oireachtas Rince na Cruinne qualifiers at the Connacht Oireachtas.

Solo dancers must qualify for Oireachtas Rince na Cruinne at a qualifying event recognised by An Coimisiún. There are two classes of qualifying event: "primary qualifiers" open only to dancers in a particular region, and "secondary qualifiers" on a national or international scale. (Note: Each of the secondary qualifiers, with the exception of the Australian Championships, is open to competitors from anywhere in the world, however, only local dancers may qualify for Oireachtas Rince na Cruinne at a given event.) In some regions of the United States, pre-qualification for qualifiers is required. For each section at both primary and secondary qualifiers (according to the age groups of Oireachtas Rince na Cruinne) the top 5 placed dancers qualify, as well as an additional dancer for every 10 participants in the section. Generally speaking, all dancers must compete and qualify at their primary qualifier; however, dancers who fail to do so may qualify at their secondary qualifier or may be eligible for automatic qualification if they placed in a medal winning position at the previous Oireachtas Rince na Cruinne. Dancers who do not participate in their primary qualifier may not qualify secondarily or automatically unless they submit a valid reason, such as a medical condition, to An Coimisiún. (Note: Ineligibility to compete under the "transfer rule", which excludes dancers from competition for six months after transferring dance schools, is not considered a valid reason. This technicality was challenged, and upheld, in a 2017 Irish High Court case.)

This system was introduced in 1981 after the establishment of regions in North America, in order to give dancers a second opportunity to qualify for the Worlds if their result at a regional qualifier was unusually poor. The secondary qualification system was subsequently introduced for all regions.

Summary of qualifying events for Oireachtas Rince na Cruinne
Primary qualifier	Secondary qualifier
Connacht Oireachtas	Irish National Championships
Munster Oireachtas	Irish National Championships
Leinster Oireachtas	Irish National Championships
Ulster Oireachtas	Irish National Championships
Midlands (Note: For the Midlands region of England.)	Oireachtas Rince na hEireann (All-Ireland Championships) Scottish National Oireachtas
North East England (Note: For the geographical region of North East England.)	Oireachtas Rince na hEireann (All-Ireland Championships) Scottish National Oireachtas
North West England (Note: For the geographical regions of North West England and Yorkshire and the Humber.)	Oireachtas Rince na hEireann (All-Ireland Championships) Scottish National Oireachtas
Southern England (Note: For the geographical regions of East of England, Greater London, South East England and South West England.)	Oireachtas Rince na hEireann (All-Ireland Championships) Scottish National Oireachtas
Scotland	Oireachtas Rince na hEireann (All-Ireland Championships) Scottish National Oireachtas
Mainland Europe Oireachtas	Oireachtas Rince na hEireann (All-Ireland Championships) Scottish National Oireachtas
South African Championships	Oireachtas Rince na hEireann (All-Ireland Championships) Scottish National Oireachtas
Elsewhere (Note: Dancers from regions where a primary qualifier is not held, such as Russia, Asia and the Middle East, may qualify at a secondary qualifier specified each year in the Oireachtas Rince na Cruinne syllabus.)	Oireachtas Rince na hEireann (All-Ireland Championships) Scottish National Oireachtas
Eastern Canadian Region Oireachtas (Note: For the areas encompassed by each North American region, see this map.)	North American National Championships
Mid-America Oireachtas	North American National Championships
Mid-Atlantic Oireachtas	North American National Championships
New England Oireachtas	North American National Championships
Southern Region Oireachtas	North American National Championships
Western Canada Oireachtas	North American National Championships
Western US Regional Oireachtas	North American National Championships
ACT State Championships	Australian National Championships
New South Wales State Championships	Australian National Championships
Queensland State Championships	Australian National Championships
South Australian State Championships	Australian National Championships
Victorian State Championships (Note: For the states of Victoria and Tasmania.)	Australian National Championships
West Australian State Championships	Australian National Championships
N/A	New Zealand National Championships (Note: No primary qualifier is held in New Zealand.)

A list of qualifying dancers is published annually in Irish Dancing Magazine. World Qualifier status is considered prestigious by dancers in its own right. Indeed, the chief aspiration of many competitive dancers is simply to participate in Oireachtas Rince na Cruinne. A large number of dancers who qualify for Oireachtas Rince na Cruinne do not attend, primarily because of the expense of international travel.

The qualification system places a disproportionate restriction on the number of female dancers at the Worlds, and consequently produces a female–male ratio of competitors much lower than at other Irish stepdance events. The massive increase in dancer numbers following Riverdance in 1994, however, did increase this ratio substantially, as the increase in female competitors was not matched by an increase in male competitors.

== Adjudication ==
Adjudicators for Oireachtas Rince na Cruinne are selected from An Coimisiún's registered adjudicators, who may apply to adjudicate if they have at least two years' experience judging major competitions. Adjudicators may not judge at Oireachtas Rince na Cruinne more than once in a five-year period. The final selection of the adjudicator pool takes into account experience, reputation and knowledge of competitive Irish stepdancing, and the members of the pool are notified that they have been selected in the December prior to the Worlds.

As with all competitions run by An Coimisiún, adjudicators may not judge dancers with whom they are associated. This includes dancers whom they or their relatives have taught in the previous two years, or dancers to whom they are related. As it is not feasible to select adjudicators who have no direct or indirect relationship to dancers at Oireachtas Rince na Cruinne, dancers associated with the selected adjudicators are forbidden from competing once the adjudicator pool is announced, and their qualification status is automatically carried over to the following edition of the Worlds.

From the pool selected, a ballot is publicly drawn on each morning of the Championships to determine the makeup of adjudication panels for each of the day's sections. There are three separate panels for each day of the Championships, with seven members each. (Note: In previous years, due to logistical limitations, some panels were composed of only five members.)

The decisions of adjudicators are final, and there exists no mechanism by which to question scores or rankings. It has been argued that this system contributes to political and personal biases among adjudication panels. In addition, participants in Oireachtas Rince na Cruinne frequently accuse adjudicators (though not directly) of politicising their decisions or favouring dancers of one region over another.

== Competitions ==
=== Solo championships ===
There are 25 solo championships: a male and female championship for each of 11 age groups between 10–11 years and 20–21 years, female 21–23 years, female over 23 and male over 21. All age groups encompass a single calendar year of birth with the exceptions of the "Ladies 21–23 years" championship, which covers two birth years, and the "Ladies over 23" and "Men over 21" championships, to which no upper age limit is applied. The youngest age group is 10–11 years. In general, the sections for younger age groups are held earlier in the week of the Championships.

==== Dances ====
Each solo championship consists of three rounds, as do other stepdance competitions named as "championships". The first round, danced in hard shoes, is either a double jig or hornpipe depending on age group; the second round, in soft shoes consists of either slip jig or reel. (Note: By tradition, male dancers do not perform the slip jig, and hence compete with reel at every age group.) Jigs and slip jigs are danced for 48 bars, while hornpipes and reels are danced for 40 bars.

After the first two rounds, scores are counted and 50 of the top-ranked dancers are "recalled". These competitors perform the third, or "set dance" round, in hard shoes, one at a time. The "set" of the name refers to a particular tune, rather than to any specified choreography. (Note: The set dance round is also unrelated to set dance, another form of traditional Irish dance.) The set dance at Oireachtas Rince na Cruinne is performed in a contrasting time to the first round – that is, if the dancer performed a hornpipe (4/4 time) in the first round, they must perform a jig (6/8 time) in the set dance round, and vice versa. There are 30 set dance tunes approved for use at Oireachtas Rince na Cruinne.

==== Placing and awards ====
After the three rounds have been completed and final scores tabulated, the individual place scores for each dancer are read in public and simultaneously revealed on video displays throughout the venue. The final placings are then read in order from first to last. Only dancers who have completed all three rounds may be placed in this way.

A formula in each year's syllabus describes the number of competitors who will be awarded prizes, which is dependent on the total number of dancers in the section. These dancers are presented on the stage individually in an official presentation ceremony, and awarded a "World medal". The top five dancers in each section ascend a dais, and are presented with a distinctive perpetual trophy colloquially known as a "globe", as well as other trophies available in each section. The globe trophies were originally donated in 2007 by Michael Flatley and the first place versions include the names of all previous section winners inscribed around the base. Winners of male sections are frequently presented with a belt as a trophy, a practice which originated at a dance competition held in 1895 by the Gaelic Athletic Association.

It is usual for winners of a section to be described as having "won the Worlds", even though there is no mechanism by which to win the whole event. It is common for older winners of the World Championships to retire from competitive dance immediately afterwards.

==== Post-2019 ====
For Oireachtas Rince na Cruinne 2019 onwards, a "double recall" system of 5 dancing rounds will be implemented. During the "heats", each age group will compete in a hard shoe and soft shoe dance, similar to the pre-2019 system. However, each competition will be divided in a pseudorandom fashion into two "splits" of equal size. Following these two rounds, a list of recalled dancers will be publicly announced; these dancers will move to the "finals" on the following day. (Note: At the January 2018 meeting of An Coimisiún, the proportion of recalled dancers was not determined.)

The finals day of competition will be judged by a new panel of adjudicators, and will operate with the same three-round structure as the pre-2019 system. The number of dancers progressing to the set dance round, as a proportion of the original entry numbers, will remain the same.

As of January 2018, An Coimisiún was considering retaining the pre-2019 system for all male sections and female age groups U11 and U12.

=== Team championships ===
==== Ceili championships ====
There are nine championships for ceili dance at Oireachtas Rince na Cruinne: five age groups for girls' teams, and four for mixed gender teams. The ceili dances performed at the Worlds are those which have been accepted by An Coimisiún as part of the stepdance tradition and which are found in the official publication of dances, Ar Rince Ceili. (Note: Until its revision in 2014, this manual was known as Ar Rince Foirne.) Presently, the only ceili dances accepted at Oireachtas Rince na Cruinne are eight-hand dances, that is, for eight dancers.

==== Figure dancing championships ====
Figure dances are dances of eight to sixteen dancers, originally composed but performed to Irish traditional music. (Note: The term "figure dance" is sometimes also used to refer to ceili dances, but at Oireachtas Rince na Cruinne has always referred to a separate competition.) Performed both for competition and exhibition, they are required to portray an Irish theme or item through the dance. A figure dancing championship, for "newly composed dances that would be suitable for performance at a ceílí", was included at the first Oireachtas Rince na Cruinne. After the Dance Drama section was spun off in 1974, the figure dance section was intended to retain a more traditional style.

Dancers in figure dance teams at Oireachtas Rince na Cruinne are required to dance basic steps such as those found in approved ceili dances, and choreographies must not exceed 4 minutes. There are between 8 and 16 dancers in each team. Before each dance, the story portrayed by the dance is read aloud by the stage steward. It is common for figure dance teams to supply their own recorded music, which has the advantage of enabling changes in tempo and time signature through the dance, but live accompaniment is permitted. Figure dance teams are judged on their ability to portray the story, the quality of the choreography, individual footwork and technique, and the team's synchronisation and presentation.

There are five figure dance championships: three age groups for girls teams, including an open age group, and two age groups for mixed teams (with a minimum of 4 male dancers) including an open age group. The senior figure dancing competition is considered among the most prestigious sections at Oireachtas Rince na Cruinne, a reputation which it carried from its predecessor competition at the All-Ireland Championships.

==== Dance Drama championships ====
The Dance Drama championship was conceived following the 1973 Worlds to distinguish the traditional figure dance section from more modern choreographies which involved the use of props and costume changes. Introduced in 1974, the section was renamed "Dance Drama" for the 1978 Worlds. Within a few years, Dance Drama was one of the most broadly popular sections at Oireachtas Rince na Cruinne.

Dance Drama teams are composed of between 8 and 20 dancers. The choreography is required to portray a "specifically Irish historical or traditional story, event or theme" and may be between 4 and 6 minutes in length, as well as a five-minute period before and after the performance for preparing and clearing the stage. Like the figure dance, the story accompanying the choreography is read publicly beforehand, and it is common for music to be pre-recorded. Simple changes of stage lighting and the use of portable props are permitted during the choreography. Teams are judged on the quality of choreography, execution of dancing, costuming and the "impact on adjudicator". The style of choreography has been described as a combination of Irish dance with physical theatre, due to its heavy reliance on mime and facial expression, and is of particular attraction to professional choreographers. It also contains elements of eighteenth-century pantomime.

Since 2002, the Dance Drama event has been held in a separate venue to the main Oireachtas Rince na Cruinne competitions. Later, a special printed program was introduced for the event to cater for increased ticket sales among general audiences. In addition, interval acts were added to maintain a professional quality while the stage was reset for each team's performance. The Dance Drama event, along with the figure dancing championship, is often described as the "highlight" of the World Championships.

== Music ==
Musical accompaniment for the dancers has been provided by live musicians throughout the history of Oireachtas Rince na Cruinne; the only exceptions are the figure dance and Dance Drama championships where pre-recorded accompaniment is increasingly common. Modern practice is that the usual instruments are piano accordion and electronic keyboard, although music has been provided on other traditional instruments such as fiddle. Accompanists at the Worlds are increasingly former dancers or practising teachers, as the demands of providing music for dance competitions require an understanding of the environment.

== Concurrent events and facilities ==
An opening ceremony including formalities with An Coimisiún and Gaelic League officials, as well as entertainment items, is held on the first day of the championships. This ceremony often includes representation of the countries in attendance with flags. The Oireachtas Committee also organises performances from local entertainers, including regional folk dancers and folk musicians to increase the event's appeal to the general public.

A large facility in close proximity to the competition venue is typically set aside for vendors of dance–related products. These include specialised shoes, wigs, makeup and memorabilia. Designers of competition costumes also operate stalls to promote their design services.

A practice floor is set aside for competing dancers to warm up before their competition.

== Publicity ==
Local dignitaries, including ambassadors of Ireland and other countries represented at the Oireachtas Rince na Cruinne, are frequently involved with the event. The Worlds have also been attended by the President of Ireland on a number of occasions.

A 1995 documentary, by producer Michele Fox for London Weekend Television, examined Oireachtas Rince na Cruinne, held that year in Dublin.

The 2010 Sue Bourne film Jig followed eight dancers on their journey to the 40th World Championships, held in Glasgow in 2010. Bourne initially struggled to obtain permission for the film from An Coimisiún because of their concerns about protecting dancers' original choreography, but was eventually allowed to produce the film on the basis of its potential publicity benefits.

An Coimisiún Le Rincí Gaelacha has officially expressed disappointment that the Worlds do not receive proportionate media coverage when held in Ireland, given that the event is not typically attended by any television stations like the Irish national broadcaster RTÉ.

== Notable champions ==
- Michael Flatley, who starred in the 1994 Eurovision interval act which became Riverdance, and multiple subsequent Irish dance shows, won his first World Championship in 1975 at the age of 17. He was the first non-European in any age group to win a section at Oireachtas Rince na Cruinne.
- Jean Butler, who performed alongside Flatley as the female lead in the Riverdance interval act, won several Worlds titles during her competitive dance career.
- Colin Dunne, who later became a choreographer and performer in Riverdance and Dancing on Dangerous Ground and then transitioned to contemporary dance, was the first dancer to win a World Championship in the same year as the All England and All Ireland championships, which he did in 1978 at the age of 9.
- Colm O'Se won 10 World titles between 1983 and 1992, more than any other dancer in the history of Oireachtas Rince na Cruinne.
- Michaela Hinds retired from competitive Irish dance in 2017 after winning 7 solo championships, more than any other North American in the history of Oireachtas Rince na Cruinne.
- Julia O'Rourke won her first solo championship in 2010 and was featured in the Jig documentary. She won further titles in 2014, 2015 and 2017 before her retirement from competition.

== Bibliography ==
- "The 48th World Irish Dancing Championships 2018" (PDF). An Coimisiún Le Rincí Gaelacha. 2018.
- "Rules for Registered Teachers and Adjudicators" (PDF). An Coimisiún Le Rincí Gaelacha. 12 September 2016.
- Cullinane, John (2016). Aspects of the History of the World Irish Dancing Championships. John P. Cullinane.
- Foley, Catherine E. (2016). Step Dancing in Ireland: Culture and History. Routledge. ISBN 9781317050056.
- MacDonnchadha, Sean (2017). "Important Information re Oireachtas Rince na Cruinne 2017" (PDF). An Coimisiún Le Rincí Gaelacha.
- Venable, Elizabeth (October 2001). "Inventing Tradition: The Global Development of Irish Dance". In LaPointe-Crump, Janice (ed.). Cord 2001: Transmigratory Moves, Dance in Global Circulation: Conference Proceedings. Congress on Research in Dance. pp. 281–289 – via Scribd.
- Venable, Elizabeth (March 2008). Dresses and Messages: Commodification of Irish Dancing (Master of Arts thesis). University of California – via Scribd.
- Whelan, Frank (2000). The complete guide to Irish dance. Appletree. ISBN 0862818052.
- Wulff, Helena (2007). Dancing at the Crossroads: Memory and Mobility in Ireland. Berghahn Books. ISBN 9781845453282.
