= Michaela Hinds =

Canadian dancer (born 1995)

Michaela Hinds (born 1995) is an Irish-Canadian Irish dancer, the most awarded North American in the history of the An Coimisiún Le Rincí Gaelacha's Oireachtas Rince na Cruinne (Irish Dancing World Championships). She retired from competition in 2017, after her seventh win.

== Biography ==
Hinds began Irish dance at age three-and-a-half, winning her first competition in 2003.

Hinds' first world championship win came in 2009 at Philadelphia, the first year that the event was held outside of Ireland. She retired from competition in 2017, citing the wear and tear on her body; in 2016, she danced on a foot that was in the midst of healing from multiple fractures.

Hinds won twelve Eastern Canadian Championships, ten North American Championships, four Great British Championship, two All Scotland Championships, four All Ireland Championships, and seven World Championships. She is listed by the Ireland Canada Monument Society for her contributions to dance; the monument is planned for Wainborn Park in Vancouver.

One of her dance instructors suggested to CBC in 2017 that Hinds' streak played a part of increasing the global popularity of the style.

She was a Mayfield Secondary School student, and studied Irish dance at the Butler-Fearon-O'Connor School of Irish Dancing in Brampton. She now studies kinesiology at Sheridan College.
