= Irish stepdance =

Style of performance dance with its roots in traditional Irish dance

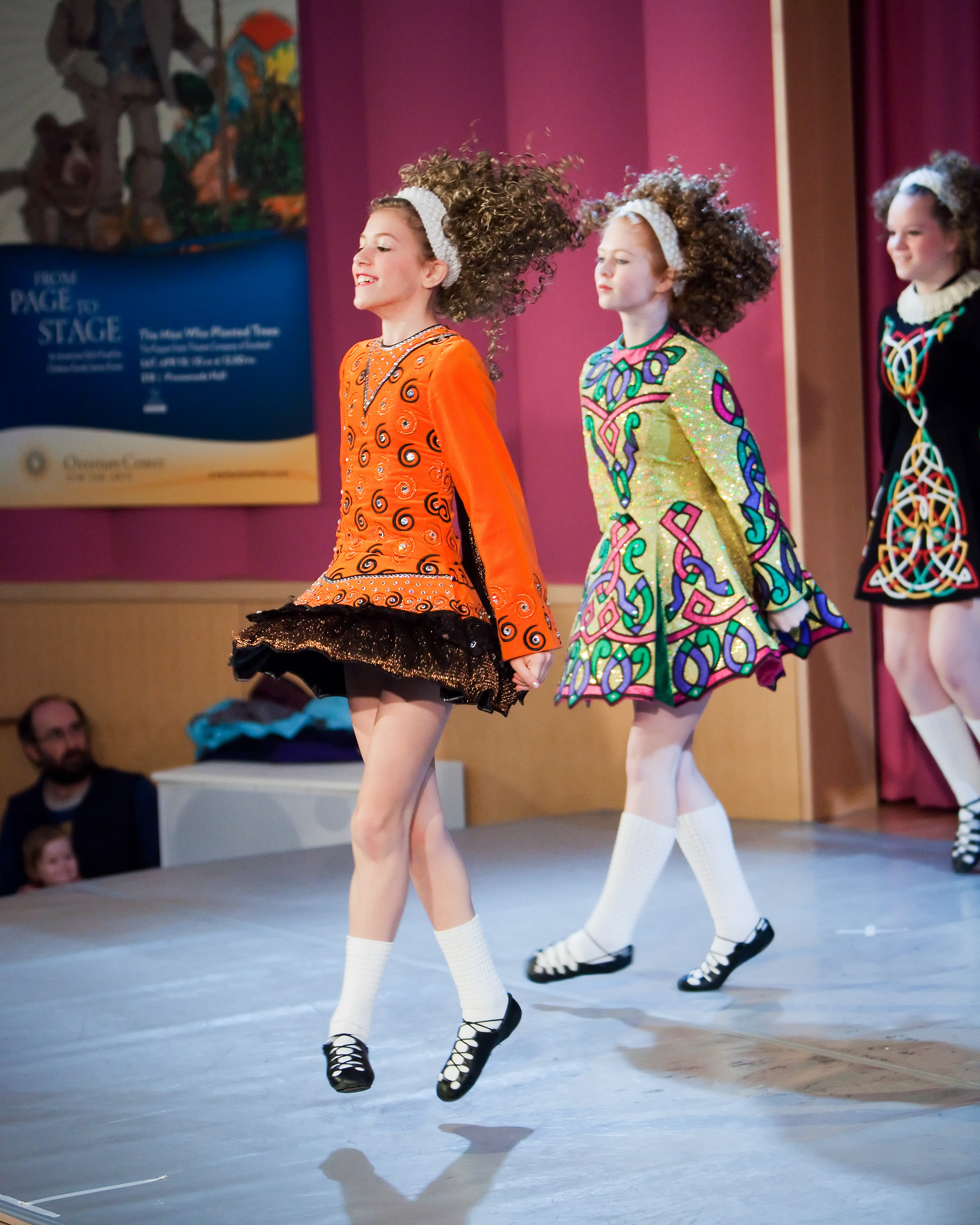
- Irish dancers performing at a show (2010)
- Medium: Dance
- Types: Performance and Competition
- Ancestor arts: Irish dance
- Originating culture: Irish
- Originating era: Mid-1800s

Irish stepdance is a style of performance dance with its roots in traditional Irish dance. It may be generally characterized by a stiff upper body and fast and precise movements of the feet, and can be performed solo or in groups. Aside from public dance performances, there are also stepdance competitions all over the world. These competitions are often called Feiseanna (singular Feis). In Irish dance culture, a Feis is a traditional Gaelic arts and culture festival. Contemporarily, costumes are sometimes considered important in Irish stepdance; costumes are typically designed to attract the judge's eye in competitions and the audience's eye in performance, with widely varying colors and patterns. In many cases, costumes are sold at high prices and can even be custom made. General appearance beside the costume is also equally important, with female dancers typically wearing curly wigs or curling their hair and male dancers often neatly styling their hair to a shape to their liking for competition or performance. Additionally, poodle socks are worn by female dancers while males wear plain black socks. Poodle socks are white socks that have distinctive ribbing, and can be embroidered with gems. This hyper-stylization originated in the Irish diaspora, while traditional costume was homemade or from the local dressmaker and embroidered with Celtic knots and designs.

Riverdance, an Irish step-dancing performance in the 1994 Eurovision Song Contest that later became a hugely successful theatrical production, greatly contributed to its popularity. Once Riverdance became a large production, it changed the way that Irish dance was performed and viewed. Now that entrepreneurs could capitalize on Irish culture, they were able to tweak it to the audience's liking. This meant adding a theatrical flair to the performance, including arm movements (as opposed to the previously rigid top half that dancers maintained) as well as sexualizing the dance and the costumes. To some, this was a betrayal of tradition, but to others, it was a way of expanding Irish culture and became widely accepted. Following after Riverdance was Lord of the Dance and many other theatrical productions based on Irish stepdance; Michael Flatley, an Irish stepdancer, became a well-known name within these shows.

Two types of shoes are typically worn in Irish stepdance: hard shoes, which make sounds similar to tap shoes; and soft shoes (also called Ghillies), which are similar to ballet slippers. There are different dances specific to each type of shoe, and different types of music with varying beats are played based on the dance, although soft and hard shoe dances all share basic moves and rhythms.

== History ==
=== Early history (prehistory–1927) ===
The dancing traditions of Ireland are likely to have grown in tandem with Irish traditional music. Its first roots may have been in Pre-Christian Ireland, but Irish dance was also partially influenced by dance forms on the Continent, especially the quadrille dances. Some of the earliest recorded references to Irish dance are to the Rinnce Fada or "long dance", towards the end of the 17th century, which was performed largely during social occasions. Traveling dancing masters taught all over Ireland beginning around the 1750s and continuing as late as the early 1900s.

By the late 19th century, at least three related styles of step dance had developed in Ireland. The style practised in Munster saw dancers on the balls of their feet, using intricate percussive techniques to create complex rhythm. On the other hand, a tradition developed in Ulster saw dancers instead using their heel to create a persistent drumming effect, and primarily performing in pairs. The Connemara style, later described as sean-nós dance, combined heel and ball movements with the swaying of the torso and vigorous movement of the arms.

The foundation of the Gaelic League in 1893, an Irish nationalist body formed with the purpose of preserving traditional Irish language and culture, radically altered the cultural status of step dance. Frank Hall has described this as the moment in which "step-Dancing in Ireland became 'Irish dancing'", and as therefore the most significant single event in the development of the dance form. Although informal competitions had long been held between towns and students of different dance masters, the first organised feis was held in 1897 by the League. The League began to codify and promote the form of step dance which was practiced in southern areas. This codification, practised from the early 1920s, greatly narrowed the range of traditional Irish dances acceptable in popular culture.

=== Codification and organisation (1927–1994) ===
In 1927, the Gaelic League set up An Coimisiún Le Rincí Gaelacha (CLRG, the Irish Dancing Commission), a separate body dedicated to the organisation and standardisation of Irish dance. CLRG created certifications for dance teachers and began to hold examinations for adjudicators of feisanna.

In the 19th century, the Irish diaspora had spread Irish dance all over the world, especially to North America and Australia. However, schools and feiseanna were not established until the early 1900s: in America these tended to be created within Irish-American urban communities, notably in Chicago and Massachusetts. The first classes in stepdancing were held there by the Philadelphia-born John McNamara.

According to the BBC's A Short History of Irish Dance, "The nature of the Irish dance tradition has changed and adapted over the centuries to accommodate and reflect changing populations and the fusion of new cultures. The history of Irish dancing is as a result a fascinating one. The popular Irish dance stage shows of the past ten years have reinvigorated this cultural art, and today Irish dancing is healthy, vibrant, and enjoyed by people across the globe."

The first television broadcast of Irish stepdance, on CBS in 1945, contributed to the increased popularity of a stepdance style originating in Ulster. This style, which incorporated balletic movements and high elevation on the toes, gradually usurped the Munster style with fast, low footwork which had prevailed up to that point.

=== Post-Riverdance era (1994–present) ===
The success of Riverdance and other dance shows in the late 20th century influenced the choreography and presentation of stepdance in both competitive and public performance environments. This included the use of simpler costumes and hairstyles for public performance in imitation of the Riverdance styles, and the development of new dance styles, such as hard shoe dances performed to music typically associated with soft shoes. In competitive dance, movements from flamenco and figure skating began to be incorporated into traditional steps, although such developments were criticised by elements of the competitive dancing community.

== Dances ==
=== Technique ===
The techniques involved in Irish stepdance are essentially similar across each of the individual dance styles. The basic style of modern step dance used in competitive contexts evolved from the stylistic features of traditional step dance in Munster. This style is largely performed on the balls of the feet with feet turned outwards. Competitive dancers are judged on posture, timing, rhythm and execution, which in practice means a rigid torso, rapid and intricate footwork, and legs and feet crossed over each other, with knees close together.

Irish stepdances can be placed into two categories: solos, which are danced by a single dancer, and ceilis or teams, which are coordinated with 2 or more dancers.

=== Solo dance ===
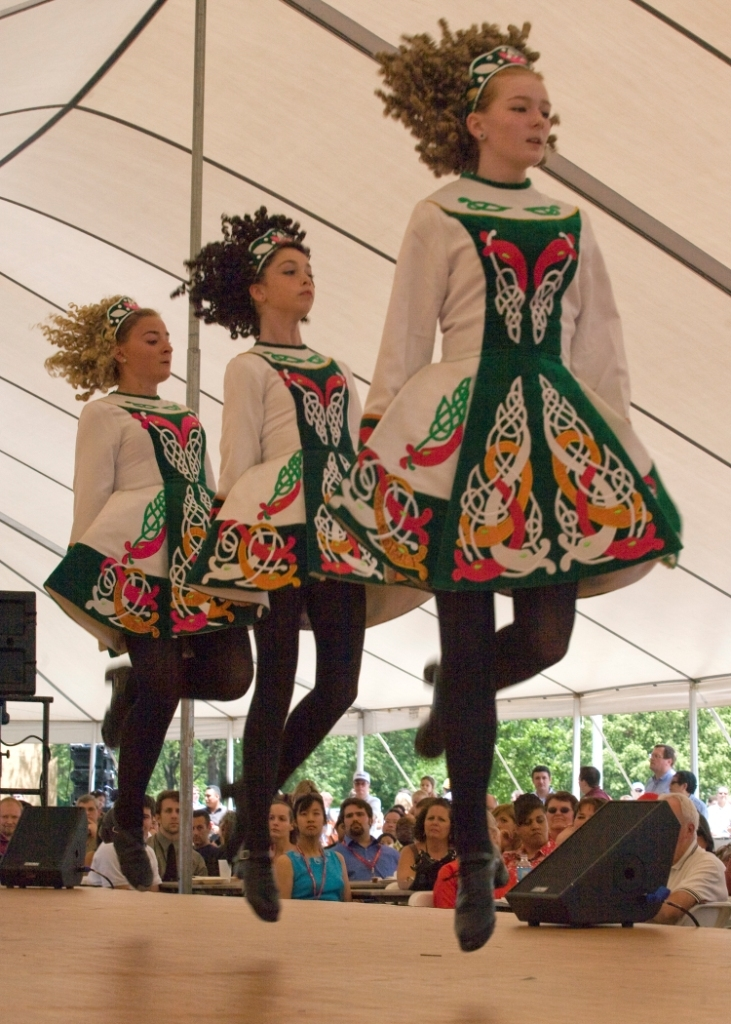
Irish stepdancers performing in school costumes and hard shoes (2008)

Reel, slip jig, hornpipe, and jig are all types of Irish stepdances and are also types of Irish traditional music. These fall into two broad categories based on the shoes worn: 'hard shoe' and 'soft shoe' dances. Reels, which are in 2/4 or 4/4 time, and slip jigs, which are in 9/8 time and sometimes considered to be the lightest and most graceful of the dances, are soft shoe dances. Hornpipes, which can be in 2/4 or 4/4 time, are danced in hard shoes. Three jigs are danced in competition: the light jig, the single jig, which is also called the Hop jig, and the treble jig, which is also called double jig. Light and single jigs are in 6/8 time, and are soft shoes dances, while the treble jig is hard shoe, danced in a slow 6/8. The last type of jig is the slip jig, which is danced in 9/8 time. There are many dances, with steps that vary between schools. The traditional set dances (danced in hardshoe) like St. Patrick's Day and the Blackbird, among others, are the only dances that all schools have the same steps.

The actual steps in Irish stepdance are usually unique to each school or dance teacher. Steps are developed by Irish dance teachers for students of their school. Each dance is built out of the same basic elements, or steps, but the dance itself is unique, and new dances and movements are being choreographed continuously. For this reason, videotaping of competitions is forbidden under the rules of An Coimisiun.

Each step is a sequence of foot movements, leg movements and leaps, which lasts for 8 repetitions of 8 bars of music. It is traditional for each step to be performed first on the right foot and then on the left foot, before moving on to the next step. This practice leads to a large proportion of dancers exhibiting a preference for their right leg over their left in dance movements. Hard shoe dancing typically includes clicking (striking the heels of the shoes against each other), trebles (the toe of the shoe striking the floor), stamps (the entire foot striking the floor), and an increasing number of complicated combinations of taps from the toes and heels.

There are two types of hard shoe dance: the solo dances, which are the hornpipe and treble jig, and the set dances, which are also solo dances, despite having the same name as a separate Irish social dance form. Traditional set dances use the same choreography regardless of the school whereas contemporary sets are choreographed by the teachers. The music and steps for each traditional set was set down by past dance masters and passed down under An Coimisiún auspices as part of the rich history of stepdancing, hence the "traditional."

There are about 40 sets used in modern stepdance, but the traditional sets performed in most levels of competition are St. Patrick's Day, the Blackbird, Job of Journeywork, Garden of Daisies, King of the Fairies, and Jockey to the Fair. The remaining traditional set dances are primarily danced at championship levels. These tunes vary in tempo to allow for more difficult steps for higher level dancers. An unusual feature of the set dance tune is that many are "crooked", with some of the parts, or sections, of the tunes departing from the common 8 bar formula. The crooked tune may have a part consisting of 7½ bars, fourteen bars, etc. For example, the "St. Patrick's Day" traditional set music consists of an eight-bar "step," followed by a fourteen-bar "set."

=== Group dance ===
The group dances are called céilí dances or, in the less formal but common case, figure dances. Competitive céilís are more precise versions of the festive group dances traditionally experienced in social gatherings.

There is a list of 30 céilí dances that have been standardised and published in An Coimisiun's Ar Rince Ceili (which replaced Ár Rinncidhe Foirne in 2015) as examples of traditional Irish folk dances. Standardized dances for 4, 6 or 8 dancers are also often found in competition. Most traditional céilí dances in competition are significantly shortened in the interests of time. Many stepdancers never learn the entire dance, as they will never dance the later parts of the dance in competition.

Other céilí dances are not standardised. In local competition, figure dances may consist of two or three dancers. These are not traditional book dances and are choreographed as a blend of both traditional céilí dancing and solo dancing. Standardized book dances for 16 dancers are also rarely offered. Figure Choreography competitions held at major oireachtasai (championships) involve more than 8 dancers and are a chance for dance schools to show off novel and intricate group choreography. An Coimisiún has also introduced a "dance drama" category, which combines physical theatre with Irish dance. A 200-word story is read and followed by a six-minute dance performance including costumes, mime and facial expression.

Some dance schools recognised by An Coimisiún Le Rincí Gaelacha place as much emphasis on céilí dancing as on solo dancing, meticulously rehearsing the dances as written in the book and striving for perfect interpretation. In competition, figure dancers are expected to dance their routine in perfect unison, forming seamless yet intricate figures based on their positions relative to each other.

== Costume ==
The development of Irish stepdance costumes occurred throughout the 20th century alongside the dance style itself. Costumes were thus heavily influenced by the rules and competitive structures put in place by An Coimisiún and other organisations. In more recent years, costumes changed dramatically and departed significantly from traditional designs.

=== Competitive costumes ===
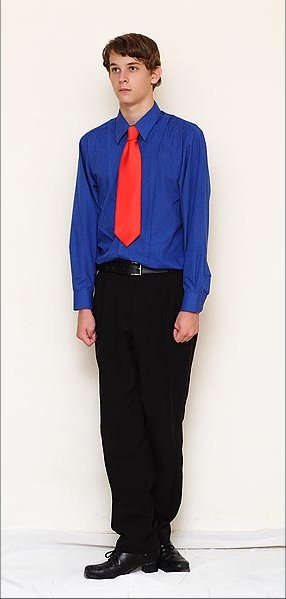
A boy's costume. It may vary from a simple shirt and tie to waistjackets.

Judges at competitions critique the dancers primarily on their performance, but they also take into account presentation. In every level of competition the dancers must wear either hard shoes or soft shoes. Boys and girls wear very distinctive costumes. Girls must wear white poodle socks or black tights. Competition dresses have changed in many ways since Irish Dance first appeared. Several generations ago the appropriate dress was simply your "Sunday Best". In the 1980s ornately embroidered velvet became popular. Other materials include gaberdine and wool. Today many different fabrics are used, including lace, sequins, silk, embroidered organzas and more. Some dresses, mainly solo dresses, have flat backed crystals added for stage appeal. Swarovski is being used more frequently. Velvet is also becoming popular again, but in multiple colours with very different, modern embroidery. Competitive dresses have stiff skirts which can be stiffened with Vilene and are intricately embroidered.

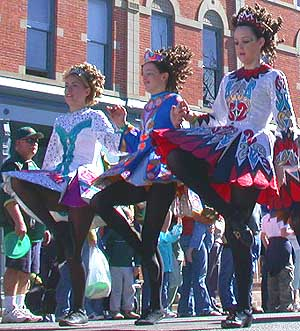
Irish step dancers in a St. Patrick's Day Parade in Fort Collins, Colorado (2005)

Male dancers often wear intricately embroidered jackets or waistcoats made from similar materials as dresses.

Costumes can be simple for the beginning female dancer; they often wear a simple dance skirt and plain blouse or their dancing school's costume. On a dance school's costume, the colours and emblems are used to represent the school and differentiate the dancer from other schools. These are similar in construction to a solo dress, but with a simpler design and with less added weight from embroidery and crystals. School costumes are usually owned, managed and distributed by the dance school.

At advanced levels, where dancers can qualify for Major competitions, solo costumes help each dancer show their sense of style and enable them to stand out among a crowd. Dancers can have a new solo costume specially tailored for them with their choice of colours, fabrics, and designs. Popular designers include Gavin Doherty, Conor O’Sullivan, and Elevation. Some dancers will even design the costume themselves. The dancer can also buy second-hand from another dancer. Since the costumes are handmade with pricey materials, unique designs, and are custom measured to each dancer, the costumes can cost between $1,000 and $6,000.

Along with the handcrafted costumes, popular championship costumes include wigs and crowns. In commission schools, female dancers wear a wig. Wigs gained popularity due to their relative ease of use, consistency, and voluminous look when compared to curling one's own natural hair. Dancers get synthetic ringlet wigs that match their hair color or go with an extremely different shade (a blonde dancer wearing a black wig or vice versa). The wigs can range from $75.00 to $150. Usually the crowns match the colours and materials of the dresses, and are made of fabric or metal. The championship competitions are usually danced on stages with a lot of lighting. To prevent looking washed out, and to enhance their leg muscles, dancers often tan their legs. A rule was put in place in January 2005 for Under 10 dancers forbidding them to wear fake tan, and in October 2005 it was decided that Under 12 dancers who were in the Beginner and Primary levels would not be allowed to wear fake tan or make up.

The boys used to wear jackets and kilts, but now more commonly perform in black trousers with a colorful vest or jacket and tie and, more frequently, a vest with embroidery and crystals.

=== Festival costumes ===
The festival style differs, styling more towards a simple unified design, not using much detail or diamonds. Irish dance festivals (also called "shows") have dancers wear their hair either in a wig or down, depending on the age and level of the dancer.

== Shoes ==
Three types of shoes are worn in competitive step dancing: hard shoes and two kinds of soft shoe.

=== Hard shoes ===
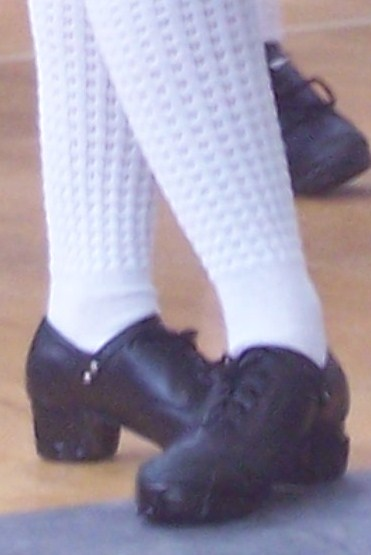
Hard shoes with fiberglass tips

Hard shoes, also known as the heavy shoes or jig shoes, are leather shoes in the style of an Oxford shoe but with a toe piece similar to the cleat on a tap shoe as well an extended heel, both of which enable the production of rhythmic sounds.

Early 20th century dancers used a variety of shoes, including both those made of cowhide, which minimised sound production, and hobnail boots, which produced loud percussive sounds. At this time, it was common for women to perform jigs and hornpipes in ordinary lightweight shoes, because their dances did not involve rhythmic percussion, but from the 1930s onward both men and women began to wear heavy leather shoes. Although in Ireland, hard shoes were used only for heavy jigs and hornpipes, in Australia until the 1950s it was common practice to perform all dances in such heavy shoes.

After An Coimisiún Le Rince Gaelacha banned the use of metal heel or toe pieces in the 1940s, ordinary shoes were modified with nails, coins or gravel in order to improve the clarity of sound and to emphasise the rhythms of the heavy dances. At this time, it was also common for heel and toe pieces to be improvised with several layers of leather stitched together in a tapered shape.

From the 1980s, toe pieces and heels were developed made from fibreglass or plastics, in response to lighter shoe leather with inferior sound production qualities, and with the aim of minimising damage caused to floors by nails. The lightweight nature of such materials allowed dancers to achieve more elevation in their steps, and furthermore enabled entirely new movements to be incorporated into dances, such as pointe work in the balletic style on the very tip of the toe piece. A further innovation, the "bubble heel", which added an inwards protrusion to the hollow plastic heel, created a far louder sound when clicking the heels together than was possible in traditional leather-heeled shoes. An Coimisiún later outlawed bubble heels in competition, but plastic heels continued to enable "click" movements. Dancing en pointe was popularised further by the introduction of shoes with modified, more flexible soles. The sound production qualities of shoes were further augmented by the radio microphones built into the toe for shows such as Riverdance.

At the end of the 20th century, a further development occurred in shoe design: the "flexi" sole, which removed the rigid "spine" from the base of the shoe, in an attempt to enable greater flexibility in the feet. However, concerns were raised by dance regulators that the lack of support would have an adverse impact on dancers' feet. , It is common for an intricate but entirely cosmetic buckle, sometimes in the shape of a shamrock, to be added to hard shoes for competition.

Commercially available hard shoes are priced at between US$100 and $150.

=== Soft shoes ===
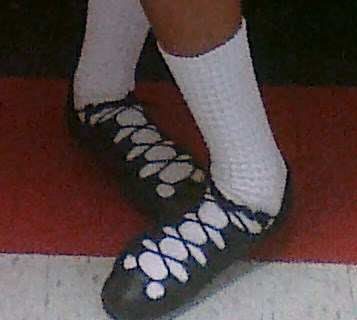
Soft shoes

Until the early 20th century, reels and slip jigs were performed in ordinary walking shoes, as with heavy jigs and hornpipes. Beginning at the dancing competition of the 1924 Tailteann Games in Dublin, a style of ballet pump held on by a looped piece of elastic was introduced for these dances. The increased popularity of these shoes over the following decades contributed to a more balletic style in the slip jig which eventually led to this dance being performed exclusively by women.

In the latter half of the 20th century, the pumps changed to a low cut type with crossed laces similar to the Scottish ghillie. This modern type of shoe, however, differs from the traditional Scottish footwear with a shorter toe box and round laces. A number of variations on this type are available, including variants with softer leather and split soles. This change was motivated by a desire to highlight the position of feet to adjudicators, as the usual black colour of the pumps contrasted with the exposed white of the poodle socks. The flexible nature of these shoes enables rapid and graceful movement as well as elevation in the dancer's performance.

These soft shoes cost around $40 when purchased new.

Until the 1970s, it was common for men to wear the pumps as well, particularly when competing in the slip jig, but at this time, An Coimisiún introduced legislation restricting their use to boys under the age of 11. Consequently, a new style of shoe was adopted for men similar to the contemporary hard shoe, with the toe piece and ankle strap removed but the fibreglass heel retained. This second type of soft shoe, often known as the "reel shoe", is worn exclusively by male dancers, although younger male dancers are occasionally encouraged to begin in jazz shoes which are similar apart from the heel.

== Competitive step dance ==
=== Organisations ===
From the late 1800s, when the Gaelic League began to organise cultural festivals to promote the cause of Irish nationalism, Irish step dance developed a competitive element. Throughout the 20th century, structures for competition developed and spread across the world.

Several organisations, many of which at various stages separated from the Gaelic League's An Coimisiún Le Rincí Gaelacha, independently organise Irish dancing competitions, both in Ireland and elsewhere. In addition to An Coimisiún, Irish step dance is regulated by An Comhdháil na Múinteoirí le Rincí Gaelacha, Cumann Rince Náisiúnta, the World Irish Dance Association, the Festival Irish Dance Teachers Association, and others.

A number of smaller organisations are described as "open platform", meaning that dancers and teachers may affiliate with and compete under other open platform organisations. Open platform organisations also adhere to broad mission statements rather than strict hierarchy, in an attempt to appeal to dance teachers wishing to remain independent. An Coimisiún and An Comhdháil are primarily closed to competitors from other organisations, but operate open platform competitions in areas with fewer members.

=== Accreditation ===
Irish step dance organisations generally require their teachers and adjudicators to be qualified by the governing body. Most follow the structure set by An Coimisiún, the most important qualifications of which are the TCRG (qualification to teach) and the ADCRG (qualification to adjudicate). These qualifications are awarded by examinations which test practical and theoretical knowledge of traditional and original steps for both step dance and ceili dancing. An Comhdháil and some other organisations recognise the qualifications awarded by An Coimisiún, but An Coimisiún only recognises teachers and adjudicators qualified under their own examinations.

=== Events ===
A feis (/ˈfɛʃ/, plural feiseanna) is a competitive step dance event. The word "feis" means "festival" in Irish, and traditionally consists of dancing competitions as well as competition in music and traditional crafts. Many modern feiseanna, however, are solely Irish dancing events. At a feis, several grades of competition are typically offered, in accordance with regional practice and the rules of the governing organisation. These grades may be based on a dancer's level of experience or their previous results in feiseanna. A feis competition is generally judged by between one and three adjudicators, depending on the size of the event and local organisation rules. Dancers compete in sections of one solo dance at a time, and feiseanna may also include competitions for ceili dances.

An oireachtas (plural oireachtais or oireachtasi) or championship competition is a larger and usually annual Irish dancing competition. The first oireachtas, established by the Gaelic League, was inspired by the Welsh eisteddfod and was conceived as an Irish national festival. An oireachtas is often the highest-level competition for a region or country, such as Oireachtas Rince Na hEirann (The All-Ireland Championships) or the North American Irish Dancing Championships. Oireachtais operate at only one level of competition and are judged by multiple adjudicators. In An Coimisiún oireachtais, dancers perform three dances in consecutive rounds and are placed according to their cumulative scores. Like feiseanna, oireachtais may include competitions for ceili dances.

Many of the larger organisations operate an annual World Championships for their organisation's dancers. The largest and oldest of these is An Coimisiún's Oireachtas Rince Na Cruinne, which was established in 1970, and involves up to 3000 competing dancers who have qualified at regional and national oireachtais.

== In performance ==
At the 1897 general meeting of the Gaelic League, displays of dancing were observed to be more popular than the speeches and debates. The public performance of step dance, therefore, evolved with the organisation of social dances as a means for the Gaelic League to ensure both ongoing popularity and financial stability for its revolutionary activities.

Riverdance was the interval act in the 1994 Eurovision Song Contest, held in Dublin, which contributed to the popularity of Irish stepdance, and is still considered a significant watershed in Irish culture. Its roots are in a three-part suite of baroque-influenced traditional music called "Timedance", composed and recorded for the 1981 contest, which was also hosted in Dublin. This first performance featured American-born Irish dancing champions Jean Butler and Michael Flatley, the RTÉ Concert Orchestra and the Celtic choral group Anúna with a score written by Bill Whelan. Riverdance's success includes an eight-week sell out season at Radio City Music Hall, New York, with the sales of merchandise resulting in Radio City Music Hall merchandise sale's record smashed during the first performance, sell-out tours at King's Hall, Belfast, Northern Ireland, and The Green Glens Arena, Millstreet, County Cork, Ireland, plus a huge three and a half-month return to The Apollo in Hammersmith with advance ticket sales of over £5,000,000.

After Flatley left Riverdance, he created other Irish dance shows including Lord of the Dance, Celtic Tiger Live and Feet of Flames, the last-named being an expansion of Lord of the Dance.

== In the media ==
A 2007 RTÉ reality television program, Celebrity Jigs 'n' Reels, combined traditional stepdance with modern music and choreography in a competitive format which paired celebrities with professional dancers. Competitors were judged by well-known stepdancers including Jean Butler and Colin Dunne.

The 2011 Sue Bourne documentary film Jig followed eight dancers as they prepared for An Coimisiún's 2010 World Championships in Glasgow. On its release, the film was praised for attention to technical aspects of stepdance, but criticised for failing to explain the historical and socio-political context of the event.

TLC acquired the rights to the documentary in preparation for a new television show about the competitive Irish stepdance world in America, for which the working title is Irish Dancing Tweens. The series, which will be produced by Sirens Media, features several dance schools. Each episode will focus on individual dancers during rehearsals, preparation, travel, and during competitions. Eight episodes of the series have been ordered.

In 2014, BBC One produced a six-part documentary series called Jigs and Wigs: The Extreme World of Irish Dancing, which featured "the unusual individuals and the stories" of stepdance. The series was noted for its focus on the extreme elements of the modern Irish stepdance world, and the increasing financial pressures on competitors. Reviewers also noted that Jigs and Wigs presented a stepdance world increasingly divorced from perceived Celtic traditions.

== See also ==
- Festival Irish dance
- Sean-nós dance in United States
- Step dance
- The Keltic Dreams

== Bibliography ==
- Brennan, Helen (2001). The Story of Irish Dance. Rowman & Littlefield. ISBN 9781589790032.
- Churchill, Sarah (November 2008). A Challenge to Tradition: Examining the Role of Costume in Contemporary Irish Step Dance (Masters thesis). University of Dublin.
- Cullinane, John P. (1994). Irish dancing costumes: their origins and evolution. Cork City, Ireland: J.P. Cullinane. ISBN 0952795205.
- Lyons, Renée Crichter (2012). The revival of banned dances : a worldwide study. Jefferson, NC: McFarland. ISBN 9780786465941.
- Hall, Frank (2008). Competitive Irish dance : art, sport, duty. Madison, WI: Macater Press. ISBN 9780981492421.
- Meyer, Moe (1995). "Dance and the Politics of Orality: A Study of the Irish "Scoil Rince"". Dance Research Journal. 27 (1): 25–39. doi:10.2307/1478428. JSTOR 1478428.
- Venable, Elizabeth (October 2001). "Inventing Tradition: The Global Development of Irish Dance". In LaPointe-Crump, Janice (ed.). Cord 2001: Transmigratory Moves, Dance in Global Circulation: Conference Proceedings. New York: Congress on Research in Dance. pp. 281–289.
- Whelan, Frank (2000). The Complete Guide to Irish Dance. Belfast: Appletree. ISBN 0862818052.
