= Treble jig =

Irish dance

A treble jig (Irish: port tribile) is an Irish dance which is done in hard shoes. It is also known as the "heavy jig" (as opposed to the light jig, slip jig, single jig, and reel which are done as soft shoes). It is performed to music with a 6/8 time signature. The dance is usually 40 bars to 48 bars in length, but is danced for 32 bars if one is in beginner to prizewinner. The dance is one of the two main hard shoe dances, the other being the hornpipe, and is done by most dancers.

There are fast and slow versions of the treble jig. The fast version is danced by the younger or less advanced dancers and the slow is danced by the more advanced dancers. The fast is actually to fast music with fewer steps. The slow is danced to slow music so that they can fit more steps into it. There are many different versions of this dance.
