= World Irish Dance Association =

- Awards ceremony at the 2013 WIDA World Championships in Düsseldorf

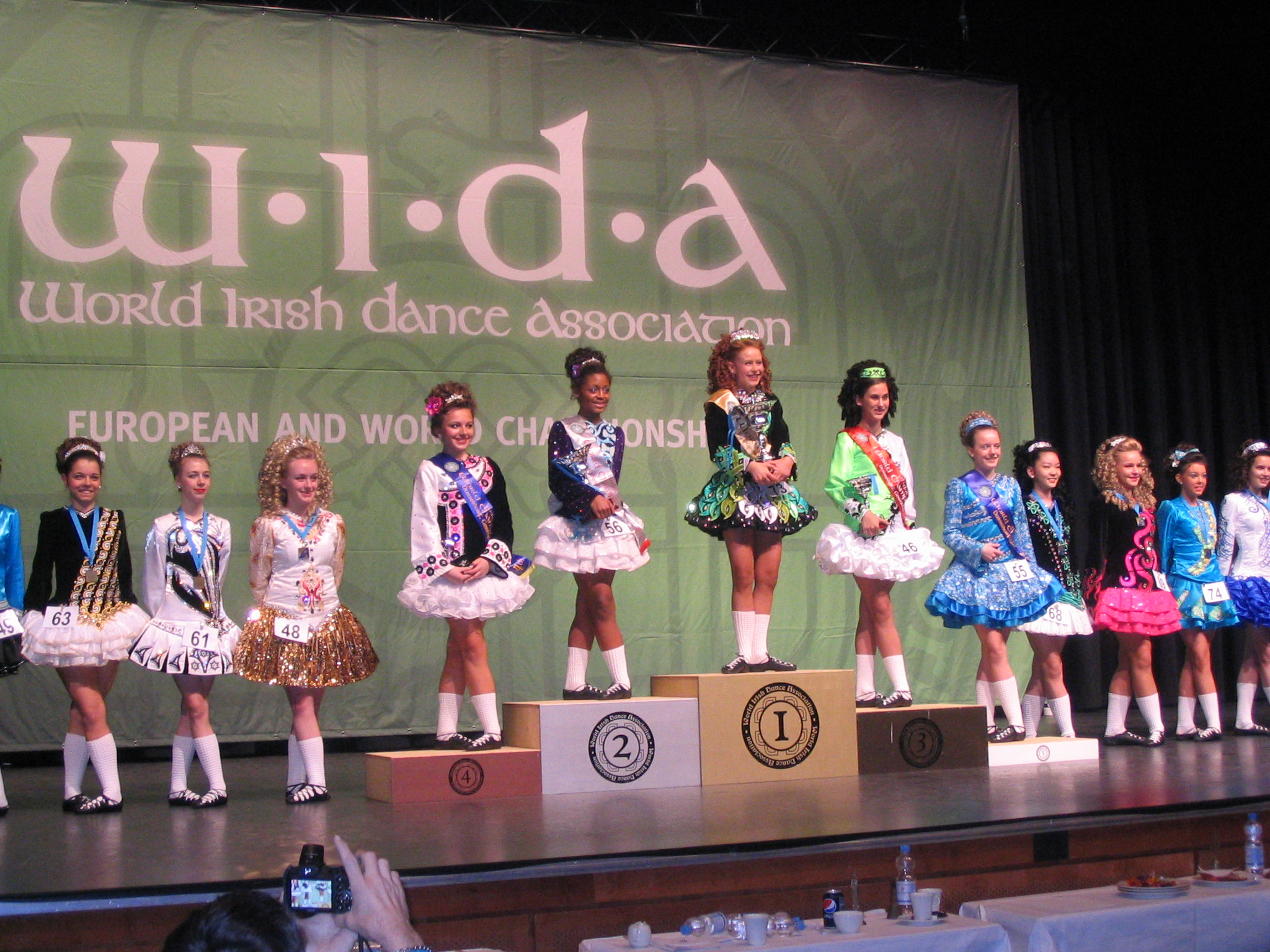
- Sport: Irish stepdance
- Jurisdiction: International
- Abbreviation: WIDA
- Founded: 2004; 22 years ago

Official website
- www.irish.dance

The World Irish Dance Association (WIDA) is an Irish stepdance organisation founded in 2004. It is based primarily in Europe and the United Kingdom, and offers "open platform" competitions that are open to competitors from all Irish dance organisations.

== History ==
WIDA was founded in January 2004 in Düsseldorf, Germany, to cater to a growing number of Irish dance teachers in the European mainland. The demand for Irish dance which prompted WIDA's establishment in Europe had been driven largely by the success of Irish dance stage shows in the 1990s such as Riverdance.

In 2013, WIDA subsumed a number of Irish dance schools in North America previously affiliated with the North American Irish Dance Federation. This substantially increased WIDA's geographic reach beyond Europe for the first time.

WIDA has been praised for its inclusion of adult dancers in competitions, as other Irish stepdance organisations typically offer few competitions for dancers over the age of 25. The inclusion of adult age groups at the WIDA World Championships led to a significant increase in the number of dancers competing. By 2014, there were more than 90 dancers at the Championships over the age of 23, competing in six age groups.

== Rules ==
WIDA is an "open platform" organisation, meaning that their competitions are open to dancers registered under any organisation or without affiliation, and conversely, that their dancers may participate in competitions organised by any other organisation. Furthermore, affiliation with WIDA and other open platform organisations is based on adherence to mission statements and values rather than strict registration, as many open platform dance schools wish to remain relatively independent.

WIDA mandates simple costumes of polo shirts and skirts for dancers under the age of 12 competing in the beginner category. Wigs and other hairpieces are also restricted depending on the ability level. However, in the most advanced levels there are fewer costume restrictions and many dancers wear costumes similar to those worn by An Coimisiún Le Rincí Gaelacha competitors.

== Competitions ==
In continental Europe, WIDA is the only major organiser of Irish dance competitions apart from An Coimisún.

WIDA competitions include four categories of entry: beginner, primary, intermediate and open levels which correspond to the grades used by An Coimisiún and other organisations, and which are open to dancers at that level from any organisation. In regular feiseanna dancers in beginner to intermediate level can also enter a premiership where they dance 2 dances (reel and either light jig/heavy jig depending on level/age) and are adjudicated by 3 judges. Those dancers with at least 4 dances in the open level (including 2 heavy dances) can enter preliminary or open championship where they dance either reel/slip jig and heavy jig/hornpipe and are adjudicated by 3 judges. Once a dancer wins 2 preliminary championships with at least 3 competitors they move up to open championships.

WIDA also operates several oireachtais (championship competitions with multiple adjudicators and rounds of competition) annually in Ireland, Great Britain, Germany, Eastern Europe and the United States.

WIDA is one of six Irish stepdance organisations to operate an annual World Championships event.

== Qualifications ==
WIDA uses a system of examinations and qualifications for its teachers and adjudicators which do not assume any prior knowledge of Irish dance, because many of its members are European natives.
