= Patricia Mulholland =

Irish violinist, choreographer, teacher, and dancer (1915–1992)

- Born: 1915; Belfast, Ireland
- Died: 1992 (aged 76–77)
- Known for: Dance, choreography, music

Patricia Mulholland (1915–1992), was an Irish violinist, choreographer, teacher and dancer.

== Biography ==
Patricia Mulholland was born in Belfast in 1915 on Mileriver Street although her family later moved to Newington Street. Mulholland was a capable violinist and interested in Irish traditional music. Mullholland is considered one of the most influential figures of twentieth-century traditional Irish dancing. One of her dance teachers was Peadar O'Rafferty. Her sister was Belfast dance teacher Stella Mulholland.

Mulholland went on to found the Irish Ballet School in Belfast and the Irish Ballet Company. The Irish Ballet Company made its debut during the Festival of Britain in 1951 at the Empire Theatre in Belfast. Mulholland created her first Irish folk ballet in 1953 at the request of CEMA. She also produced a further group of ballets sponsored by CEMA, including The Piper, The Dream of Angus Óg and Follow Me Down to Carlow. Mulholland's choreographies were not ballet in the classical sense but a form of folk ballet –Irish mythological stories interpreted by Irish dancers to Irish music and song. She published a book of Ulster Dances in 1971.

Mulholland received an honorary master's degree from Queen's University Belfast in 1975 at the same time as her long-term collaborator Mercy Hunter. The artist Basil Blackshaw painted her likeness in 1975. She is commemorated with a Blue Plaque at Brookvale Drive in North Belfast in 2015. The most famous of her students is the actor Ciaran Hinds.

== Choreography ==
- The Mother of Oisín
- The Black Rogue
- the Oul' Lammas Fair in 1900
- The Children of Lír
- Phil the Fluter's Ball
- The Hound of Culann
