= The Keltic Dreams =

Irish dancing troupe

The Keltic Dreams are an Irish dancing troupe based in PS 059 (The Community School of Technology) in the Bronx, New York City. They are led by Dublin-raised Caroline Duggan, who moved to New York after graduating from Trinity College, Dublin to become a music teacher. The troupe consists of boys and girls ages between 7-11 in elementary school. They have performed for the senator of Newark, on The Late Late Show in Ireland, the New York City St. Patrick's Day Parade, and the St. Patrick's Day Parade in Queens, New York City. They have performed in Chicago and Boston as well.

Local boxing events were held to help raise funding to send the troupe to perform in Ireland in 2007. They also received $33,000 from the American-Ireland fund and $10,000 from John McColgan, the producer of Riverdance and The Pirate Queen, pieces from which the group often performs. A documentary about the group, A Bronx Dream, has been broadcast on Showtime in the US. In Ireland, they performed at Dublin's St. Stephen's Green shopping center and for Irish President Mary McAleese.

They were the recipient of the first "Building Bridges" award at the Irish Connections Festival near Boston in June 2006. The award honors an individual representing the spirit of the festival in exploring connections between ethnic communities in the United States.
