= Fulham Baths =

Building in Fulham, London, England

Coordinates: 51.481157°N 0.19945487°W

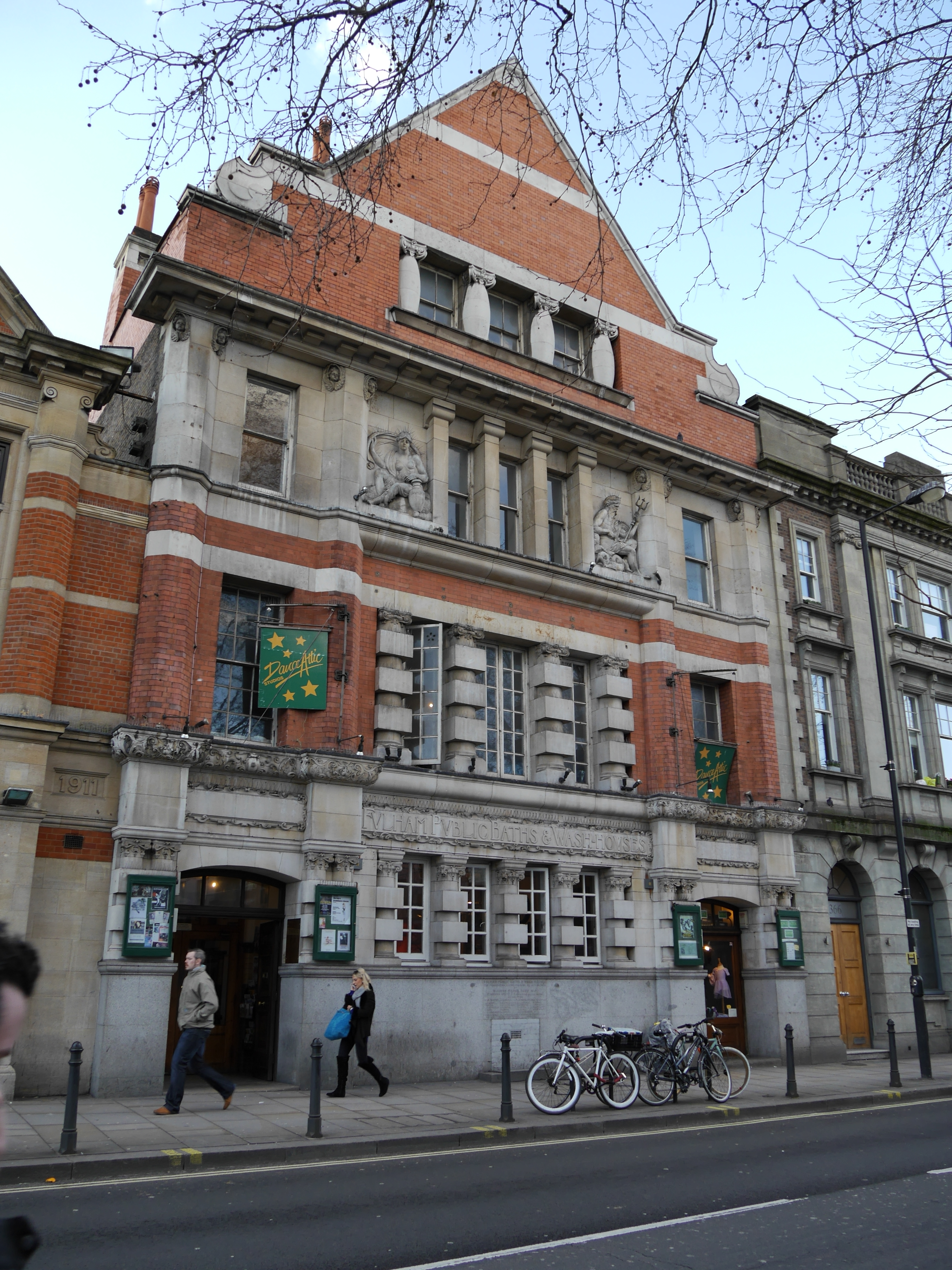
Fulham Baths

Fulham Public Baths and Washhouses is a Grade II listed building at 368 North End Road, Fulham, London SW6.

It began construction in 1899, compelled by the Baths and Washhouses Act 1846 (9 & 10 Vict. c. 74), that permitted use of public funds for the construction along with a campaign of using cleanliness to fight diseases like cholera. its creation at first was up to debate at first, with the vestry having to be convinced that the bathhouse would pay for itself, and its construction was eventually approved. finishing construction in 1902. Designed by the architect H. Deighton Pearson. As part of a Design competition, held in Fulham Town Hall in 1899. The design includes small statues depicting Poseidon and Amphitrite, each being Greek god and goddess of the sea.

The foundation stone was laid on 30 October 1900, naming the people who would help make the baths creation possible, including the vestry, builders, the architect and Hayes Fisher, 1st Baron Downham, who represented Fulham in the house of commons at the time.

The building was a regular use public service used by both high and low class members of the local community, being a place where those would clean themselves and their clothing. at time of completion the building held 84 private slipper baths and three large swimming baths, also a washhouse for people to wash clothing.

In 1979 the baths were closed due to safety concerns, leading to 74 year old Widow Alice Davies to move in as part of a campaign to keep the baths open, evading police trying to remove her for the demolition, she finally was escorted out of the building in November 1980.

After demolition most of the site was emptied except for the front façade which was left virtually untouched.

It is now the Dance Attic Rehearsal Studios.

== Design & Layout ==
Private baths
Gender Distribution	1st Class	2nd class	Total
Men's	18	41	59
Women's	10	15	25
Both	28	56	84

Swimming baths
Gender & Class Distribution	length	width	Depth
Women's swimming bath	60ft	20ft	6ft.6in
Men's 1st class swimming bath	100ft	30ft	6ft.6in
Men's 2nd class swimming bath	125ft	33ft	6ft.6in
