= Comhdháil na Múinteoirí le Rincí Gaelacha =

Global governing body for Irish stepdance

An Comhdháil Na Rince Gaelacha
- Sport: Irish stepdance
- Jurisdiction: International
- Founded: 1970; 56 years ago
- President: Collette McGee
- Chairperson: Matthew Donohoe

Official website
- www.irishdancingorg.com

Comhdháil na Múinteoirí le Rincí Gaelacha (English: The Congress of Irish Dance Teachers (Note: A number of sources, such as Cullinane 2016 and Foley 2016 translate the organisation's title as The Irish Dancing Teachers' Conference, but this article uses the English name adopted by An Comhdhail's own publications.)), also referred to as An Chomhdháil (the Congress), is a global governing body for Irish stepdance. Founded in the early 1960s, and then breaking from An Coimisiún Le Rincí Gaelacha to become an independent organisation, An Chomhdháil is today the second-largest Irish dance organisation and one of six to run a World Championships competition.

An Chomhdháil operates a system of examinations for the registration of teachers and adjudicators, and regulates Irish stepdance at its hierarchical system of competitions held across the world. It emphasises a democratic approach to this governance and represents the interests of Irish dancing teachers in its decision-making processes.

== History ==
Prior to the establishment of An Coimisiún Le Rincí Gaelacha in 1927 by the Gaelic League, with its goal of unifying and controlling Irish dance across Ireland, various organisations of Irish dance teachers had existed in the major cities of Ireland. The oldest among them, the Cork Irish Dance Teachers' Association, was founded in 1895 and played a key role in the establishment of the first oireachtas of the Gaelic League. Another, the Leinster Dance Teachers' Association, was founded in Dublin in 1924, but both associations were more or less defunct by the early 1930s.

In its early years of existence, An Coimisiún began to develop a system of examinations, centralised registration of teachers and a hierarchical competition structure. However, because the organisation was a component of the Gaelic League's nationalist agenda, there was little to no representation of dance teachers' interests within its decision-making processes. As a consequence, from 1961 onwards, dance teachers began to organise their own regular democratic conventions and protocols.

Early conventions dealt largely with technical matters such as the regulation of shoes and dances, and throughout the 1960s, submitted its decisions to An Coimisiún, where they were largely accepted and made official. As a result, by the later years of the decade, most teachers of Irish dance registered with An Coimisiún had also registered with the dance teachers' organisations. The combined local teachers' associations which led this movement were collectively known as the Irish Dancing Teachers' Association, until the 1967 convention when a new constitution was drafted under the name of Comhdháil Múinteori Na Rinci Gaelach.

Beginning at the 1967 convention, later to become known as the Gormanston Convention for its location at Gormanston College in County Meath, An Chomhdháil began attempts to increase its standing within the An Coimisiún structure, including structural representation and compulsory dual registration for all of An Coimisiún's certified teachers. This quickly developed into significant tension between the organisations and resulted in further moves by An Chomhdháil to assert its autonomy, including registering teachers in North America.

At around the same time, An Coimisiún began to experiment with delegating its authority to regional councils, restructuring the Ulster Commission, which had previously functioned with limited autonomy in organising Irish Dancing in the Ulster region, to deal with concerns being raised about a feis held in Northern Ireland. This incident, along with increasing dissent with An Coimisiún's nationalist agenda and autocratic structure, led to the complete breakdown of relations between the two organisations. As a result, in 1969, a special convention of An Chomhdháil was called to discuss the teachers' dissatisfaction with An Coimisiún's attempts to extend its power, and a vote was carried 91 to 2, with 31 abstentions, to separate from An Coimisiún entirely. At the end of that year, all teachers were forced to register either with An Coimisiún or An Chomhdháil.

This event was to become known as "the Split", and had a significant impact on An Coimisiún, with the loss of nearly half of its registered teachers within Ireland. (Note: In the latter half of the 20th century, and partly as a result of this event, An Coimisiún increased the representation of dance teachers substantially so they composed an overwhelming majority of representatives.)

By early 1970, An Chomhdháil had created its own register of teachers and adjudicators, and in the following years quickly implemented a system of examinations similar to that of An Coimisiún. Gradually, its teachers began to establish their own feiseanna.

In 1982, Cumann Rince Náisiúnta was formed by a group of 12 teachers dissatisfied with the activities of An Chomhdháil. An Chomhdháil consequently closed its platform of competitions, which had previously been open to any dancer registered with any organisation, to be open only to dancers affiliated with An Chomhdháil teachers.

The cultural impact of the Riverdance performance at the 1994 Eurovision Song Contest saw a significant increase in Irish dancing participation, as well as contributing to the globalisation of the competitive structure. An Chomhdháil saw an increase in its competition numbers comparable with those of other extant stepdance organisations. However, it also adopted a role as one of the two most important organisations for the training and preparation of professional dancers. The popularity of Irish dance shows quickly created an additional motivation for success in competitive Irish dance.

A 2007 rule change banned the use of makeup for competitors under the age of 13, in response to broad criticism of Irish stepdance generally for its dependence on costuming and appearance.

In 2012, An Chomhdháil began to market its largest competition as the "World Irish Dance Championships", to compete with the larger Oireachtas Rince na Cruinne (Irish Dancing World Championships) event held by An Coimisiún. Its entries were composed largely of dancers from Ireland and the United Kingdom.

An Chomhdháil struggled to make an initial impression on the American continent, with very few registered teachers in its North American region, and the first feis affiliated with An Chomhdháil in the United States was not held until June 2013 in California. Over the following years, five further annual feiseanna were introduced in North America. The North American region was also divided into two to cater for the increased number of registered teachers.

In 2017, An Chomhdháil's World Championships were expanded to use two competition stages for the first time, in response to a record number of entries in both solo and ceili dance events. By this time, the Worlds had begun to attract dancers from a wider region of the globe.

== Operations ==
There are 28 branches of An Chomhdháil, each of which is individually responsible for promoting and organising Irish dance in its region.

- Americas (Branch of the)
- Australia
- Belfast
- Belfast Regional
- Belgium
- Channel Islands
- Connaught
- Cork
- Derry/Donegal
- Dublin
- East European Slovakia
- Finland
- Israel
- Japan
- Laois
- London & Home Counties
- Midlands
- Mid-Ulster
- Newry
- Scotland
- South Derry/South West Antrim
- South Leinster
- Southern England Region
- UAE
- USA
- Waterford
- West Tyrone
- Wicklow

An Chomhdháil is governed by its annual Convention, held in August, at which all registered teachers and adjudicators may vote on rule changes. It also has an executive committee and Panel of Examiners which oversee its day-to-day operations and examination system respectively.

== Examinations ==
An Chomhdháil shares with An Coimisiún a rigorous system of examinations for the certification of dance teachers and adjudicators, and also shares the terminology used to describe the qualifications. Furthermore, An Chomhdháil accepts teachers and adjudicators who have received equivalent qualifications from another organisation. The qualifications available are:

- Teastais de Comhdháil na Rince Gaelacha (TCRG) – qualified to teach in An Comhdháil registered schools. (An Coimisiún equivalent: Teastais de Coimisiún na Rince Gaelacha)
- Ard Diploma na Comhdháil na Rince Gaelacha (ADCRG) – qualified to adjudicate An Comhdháil registered competitions. (An Coimisiún equivalent: Ard Diploma de Coimisiún na Rince Gaelacha)
- Muinteoir Rince Gaelacha – qualified to teach ceili dances only. (An Coimisún equivalent: TMRF)

There is also a system of 10 examinations for competing dancers over the age of 8, which test practical and theoretical knowledge and provide additional feedback for participants.

== Competitions ==
An Chomhdháil's operations are based around a hierarchical system of competition, mirroring that of An Coimisiún and other organisations.

Competitions organised by An Chomhdháil promote a larger number of traditional set dances, that is, dances to specified tunes which are relatively consistent in their choreography, than other organisations. (Note: Set dances in the step dancing sense are unrelated to set dance, a social form of Irish dance.)

An Chomhdháil is one of six Irish stepdance organisation to host a World Championships event. Like An Coimisiún's Oireachtas Rince na Cruinne, An Chomhdháil's World Championships are held annually at Easter.

== Bibliography ==
- Cullinane, John (2016). Aspects of the History of the World Irish Dancing Championships. Cork City: John P. Cullinane.
- Cullinane, John (2003). An Coimisiún le Rincí Gaelacha (Irish Dancing Commission) : its origins and evolution. Cork City, Ireland: John Cullinane. ISBN 0952795248.
- Venable, Elizabeth (October 2001). "Inventing Tradition: The Global Development of Irish Dance". In LaPointe-Crump, Janice (ed.). Cord 2001: Transmigratory Moves, Dance in Global Circulation: Conference Proceedings. New York: Congress on Research in Dance. pp. 281–289 – via Scribd.
- Venable, Elizabeth (March 2008). Dresses and Messages: Commodifications of Irish Dancing (Master of Arts thesis). University of California – via Scribd.
