= Slip jig =

Style of Irish music and dance

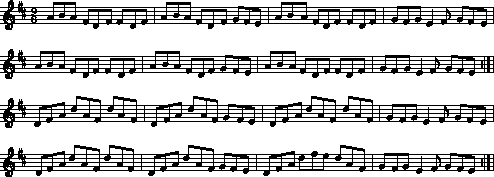
Music for the slip jig "Drops of brandy"

Slip jig (Irish: port luascach, port luascadh) refers to both a style within Irish music, and the Irish dance to music in slip-jig time originating from England. The slip jig is in 9/8 time, traditionally with accents on 5 of the 9 beats — two pairs of crotchet/quaver (quarter note/eighth note) followed by a dotted crotchet note.

The slip jig is one of the four most common Irish stepdances, the others being the reel, the jig and the hornpipe. It is danced in soft shoes. At one time only men danced it, then for several decades only women, and today slip jigs can be danced by any dancer, though at a competitive level they are almost exclusively danced by women. This dance is graceful and controlled, with heels very high, often called "the ballet of Irish dance". There are also traditional Irish céilí dances which are slip jigs, though these are much less common than reels and double jigs.

Because of its timing, the slip jig is longer than the reel for the same number of bars of music. In Irish stepdance competition, the tempo of 113 beats per minute is the same as other dances, but as each bar is longer, instead of dancing to 48 bars of music the dancer is only required to dance 40 bars of music (each of 2 1/2 steps). Stepdance judges prefer sliding motions with the feet and graceful movements that seem to slip across the floor.

Slip jig timing can also be used for strip the willow dances in céilidh folk dance, although the fact that most social dancers do not dance the step limits its use in set dance and ceili dance socially. The tunes are fast-paced and lively in contrast to the slower Irish stepdance tunes.

== Example ==
Music of the slip jig "Drops of brandy":

== Other dances ==
Other dances in 9/8 time are the Scottish Lilt in Highland dancing and the karsilama of Turkish dance.
