= An Coimisiún Le Rincí Gaelacha =

Governing body for Irish step dancing

- Sport: Irish step dance
- Jurisdiction: International
- Abbreviation: CLRG
- Founded: 1927; 99 years ago
- Headquarters: Dublin, Ireland
- President: Seamus O'Sé
- Chairperson: Sandra Connick

Official website
- www.clrg.ie

An Coimisiún Le Rincí Gaelacha (CLRG, English:The Irish Dancing Commission) is the oldest and largest governing body for competitive Irish step dancing globally. Founded in 1927, CLRG is responsible for creating a standardised system of Irish dance, music and competition for its member organisations in 26 countries. It organises Oireachtas Rince na Cruinne (the World Championships) as well as Oireachtas Rince na hÉireann (the All Ireland Championships), and is the central authority for teacher and adjudicator accreditation. It is headquartered in Dublin, Ireland.

== History ==
In 1927, Conradh na Gaelige, an organisation dedicated to promoting the Irish language, organised a Commission of Enquiry "for the purpose of examining the organisation of Irish dancing as it existed at that time and to make recommendations as to how it might be better organised in the future. The Commission's stated aim was to unify the various interests involved in Irish dancing and pursue the common goal of promoting the cultural heritage of dance in Ireland. In 1930, the Commission presented its recommendations, and Conradh na Gaelige established An Coimisiún as a permanent body to carry out those recommendations.

The CLRG board was initially made up of 3 delegates from the Dublin Irish Dance Teachers, 3 from the Irish Music Society, and 18 delegates from Conradh na Gaelige. This under-representation of dancing teachers was to cause problems within the first few decades of CLRG's existence.

In 1939, CLRG published the first edition of Ár Rince Foirne (Our Team Dances), an official handbook for the teaching and learning of ceili (social) dances. This was to become standard knowledge for CLRG registered teachers. On its first register of qualifications, CLRG listed 32 teachers from across Ireland. By 1943, a standard system of certification had been introduced in order to organise the training of new teachers and adjudicators.

In 1969, a group of Irish dance teachers, frustrated with what they perceived to be a lack of influence in the growing organisation, broke from CLRG and formed Comhdháil na Múinteoirí le Rincí Gaelacha (The Congress of Irish Dance Teachers) to compete with CLRG. These two organisations remain the most significant in Irish dancing, although CLRG is considerably larger and more highly gloablised. One enduring legacy of "the Split" is that CLRG competitions are open only to dancers from CLRG, and CLRG registered dancers are forbidden from competing with other "open-platform" organisations. (An Chomhdháil was originally open-platform, but later became closed after a breakaway from its own ranks.)

Following the Split, CLRG decided to host Oireachtas Rince na Cruinne (the World Championships) for the first time in 1970. The first championships took place at the auditorium of Coláiste Mhuire, a school in Dublin.

The next important development in Irish dance came with the 1994 Eurovision launch of Riverdance. This event, followed by the continuing success of the Irish dance troupe, led to a massive increase in global interest for Irish dance. Over the following 20 years, the number of competitors at the World Championships increased dramatically, and the percentage of dancers from outside Ireland and the U.K. lifted to nearly 50%. The rapid increase in the number of dancers across the world accelerated the globalisation, and led to the election of Peter Smith in 2004 as the first president resident outside Ireland.

By 1999, there were approximately 500 dance teachers registered with CLRG in Ireland and 600 in other countries.

Through the early 2000s, CLRG faced criticism for failing to address the increasing influence of other dance styles on traditional Irish dance. The introduction of movements from Spanish flamenco, ballet and other styles led to concerns about the erosion of traditional Irish culture. Costumes also became more relaxed and modern following the popularity of shows such as Riverdance. Particularly controversial was the use in competition of tight curled wigs, fake tan and crystal embellishment, ostensibly to draw attention to a dancer on stage. Some have criticised this movement as representing an oversexualisation of dancers.

A heavily revised and updated ceili handbook, renamed to Ar Rince Ceili (Our Ceili Dances), was also released in 2014. This coincided with a revised set of rules for dancers and teachers as well as the introduction of a grade exam system for dancers. The new rules included a prohibition on the use of makeup or false eyelashes in competition for dancers under the age of 10, as well as a restriction on "carriage aids", which assisted competitors to maintain a rigid posture.

CLRG estimated that some 250,000 dancers were taught under its jurisdiction by 2014.

In 2022, allegations of widespread "feis fixing" involving CLRG teachers and adjudicators manipulating results at major competitions were leaked after being submitted to CLRG's Coiste Faire (ethics committee). CLRG stated that appointed a former Court of Appeal judge to investigate the allegations and would take action against members found to have breached its policies.

== Organisation structure ==
CLRG operates in 25 geographic regions. Each of these regions is administered by a Regional Authority reporting to CLRG, and hosts a qualifying event for Oireachtas Rince Na Cruinne. In Australia and North America, multiple regions are combined under a single regional authority, as follows.

=== Australia ===
Australian Irish Dancing Association (AIDA)

- NSW
- Victoria
- Queensland
- ACT
- South Australia
- Western Australia

=== North America ===
North American Feis Commission/Irish Dancing Teachers Association of North America (IDTANA)

- Mid Atlantic
- Mid America
- Western US
- Eastern Canada
- Western Canada
- New England
- Southern US

=== Great Britain ===
- Scotland
- England — Midlands
- England — North-West
- England — North-East
- England — South

=== Ireland ===
- Connaght
- Leinster
- Munster
- Ulster

=== Rest of the world ===
- New Zealand: Traditional Irish Dance Association of New Zealand
- Regional Council of Irish dancing teachers for Continental Europe and Asia (RCCEA)
  - Austria, Belgium, Croatia, Czech Republic, Denmark, France, Finland, Germany, Hungary, Israel, Italy, Netherlands, Norway, Poland, Portugal, Romania, Serbia, Slovak Republic, Spain, Switzerland, Hong Kong, Japan, Qatar, Taiwan, United Arab Emirates, Russia
- South Africa
- South America: S.A.I.D.A. (South American Irish Dance Association)

== Competition structure ==
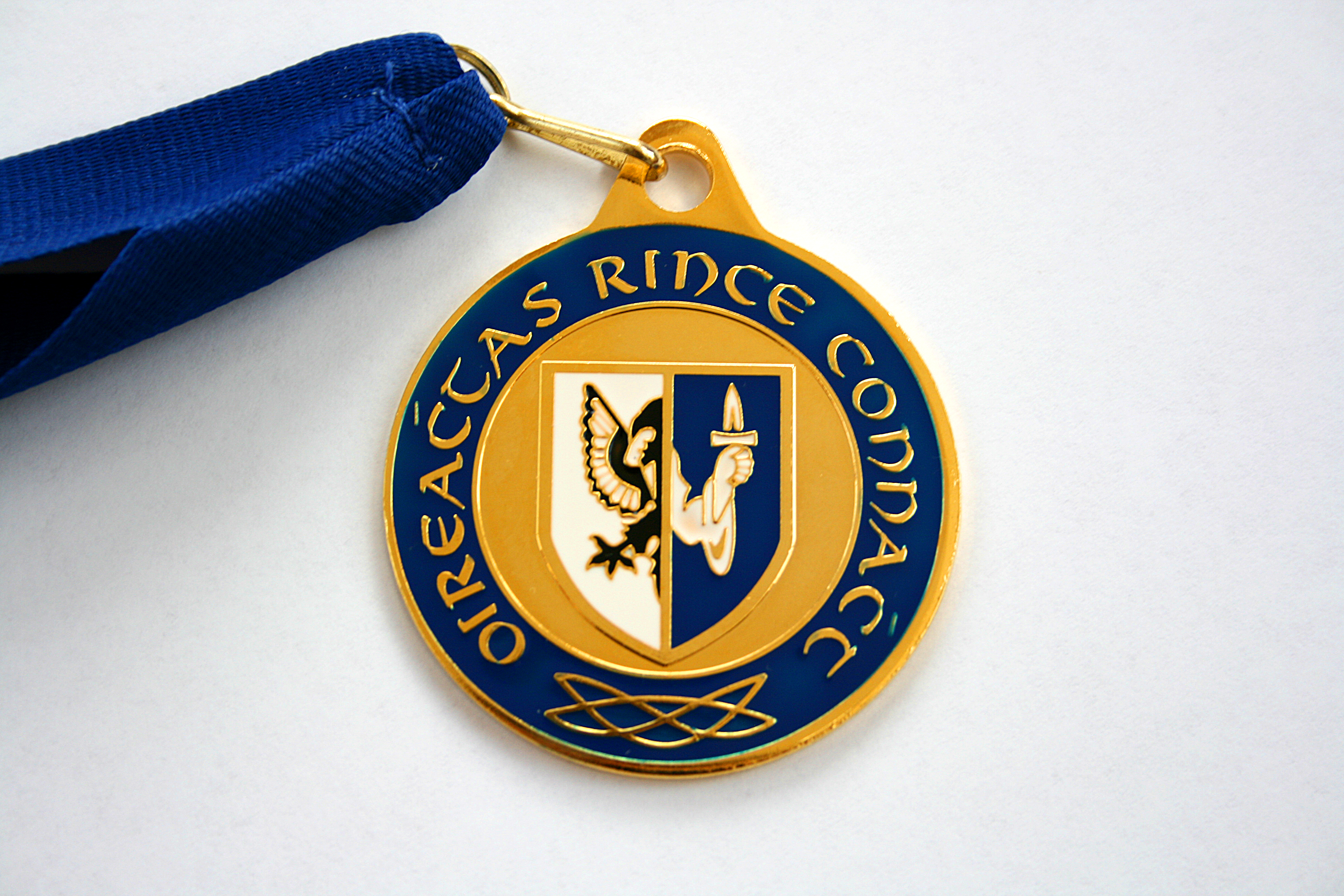
A medal awarded to qualifiers for Oireachtas Rince na Cruinne at the Connacht Championships

CLRG organises two major competitions each year: Oireachtas Rince Na Cruinne (the World Championships) and Oireachtas Rince na hÉireann (the All Ireland Championships). Oireachtas (plural: Oireachtais) is the Gaelic term for championship, and in CLRG competition refers to a three-round competition marked by at least three adjudicators. Apart from this, competitions are organised by Regional Authorities and registered with CLRG.

The most significant of these are the annual Regional Championships, which are the primary qualifying events for the World Championships. The larger Regional Authorities also hold secondary qualifying events, such as the North American National Championships, the Great Britain Championships, the All Ireland Championships, and the Australian Championships. Dancers may qualify for the World Championships at either a primary or secondary qualifying event, but if they qualify at a secondary event they must dance (or have danced) in the primary qualifier to remain eligible.

Each region also hosts a number of other competitions throughout the year, known as feisanna. These events range in scale and structure from small local competitions with a single adjudicator to large oireachtais in the style of Worlds qualifying events.

=== Oireachtas Rince na Cruinne ===
The Irish Dancing World Championships (often known simply as the Worlds) are held annually in Easter Week. Until 1999, the Championships were held permanently in Ireland. Since 2000, however, they have been held in a number of countries each year, and have taken place in Northern Ireland, Scotland, England, the United States and Canada. The Championships are open to dancers who have qualified at Regional Championships in the calendar year following the previous Worlds.

The World Championships have a similar structure to regional championships: there are separate competitions for solo and ceili (team) dancing, divided by age group. Solo competition takes place across three rounds, typically in front of a rotating panel of adjudicators. Ceili competition includes both traditional ceili dances (as outlined in Ar Rince Ceilí) and Own Choreography sections. The largest Own Choreography section, the Figure Dance, is for up to 16 dancers, must portray "an Irish theme or legend" and is considered the most prestigious team event in Irish dancing.

The championships involve about 5,000 dancers from across CLRG's regions each year. Past and future host cities of the World Championships include:

Oireachtas Rince Na Cruinne has been described as the "Olympics of Irish dance", and as a "vital boost" to city economies because of the 15,000 visitors it brings to the host city. The 2018 event in Glasgow was estimated by city officials to represent a £14,000,000 contribution to the local economy. A competitive tendering process is in place for determining future host cities of the championships.

== Examinations and accreditation ==
CLRG organises grade exams for dancers and accreditation exams for teachers and adjudicators. The teaching and adjudicating qualifications are recognised globally by CLRG, and are also recognised by certain other dance organisations.

There are 12 dance exam grades (and a preliminary grade). Candidates must demonstrate proficiency in a variety of solo and ceilí dances, and are marked on timing, footwork, execution and carriage, as in competition. On completion of all 12 grades, dancers are awarded The Diploma of the Irish Dancing Commission.

The teaching and adjudicating qualifications are as follows:

- TMRF – qualified to teach ceili (teams) dancing. Must be at least 20 years old and pass written and practical exams.
- TCRG (Teagascóir Coimisiún Le Rinci Gaelacha) – the "teacher" qualification. Qualified to teach both solo and ceili dancing. Must be at least 20 years old and pass written and practical exams in dancing, music and the Gaelic language. From 2018, must also have completed all 12 grades of practical dance exam.
- ADCRG (Ard Diploma Coimisiún Le Rincí Gaelacha) – the "adjudicator" qualification. As well as teaching, qualified to adjudicate at any CLRG-recognised competition. Must be at least 30, have held TCRG qualification for at least 5 years, and pass further written and practical exams.
- SDCRG (Scrúdaithoir Coimisiún Le Rincí Gaelacha) – the "examiner" qualification. As well and teaching and adjudicating, qualified to examine candidates for dance grades, TCRG and ADCRG.

== Bibliography ==
- Cullinane, John (2003). An Coimisiún Le Rince Gaelacha: its origins and evolution. Dublin: Dr John P. Cullinane. ISBN 0-9527952-4-8.
- Venable, Elizabeth (March 2008). Dresses and Messages: Commodifications of Irish Dancing (Master of Arts thesis). University of California – via Scribd.
