= Superstars of Dance =

- Genre: Reality
- Created by: Nigel Lythgoe
- Presented by: Michael Flatley; Susie Castillo
- Judges: Maria Pogee; Shirish Dayal; Kelley Abbey; Harold Van Buuren; Tony Selznick; Daire Nolan; Mikhail Smirnov; Master Haiyang Wang
- Narrated by: Joe Cipriano
- Country of origin: United States
- Original language: English
- No. of seasons: 1
- No. of episodes: 5

Production
- Executive producers: Nigel Lythgoe; Simon Fuller
- Production locations: Hollywood, California
- Running time: 85–90 minutes

Original release
- Network: NBC
- Release: January 4 – January 26, 2009

Superstars of Dance is an American reality television series that aired on NBC from January 4 to 26, 2009. The series features dance routines from eight countries from six continents. It was hosted by Michael Flatley, co-creator of Riverdance and creator of Lord of the Dance, and was co-hosted by former Miss USA title holder Susie Castillo. It was created by executive producers Nigel Lythgoe and Simon Fuller, co-producers of So You Think You Can Dance and American Idol.

== Background ==
On November 17, 2008, NBC announced it had ordered a new reality program titled Superstar Dancers of the World, which would feature competitors from eight international teams and would be produced by Simon Fuller and Nigel Lythgoe of American Idol fame. NBC billed the show as "equal parts sporting event, rock concert, and artistic exhibition" and Lythgoe called it "the most challenging and exhilarating project I've ever done."

Superstars of Dance differed from similar TV dance competitions by featuring professionals instead of amateurs, including several world champions. The contestants were chosen by their respective countries, rather than by the show's producers. Flatley compared the show to a sporting competition such as the Olympic Games.

The winners were decided by a panel of eight judges, as the producers felt it would be unfair to decide the winner by phone-in votes, assuming the American public would probably just vote for the American team.

=== The teams ===
Team/Country	Soloists	Duet	Group	Coach
Argentina	Carolina Cerisola, Miriam Larici	**Miriam Larici & Leonardo Barrionuevo**	Los Huincas Gauchos	Sandar
India	Amrapali Ambegaokar, Mythili Prakash	Nishi Munshi & Sangita Sanyal	Bollywood Dancers	Nakul Dev Mahajan
Australia	Sean Robinson, Reed Luplau	Henry Byalikov & Giselle Peacock	Australian Dance Theatre	Jason Gilkison, Garry Stewart
South Africa	Sduduzo Ka-Mbili, Mamela Nyanza	Victor Da Silva & Claudia Savvides	Umojo	Tandinkosi "Tandi" Bhengu
USA	Robert Muraine, Dormeshia Sumbry-Edwards	Georgia Ambarian & Eric Luna	**Groovaloos**	Marguerite Derricks
Ireland	Damien O'Kane^{†}, Kelly Hendry	Damien O'Kane & Bernadette Flynn	Irish Stepdancing Team (from Lord of the Dance)	Marie Duffy Pask
Russia	Julia Bantner, **Maria Kochetkova**	Anya Garnis & Pasha Kovalev‡	The Cossacks	Stanislav Issaev
China	Bei Zheng, Yang Yanan	Zhen Zhu Zheng & An Na	Shaolin: Wheel of Life	Matthew Ahmet

^{†}Damien O'Kane was replaced by Bernadette Flynn for the semi-final round of the competition.
^{‡}Pasha Kovalev and Anya Garnis was replaced by Pasha & Aliona Riazantsev for the semi-final round of the competition
Competitors in bold won their respective categories.

=== The judges ===
Team/Country	Judge
Argentina	Maria Pogee
India	Shirish Dayal
Australia	Kelley Abbey
South Africa	Harold Van Buuren
USA	Tony Selznick
Ireland	Daire Nolan
Russia	Mikhail Smirnov
China	Master Wang Haiyang

== Episode 1 ==
The first episode was aired on Sunday, January 4, 2009.

Country	Dancers/Style	Judges' Scores								Totals			Grand Total
Country	Dancers/Style	(Argentina)	(India)	(Australia)	(South Africa)	(United States)	(Republic of Ireland)	(Russia)	(China)	Solo	Duet	Group	Grand Total
Argentina	Carolina Cerisola (Jazz Solo); Miriam Larici & Leonardo Barrionuevo (Tango Duet)	N/A	8; 9	8; 9	7; 10	9; 10	9; 9	9; 9	8; 9	58	65	N/A	123
India	Nishi Munshi & Sangita Sanyal (Bollywood Duet); Amarpali Ambegaokar (Kathak Solo)	9; 9	N/A	7; 9	6; 8	7; 9	7; 9	8; 9	7; 9	62	51	N/A	113
Australia	Sean Robinson (Tap Solo); Australian Dance Theater (Group)	9; 9	8; 8	N/A	8; 9	8; 8	8; 7	8; 8	8; 8	57	N/A	57	114
South Africa	Umojo (Gumboot Dance Group); Sduduzo Ka-Mbili (Zulu Dancer Solo)	8; 8	8; 8	9; 7	N/A	8; 9	8; 7	8; 8	8; 8	55	N/A	57	112
USA	Robert Muraine (Popping Solo); Georgia Ambarian & Eric Luna (Cabaret Duet)	8; 7	7; 9	9; 7	9; 7	N/A	8; 10	8; 9	8; 8	57	57	N/A	114
Ireland	Irish Stepdancing (Group); Damien O'Kane (Irish Step Dance Solo)	10; 9	9; 9	9; 8	9; 7	10; 8	N/A	9; 8	9; 9	58	N/A	65	123
Russia	Pasha Kovalev & Anya Garnis (Latin Ballroom Duet); Julia Bantner (Contemporary Solo)	8; 7	9; 7	9; 7	9; 7	10; 7	10; 8	N/A	9; 7	50	64	N/A	114
China	Bei Zheng (Ribbon Solo); Shaolin Monks (Group)	8; 9	7; 9	7; 10	7; 10	8; 10	7; 9	7; 9	N/A	51	N/A	66	117

== Episode 2 ==
The second episode of Superstars of Dance aired on January 5, 2009. The show marked the end of the quarterfinals and with it the first eliminations. At the end of the evening, eight soloists, two duos, and two groups were eliminated.

Country	Dancers/Style	Judges' Scores								Totals			Grand Total
Country	Dancers/Style	(Argentina)	(India)	(Australia)	(South Africa)	(United States)	(Republic of Ireland)	(Russia)	(China)	Solo	Duet	Group	Grand Total
Argentina	Los Huincas Gauchos (Group); Miriam Larici (Tango-style Solo)	N/A	7; 8	7; 8	6; 8	7; 8	6; 8	8; 9	7; 8	57	N/A	48	105
India	Mythili Prakash (Bharata-Natyam Solo); Bollywood Dancers (Group)	9; 7	N/A	8; 8	8; 7	9; 9	8; 8	8; 7	8; 8	58	N/A	54	112
Australia	Henry Byalikov & Giselle Peacock (Ballroom duet); Reed Luplau (Contemporary solo)	8; 9	8; 10	N/A	8; 9	8; 9	8; 9	8; 10	8; 9	65	56	N/A	121
South Africa	Victor Da Silva & Claudia Savvides (Ballroom duet); Mamela Nyamza (Afro-fusion solo)	8; 9	8; 8	8; 9	N/A	9; 8	8; 8	9; 8	9; 8	58	59	N/A	117
USA	Dormeshia Sumbry-Edwards (Tap Solo); The Groovaloos (Street dance group)	7; 9	8; 9	8; 10	7; 10	N/A	9; 9	8; 10	8; 10	55	N/A	67	122
Ireland	Kelly Hendry (Irish step dance solo); Damien O'Kane & Bernadette Flynn (Irish step dance duet)	8; 8	8; 8	8; 8	8; 8	8; 8	N/A	8; 9	8; 9	56	58	N/A	114
Russia	The Cossacks (Group); Maria Kochetkova (Ballet solo)	7; 9	7; 9	7; 9	7; 9	8; 9	7; 9	N/A	8; 9	63	N/A	51	114
China	Yang Yanan (Weaponry solo); Zhen Zhu Zheng & An Nan (Acrobatics duet)	8; 7	7; 7	7; 7	7; 8	7; 8	7; 7	8; 9	N/A	51	53	N/A	104

=== Standings after the quarter-finals ===
Overall standings
Place	Team	Ep. 1	Ep. 2	Total	Teams Remaining
1	Ireland	123	114	237	3 (solo, duet, group)
2	USA	114	122	236	3 (solo, duet, group)
3	Australia	114	121	235	3 (solo, duet, group)
4	South Africa	112	117	229	3 (solo, duet, group)
5 (tie)	Argentina	123	105	228	2 (solo, duet)
5 (tie)	Russia	114	114	228	2 (solo, duet)
7	India	113	112	225	3 (solo, solo, group)
8	China	117	104	221	1 (group)

Solo Standings
Place	Contestant(s)	Style of Dance	Score	Notes
1	(Australia) Reed Luplau	Contemporary	65	
2	(Russia) Maria Kochetkova	Ballet	63	
3	(India) Amarpali Ambegaokar	Kathak	62	
4 (tie)	(Argentina) Carolina Cerisola	Jazz	58	
4 (tie)	(India) Mythili Prakash	Bharata Natyam	58	
4 (tie)	(South Africa) Mamela Nyanza	Afro-Fusion	58	
4 (tie)	(Republic of Ireland) Damien O'Kane	Irish Step	58	
8 (tie)	(United States) Robert Muraine	Popping	57	^{1}
8 (tie)	(Australia) Sean Robinson	Tap	57	Eliminated ^{1}
8 (tie)	(Argentina) Miriam Larici	Tango	57	Eliminated ^{1}
11	(Republic of Ireland) Kelly Hendry	Irish Step	56	Eliminated
12 (tie)	(United States) Dormesha Sumbry-Edwards	Tap	55	Eliminated
12 (tie)	(South Africa) Sduduzo Ka-Mbili	Zulu Warrior Dance	55	Eliminated
14 (tie)	(China) Bei Zheng	Ribbon Dance	51	Eliminated
14 (tie)	(China) Yang Yanan	Shaolin Weapon	51	Eliminated
16	(Russia) Julia Bantner	Contemporary	50	Eliminated

^{1}Miriam Larici, Robert Muraine, and Sean Robinson were tied for 8th with 57 points going into the first elimination. Since only 8 could advance, a tie-breaking vote was called for from the five countries not involved. Muraine won four votes from South Africa, Ireland, Russia, and China, which put him through to the semifinal round. Robinson received one vote from India, while Larici received no votes.

Duet Standings
Place	Contestant(s)	Style of Dance	Score	Notes
1	(Argentina) Miriam Larci & Leonardo Barrionuevo	Tango	65	
2	(Russia) Pasha Kovalev & Anya Garnis	Ballroom	64	
3	(South Africa) Victor Da Silva & Claudia Savvides	Ballroom	59	
4	(Republic of Ireland) Damien O'Kane & Bernadette Flynn	Irish Step	58	
5	(United States) Georgia Ambarian & Eric Luna	Cabaret	57	
6	(Australia) Henry Byalikov & Giselle Peacock	Ballroom	56	
7	(China) Zhen Zhu Zheng & An Nan	Acrobatics	53	Eliminated
8	(India) Nishi Munshi & Sangita Sayal	Bollywood	51	Eliminated

Group Standings
Place	Contestant(s)	Style of Dance	Score	Notes
1	(United States) The Groovaloos	Street	67	
2	(China) Shaolin Monks	Kung-fu	66	
3	(Republic of Ireland) The Irish	Irish Step	65	
4 (tie)	(Australia) Australian Dance Theater	Contemporary	57	
4 (tie)	(South Africa) Umoja	Traditional Gumboot Dance	57	
6	(India) Bollywood Dancers	Bollywood	54	
7	(Russia) The Cossacks	Cossack Dance	51	Eliminated
8	(Argentina) Los Huincas Gauchos	Argentine Weapon	48	Eliminated

== Episode 3 ==
The third episode of Superstars of Dance aired on January 12, 2009.

Country	Dancers/Style	Judges' Scores								Totals			Grand Total
Country	Dancers/Style	(Argentina)	(India)	(Australia)	(South Africa)	(United States)	(Republic of Ireland)	(Russia)	(China)	Solo	Duet	Group	Grand Total
Argentina	Miriam Larici & Leonardo Barrionuevo (Tango Duet)	N/A	9	9	7	10	9	10	9	N/A	63	N/A	63
India	Amarpali Ambegaokar (Kathak Solo)	9	N/A	8	8	8	8	9	9	59	N/A	N/A	59
Australia	Australian Dance Theater (Group); Reed Luplau (Contemporary Solo)	9; 9	8; 8	N/A	9; 8	9; 8	8; 8	10; 9	9; 8	58	N/A	62	120
South Africa	Umoja (Gumboot Dance Group); Victor Da Silva & Claudia Savvides (Ballroom duet)	9; 8	8; 8	8; 8	N/A	8; 8	8; 9	9; 9	8; 9	N/A	59	58	117
USA	Robert Muraine (Popping Solo); The Groovaloos (Street dance group)	8; 10	9; 9	9; 10	9; 9	N/A	8; 9	9; 10	9; 9	61	N/A	66	127
Ireland	Damien O'Kane & Bernadette Flynn (Irish step dance duet)	8	9	7	7	8	N/A	9	8	N/A	56	N/A	56
Russia	Maria Kochetkova (Ballet solo)	9	9	9	9	9	9	N/A	9	63	N/A	N/A	63
China	No competitors participating								N/A	N/A	N/A	N/A	0

== Episode 4 ==
The fourth episode of Superstars of Dance aired on January 19, 2009. The other three groups, the other three duets, and the other four soloists:

Country	Dancers/Style	Judges' Scores								Totals			Grand Total
Country	Dancers/Style	(Argentina)	(India)	(Australia)	(South Africa)	(United States)	(Republic of Ireland)	(Russia)	(China)	Solo	Duet	Group	Grand Total
Argentina	Carolina Cerisola (Latin Solo)	N/A	7	6	4	8	10	10	8	53	N/A	N/A	53
India	Bollywood Dancers (Group); Mythili Prakash (Bharata Natyam Solo)	8; 8	N/A	7; 7	7; 7	8; 8	7; 8	8; 8	8; 8	54	N/A	53	107
Australia	Henry Byalikov & Giselle Peacock (Ballroom Duet)	8	9	N/A	8	8	8	9	9	N/A	59	N/A	59
South Africa	Mamela Nyamza (Afro-Fusion Solo)	7	8	8	N/A	8	8	8	8	55	N/A	N/A	55
USA	Georgia Ambaria & Eric Luna (Cabaret Duet)	8	7	7	5	N/A	8	8	7	N/A	50	N/A	50
Ireland	Bernadette Flynn (Irish Step Dance Solo); The Irish (Group)	8; 9	7; 9	7; 8	8; 8	7; 9	N/A	9; 10	8; 9	54	N/A	62	116
Russia	Pasha & Aliona Riazantsev (Magical Dance Duet)	7	8	6	3	8	10	N/A	9	N/A	51	N/A	51
China	Shaolin Monks (Group)	10	9	9	10	8	9	10	N/A	N/A	N/A	65	65

=== Standings after the semi-finals ===
Overall standings
Place	Team	Ep. 1	Ep. 2	Ep. 3	Ep. 4	Total	Teams remaining
1	Australia	114	121	120	59	414	2 (duet, group)
2	USA	114	122	127	50	413	2 (solo, group)
3	Ireland	123	114	56	116	409	0
4	South Africa	112	117	117	55	401	1 (duet)
5	India	113	112	59	107	391	1 (solo)
6	Argentina	123	105	63	53	344	1 (duet)
7	Russia	114	114	63	51	342	1 (solo)
8	China	117	104	0	65	286	1 (group)

Solo Standings
Place	Contestant(s)	Style of Dance	Score	Notes
1	(Russia) Maria Kochetkova	Ballet	63	
2	(United States) Robert Muraine	Popping	61	
3	(India) Amarpali Ambegaokar	Kathak	59	
4	(Australia) Reed Luplau	Contemporary	58	Eliminated
5	(South Africa) Mamela Nyamza	Afro-Fusion	55	Eliminated
6 (tie)	(India) Mythili Prakash	Bharata Natyam	54	Eliminated
6 (tie)	(Republic of Ireland) Bernadette Flynn	Irish Step	54	Eliminated
8	(Argentina) Carolina Cerisola	Latin	53	Eliminated

Duet Standings
Place	Contestant(s)	Style of Dance	Score	Notes
1	(Argentina) Miriam Larici & Leonardo Barrionuevo	Tango	63	
2 (tie)	(Australia) Henry Byalikov & Giselle Peacock	Ballroom	59	
2 (tie)	(South Africa) Victor Da Silva & Claudia Savvides	Ballroom	59	
4	(Republic of Ireland) Damien O'Kane & Bernadette Flynn	Irish Step	56	Eliminated
5	(Russia) Pasha & Aliona Riazantsev	Magical Dance	51	Eliminated
6	(United States) Georgia Ambarian & Eric Luna	Cabaret	50	Eliminated

Group Standings
Place	Contestant(s)	Style of Dance	Score	Notes
1	(United States) The Groovaloos	Street	66	
2	(China) Shaolin Monks	Kung-Fu	65	
3 (tie)	(Australia) Australian Dance Theatre	Contemporary	62	^{1}
3 (tie)	(Republic of Ireland) The Irish	Irish Step	62	Eliminated ^{1}
5	(South Africa) Umojo	Traditional Gumboot Dance	58	Eliminated
6	(India) Bollywood Dancers	Bollywood	53	Eliminated

^{1}The Australian Dance Theatre and The Irish team were tied in 3rd place with 62 points going into the first elimination. Since only 3 could advance, a tiebreaking vote was called for from the six countries not involved. The Australian Dance Theater won five votes from Argentina, India, South Africa, USA, and Russia. The Irish won one vote from China.

== Standings after the finale ==
Place	Team	Ep. 1	Ep. 2	Ep. 3^{*}	Ep. 4^{*}	Ep. 5	Total
1	USA	114	**122**	**127**	50	**117**	530
2	Australia	114	121	120	59	111	525
3	South Africa	112	117	117	55	59	460
4	India	113	112	59	107	56	447
5	Argentina	**123**	105	63	53	66	410
6	Ireland	**123**	114	56	**116**	0	409
7	Russia	114	114	63	51	65	407
8	China	117	104	0	65	57	343

^{*}The semi-finals were split over episodes 3 and 4, with an unbalanced number of contestants from each country participating in each episode.

- **Bold font** indicates the highest scoring team on a performance show.
- Italic font indicates the lowest scoring team on a performance show.

Solo Medals
Medal	Contestant(s)	Style of Dance	Score
Gold	(Russia) Maria Kochetkova	Ballet	65
Silver	(India) Amrapali Ambegaokar	Kathak	56
Bronze	(United States) Robert Muraine	Popping	51

Duet Medals
Medal	Contestant(s)	Style of Dance	Score
Gold	(Argentina) Miriam Larici & Leonardo Barrionuevo	Tango	66
Silver	(South Africa) Victor Da Silva & Claudia Savvides	Ballroom	59
Bronze	(Australia) Henry Byalikov & Giselle Peacock	Ballroom	58

Group Medals
Medal	Contestant(s)	Style of Dance	Score
Gold	(United States) The Groovaloos	Street	66
Silver	(China) Shaolin Monks	Kung-Fu	57
Bronze	(Australia) Australian Dance Theatre	Contemporary	53
