= Ronan Hardiman =

- Born: 19 May 1961 (age 64); Dublin, Ireland
- Genres: Soundtrack, theatre, Irish traditional music, Celtic music, folk music, rock music
- Occupation: Composer
- Website: ronanhardiman.com

Ronan Hardiman (born 19 May 1961) is an Irish composer, famous for his soundtracks to Michael Flatley's dance shows Lord of the Dance, Feet of Flames and Celtic Tiger Live.

== Early life ==
Hardiman was born in Dublin on 19 May 1961. His father was an Irish broadcasting executive. Hardiman listened to rock & roll and pop as a child. He has three sisters, including film director Neasa Hardiman and one brother, and they all play traditional musical instruments. He attended St. Kilian's German School and the Royal Academy of Music.

== Career ==
In 1978, at the age of 17, Hardiman began working as a clerk at the Bank of Ireland, a position he held for 12 years. He occasionally performed in local bands. In 1990, he quit his job and then began composing material based on Irish traditions for radio and television. He wrote the theme music to the documentary My Riviera.

His TV work included commissions for the title music for RTÉ Irish National Television Network News, and the original score for the natural history series Waterways,

He also wrote music for commercials for Guinness and the Irish National Lottery. In motion pictures, Hardiman earned acclaim for his score to the 1996 feature My Friend Joe, which garnered the Crystal Bear for Best Children's Film at the Berlin Film Festival.

Also in 1996, Hardiman was contacted by Michael Flatley, who needed a soundtrack to his new show, Lord of the Dance, quickly. The show was an international hit.

In 1997, Hardiman released his debut solo album, Solas, and a year later he resurfaced with Feet of Flames. His 2000 release, Anthem, blended the Celtic music sounds that he was famous for with more pop influences. The track "Ancient Lands" from Anthem was used by the 2002 Olympic men's figure skating champion, Alexei Yagudin, in his program "Overcome".

== Other work ==
In 2016, Hardiman wrote Sunlight, along with Wayne Hector and Nicky Byrne. This was Byrne's entry for the Eurovision Song Contest 2016.

== Discography ==
- 1993 - Celtic Classics 1
- 1996 - Celtic Classics 2
- 1996 - Ancient Lands - MCA
- 1996 - Lord of the Dance
- 1997 - Solas
- 1999 - Feet of Flames
- 2000 - Anthem
- 2006 - Celtic Tiger Live

== Personal life ==
Ronan's sisters include the notable neurologist Orla Hardiman and the filmmaker Neasa Hardiman. Hardiman lives in Dublin, with his wife, Helen. The couple have a daughter and a son.
