= Ciara Sexton =

English professional Irish dancer (born 1988)

- Born: May 16, 1988 (age 38); Holbrooks, Coventry, West Midlands, England
- Occupation: Irish dancer
- Employer(s): Limerick University; The Irish Dancing Magazine
- Known for: Professional Irish dancer, choreographer and teacher

Ciara Sexton (born 16 May 1988) is an English five time world champion professional Irish dancer who has toured with Michael Flatley’s Lord of the Dance, Celtic Woman and Riverdance. She has also choreographed on Broadway.

== Early life ==
Sexton was born in Holbrooks, Coventry, West Midlands, England, and is second-generation Irish. She attended Cardinal Newman Roman Catholic School in Coventry. Sexton began dancing aged 4, training in Irish dancing at the Marion Turley Academy and O’Shea School of Irish Dance. She won five World and All-Ireland Championships.

== Career ==
Sexton retired from dancing aged 25, but became a professional Irish dancer when she was cast as the lead dancer and played the mythological temptress Morrighan in Michael Flatley’s Lord of the Dance production. She has also performed in the stage shows including Celtic Women, again as Morrighan; Excalibur: A Celtic Rock Opera; Heartbeat of Home; Ireland The Show; and Riverdance. She appeared as a dancer in the Disney film Disenchanted (2022).

In 2016, Sexton became Senior Editor for The Irish Dancing Magazine. In 2020, she created a YouTube channel as "a free video resource and webinar series for Irish dancers around the world." She has also worked on television as a reporter for Irish Way. In 2025, she published a children's picture book titled My First Book of Irish Dance.

In 2019, Sexton became the lead choreographer for the Irish dance and musical theatre show Fáinne Óir by the Irish composer Kathy Fahey. The show was based on experiences of people during the Irish Great Hunger.

Sexton is employed as a lecturer on the BA Irish Dance programme at The Irish World Academy at The University of Limerick and teaches competitive Irish Dance for Scoil Uí Nualláin Irish Dance School in Limerick. She also contributed to "Master Irish Dance workshops" online in 2012 and has taught in New York City, United States.
