= Daire Nolan =

Irish dancer and choreographer (born 1968)

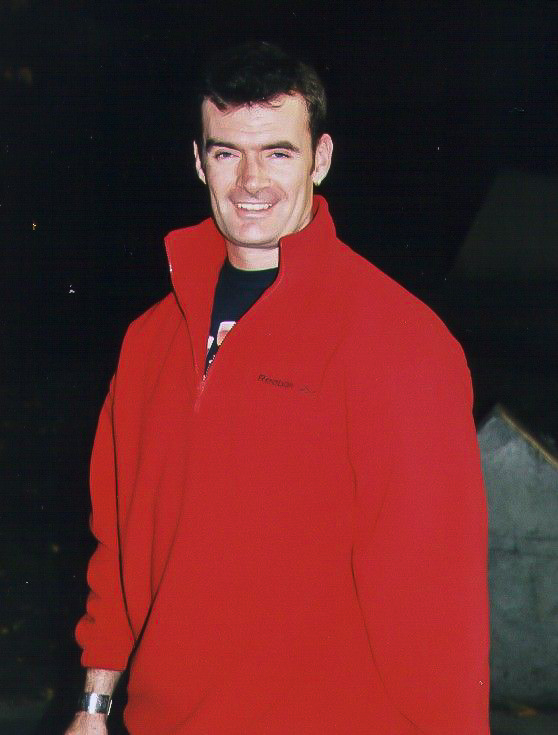
Daire_Nolan

Daire Nolan (born 1 December 1968) is an Irish dancer and choreographer best known for his work in Lord of the Dance and Feet of Flames.

Nolan began dancing the age of ten under the guidance of his parents Rose and Tony Nolan in Limerick and is no stranger to the international stage. He is undoubtedly the most famous "baddie" (evil stage character) within the Irish dance world since he was the original "Dark Lord" in Michael Flatley's show, Lord of the Dance. He later played the role in Flatley's show, Feet of Flames. He left the show in 2001.

Twice World champion and three times All-Ireland champion, Nolan has performed throughout Europe and in the United States of America, South Africa, Canada, Israel and Australia. He has also appeared on numerous television shows including The Tonight Show with Jay Leno and The Rosie O'Donnell Show in the US, and Des O'Connor Tonight in Britain. Nolan performed on Michael Flatley's tribute programme on RTÉ's The Late Late Show special during 2000. He has also performed with The Chieftains in the past and at the Oscars in Los Angeles in 1998.

After leaving Lord of the Dance Nolan joined the cast of To Dance on the Moon a production which has already played to in excess to 1 million people throughout Europe, Australia, New Zealand and Taiwan. Both Nolan and his brother Cian has played a major role in the development of this production, as well as Legend of the Knight and Dance of Desire.

A past under-20 Munster Rugby player and All Ireland long jump and triple jump champion, Nolan has since retired from stage dancing and now resides in Limerick with his wife Carol, his two daughters Fia and Alva and his son Shay. He currently works in Element Six in Shannon. Nolan and his brother Cian are dance choreographers for all Ceol Chiarrai productions.

In January 2009, he was chosen as the Irish judge for the American dance show, Superstars of Dance.
