= Bernadette Flynn =

Irish dancer

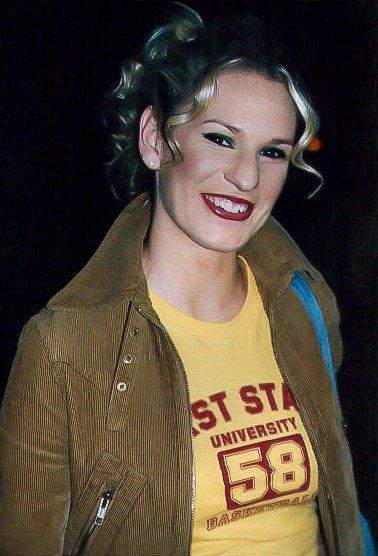
- Born: 1 August 1979 (age 46); Nenagh

Bernadette Mary Flynn (born 1 August 1979 in Nenagh, County Tipperary, Ireland) is an Irish dancer best known for her work in Lord of the Dance and Feet of Flames.

== Biography ==
Flynn was born on 1 August 1979 in Nenagh, County Tipperary, Ireland. Her parents Andy and Mary Flynn formerly owned "Andy Flynn's", a pub/bed & breakfast in her home town of Nenagh and subsequently became the proprietors of Flynn's Bistro located in Pearse Street in Nenagh. Bernadette has an older brother (Andrew), an older sister (Elaine) and twin sisters Catriona and Maria. Her family has always been very supportive of her dancing.

At the age of four she started at the Browne Academy of Dance, studying under Dorian Browne. Additionally, her sister Elaine tutored her in Irish dance in the early years, with classes during the week and dance competitions on the weekends. Her competitive achievements include six World titles, seven All-Ireland titles and nine Munster titles.

Bernadette attended St. Mary Secondary school in Ireland. She won the 1996 World Irish dancing championship shortly before going to rehearsals for the 1996 opening of Michael Flatley's Lord of the Dance in Dublin. She has no regrets about leaving her school behind, saying, "This is what I've always wanted to do, it's a dream come true for any Irish dancer".

== Lord of the Dance ==
When Flynn auditioned for Lord of the Dance, she was chosen to dance the lead role of Saoirse the Irish Colleen, while Gillian Norris was chosen to dance the lead role of Morrighann the Temptress. Flynn is the original Saoirse and appears on the film releases of the original Lord of the Dance and Feet of Flames. She would later reprise the role in Feet of Flames 2009 and the 2010 Return of Michael Flatley tour, which were also released on film.

Of her role, she has said:

"I had no idea I would get a lead role. Gillian and I just went along to the auditions just hoping to get in. We both went into Lord of the Dance as backline dancers. We'd only seen Michael Flatley in Riverdance and when we had to meet, it was like 'Michael Flatley, oh my god!'

After the auditions we went to the rehearsals and were just learning the dances and steps. At this stage, we hadn't been given a storyline. It was very, very difficult to get used to using our hands as well. One day we all had to dance using our hands, and Gillian and I began to stand out. After two weeks we stepped into our roles as good girl and bad girl and started to arrive early to rehearse and leave late. It was all unsaid for a while, but then we were told we were to take the lead roles in the Point in Dublin. We were told it could last a day, a week, a month or maybe even years!"

Michael Flatley has said of Flynn: "Dancing with Bernadette is like dancing with the air, you don't have to look and see where she is. You can feel her no matter where she is on the stage."

Her husband Damien O'Kane is also a member of the Lord of the Dance troupe and has been so since the beginning in 1996. He is one of the male leads and plays the Lord of the Dance. They were engaged in July 2003 and married on 28 December 2005. They have a daughter together named Mia Rose O'Kane.

== Career ==
Flynn prefers show dancing to competition, because she loves the freedom she has while performing. She has broken a bone in her foot, as well as having a couple of ligament sprains.

Highlights of her career include dancing at the Academy Awards in Los Angeles and for the President of Ireland during a visit to Nenagh. She can also be seen in two Olive Hurley Dance instructional videos: Irish dancing Step by Step and The 25th Anniversary World Championship.

In January 2009, both Bernadette and Damien represented Ireland on the NBC hit reality TV show 'Superstars of Dance'.
