= Maria Kochetkova =

Russian ballet dancer

Maria Kochetkova Мария Олеговна Кочеткова
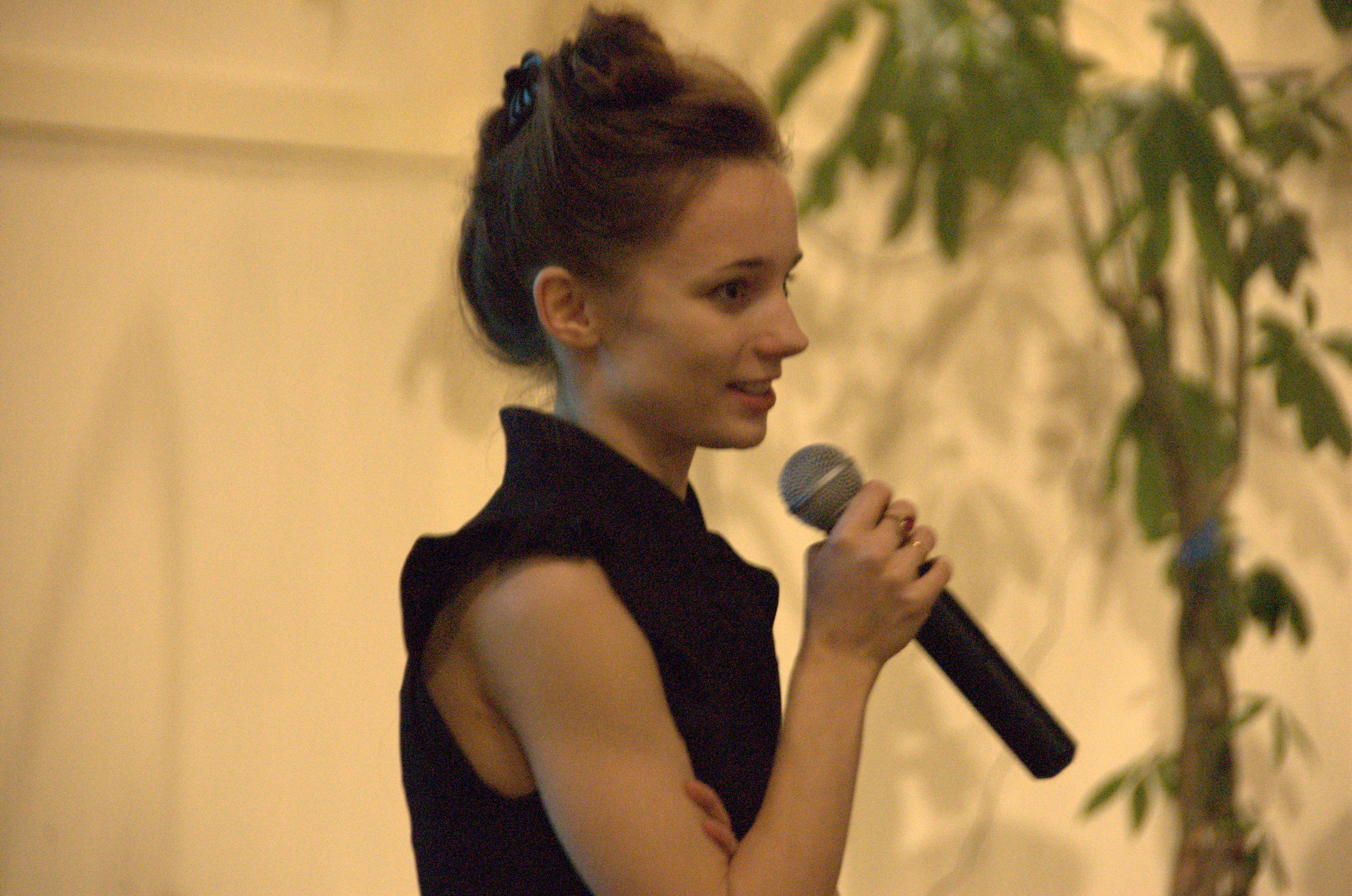
- Born: Maria Olegovna Kochetkova; 7 May 1984 (age 42); Moscow, Soviet Union
- Citizenship: Russian / American
- Occupation: Ballet dancer
- Height: 5 ft / 152 cm
- Career
- Current group: Freelance ballerina
- Former groups: The Royal Ballet; San Francisco Ballet; American Ballet Theatre; Finnish National Ballet; English National Ballet

Maria Olegovna Kochetkova (Russian: Мария Олеговна Кочеткова; born 1984) is a Russian ballet dancer. She was a principal dancer with the San Francisco Ballet between 2007 and 2018, and with the American Ballet Theatre between 2015 and 2017. After that, she became a freelance dancer for several years, before joining the Finnish National Ballet in the 2020/21 season. She danced with the English National Ballet from August 2021 until January 2021. She now works as a freelance ballerina and curator.

== Early life ==
Kochetkova was born in Moscow. She trained at The Bolshoi Ballet Academy from 1994 until her graduation in 2002.

== Career ==
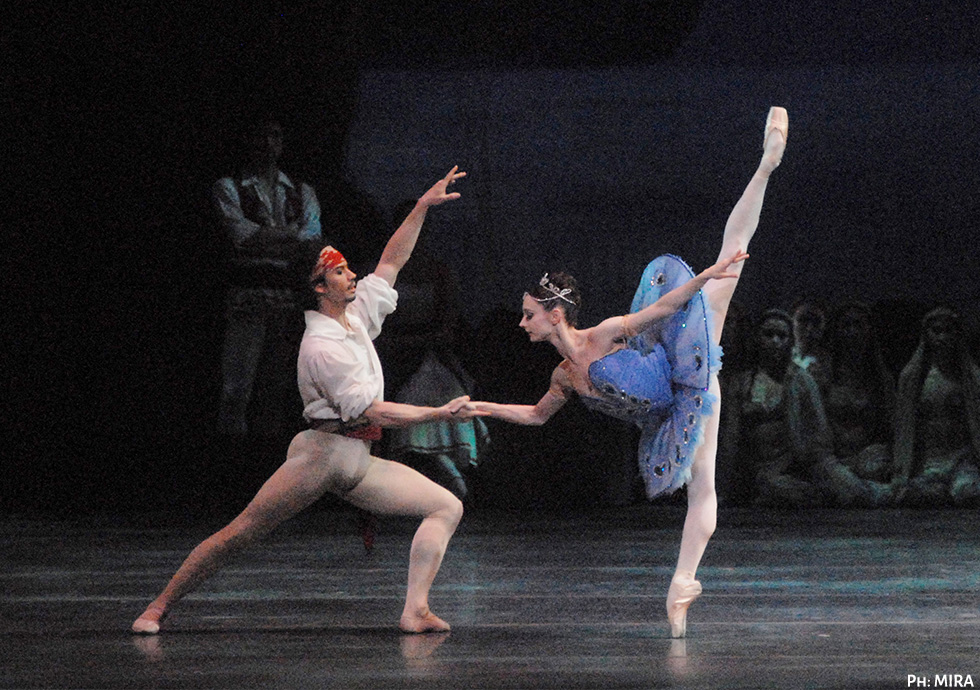
Maria Kochetkova and Herman Cornejo in Le Corsaire

After winning the Prix de Lausanne in 2002, Kochetkova danced with The Royal Ballet as an apprentice, then later danced at the English National Ballet for four years, during which she mostly danced corps roles but also the Sugar Plum Fairy in The Nutcracker.

In 2007, after Kochetkova took classes with the San Francisco Ballet, she joined the company as a principal dancer at the invitation of Helgi Tomasson. She danced roles such as Odette/Odile in Swan Lake, Swanilda in Coppélia , Tatiana in Onegin and lead role in Theme and Variations. She created roles such as David Dawson's Anima Animus and Christopher Wheeldon's Within the Golden Hour. She also danced the title role in the US premiere of Wheeldon's Cinderella.

Kochetkova performed the Grand Pas de Deux in San Francisco Ballet's Nutcracker which was broadcast by PBS in 2008 and won the solo gold medal in the NBC series Superstars of Dance. In 2013, she appeared in documentary Ballet's Greatest Hits, dancing the Don Quixote grand pas de deux, with Taras Domitro as Basilio and Skylar Brandt as the bridesmaid. She starred as Juliet in the 2015 filmed version of Romeo and Juliet. She also appeared in various music videos and advertisements. Kochetkova is also known for her social media presence, with hundred of thousands of followers around the world.

In 2015, Kochetkova joined the American Ballet Theatre but remained a principal dancer in San Francisco Ballet, and split her time between San Francisco and New York City. At ABT, she danced roles such as the title role in Giselle, Medora in Le Corsaire and Nikiya in La Bayadère. She remained a principal of ABT until 2017.

In 2018, Kochetkova left San Francisco Ballet after the company's Unbound Festival because she wanted more freedom and to be closer to her mother, who lives in Moscow.

Kochetkova now performs as a freelance dancer. She danced with the Norwegian National Ballet and Dresden Semperoper Ballett as a principal guest artist, and returned to English National Ballet as a guest artist. In 2019, Kochetkova presented her solo program, Maria Kochetkova: Catch Her If You Can at the Joyce Theater. It featured works by David Dawson and William Forsythe, as well as appearances of Sofiane Sylve, Carlo di Lanno and Drew Jacoby. In the 2020/21 season, Kochetkova joined the Finnish National Ballet as a lead principal dancer.

== Selected repertoire ==
Kochetkova's repertoire includes:

- The title role in Sylvia
- Medora in Le Corsaire
- Nikiya in La Bayadère
- Kitri in Don Quixote
- Aurora in The Sleeping Beauty
- Odette/Odile in Swan Lake
- The title role in Giselle
- Swanilda in Coppélia
- Tatiana in Onegin
- The title role in Cinderella
- Clara, grand Pas de Deux Ballerina, Queen of the Snow, and Sugar Plum Fairy in The Nutcracker
- The title role in Manon
- The Sylph in La Sylphide
- Symphonic Variations
- Voices of Spring
- Monotones
- Allegro Brillante
- "Emeralds," "Rubies" and "Diamonds" from Jewels
- Serenade
- 2nd movement in Symphony in C
- Theme and Variations
- Irina in Winter Dreams
- Pink in Dances at a Gathering
- Other Dances
- Chroma
- Drink to Me Only With Thine Eyes
- Raymonda Pas de Deux
- Piano Concerto #1 from Shostakovich Trilogy

=== Created roles ===
- The title role in Cinderella
- Raymonda Pas de Deux
- The Chairman Dances
- Borderlands
- Anima Animus
- Bjork Ballet
- Pas/Parts
- Classical Symphony
- Diving into the Lilacs
- Francesca da Rimini
- Swimmer
- Within the Golden Hour
- Number Nine
- From Foreign Lands
- Caprice
- On a Theme of Paganini
- Trio
- Hummingbird
- Symphonic Dances
- Guide to Strange Places
- Rush for Full
- A Dream Play

== Personal life ==
She is married to entrepreneur Edward King. She filed for divorce in October 2020. On February 7, 2023, Kochetkova revealed on Instagram that she was pregnant with her first child. She gave birth to her daughter in May 2023.

== Notable awards ==
- Prix de Lausanne, 2002 - silver medal
- Varna International Ballet Competition, 2002 - silver medal and jury prize
- Isadora Duncan Dance Award, 2008
- Superstars of Dance, 2009 - gold medal
- Prix Benois de la Danse, 2013 - nominated
- Critics’ Circle National Dance Award (U.K.) for Best Female Dancer, 2014 - nominated
- Premio Positano, 2017 - Ballerina of the Year

== See also ==
- List of dancers
- List of Russian ballet dancers
