= Feet of Flames =

Irish dance show

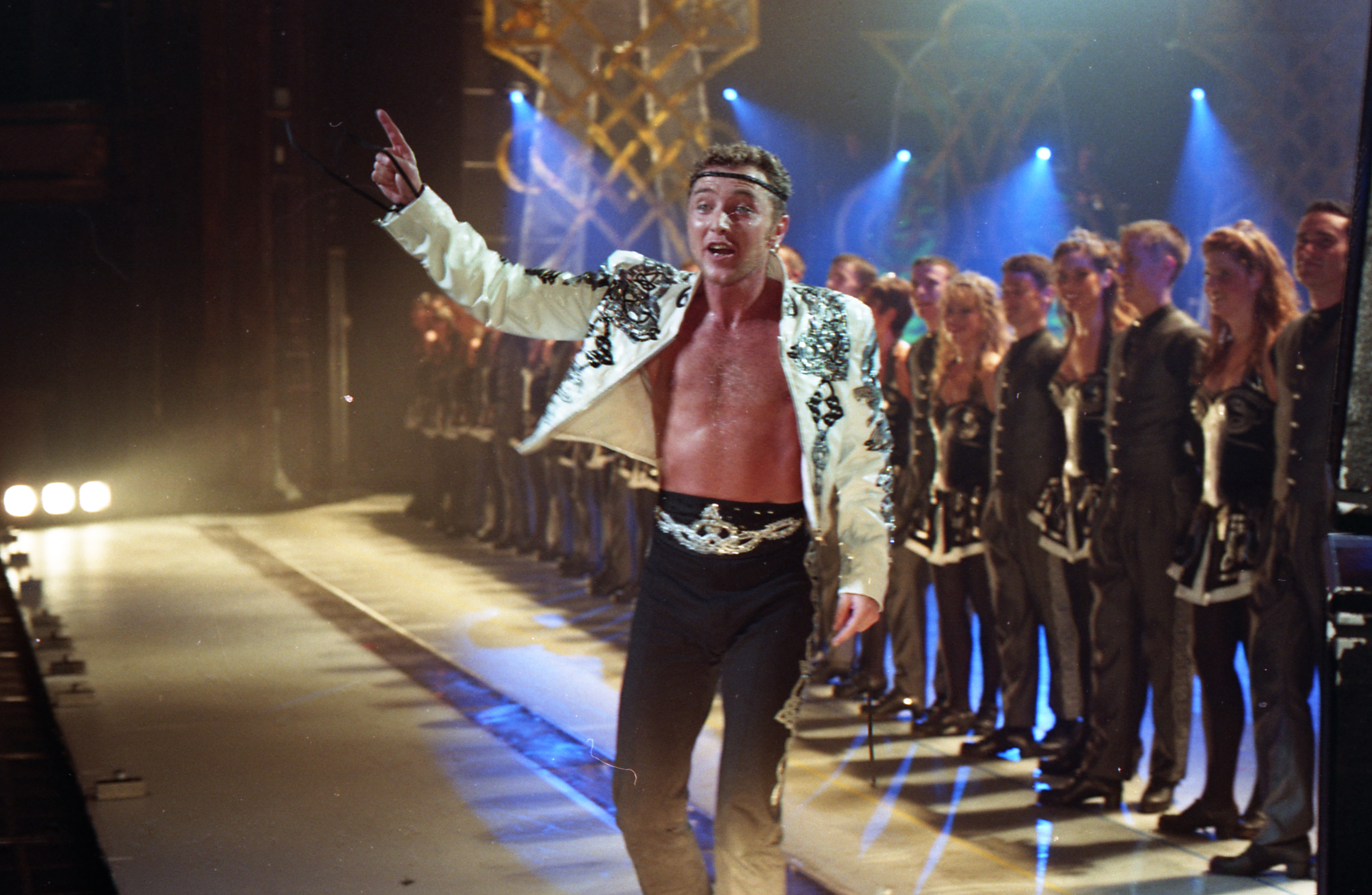
- Music by: Ronan Hardiman
- Genre: Irish Dance

Premiere
- Date: 1998
- Place: Hyde Park, London (1998), Nepstadion, Budapest (2000 World Tour)
- Directed by: Michael Flatley

Feet of Flames is an Irish dance show directed by Michael Flatley and scored by Ronan Hardiman. Flatley was known for the shows Riverdance and Lord of the Dance.

== History ==
=== Hyde Park 1998 ===
The Hyde Park show was first created as a one-off performance of Flatley's previous show, "Lord of the Dance". It premiered on 25 July 1998, playing to approximately 25,000 people at Rotten Row (known as "Route of Kings"), an open-space arena-like riding track area located on the south side of London's Hyde Park. Although closely resembling its predecessor, this show merged troupes, added new numbers, and featured a multi-level stage for the finale as well as an all-male choir and a live band. Amongst the new numbers is Flatley's solo – "Feet of Flames", which the show is based around. The show introduced some of the key elements that are now featured when Flatley performs. His silver-heeled shoes made by Freed of London were used for the first time in this show. TV screens on both sides of the stage were installed and are now used in all the shows that feature Flatley. Film of the Hyde Park show was later distributed on VHS and DVD.

=== 2000-2001 World Tour ===
On 21 September 1999 Michael Flatley announced a "Feet of Flames" world tour for 2000, with a launch held on the same day at Satzvey Castle. This tour began on Wednesday, 1 March 2000, in Germany.

This incarnation differed significantly from the original 1998 version: it had new numbers, new leads, a new story line and a "whole new outlook" in the words of Flatley. Both the original female leads Bernadette Flynn and Gillian Norris were replaced by Sarah Clark and Leigh Ann McKenna. Daire Nolan was replaced by Stephen Brunning. Both Daire Nolan and Gillian Norris went on to pursue their own careers after the 1998 show. Bernadette Flynn left to dance with Lord of the Dance troupe one until 2001 when she returned during the Victory Tour. Some of the characters changed slightly in the show. Lord of the Dance became Firespirit, Saroise became The Swan and Morrighan the Temptress became Cleopatra. The Dark Lord Don Dorcha, however, remained. Helen Egan's part as the little spirit became the Court Jester in the World Tour. The Highlight of the 2000 tour was Flatley and the Troupe performing in Budapest to over 100,000 people. It concluded on 29 July 2000 in Stormont Castle, Belfast, Northern Ireland.

The 2001 tour, dubbed the "USA Victory Tour", had a preview show on 6 June 2001 in the Bi-Lo Center, Greenville, South Carolina. The tour officially began on 8 June 2001 in the AmericanAirlines Arena, Miami, Florida. The highlight of the tour was Michael Flatley performing for the first time in Madison Square Garden in New York City on 29 June 2001. The tour ended on 29 July 2001 in Dallas, Texas in the American Airlines Center, the second event to be held at the venue. The last time the show was performed was 29 July 2001. Michael Flatley was said to have retired that night but later in 2005 would come out with a new show, Celtic Tiger.

=== 2008 and 2009 Tour ===
"Feet of Flames" returned to the world stage for a brief period with lead dancers Damien O' Kane and Bernadette Flynn taking the lead. This would mark the first time in the show's history that Michael Flatley did not star or dance in it. This show featured dances and costumes from 1998 Hyde Park show. Later in 2009 Flatley returned in the lead role.

=== 2009 ===
In 2009, Michael Flatley reprised his role in the 2009 tour held in the Taipei Arena in Taipei, Taiwan. It was filmed for DVD and later released as noted in his website. It was also released on Amazon.com and Amazon.co.uk by Playback HD in 2010. The 2009 return of Michael Flatley would later mark his return to his flagship show, Lord of the Dance, in 2010.

== CD, VHS and DVD releases ==
The "Feet of Flames" show from Hyde Park in 1998 was released on VHS and DVD. A CD of the new music from the Hyde park show was released with the DVD. The Budapest show in 2000 was recorded for DVD release but this did not happen; however, clips of the show were put on Michael Flatley's autobiography/concert DVD Michael Flatley Gold. Included on the DVD are the numbers:

- The Court of High Kings
- Firedance
- Cleopatra's Spell
- Thunder and Lightning
- Stolen Kiss
- The Duel
- Victory March/Victory Dance
- Feet of Flames solo

The Madison Square Garden show on 29 June 2001 in New York City and the American Airlines Center show on 29 July 2001 in Dallas, Texas, were recorded. The American leg of the tour was filmed for an IMAX planned for release in 2002. In addition parts of the footage were going to be used in a film featuring Michael Flatley. The working title for the film was supposedly "Dream Dancer", a fictional love story. Clips of the rehearsal process for the movie can be found on Michael Flatley Gold. The film was, however, never completed. The original film from the shows in allegedly tied up in ownership dispute between the filming company and Michael Flatley's company Unicorn Entertainment.

The 2009 Taiwan tour was filmed for an actual DVD release and later released on Amazon.com and Amazon.co.uk in 2010

The chanting of the monks from the "Court of High Kings" (Victory Tour) is sampled on the first track of Michael Flatley's flute album "On A Different Note", which was released in March 2011.

== Credits for the 1998 DVD ==
- Directors – Michael Flatley, David Mallet
- Producers – Michael Flatley, Martin Flitton, Dione Orrom, Helen Parker
- Composer – Ronan Hardiman
- Lighting Designer – Patrick Woodroffe

== Band members ==
- Michael Flatley - flute
- Cora Smyth and Máiréad Nesbitt - Fiddles
- Eammon Byrne - bass
- Paul Drennen - keyboards
- Jason Duffy - drums (1998 Hyde Park concert)
- Gary Sullivan - drums (2000 World tour and 2001 Victory tour)
- Dave Cooley - bass
- Simon Phillips - drums (on one concert during the 2000 World tour)
- Gerard Fahey - pipe whistle
- Dave Keary - guitars
- John Mckeon - choir leader

== 1998 ==
=== Leading roles ===
- The Lord of the Dance – Michael Flatley
- Don Dorcha, the Dark Lord – Daire Nolan
- Erin, the Goddess – Anne Buckley
- The Little Spirit – Helen Egan
- Morrighan, the Temptress – Gillian Norris
- Saoirse, the Irish Colleen – Bernadette Flynn

=== Understudies ===
- The Lord of the Dance - John Carey and Damien O'Kane
- Don Dorcha - Cian Nolan

=== Numbers ===
Act I

- 1. Cry of the Celts
- 2. Erin the Goddess – Marble Halls
- 3. Celtic Dream
- 4. Warriors
- 5. Gypsy
- 6. Dance Above The Rainbow (Instrumental)
- 7. Dueling Violins [Instrumental]
- 8. Breakout
- 9. Warlords
- 10. Erin the Goddess – Maighdean Mhara
- 11. The Lord of the Dance (Instrumental)

Act II

- 12. The High Priests
- 13. Whispering Wind
- 14. Dance of Love
- 15. Dangerous Games
- 16. Hell's Kitchen
- 17. Spirit's Lament
- 18. Fiery Nights
- 19. The Lament
- 20. Celtic Fire
- 21. Siamsa
- 22. Erin the Goddess – Carrickfergus
- 23. Stolen Kiss
- 24. Nightmare
- 25. The Duel [Instrumental]
- 26. Victory (instrumental)
- 27. Feet of Flames
- 28. Planet Ireland (Instrumental) and Encore

== 2000/2001 World Tour ==
=== Leading roles ===
- The Firespirit – Michael Flatley
- The Swan (2000/2001) – Sarah Clarke
- The Swan (2001) – Bernadette Flynn
- Cleopatra – Leigh Ann McKenna
- Alternating Cleopatra (understudies) – Kelly Hendry and Kristine Butke
- The Dark Lord – Stephen Brunning
- The Court Jester – Helen Egan
- The Irish Queen – Anne Buckley

=== Numbers ===
Act I

- 1. The Court of the High Kings
- 2. Firedance
- 3. The Irish Queen – an Maghdainn Mara (Instrumental)
- 4. Dance of the Swans
- 5. Warriors
- 6. Cleopatra's Spell
- 7. Fire Strings
- 8. Strip Jig (Instrumental)
- 9. Warlords
- 10. The Irish Queen – Marble Halls
- 11. Kaleidoscope
- 12. Celtic Fire

Act II

- 13. The High Kings
- 14. The Jester's Capture
- 15. Hell's Kitchen
- 16. Shalamar
- 17. The Swan's Dream
- 18. Thunder and Lightning
- 19. The Irish Queen – Carrickfergus
- 20. Stolen Kiss
- 21. Jester's Nightmare
- 22. The Duel
- 23. Victory March (Instrumental)
- 24. Victory Dance (Instrumental)
- 25. Feet of Flames (Instrumental)
- 26. Planet Ireland (Instrumental)

== Gallery ==
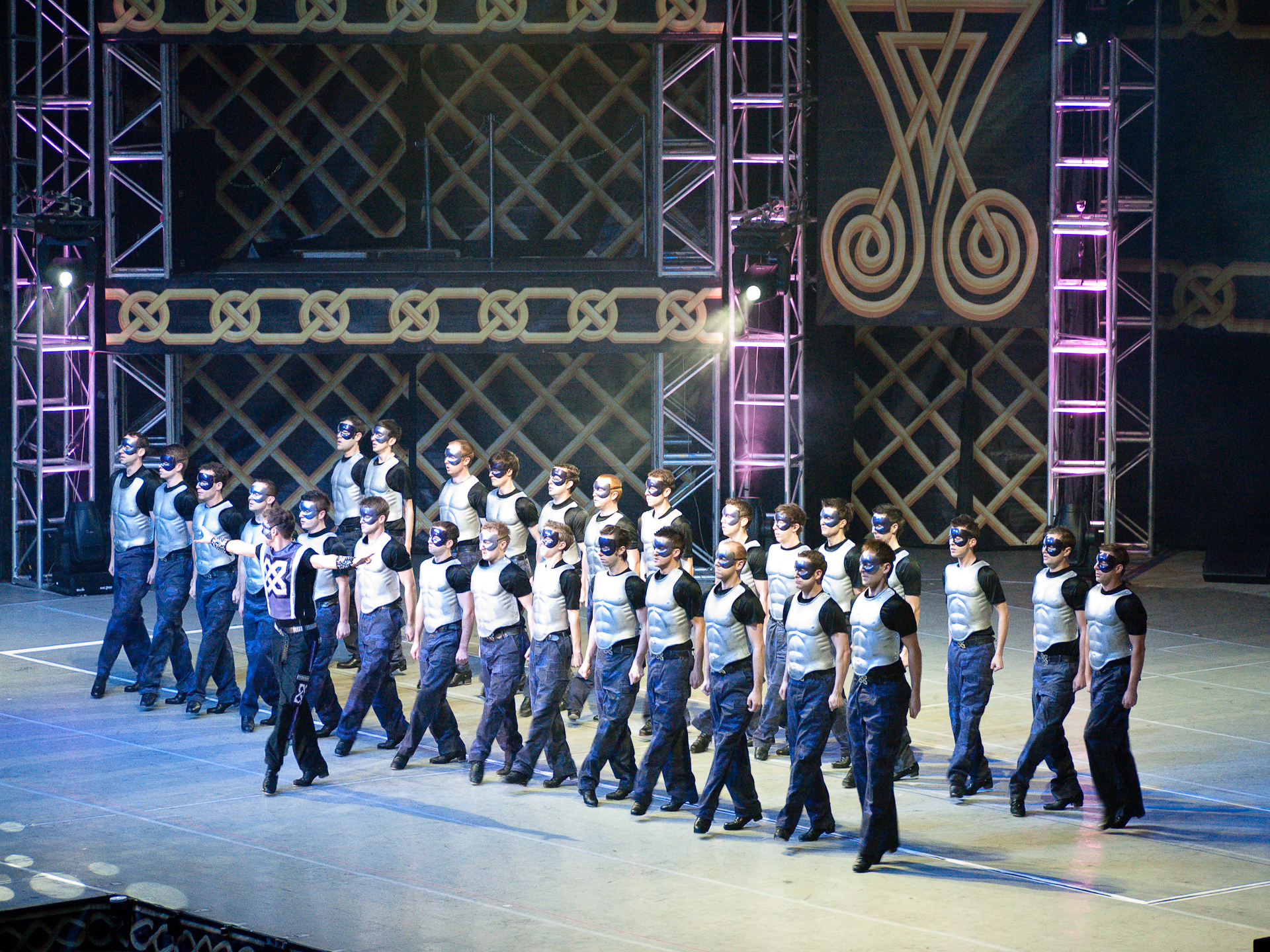
The Warriors

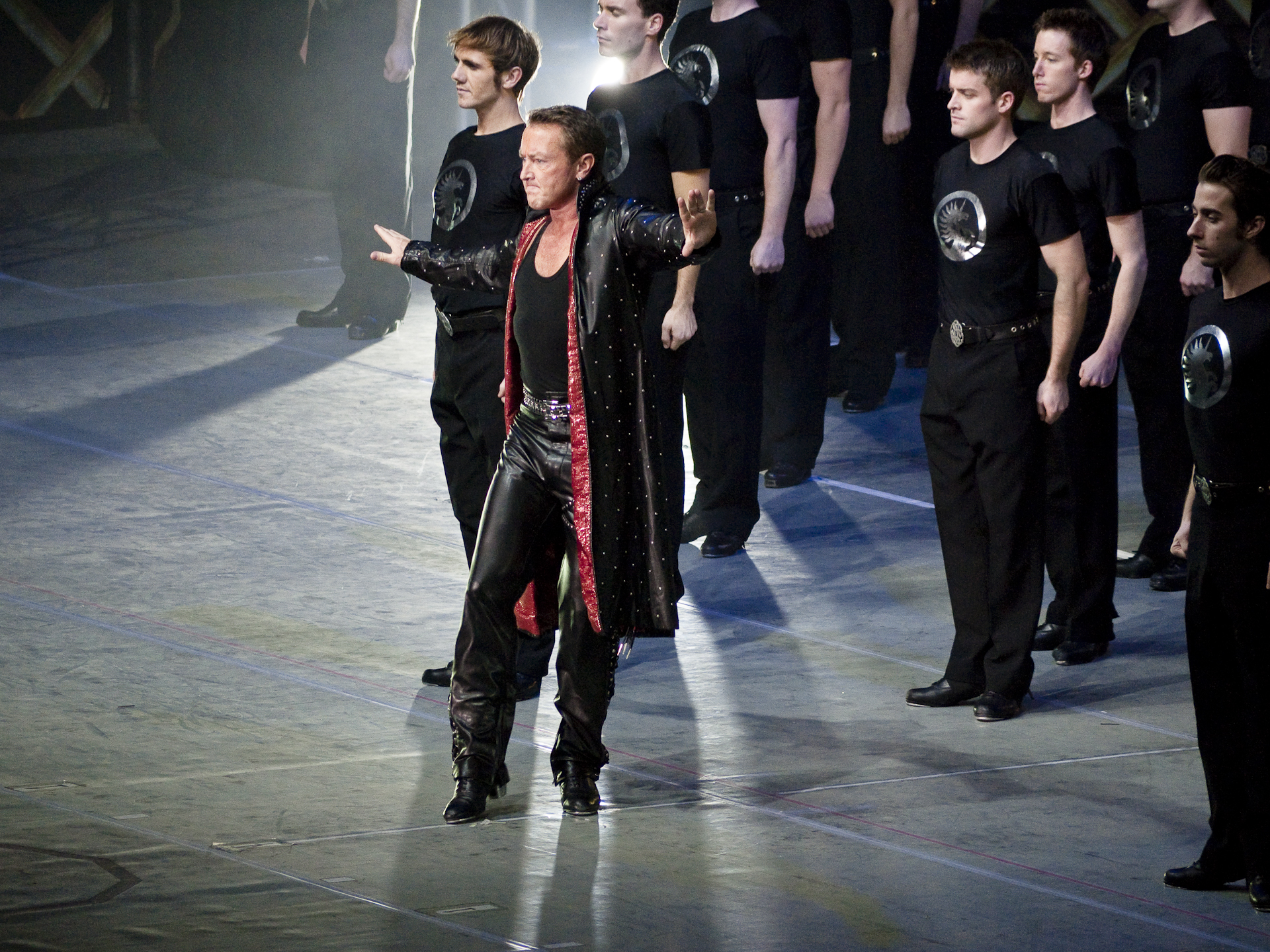
The Warlords
