= Maria Pogee =

Argentine-American dancer (born 1942)

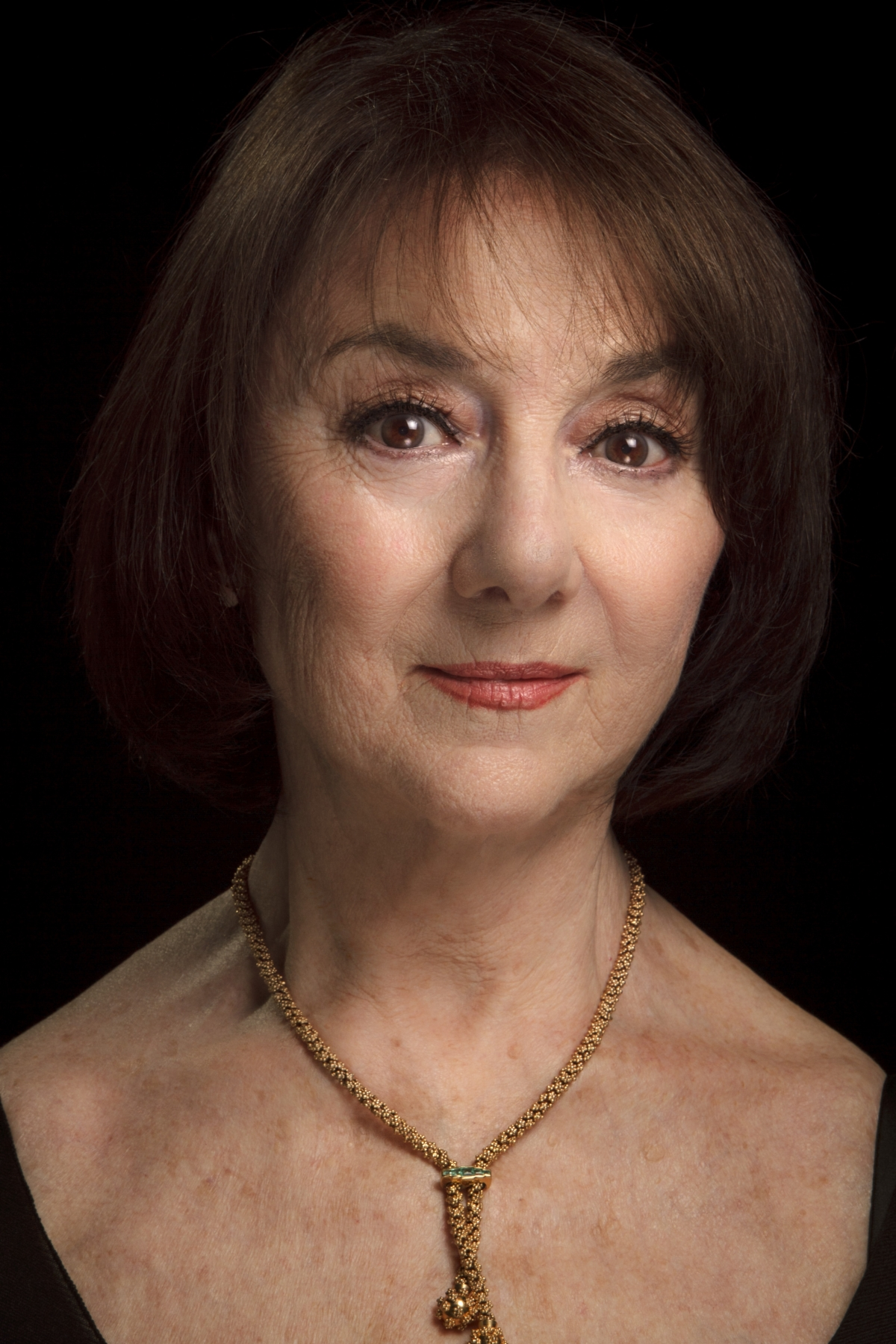
- Born: Elvira Maria Victoria Garcia; April 7, 1942 (age 84); Santa Fe, Argentina
- Occupations: dancer, actress, choreographer
- Years active: 1958–Present
- Spouse: Ruben Grinspanas (1966-1990) (until death)

Maria Pogee (born 7 April 1942), sometimes credited as Maria Pohji, is an Argentine-American dancer who performed on stage, television and film in the 1950s, 60s and 70s. She is also a choreographer, dance teacher and actress. She appeared in the movie Wacky Taxi (1972).

== Education ==
Pogee received her education in the performing art in Buenos Aires at the Teatro Colon.

== Career ==
In 1950, Pogee appeared on television variety shows with the "Lobato" dancers. The group toured in the United States and Pogee left in 1961 to pursue other employment opportunities. She performed with Juliet Prowse, Sammy Davis Jr., and Shirley MacLaine. From October 1965 to February 1966, Pogee was a "Hollywood a go go" dancer.

In 1960, Pogee worked at "Moulin Rouge", a night club, restaurant and showroom in Hollywood. The show was produced by Frank Sennes Sr, the Las Vegas showman. The dance group was scheduled to open at the El Rancho Vegas in Las Vegas but their starting was prevented by a fire at the hotel.

Pogee played "Tiger Lily" in the 1979 Broadway production of Peter Pan starring Sandy Duncan.

In 1983, Pogee choreographed Stars!, a theatrical production in South Africa which was produced by Anthony Farmer. in Sun City, Bophuthatswana, South Africa.

In 1998, Pogee choreographed The Mystery of Edwing Drood, a musical at University of Nevada, Las Vegas. Anthony Del Valle wrote in Las Vegas CityLife Review Journal, "Quietly, magically, she not only does what the script demands with maximum grace and minimum fuss but makes one want to see more."

In 2009, Pogee represented Argentina as an international judge on four episodes of the reality television show Superstars of Dance on the NBC Network. Pogee has taught at Backstage Dance Studio and jazz workshops at the Liberace Center for professional dancers in Las Vegas Valley.
