= Gillian Norris =

Irish dancer and model (born 1978)

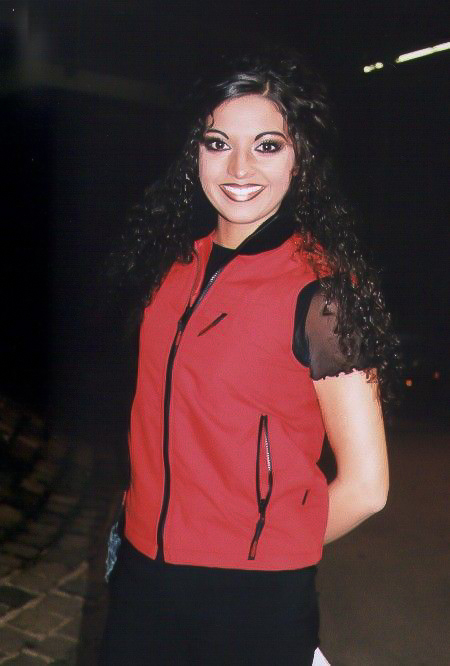
Gillian Norris

Gillian Norris (born 29 December 1978) is an Irish dancer and model best known for her work in Lord of the Dance and Feet of Flames.

Norris was born in Kilmacthomas, County Waterford, Ireland on 29 December 1978 to Mary Norris and Desmond Norris, a carpenter and well-known tenor. Norris is the youngest of five children. She started dancing at the age 10, when her parents signed her up for dance lessons at the Higgins School of Irish Dance in Waterford. She later won the All-Ireland, Great Britain, and British National titles and placed 3rd at the World Championships.

Norris made her professional debut as "Morrighan, The Temptress" in Michael Flatley's show Lord of the Dance. Norris toured with the show from its premiere in July 1996 at the Point Theater in Dublin until her departure in 2000. Her rendition of Morrighan is featured in the video releases of Lord of the Dance and the 1998 Feet of Flames (taped live in Hyde Park, London).

When the original show began in 1996, she danced opposite Michael Flatley for a year, and then in late 1997 joined the second touring company (Troupe 2) in the United States. In July 1998, she returned to Troupe 1 and danced the lead in Feet of Flames in Hyde Park. She remained with Troupe 1 and toured Europe until she left the show in 2000.

After she left the show, Norris returned to Ireland and briefly pursued a modeling and singing career. In summer 2001, she briefly danced in the show Ragús in Dublin. She then enrolled in beauty therapy school, where she was a top student. In June 2005, she opened her own beauty salon/spa in Kilmacthomas.

Norris says about performing, "To me, no matter if there's two people I'm performing to or 20,000 people, I'd perform the same way. I go out to make those happy; they deserve that, they're paying to see me dance and that's what I do; I go out and do my job."
