= Matthew Ahmet =

Shaolin Kung Fu practitioner

- Born: Matthew Metin Ahmet; 25 December 1988 (age 37); Camden, London, England
- Style: Shaolin kung fu
- Rank: Sifu

Other information
- Website: http://www.shaolinteam.co.uk/

Matthew Ahmet (born 25 December 1988) is a London-born practitioner of Shaolin Kung Fu who is best known as the coach for Shaolin Temple's "Wheel of Life" in Superstars of Dance. Ahmet is the only non-Chinese disciple of the Shaolin Temple to perform alongside the Shaolin Wheel of life show. In 2009, Ahmet set up the Shaolin Temple Cheshunt home to the Shaolin Warriors London who performed as Team Shaolin in the fourth series of Britain's Got Talent and were eliminated in the semi-final.

Ahmet is of Turkish descent. In late 2010, it was announced that he would have a reality show that was set to be broadcast in early 2011.

Ahmet's works as a motivational speaker and spiritual guide, focusing on personal development. He has spoken at various events, including the annual conference of the Guild of Letting and Management.
