= Celtic Tiger Live =

Irish dance show

- Original language: English
- Music by: Ronan Hardiman
- Genre: Irish dance

Premiere
- Date: 2005
- Place: England, United Kingdom
- Directed by: Michael Flatley

Celtic Tiger Live or more often known Michael Flatley's Celtic Tiger or just Celtic Tiger was an Irish dance show.

== History ==
Michael Flatley, known for Riverdance, Lord of the Dance and Feet of Flames, created Celtic Tiger which debuted in 2005. After being retired for four years, Flatley announced he was going to tour with a new show. In the summer of 2004, Flatley started the rehearsals of a new show in the SFX Theatre in Dublin, Ireland. In the autumn of 2004, the rehearsals moved on in the Shepperton Studios in London. Michael tried his best to keep the details including the name of the show a secret. Michael announced on his website in April 2005 that he was going to have a preview show of his new show Celtic Tiger in June 2005.

Celtic Tiger had its first performance at a private, invitation-only performance at the NIA Birmingham, England on 17 June 2005. The show was first performed for the public on 9 July 2005 in the Puskás Stadion (formerly the Népstadion) in Budapest, Hungary. Another preview show was planned for Prague in the Czech Republic, but at the last minute that show was cancelled as the theatre (which included a massive stage specially built for the show) was deemed unsafe for the dancers.

The next show, a preview show for the US tour, was held in Worcester, Massachusetts, on 24 September 2005, followed by a gala performance in New York City's Madison Square Garden on 27 September 2005, the show's official US premiere. The show then toured through Canada and sections of the US, with the final 2005 performance at the Patriot Center in Fairfax, Virginia on 26 November 2005.

Celtic Tiger started its European World Tour on 20 April 2006 at the Point Theatre in Dublin. That show was the first time Flatley had danced in the Point Theatre since he debuted Lord of the Dance. On 15 November 2006, the Autumn and Winter tours for the Celtic Tiger tour of Europe and Asia were cancelled when Flatley was hospitalised for a viral infection for two weeks. Flatley claimed in his website that he would release future touring dates in early 2007 but never did.

== Meaning ==
In the press release announcing the European preview of the show, Michael Flatley explained 'Celtic Tiger portrays the oppression of the Irish people through the ages and the tiger symbolises the awakening of their Spirit and their struggle for freedom. Celtic Tiger is my finest work to date. Budapest is one of my favourite cities in the world and I can think of no greater place to preview my new show."

== Credits ==
- Director – Michael Flatley
- Producer – Michael Flatley
- Choreographer – Michael Flatley
- Leading role – Michael Flatley

== Numbers ==
Act 1
1. The Heartbeat of the Tiger
2. Dancing in the Dark
3. St. Patrick
4. The Sleeping Tiger
5. The Vikings
6. Celtic Fire
7. The Garden of Eden
8. The Redcoats
9. The Famine
10. Four Green Fields
11. Bloody Sunday
12. A Call to Arms
13. The 1916 Rising
14. The Banshee
15. A Nation Once Again

Act 2
16. Freedom
17. A New World
18. The Last Rose
19. Celtic Kittens
20. Capone
21. Forever Free
22. Cowboy Cheerleaders
23. Yankee Doodle Dandy
24. Celtic Fire II
25. The Celtic Tiger
26. Encore – Yankee Doodle Dandy Reprise

=== Cast ===
- Michael Flatley
- Thomas Badger

== Dancers ==
- Lisa Anderson
- Thomas Badger
- Desmond Bailey
- Lynsey Brown
- Cherie Butler
- Ciaran Connolly
- Martin Connolly
- Siobhan Connolly
- Arlene Cooke
- Sarah Doherty
- Alison Epsom
- David Folan
- Odette Galea
- Jason Gorman
- Damon Griffiths
- Cassandra Halloran
- Louise Hayden
- Mark Hennessey
- Niall Holly
- Laura Jones
- Joanne Kavanagh
- Megan Luke
- Maeve Madden
- Debbie Maguire
- Rachel Martin
- Owen McAuley
- Kathleen McCarthy
- Brian McEnteggart
- Leigh Ann McKenna
- Kevin McVittie
- Niamh O’Brien (later married to Flatley)
- Damien O’Dochartaigh
- Roisin O’Donnell
- Andrew O'Reilly
- Ian Oswald
- Zoltan Papp
- Gary Pender
- Chris Piper
- Katie Pomfret
- Sarah Redmond
- Margaret Revis
- Sarah Spratt
- Keagan Van Dooren
- Bryana Verner
- Scott Walker
- Stephen Walker

== Band ==
- Jason Duffy — Drums and Percussion (DVD)
- Gary Sullivan -Drums and Percussion (Canada & US tour)
- Declan O'Donoghue — Drums and Percussion (tour)

- Niamh Gallagher — Fiddles
- Maire Egan — fiddles (DVD)

- Aongus Ralston — Bass Guitarist (tour)
- Gavin Ralston — Guitar (DVD & tour)

- Cora Smyth — Fiddles (DVD & tour)
- Brenda Curtin — fiddles (DVD)

- Niamh Gallagher — fiddles (DVD)
- John Colohan — Guitar (DVD)

== Vocalists ==
- Una Gibney (DVD & tour)
- Paul Harrington (DVD and tour)

== Tour dates ==
List of performances, showing date, city, country, venue
Date	City	Country	Venue	Notes
17 June 2005	Birmingham	England	NIA	DVD filming ("St. Patrick" onwards) – directed by David Mallet
9 July 2005	Budapest	Hungary	Nepstadion/Puskás Ferenc Stadion	second DVD recording (used for the opening scenes), concert and rehearsal scenes on DVD.
North America Late 2005				
24 September 2005	Worcester, Massachusetts	United States	DCU Center	
27 September 2005	New York City	United States	Madison Square Garden	
29 September 2005	Montreal	Canada	Bell Center	
3 October 2005	Halifax	Canada	Halifax Metro Center	
5 October 2005	Ottawa	Canada	Corel Center	
6 October 2005	London	Canada	Budweiser Gardens	
7 October 2005	Hamilton	Canada	Copps Coliseum	
11 October 2005	Winnipeg	Canada	MTS Center	
12 October 2005	Saskatoon	Canada	Credit Union Center	
14 October 2005	Calgary	Canada	Pengrowth Saddledome	
15 October 2005	Edmonton	Canada	Rexall Place	
17 October 2005	Vancouver	Canada	GM Place	
18 October 2005	Victoria	Canada	Save on Foods Memorial Centre	
20 October 2005	Everett, WA	United States	Everett Events Center	
22 October 2005	Sacramento, CA	United States	Arco Arena	
25 October 2005	San José, CA	United States	HP Pavilion	
27 October 2005	San Diego, CA	United States	iPayOne Center	
29 October 2005	Anaheim, CA	United States	Arrowhead Pond	
30 October 2005	Glendale, AZ	United States	Glendale Arena	
3 November 2005	St. Louis, MO	United States	Savvis Center	
4 November 2005	Ames, IA	United States	Hilton Coliseum	
5 November 2005	Omaha, NE	United States	Qwest Center	
8 November 2005	Minneapolis, MN	United States	Target Center	
10 November 2005	Cleveland, OH	United States	Gund Arena	
11 November 2005	Pittsburgh, PA	United States	Mellon Arena	
12 November 2005	Columbus, OH	United States	Nationwide Arena	
17 November 2005	Milwaukee, WI	United States	Bradley Center	
18 November 2005	Chicago, IL	United States	Allstate Arena	
22 November 2005	Uncasville, CT	United States	Mohegan Sun Arena	
25 November 2005	Philadelphia, PA	United States	Wachovia Center	
26 November 2005	Fairfax, VA	United States	Patriot Center	
Europe and Asia 2006				
20 April 2006	Dublin	Ireland	The Point Theatre	
22 April 2006	Newcastle	England	Metro Radio Arena	
23 April 2006	Sheffield	England	Hallam FM Arena	
26 April 2006	London	England	Wembley Arena	
27 April 2006	Birmingham	England	The NIA	
28 April 2006	Manchester	England	MEN Arena	
29 April 2006	Glasgow	Scotland	SEC Centre	
1 May 2006	Antwerp	Belgium	Sportpaleis Antwerpen	
2 May 2006	Rotterdam	Netherlands	Rotterdam Ahoy Sportpaleis	
6 May 2006	Oberhausen	Germany	König-Pilsener-Arena	
8 May 2006	Stuttgart	Germany	Schleyerhalle	
10 May 2006	Hamburg	Germany	Color Line Arena	
11 May 2006	Zürich	Switzerland	Hallenstadion	
12 May 2006	Vienna	Austria	Stadthalle Wien	
15 May 2006	Stuttgart	Germany	Schleyerhalle	
16 May 2006	Frankfurt	Germany	Festhalle	
17 May 2006	Oberhausen	Germany	König-Pilsener Arena	
19 May 2006	Copenhagen	Denmark	Forum Copenhagen	
20 May 2006	Karlstad	Sweden	Löfbergs Lila Arena	
21 May 2006	Oslo	Norway	Oslo Spektrum	
23 May 2006	Stockholm	Sweden	Stockholm Globen	
25 May 2006	Helsinki	Finland	Hartwall Arenna	
3 June 2006	Dublin	Ireland	RDS Arena	
10 June 2006	Taipei	Taiwan	Chung Shan Soccer Stadium	
11 June 2006	Taipei	Taiwan	Chung Shan Soccer Stadium	
13 June 2006	Kaohsiung	Taiwan	Chung-Chun Stadium	
17 June 2006	Hong Kong	China	HKCEC Hall 3	

== Cancelled shows ==
List of cancelled concerts, showing date, city, country and venue
Date	City	Country	Venue	Reason for cancellation
12 August 2005	Prague	Czech Republic	Strahov Stadium	The venue stage set built for the Prague stop was deemed unsafe for use.
14 November 2006	Brussels	Belgium	Vorst National	Flatley's hospitalization and recovery
15 November 2006	Brussels	Belgium	Vorst National	Flatley's hospitalization and recovery
17 November 2006	Zurich	Switzerland	Hallenstadion	Flatley's hospitalization and recovery
18 November 2006	Hannover	Germany	TUI Arena	Flatley's hospitalization and recovery
19 November 2006	Mannheim	Germany	SAP Arena	Flatley's hospitalization and recovery
21 November 2006	Munich	Germany	Olympiahalle	Flatley's hospitalization and recovery
23 November 2006	Leipzig	Germany	Arena Leipzig	Flatley's hospitalization and recovery
25 November 2006	Berlin	Germany	Velodrom Berlin	Flatley's hospitalization and recovery
26 November 2006	Stuttgart	Germany	Schleyerhalle	Flatley's hospitalization and recovery
27 November 2006	Cologne	Germany	Kölnarena	Flatley's hospitalization and recovery
28 November 2006	Hamburg	Germany	Color Line Arena	Flatley's hospitalization and recovery
5 December 2006	Manchester	England	MEN Arena	Flatley's hospitalization and recovery
6 December 2006	London	England	Wembley Arena	Flatley's hospitalization and recovery
8 December 2006	Paris	France	Stade de France	Flatley's hospitalization and recovery
9 December 2006	Verona	Italy	Verona Arena	Flatley's hospitalization and recovery
