= Orla Hardiman =

Irish consultant neurologist

Orla Máire Hardiman (BSc MB BCh BAO MD FRCPI FAAN FTCD (Fellow of Trinity College Dublin) MRIA (Elected member of the Royal Irish Academy) is an Irish consultant neurologist. She was appointed Professor of Neurology by Trinity College University of Dublin in 2014, where she heads the Academic Unit of Neurology, housed in Trinity Biomedical Sciences Institute. She leads a team of over 40 researchers focusing on clinical and translational aspects of amyotrophic lateral sclerosis and related neurodegenerations. She was the Health Service Executive National Clinical Lead for Neurology between 2019 and 2024. Hardiman has become a prominent advocate for neurological patients in Ireland, and for patients within the Irish health system generally. She was a co-founder of the Neurological Alliance of Ireland, an umbrella organisation for over 24 advocacy groups in Ireland.

== Education and training ==
=== Undergraduate degree and early postgraduate training ===
Hardiman attended University College Dublin (UCD) as an undergraduate medical student. She completed an intercalated BSc in physiology in 1980 and received her medical degree in 1983. After graduation from UCD, Hardiman undertook a one-year internship at St. Vincent's University Hospital, Dublin. From 1984 to 1986, she trained as a senior house officer in neurology and neuropathology at St. Lawrence's Hospital, Dublin.

=== United States ===
In 1986, Hardiman began a three-year neurology residency under the Harvard Longwood Area Neurology Training Program at Brigham and Women's Hospital, Beth Israel Hospital and Children's Hospital Boston. In 1989, she undertook a two-year clinical and research fellowship in neuromuscular diseases under Dr. Robert H. Brown Jr. at the Department of Neurology, Massachusetts General Hospital and Harvard Medical School.

=== Return to Ireland ===
Upon completion of her fellowship, Hardiman took up a position as a Newman Scholar at the Department of Physiology in UCD. In 1992, Hardiman obtained her medical doctorate (MD) from UCD. She became a member of the Royal College of Physicians of Ireland in 1993 and became a fellow of the college in 2001. In 1993 she became director of the ALS and neuromuscular clinics at Beaumont Hospital. In 1994 she was appointed as a tenured lecturer at the UCD Department of Physiology. She was appointed to Beaumont Hospital as the 11th Consultant Neurologist in Ireland in 1996. and appointed as Professor of Neurology in Trinity College Dublin in 2014.

== Research ==
Hardiman was a Health Research Board clinician scientist between 2007 and 2017. Her main research interests are amyotrophic lateral sclerosis (motor neurone disease) and related motor neuron degenerations, phenotype/genotype correlations, population genetics biomarker development and clinical epidemiology. Her group was one of the first to describe the population based prevalence of cognitive and behavioural change in ALS and to describe the biological association between ALS and developmental neuropsychiatric disorders including schizophrenia and related conditions.

She is a co-founder of the Latin American Epidemiologic Consortium in ALS (LAENALS), which was funded by the US CDC. She is co-chair of the ENCALS and TRICALS Consortium. She is the Lead investigator of the international academic/industry collaboration PRECISION ALS (www.precisionals.ie). Her work is funded by Science Foundation Ireland and the Health Research Board. Along with RCSI research fellow Dr. Matt Greenway, Hardiman discovered angiogenin, a novel gene which may be responsible for motor neuron disease. The discovery led to the development of an international research programme with Harvard Medical School, institutes in the United Kingdom and researchers at RCSI. Since 2008 she has been the editor in chief of the field journal "Amyotrophic Lateral Sclerosis and Frontotemporal Degeneration" and with Colin P Doherty is Co-Editor of the textbook "Neurodegenerative Disorders".

== Awards and honours ==
In 2004, Hardiman received the first Palatucci Advocacy Leader of the Year Award from the American Academy of Neurology. The selection committee commended her "tireless advocacy efforts on behalf of the neurology profession and patients" in Ireland. In 2009, she was awarded the Sheila Essey Award for ALS research by the American Academy of Neurology and the American ALS Association as well as the International ALS/MND Alliance Forbes Norris Award. In Ireland, she was honoured as the Science Foundation Ireland Researcher of the Year in 2022. In the same year, she received the Trinity College Dublin Impact Award, and in 2023, the Health Research Board Research Impact Award. She is also the 2021 recipient of the Tom Connor Distinguished Neuroscientist Award. She was presented with a Lifetime Achievement Award for her work on ALS/MND by Taoiseach Micheál Martin on the occasion of the 40th anniversary of the foundation of the Irish Motor Neuron Disease Association on June 18 2025.

She is a fellow of Trinity College Dublin, and a member of the Royal Irish Academy.
