= Lord of the Dance (musical) =

Irish musical and dance production

- Music: Ronan Hardiman
- Premiere: 26 July 1996: Point Theatre, Dublin
- Productions: Las Vegas

Lord of the Dance is an Irish dance show and dance production that was created, choreographed, and produced by Irish-American dancer Michael Flatley, who also took a starring role. The music for the show was written by Ronan Hardiman.

== Background ==
Michael Flatley found his first fame starring in Riverdance, but he left the show in late 1995 due to conflicts over creative control. He dreamed of, and put into action, a plan of putting together a dance show capable of playing in arenas and stadiums instead of traditional theatres. Later on, Flatley soon began thinking of rhythm patterns and steps for an a cappella number. This number would later become "Planet Ireland", the show's finale. The show took six months to bring from conception to stage. Auditions were held in the SFX City Theatre in Dublin.

== Story ==
The show takes place in a “Celtic” land called Planet Ireland (or it is sometimes interpreted as ancient/historical Ireland), with much Celtic-themed imagery and music. The story follows Flatley’s character, the “Lord of the Dance”, and his fight against the evil dark lord Don Dorcha from taking over Planet Ireland. The Lord of the Dance defeats the dark lord's invasion with help from a little spirit, a pixie or faerie of sorts. This spirit, who initially appears as some kind of court jester, is eternally positive, dancing and beaming at all times. The show begins with the little spirit playing “The Lord of the Dance” melody, solo, on tin whistle, before the dark forces come and take over the Celts. There is also a secondary theme of “good girl versus bad girl”, or "love versus lust", expressed through dance several times throughout the show. Saoirse, the Irish cailín (normally appearing in white or brighter colours), fights to win the love of the Lord of the Dance against the wicked Morrighan, the Temptress (usually appearing in all red or black dress). The stories are based on ancient Irish folklore and some biblical references; the title itself, along with the main musical theme, is taken from a contemporary hymn. Through tales of love, heartache, temptation, peace, battle, struggle and finally victory, the story of the Lord of the Dance’s triumph is told through dance and live music.

== Synopsis (original 1996 version) ==
The show begins with the number "Cry of the Celts". A female troupe sleeps in a semicircle with a girl dressed in gold, known as "Little Spirit" while winds accompany the scene. Seconds later, masked figures cloaked in black and bearing torches arrive and stand as statues while ambient new age music plays. Later, the Little Spirit rises from her sleep and plays the show's theme song on a tin whistle. She then awakens the troupe with magical dust. The Little Spirit leaves with the cloaked figures as the female troupe makes their first dance. Drum beats fill in and the show's main eponymous character, known as "Lord of the Dance" appears and dances before an elated crowd before being accompanied by the entire dance troupe.

After a song by "Erin the Goddess" ("Suil A Ruin"), the Little Spirit activates a mechanical musical doll which then dances with the female troupe led by the lead female protagonist Saoirse ("Celtic Dream"). A terrifying performance of "Warriors" with suspenseful music follows, with dark lord Don Dorcha doing an introductory dance before being followed by his troupe. At the end of Warriors, the Little Spirit plays a trick on one of them. Morrighan the Temptress makes her introduction soon after ("Gypsy").

"Strings of Fire" kicks in with two female fiddlers. Later Saoirse leads the female troupe in fighting Morrighan and later changes to black inner clothing after a fight with the temptress ("Breakout"). They are then greeted by the Lord of the Dance himself and his troupe, who then dances into an a'capella number ("Warlords"). Another song by Erin the Goddess follows ("Gaelic Song")

The eponymous number of the show ("Lord of the Dance") begins with a two pairs of males accompanying a pair of females in an introductory dance before the eponymous character dances to the shows' upbeat theme. The number ends with the title character being joined by his troupe.

== Performances ==
Lord of the Dance had preview shows at the Point Theatre in Dublin from 28 June to 1 July 1996. The show staged a premiere performance on 27 June 1996 – the video was filmed on 2 July 1996.

In March 1997, Lord of the Dance was performed at the 69th Academy Awards. That November, Lord of the Dance expanded operations by forming several troupes of dancers which would tour North America and Europe. Flatley signed a contract with Disney for Lord of the Dance to perform at Epcot in Walt Disney World in the summer of 1999 and Lord of the Dance was asked back the following summer in 2000. Troupe 4 performed at the Disneyland Paris Resort in 2002 and 2003. There are currently two troupes of Lord of the Dance productions touring the world: Troupe 1, currently touring throughout Europe and Asia and Troupe 2, touring US and Canada including Europe too.

== Feet of Flames ==
After two years of touring, Flatley created Feet of Flames, an expanded version of the show. The first Feet of Flames concert which premiered on July 25 that year, was made as a one-off performance of Lord of the Dance, held before 25,000 people in London's Hyde Park. Feet of Flames merged two troupes of the original show, totaling almost 100, and added an all-male choir and a live band. The show's stage, measuring 180 feet (55 m) wide, borrowed set designs from the original Lord of the Dance but adds multiple levels for the finale. A special feature was a dance solo by Flatley without music. The Hyde Park show marked the last time Flatley starred in Lord of the Dance and was supposed to be the last time he danced live on stage, but a different version of Feet of Flames would later go on a world tour in 2000–01 (only one troupe appeared on this tour); he would go on to do Celtic Tiger. The Lord of the Dance 10th Anniversary Party was held in June 2006.

== 2010 Return of Michael Flatley Reunion tour ==
Flatley's return to performance in Feet of Flames Taipei in 2009 marked the first step to his return in the show.

In April 2010, he announced that he would be returning to headline the Lord of the Dance show, with performances in Dublin's The O_{2}, Belfast's Odyssey Arena, London's O_{2} arena, Sheffield's Sheffield Arena, Manchester's MEN Arena, Birmingham's LG Arena, Nottingham's Trent FM Arena, Liverpool's Echo Arena, London's Wembley Arena, Newcastle's Metro Radio Arena in November 2010, with dates also announced in Germany, Switzerland & Austria, the first time he will have done so since 1998.

This iteration of the show remained the same as the 1996 version but did not use the original castle courtyard stage set design, rather, upgrading it to a modern design consisting of seven erect rectangular screens with a set of stairs also acting as screens. New lighting was introduced and aircraft landing lights were used as stage lights to add to the effect. The reunion tour also featured updated and redesigned costumes from the original show as well as elements from Feet of Flames 1998 such as a live band, chanting monks, and the notable Feet of Flames solo. Some costumes were redesigned; one was that of Don Dorcha, who remained a mortal rival Celtic clan leader and warlord like the original iteration, with his iconic spiked medieval-style helmet and darker costume utilized to make him and the army (also bearing skull-like helmets) look menacing.

The concerts in Dublin, London, and Berlin were filmed for a 3D concert film entitled Lord of the Dance 3D, later released on DVD and Blu-ray on 28 June 2011 under the title Michael Flatley Returns as Lord of the Dance in US and Canada, and 4 August in Australia, 12 September 2011 in the UK and October in Germany, France, Benelux and Scandinavia. The 3D version of the film was released only in Blu-ray in late 2011.

== Dangerous Games ==
In 2014, Flatley created Dangerous Games, a revised spinoff of Lord of the Dance. While maintaining 50% of the numbers from the original show, new numbers were introduced, featuring dancing robots, new songs, new music by Gerard Fahy, and re-scores of Ronan Hardiman's pieces.

The character of Don Dorcha was remade from a simple warrior and rival clan leader to an undead, demonic, humanoid/cyborg hybrid with new supernatural powers. In addition, the show used a more modern screen background.

== 3oth Anniversary ==
For the premiere of the 30th anniversary of Lord of the Dance in 2026 at the 3Arena, Flatley led the troupe in a one-off performance during the finale.

== Lead dancers ==
Over the years, along with several troupes, the lead dancers have changed.

=== Original characters (1996 show) ===
- Lord of The Dance: Michael Flatley
- Saoirse, the Irish Cailín: Bernadette Flynn
- Morrighan the Temptress: Gillian Norris
- Don Dorcha, the Dark Lord: Daire Nolan
- The Little Spirit: Helen Egan
- Erin the Goddess: Ann Buckley

Understudies

- John Carey - Lord of the Dance
- Areleen Ni Bhaoill - Saoirse
- Fiona Harold - Morrighan
- Cian Nolan (Daire Nolan's younger brother) - Don Dorcha

=== 2010 Return of Michael Flatley tour ===
- Lord of The Dance: Michael Flatley
- Saoirse, the Irish Cailín: Bernadette Flynn O'Kane
- Morrighan the Temptress: Ciara Sexton
- Don Dorcha, the Dark Lord: Tom Cunningham
- The Little Spirit: Kate Pomfret
- Erin the Goddess: Deirdre Shannon

Understudies

- James Keegan - Lord of the Dance
- Laura Jones and Sarah Lennon - Saoirse
- Aisling McCabe - Morrighan
- Zoltan Papp - Don Dorcha

Bernadette Flynn toured with the show until 2011. Gillian Norris left the show in early 2000. Daire Nolan left the show shortly after its first run in Epcot in 1999. Mairead Nesbitt moved to Celtic band Celtic Woman. Cora Smyth toured with Flatley in Celtic Tiger until he cancelled the tour due to a viral infection. Anne Buckley performed with the show until the Feet of Flames 2001 tour, at which point she left and has since recorded a solo album.

== Band ==
=== Original band ===
- Dave Keary, Guitar
- Eamon Byrne, Bass guitar
- Gary Sullivan, Drums
- Máiréad Nesbitt and Cora Smyth, Fiddles
- Liam O'Connor, Button accordion
- Ger Fahey, Uilleann pipes, keyboards

=== Return tour band ===
- Giada Costenaro and Valerie Gleeson - fiddles
- John Colohan - Guitar
- Eamon Byrne - Bass
- Terry Fahy - Drums
- Kenneth Keary - mandolin
- Willie Dune - bass
- Ger Fahey - pipes, keyboards

== Musical numbers ==
=== Original ===
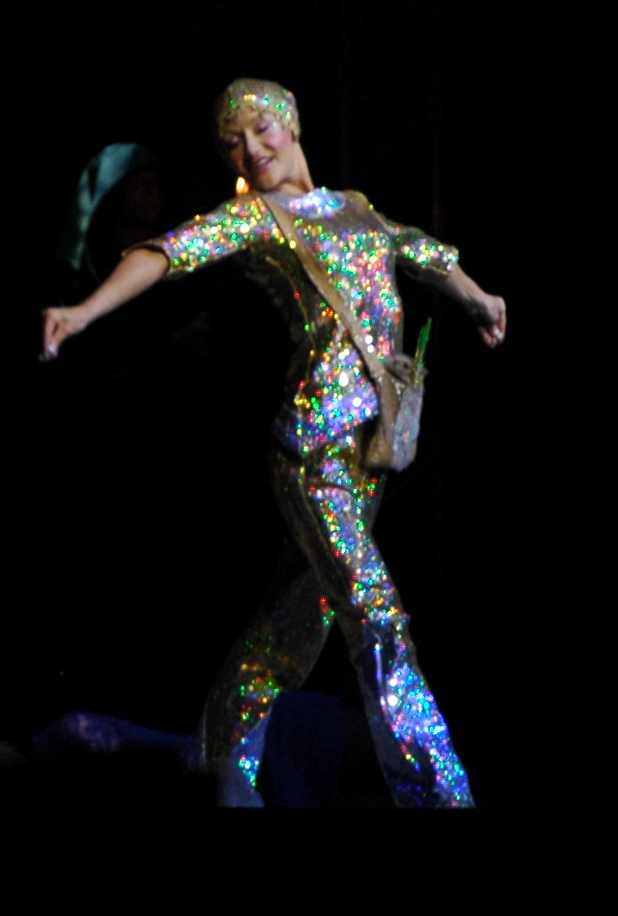
The Little Spirit

Act I

- "Cry of the Celts" - Lord of the Dance, the Clan
- "Suil a Ruin" - Erin the Goddess
- "Celtic Dream" - Saoirse, Girls
- "The Warriors" - Don Dorcha, Warriors
- "Gypsy" - Morrighan
- "Strings of Fire" - The Violins
- "Breakout" - Saoirse, Girls
- "Warlords" - Lord of the Dance, Warlords
- "Gaelic Song" - Erin the Goddess
- "The Lord of the Dance" - Lord of the Dance, the Clan

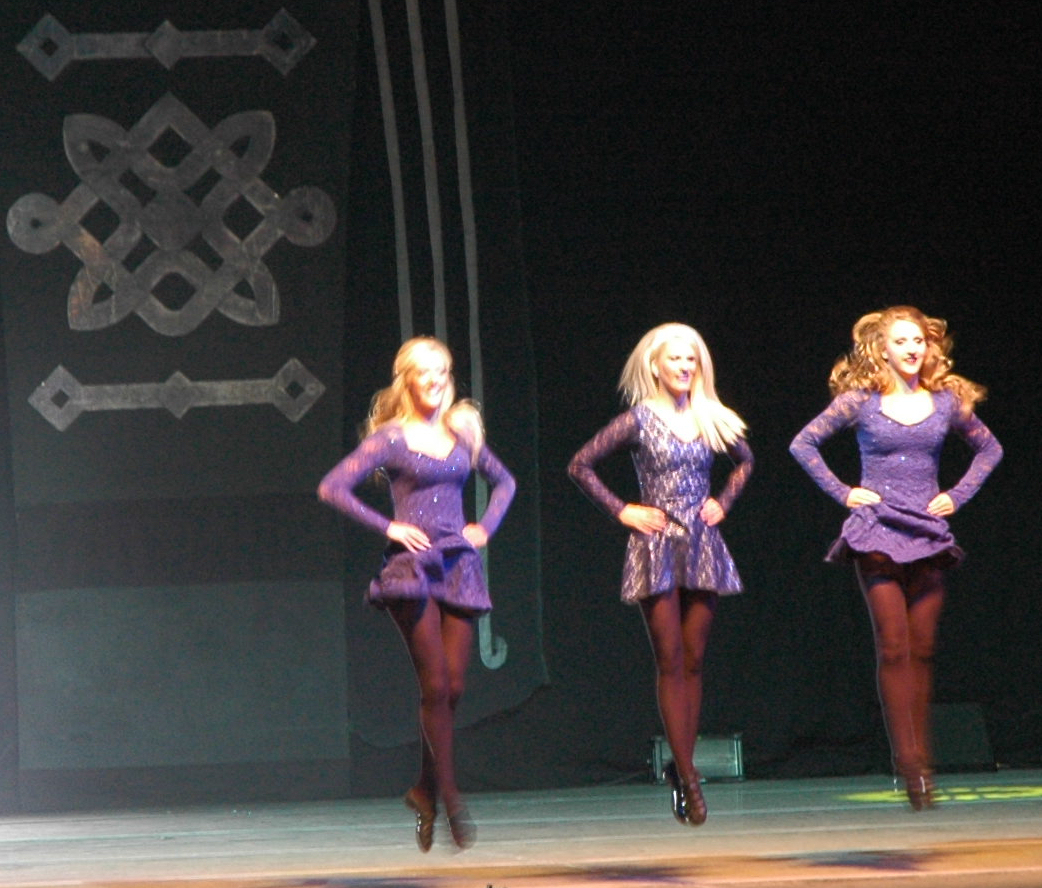
Dancers

Act II

- "Spirit in the New World" - The Spirit
- "Dangerous Game" - The Spirit, Don Dorcha, Warriors
- "Hell's Kitchen" - Lord of the Dance, Don Dorcha, Warlords, Warriors
- "Fiery Nights" - Morrighan, Don Dorcha, Warriors, Their Women
- "The Lament" - The Violins
- "Siamsa" - The Clan
- "She Moved Through the Fair" - Erin the Goddess
- "Stolen Kiss" - Saoirse, Lord of the Dance, Morrighan
- "Nightmare" - Don Dorcha, Warriors
- "The Duel" - Lord of the Dance, Don Dorcha
- "Victory" - Lord of the Dance, the Clan
- "Planet Ireland" - Lord of the Dance, the Clan

=== 2010 return of Flatley tour ===
- Cry of the Celts
- Marble Halls
- Celtic Dream
- Warriors
- Gypsy
- Strings of Fire
- Breakout
- Warlords
- Dance of Love
- The Lord of the Dance
- Celtic Fire

Act II

- Spirit in the New World
- Dangerous Game
- Hell's Kitchen
- Fiery Nights
- The Lament
- Siamsa
- Carrickfergus
- Stolen Kiss
- Nightmare
- The Duel
- Victory
- Feet of Flames
- Planet Ireland

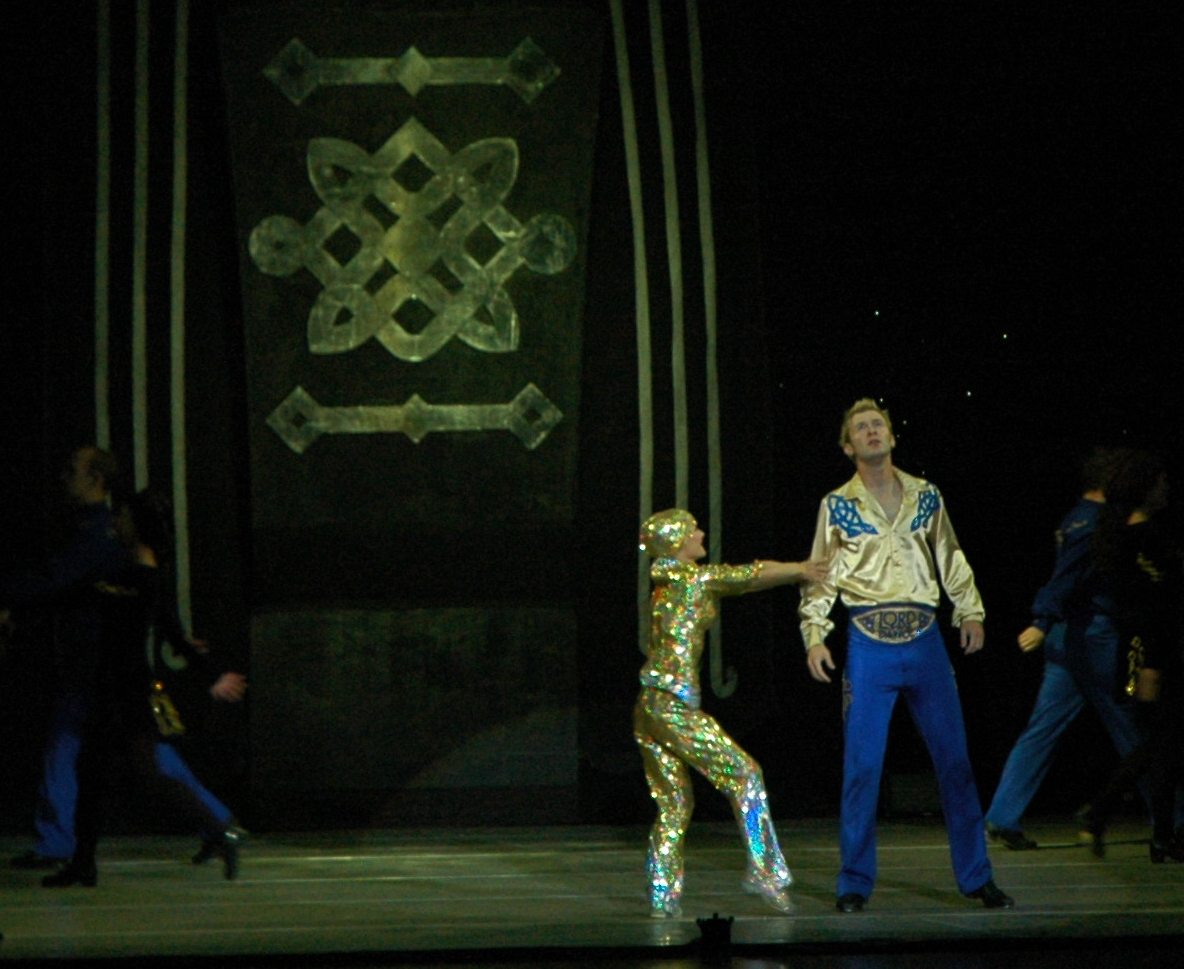
The Little Spirit and the Lord of the Dance

== Recordings ==
Michael Flatley's Lord of the Dance is an album of the music composed by Ronan Hardiman and released in 1996.

=== Track listing ===
1. "Cry of the Celts" – 4:27
2. Suila Ruin" – 3:18
3. Celtic Dream" – 5:39
4. "Warriors" – 3:09
5. "Gypsy" – 2:11
6. "Breakout" – 3:48
7. "The Lord of the Dance" – 4:46
8. "Spirit in the New World" – 1:31
9. "Fiery Nights" – 3:10
10. "Lament" – 3:23
11. "Siamsa" – 4:29
12. "Our Wedding Day" – 3:25
13. "Stolen Kiss" – 3:24
14. "Nightmare" – 3:39
15. Victory" – 2:48
16. "Cry of the Celts" (Bonus Version) – 2:24
17. "The Lord of the Dance" (Bonus Version) – 4:46

=== Charts ===
Chart performance for Michael Flatley's Lord of the Dance
Chart (1996–2000)	Peak position
Australian Albums (ARIA)	9
Austrian Albums (Ö3 Austria)	8
Belgian Albums (Ultratop Flanders)	12
Belgian Albums (Ultratop Wallonia)	37
Dutch Albums (Album Top 100)	33
Finnish Albums (Suomen virallinen lista)	28
German Albums (Offizielle Top 100)	16
Hungarian Albums (MAHASZ)	2
New Zealand Albums (RMNZ)	6
Swedish Albums (Sverigetopplistan)	23
Swiss Albums (Schweizer Hitparade)	46

Michael Flatley's Lord of the Dance was released on video in 1997.

== Tour dates ==
Michael Flatley starred in the show from 1996 to early 1998 before going on to Feet of Flames. This incomplete list includes Troupes 1, 2, 3, and 4.

1996 – with Michael Flatley – 28 June to 30 December: Ireland premiere, United Kingdom, Australia, New Zealand

1997 – with Michael Flatley – 3 January to 27 November: United Kingdom, United States, Canada, Australia

1998 – 11 January to 10 December: England, Germany, Sweden, Finland, Denmark, Belgium, the Netherlands, South Africa, Ireland, Wales, Scotland, Austria, France, Norway.

1999 9 January to 19 December: Israel, Germany, England, Italy, Switzerland, Spain, the Netherlands, Austria, France, Portugal.

2000 26 January to 16 December: Japan, South Africa, France, United States, Germany, Argentina.

2001 21 January to 22 December: Germany, France, Austria, Croatia, Slovenia, Switzerland, Hungary, Bulgaria, Romania, Slovakia, England, the Netherlands, Japan, Russia, Estonia, Belgium.

2002 16 February to 31 December: France, Switzerland, Austria, Germany, the Netherlands, Belgium, Lebanon, England, Finland, Russia, Ukraine,

2003 1 January to 16 December: France, Portugal, Switzerland, Germany, Czech Republic, Hungary, the Netherlands, Belgium, England, Russia, Latvia, Lithuania, Poland, Slovakia, Austria, Italy, Slovenia, Spain,

2004 13 January to 19 December: Taiwan, United Arab Emirates, Germany, Czech Republic, Slovakia, Ukraine, Serbia and Montenegro, Croatia, Switzerland, France, Greece, Czech Republic, South Africa, Israel, China.

2005 12 January to 31 December: Denmark, Sweden, Germany, Luxembourg, Portugal, Czech Republic, Slovakia, Austria, Switzerland, Macedonia, England,

2006 1 January to 26 June: England, Chile

2007 Troupe One – 1 March to 22 December: Poland, United Kingdom, Austria, Switzerland, Luxembourg, Belgium, France, Norway, Finland, Sweden, Denmark, Germany, Greece

2010 – Tour with Michael Flatley – UK, Ireland, Germany, Switzerland, and Austria

2011 - Lord of the Dance - USA

2014-2015 – Lord of the Dance: Dangerous Games had shows at The Palladium, Dominion and Playhouse Theatre in Londons West End and at the Lyric Theatre, Broadway and two touring casts elsewhere at the same time – one was in Sydney, Australia and also in Auckland, New Zealand, the others were spread across Europe. The European tour included countries such as Romania, Bulgaria, Hungary, Slovakia, Czech Republic, Germany, Switzerland, Austria, Luxembourg, Belgium, and Poland.

2022 - 25 Years of Lord Of The Dance United Kingdom, France, Germany, Ireland, Switzerland, Italy
