= Michael Flatley =

American step dancer (born 1958)

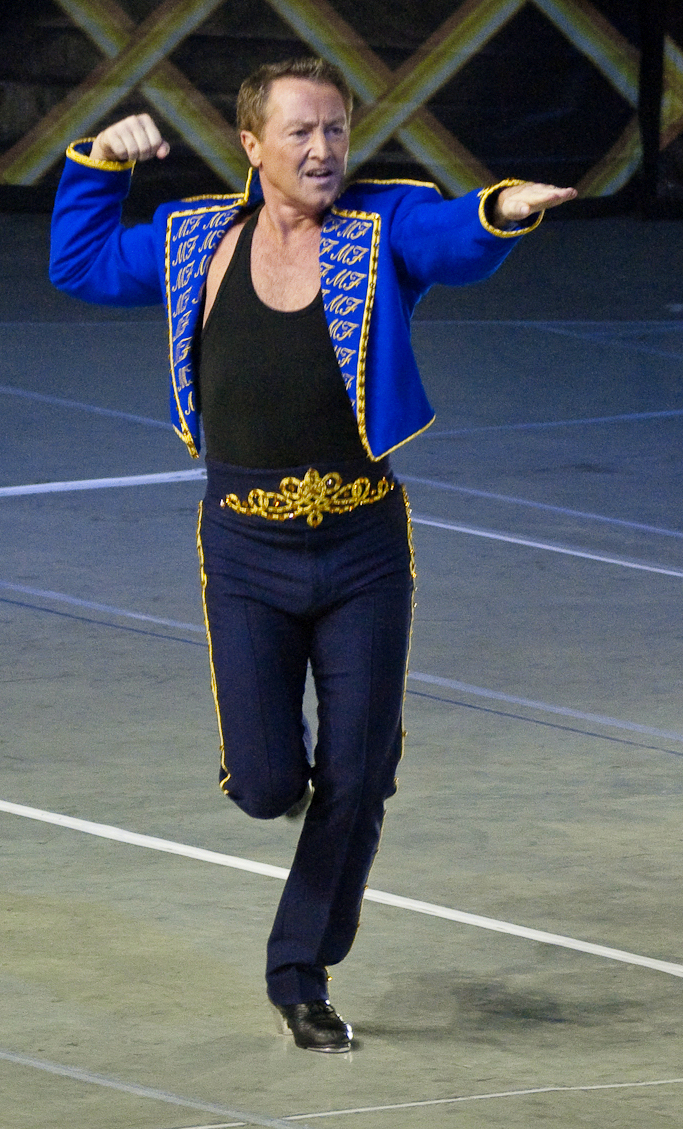
- Flatley on stage, 2009
- Born: Michael Ryan Flatley; July 16, 1958 (age 68)
- Citizenship: United States; Ireland
- Occupation: Dancer
- Years active: 1969–2016
- Known for: Riverdance; Lord of the Dance; Feet of Flames; Celtic Tiger Live
- Spouses: Beata Dziaba (m. 1986; div. 1997); Niamh O'Brien (m. 2006; died 2026)
- Children: 1
- Website: michaelflatley.com

Michael Ryan Flatley (born July 16, 1958) is an American and Irish former professional performer and choreographer of Irish dance. Flatley is credited with reinventing traditional Irish dance by incorporating new rhythms, syncopation, and upper body movements, which were previously absent from the dance. He created and performed in Irish dance shows Riverdance, Lord of the Dance, Feet of Flames, Celtic Tiger Live and Michael Flatley's Christmas Dance Spectacular. Flatley's shows have played to more than 60 million people in 60 countries and have grossed more than $1 billion. He has also been an actor, writer, director, producer, musician, and philanthropist.

Flatley formerly held the Guinness World Record for tap dancing 35 times per second, and his legs were reportedly insured for £25 million. Flatley retired from dance in 2016 due to constant spinal, knee, foot, and rib pain. In January 2023, he was treated for "an aggressive cancer", which is now in remission.

== Early life ==
Michael Ryan Flatley was born on July 16, 1958, the second of five children born to Irish parents Michael James Flatley and Elisabeth "Eilish" Flatley (née Ryan), both of whom had immigrated to the United States in 1947. Michael was a plumber from County Sligo, and Eilish was a gifted step dancer from County Carlow whose mother, Hannah Ryan, was a champion dancer. Michael and Eilish met at an Irish dance in Detroit, and were married in that city on August 25, 1956. They eventually had five children: Anne-Marie, Michael, Eliza, Thomasina, and Patrick. When Michael was two months old, the family moved from Detroit to Chicago's South Side.

In Chicago, Flatley began dance lessons at age eleven with Dennis G. Dennehy at the Dennehy School of Irish Dance. He attended Brother Rice High School, an all-boys Catholic private school. In 1975, at age 17, Flatley was the first American to win a World Irish Dance title at Oireachtas Rince na Cruinne, the Irish dancing championships. In 1975 and 1976, Flatley won twice in the All-Ireland Fleadh Cheoil concert flute competitions.

In the 1970s, Flatley competed in the amateur boxing Chicago Golden Gloves tournament in the 126 pound novice division and won the middleweight division of the Chicago Golden Gloves Boxing Championship. He recorded five knock-out victories. Flatley stated that he continued to flirt with the idea of becoming a professional into the early 1980s, but ultimately stayed with a career in dance. In this early stage of his career he was described as "the white Michael Jackson" by The Hollywood Reporter, the "Rudolph Nureyev of Irish dance" by the Los Angeles Herald-Examiner, and the Washington Post compared his feet to "the hands of Vladimir Horowitz in power and agility". He later became a philanthropic donor to the Golden Gloves organization. In 2023 Flatley was one of four fighters to be named a Titan of Chicago Golden Gloves Boxing during their 100th Anniversary celebrations.

== Career ==
=== Early career ===
After graduating high school, Flatley worked in various fields, including as a stockbroker, a blackjack gambler, and a flautist. From 1978 to 1979, Flatley toured with Green Fields of America. In the 1980s, he toured with The Chieftains, though he was turned down when he requested to become a full-time member of the band.

=== Riverdance ===
After attracting the attention of President of Ireland Mary Robinson and dance-show producers, Flatley was invited to help create an intermission show for the 1994 Eurovision Song Contest. He performed in a 7-minute show titled "Riverdance" for the interval act of the contest, which was held in Ireland. After receiving worldwide acclaim, Flatley pushed to turn the show into a full-length production, which became Riverdance. The show was produced by Moya Doherty, with principal choreography and lead performances by Flatley and Jean Butler. It debuted in February 1995 at the Point Theatre in Dublin.

In September 1995, after the show sold out, Flatley left Riverdance to pursue what would eventually become Lord of the Dance. Flatley had been in a dispute with the Riverdance producers over his salary and royalty fees. He was fired the night before the show was set to begin its second run in London, being replaced by Colin Dunne. He also reportedly did not work well with Butler, though on the split, Flatley said, "I just wanted control over the work that I had created myself. That's all. I don't think that that's too much to ask. I felt like I built it and they took it, and that's the end of it... and it hurt." Flatley paid approximately £1 million to settle a wrongful termination lawsuit from his former manager, John Reid.

=== Lord of the Dance and Feet of Flames ===
After the Riverdance split, Flatley created his own show, Lord of the Dance, which was capable of playing in arenas and stadiums aside from traditional theaters. It premiered in June 1996 at the Point Theatre (now 3Arena) in Dublin, the same venue where Riverdance premiered, then made its U.K. premiere at the London Coliseum. The music for the show was composed by Ronan Hardiman. In 1997, Flatley earned £36 million, making him the 25th-highest earning entertainer in the world.

In 1998, Flatley created an expanded version of the show called Feet of Flames which was a one-off performance and his final performance in Lord of the Dance. It was performed outdoors in the Rotten Row/Route of Kings area of Hyde Park, London on a 4-tier hydraulic stage, with a live band, and over 100 dancers performing on all four levels of the stage during the finale. Ronan Hardiman's music from the original Lord of the Dance was used again, along with new compositions of his. The show had six new numbers, one of which is Flatley's solo.

Following the success of the 1998 Hyde Park show, Flatley produced another version of Feet of Flames in 1999, which included half of the original show and half new material. Titled Feet of Flames: The Victory World Tour, the show was performed also on a multi-level stage and toured Europe in 2000 and the U.S. in 2001.

=== Celtic Tiger ===
Flatley's next show, Celtic Tiger Live, opened in July 2005. The show explores the history of the Irish people and Irish emigration to the U.S., fusing a wide range of dance styles, including jazz. The show also includes popular elements from his previous shows, such as Flatley's flute solos and the line of dancers in the finale.

Flatley wrote "I will be a dancer until the day I die" in the program book of the show.

On November 15, 2006, prior to planned European performances of the show, Flatley was admitted to a London hospital with a viral infection. He was discharged two weeks later, but cancelled the tour.

=== Television performances (2007–2009) ===
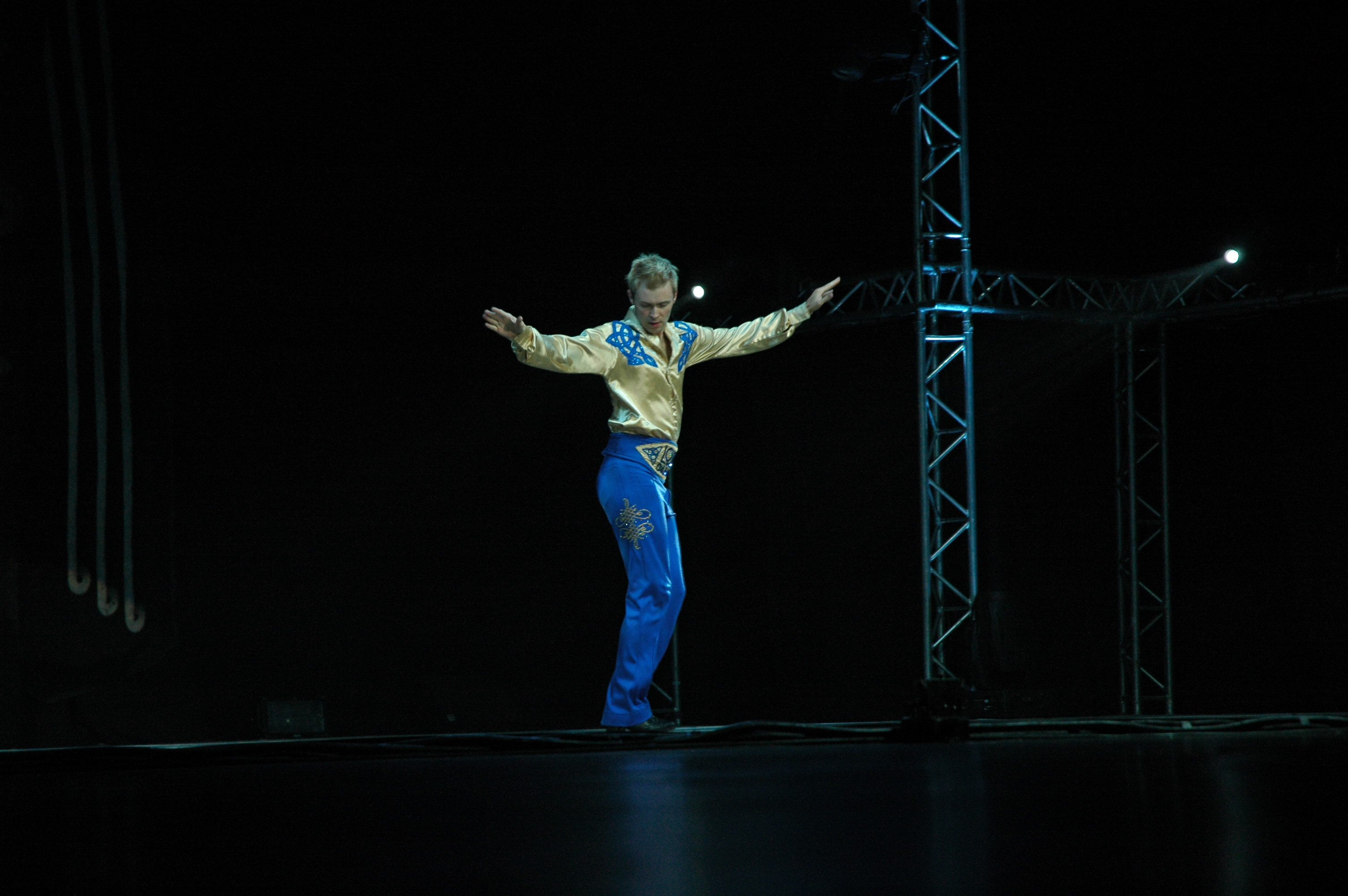
A Lord of the Dance performance in 2008

In November 2007, Flatley and a troupe of male dancers performed on Dancing with the Stars in the U.S. In October 2008, he appeared as a guest judge on an episode of the show, filling in for Len Goodman. He performed the solo "Capone" from Celtic Tiger on the show. Flatley was also the host of Superstars of Dance, an NBC series that ran for five episodes in early 2009. He also performed on The Late Show with Stephen Colbert, during the 1997 Academy Awards ceremony, and was interviewed on Piers Morgan's Life Stories in 2011.

=== Return to the stage (2009–2010) ===
In December 2009, Flatley performed in a limited run of the "Hyde Park" version of Feet of Flames in Taiwan. The run of shows had to be extended to meet the demand for tickets.

In 2010, he returned to headline the Lord of the Dance show, with performances in arenas in the United Kingdom, Ireland, Germany, Switzerland, and Austria. However, unlike the original show, the stage for the 2010 Return Tour was redesigned; it featured new sets, new costumes, state-of-the-art lighting, newer pyrotechnics, and projections.

Lord of the Dance 3D, the 3D film of the return tour, debuted in theaters worldwide in 2011. The 3D film was later released on DVD and Blu-ray under the title, Michael Flatley Returns as Lord of the Dance, and shows performances from the O2 Arenas of London, Dublin, and Berlin.

=== Flute album (2011) ===
In 2011, Flatley released On a Different Note, a flute album. The 25 tracks include airs and tunes he has played in his shows, other traditional tunes, and new compositions.

=== A Night to Remember, Dangerous Games ===
On May 18, 2014, Flatley recorded a one-off 60 minute ITV Music Specials episode titled Michael Flatley: A Night to Remember celebrating his long career. The show aired on June 1, 2014, and was presented by Christine Bleakley.

Also in the same year, Flatley created a revised spin-off of Lord of the Dance, entitled Lord of the Dance: Dangerous Games, which featured a similar storyline with new numbers, as well as new music by Gerard Fahy, who previously served as a bandleader and musical director in Flatley's shows.

=== Injuries, farewell tour, and retirement ===
In May 2015, Flatley revealed that much of his vertebral column was irreparably damaged and that he had a damaged left knee, a torn right calf/triceps surae muscle, two ruptured Achilles tendons, a fractured rib, and a recurring broken bone in his foot. That year, a caricature of him was hung in the Sardi's restaurant on Broadway.

In November 2015, Flatley's show Lord of the Dance: Dangerous Games premiered at the Lyric Theatre, a Broadway theatre. Due to his injuries, Flatley was only able to perform in the final two numbers of the performance. After shows in New York, Flatley went on a final tour in the United States. What was then thought to be Flatley's last show was in Las Vegas on St. Patrick's Day 2016.

=== Later work ===
In January 2017, Flatley introduced his troupe for a performance at the inauguration of Donald Trump as president, which he called "a great honour". In 2021, he helped the World Irish Dancing Championships, a competition that he won in 1975, to launch a new competition for freestyle dance. The competition attracted over 2,500 entrants.

Flatley made a one-off return to the stage during the 30th anniversary of Lord of the Dance, performing in the finale.

== Other ventures ==
=== Filmmaker ===
In 2018, Flatley wrote, directed, financed and starred in Blackbird, a spy film set in Barbados, Ireland and the UK. The film co-stars Patrick Bergin and Eric Roberts. Blackbird had its world premiere in a private showing at the Raindance Film Festival in London, where Flatley was also a member of the Festival Jury. As of November 2018 pre-production work had already begun on Flatley's second film, titled Dreamdance, set in Hollywood at the outbreak of World War II. Blackbird premiered August 2022 in the Light House Cinema in Dublin. The film was critically panned. It received a one star review from Peter Bradshaw in The Guardian, while Flatley received the Best Actor award from the Monaco Streaming Film Festival for his role in the film. When reporting on the award, the Irish Post described the plot of the film as "A Casablanca-inspired spy thriller, Blackbird centres on Flatley as a retired intelligence operative who finds his quiet life running a hotel in Barbados thrown into chaos when an old friend turns up and draws him back into the world he left behind."

=== Artist ===
Starting in the early 2010s, Flatley has used his choreographer dance moves to create artwork with his feet, by dancing upon paint splattered canvas. A series of paintings he created in the mid-2010s was based upon the Great Irish Famine. As of April 2015, Flatley was second only to Jack Butler Yeats in terms of the auction price of paintings by Irish painters sold in Ireland in the year-to-date.

=== Food and beverage industry ===
Around this time he also founded the food and beverage company Castlehyde, named after his residential estate. His net worth was reportedly €301 million in 2019.

=== Politics ===
In July 2025, Flatley expressed interest in running for President of Ireland; however, in September 2025, he withdrew from the race.

== Awards and achievements ==
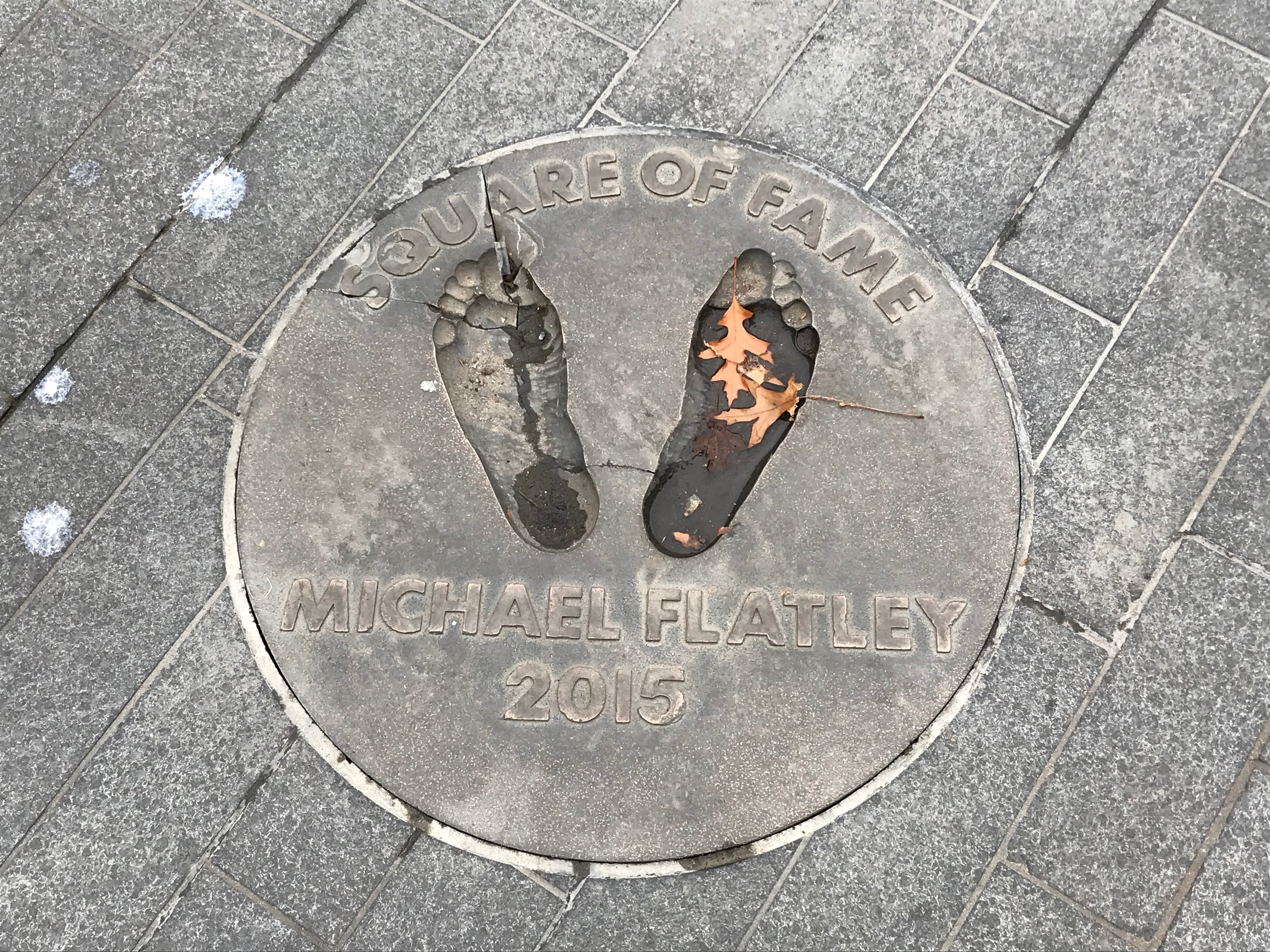
Flatley's feet at Wembley Square of Fame

In 1988, Flatley received a National Heritage Fellowship, the highest folk-related honor awarded by the US National Endowment for the Arts.

In December 2001, Flatley became the first recipient of the Irish Dancing Commission Fellowship award (an honorary degree in Irish dance), and was also made a Fellow of the American Irish Dance Teachers' Association. In 2003 Flatley received a special award from Prince Rainier of Monaco for his charity work, and in March 2003 Irish America magazine named Flatley Irish American of the Year. In 2004, Flatley received an honorary doctorate degree from University College Dublin, and that same year received the prestigious Ellis Island Medal of Honor in New York. In 2016 he received an honorary degree from the University of Limerick.

In 2007, the Freedom of the City of Cork was conferred on Flatley at a ceremony in Cork's City Hall. In 2008, he was awarded the Freedom of the Borough of Sligo at a ceremony in Sligo City Hall. Also in 2008, The Variety Club of Ireland presented Flatley with the Entertainer of the Decade Award.

In 2011, he was inducted into Irish America magazine's Irish America Hall of Fame.

On October 24, 2013, Flatley received the Lifetime Achievement Award at The Irish Post Awards on Park Lane. In 2015, a section of 42nd Street and Broadway in New York City was named "Flatley Way" for the artist. The honour corresponded with his opening of his show Lord of the Dance: Dangerous Games at the nearby Lyric Theatre. He received the Freedom of the City of London honour from London, UK, which names a number of specific actions those who receive the honor can take that others cannot—such as the ability to "drive a herd of sheep over London Bridge". In 2024, Prince Albert of Monaco presented Flatley with the CC Forum award for outstanding contribution to global humanitarian causes.

== Personal life ==
In addition to his native-born American citizenship, Flatley is a citizen of Ireland.

=== Relationships and family ===
Flatley met Beata Dziaba in London's Royal Albert Hall. The couple married in 1986 in a Danish registry office; they divorced in 1997 after his multiple affairs with other women. In the early 2000s, Flatley was engaged to Lisa Murphy.

In June 2006, Flatley began dating Niamh O'Brien, a longtime dancer from several of his shows. His first marriage in a civil wedding was not recognized in Catholic canon law, so the 48-year-old Flatley and O'Brien, 32, were able to have a Catholic ceremony. On October 14, 2006, they married at St. Patrick's Church in Fermoy, County Cork, with a reception at Flatley's historic Castlehyde House in Cork. They have a son, Michael St. James, born in 2007. O'Brien's death was reported on October 5, 2026, aged 52 years old.

=== Health ===
In 2003, Flatley was treated for a melanoma, after a viewer of MTV pointed out a brown spot on the side of Flatley's face which Flatley himself had not noticed. In January 2023, he was treated for "an aggressive cancer", which is now in remission.

=== Properties ===
In 1997, Flatley purchased Park Villas Place in London after a bidding war against Madonna; he sold the home in 2024.

In 2001, Flatley purchased Castlehyde House, originally owned by Douglas Hyde, the first president of Ireland, near Fermoy in north-east Cork, then in a derelict condition, for €3 million. Flatley spent €27 million renovating the mansion and another €20 million furnishing it with artwork and antiques. He listed Castlehyde for sale for €20 million but pulled it from the market after deciding he could not part with the property.

In 2015, Flatley purchased a mansion in Belgravia, just off Eaton Square, for €28 million.

In addition to Castlehyde and his London mansion, Flatley owns properties in the Caribbean, New York, Beverly Hills, France, Italy and Villefranche-sur-Mer.

His primary residence is in Monaco.

=== Other ===
Flatley has invested a significant portion of his wealth in Berkshire Hathaway.

In 2003, courts ruled that Flatley was extorted and defamed by real estate agent Tyna Marie Robertson, who falsely accused Flatley of sexual assault. Robertson was ordered to pay $11 million compensation.

In 2006, Flatley released Lord of the Dance: My Story, his autobiography.

Flatley inspired the Cypriot dance duo Stavros Flatley.

In 2010, Flatley dedicated the Garden of Memory and Music in Culfadda, County Sligo, the village his father left to seek a new life in America. The ceremony included a speech and an impromptu performance of one of his father's favorite tunes.

=== Arms ===
Coat of arms of Michael Ryan Flatley
Notes Recorded in Volume Aa folio 69 of Grants and Confirmations of Arms Granted 9 September 2015 Crest From an ancient Irish crown Or a stag's head Argent attired of the first Torse A wreath of the colours Helm A helmet mantled Gules doubled Argent Escutcheon Party per fess dancettée Or and Azure a pile [sic] wavy counterchanged Motto Pede Libero Tellurem Pulsar Symbolism This horizontal, three-pointed, partition of the field of the shield is heraldically called dancetée while the pale wavy resembles a river, therefore alluding to his dancing career.

== Fundraising ==
In 2010, Flatley participated in the fundraising JP McManus Pro-Am in Adare, County Limerick, Ireland. In 2020 he created the "Flatley'sTapForTen challenge" in order to raise money for people found homeless due to the COVID-19 pandemic, benefiting the charities Depaul in Ireland and Centrepoint in the UK. He is also a supporter of The Ireland Fund of Great Britain that provides social support for Irish citizens living in the UK. He has also spent time as an advocate for cancer research. In 2021, Flatley was named an Ambassador of Culture for Co Saolfada, a cancer research advocacy program. Flatley himself was diagnosed with melanoma in 2003 and has since recovered. Flatley has also advocated an anti-war sentiment - in 2003 he performed the anti-war piece Warlord before an audience of national leaders meeting in St. Petersburg. In 2022 he spoke out against the Russian invasion of Ukraine and noted that performances of Lord of the Dance would raise money for related humanitarian relief efforts.

== See also ==
- List of dancers
