= Solo dance =

Dance by single performer

A solo dance is a dance done by an individual dancing alone, as opposed to couples dancing together but independently of others dancing at the same time, if any, and as opposed to groups of people dancing simultaneously in a coordinated manner. Solo dancers are usually the best dancers in a group or dance school. Most solo dancers start after about 6–7 years of dance or sooner. Most soloists are company kids from their dance school. They are usually in more than one dance.

In Comparsas, there are various soloists who strut in front. They usually dance at the edges of the street so that the viewing public can appreciate their moves. Most male soloists carry a large lantern-like artifact on a large pole, resting on an oily pouch, which they spin at will. Dance is a way to express emotions.

== See also ==
- Sean-nós dance
- Sean-nós dance in America
- Irish dance
- Step dance
- Stepping (African-American)
