= Irish dance =

Traditional dances from Ireland

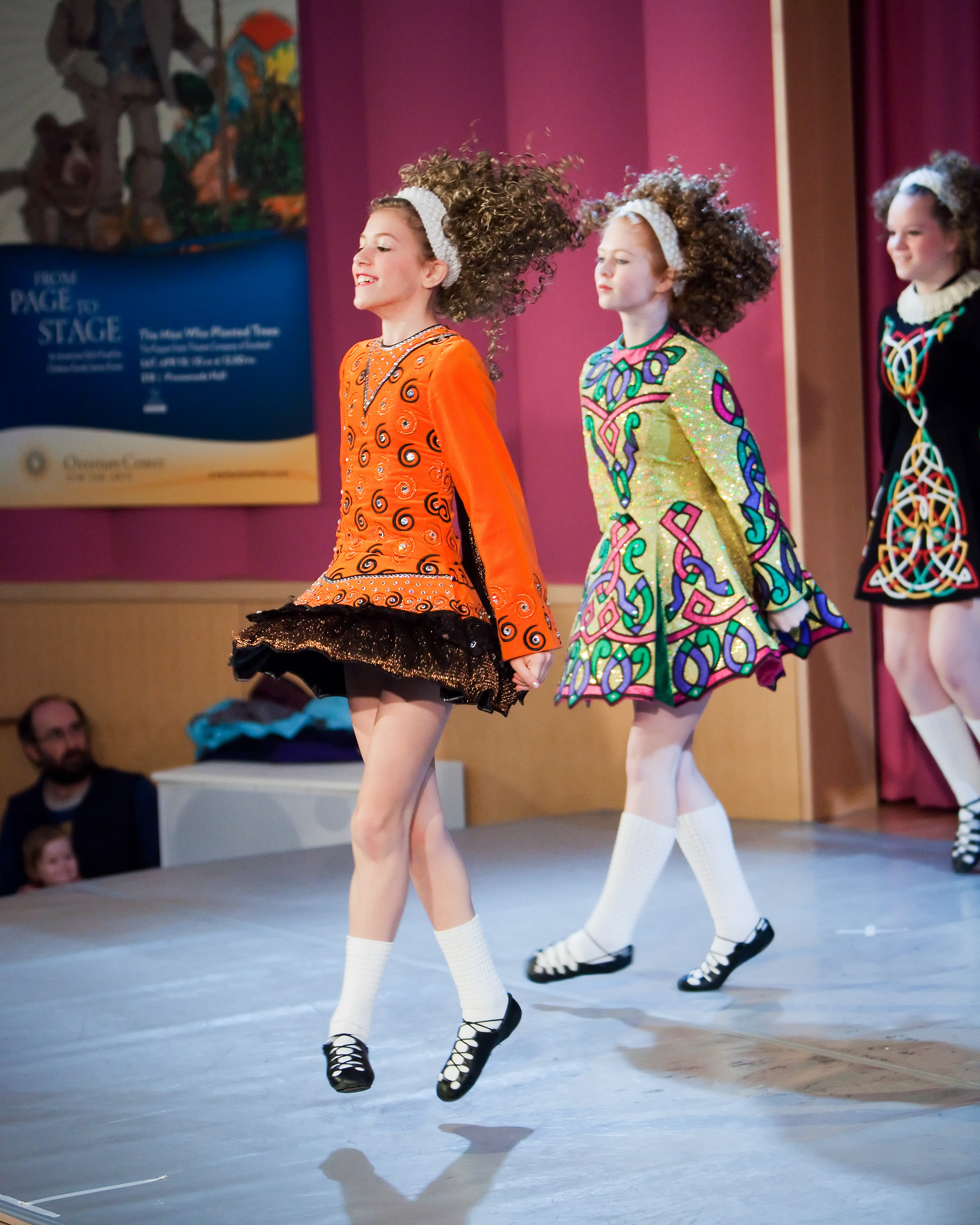
- Most modern Irish dancers wear elaborate competition dresses, large wigs, and makeup for performance and competition purposes.
- Medium: Dance
- Types: Ceili dance; Irish stepdance; Festival Irish dance; Sean-nós dance; Irish set dance; Competition dance
- Ancestor arts: English country dance; Possibly French quadrille
- Originating culture: Irish
- Originating era: 18th century

Irish dance refers to the traditional dance forms that originate in Ireland, including both solo and group dance forms, for social, competitive, and performance purposes. In the 17th and 18th centuries, dance was taught by "travelling dance masters" across Ireland, and separate dance forms developed according to regional practice and differing purposes. Irish dance became a significant part of Irish culture, particularly for Irish nationalist movements. From the early 20th century, a number of organisations promoted and codified the various forms of dance, creating competitive structures and standardised styles. Irish dancers who compete for competitive reasons dance in a dance style that is more modern than traditional Irish dance. It is mainly done solo, but there is some team dancing in groups of 2, 3, 4, 6, 8, 10, 16 or more.

Solo Irish dance includes the most well-known form of Irish dance, Irish stepdance, which was popularized from 1994 onwards by shows such as Riverdance, and which is practised competitively across not only the Irish diaspora but by many people of disparate cultural backgrounds. Stepdance is characterised by the rigid upper body and intricate footwork of its performers. Other forms of solo Irish dance include sean-nós dance, a relaxed and social dance style involving improvised steps, and festival Irish dance, a style which separated from step dance in the mid-20th century.

Irish group dancing has some French influences, and was particularly influenced by the French quadrille in the late 18th century. Ceili dance, practised both competitively and socially, is performed by groups of two to sixteen people, and often uses traditional or codified dances and formations. Its footwork is simple, and emphasis is placed on the figures and formations of the dances. Set dance is primarily a social tradition, for groups of four dancers, and includes elements of the intricate footwork found in step dance.

== History ==
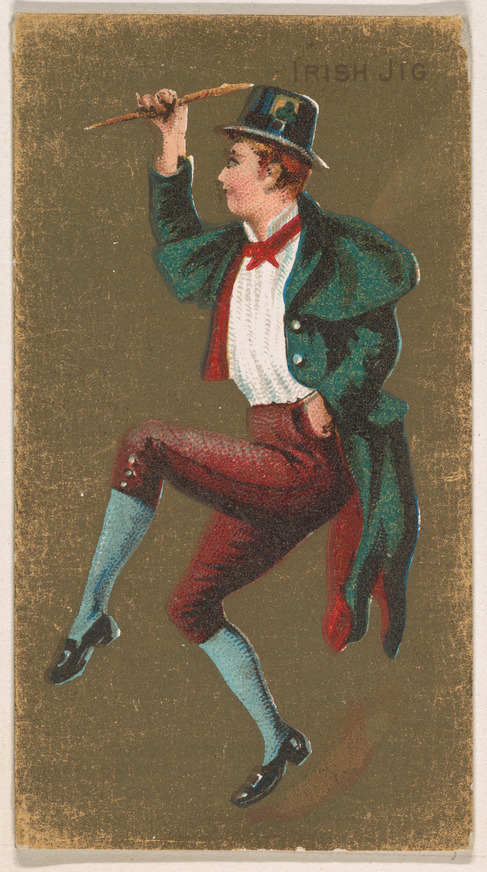
Irish Jig, from National Dances (N225, Type 2) issued by Kinney Bros 1889

There is very little documentary evidence of dance being practised in Ireland prior to the 7th century; this could be due to the destruction of written records in Ireland during Viking raids. Scholars have hypothesised this is from non-literate nature of the Irish cultural tradition. Indeed, the modern Irish words for "dance", rince and damhsa did not develop until the 16th century. The scant evidence available is primarily that of visitors to Ireland, such as a fourteenth-century song written in the South of England, where the poet invites his listeners to "come ant daunce wyt me in Irlaunde". The first native Irish documentary evidence of dancing is an account of a Mayor of Waterford's visit to Baltimore, County Cork in 1413, where the attendees "took to the floor" to celebrate Christmas Eve. However, the Norman invasion of Ireland in the twelfth century may have brought with it the round dance tradition, as it was contemporaneously performed in British camps while every now and then being seen in a Norman stronghold.

Accounts of dancing in the 17th century means that dancing was by that time extremely widespread throughout Ireland. In 1674 Richard Head wrote in reference to Ireland, 'In every field a fiddle, and the lasses footing till they all of a foam,' suggesting some type of Irish dancing or dance with heavy foot movement. There is ample evidence of Irish jigs or Irish dancing in the 16th century, in 1569 Sir Henry Sydney sent a letter to Queen Elizabeth in which he expresses his enthusiasm for the Irish jigs, or fiddle of Galway. A report from 1600 mentions that some forms of Irish dances were similar in form to English country dances, and later references mention the "rinnce fada", also known as the "long dance" or "fading". This dance, performed to a jig tune though not to any particular piece of music, became the customary conclusion to balls held in Ireland towards the end of the seventeenth century. At this time, dancing was commonly accompanied by musicians playing bagpipes or the Jew's harp. By the 1760s, the distinctive hornpipe rhythm of the Irish dance tradition had developed, and with the introduction of the fiddle to Ireland from the European continent, a new class of "dancing master" began to emerge. Reference to the Irish fiddle can also be found in John Dunton's Teague Land: or A Merry Ramble to the Wild Irish (1698) he says “on Sundays and Holydays, all the people resorted with the piper and fiddler to the village green, suggesting the fiddle was introduced to Ireland much earlier then 1760.

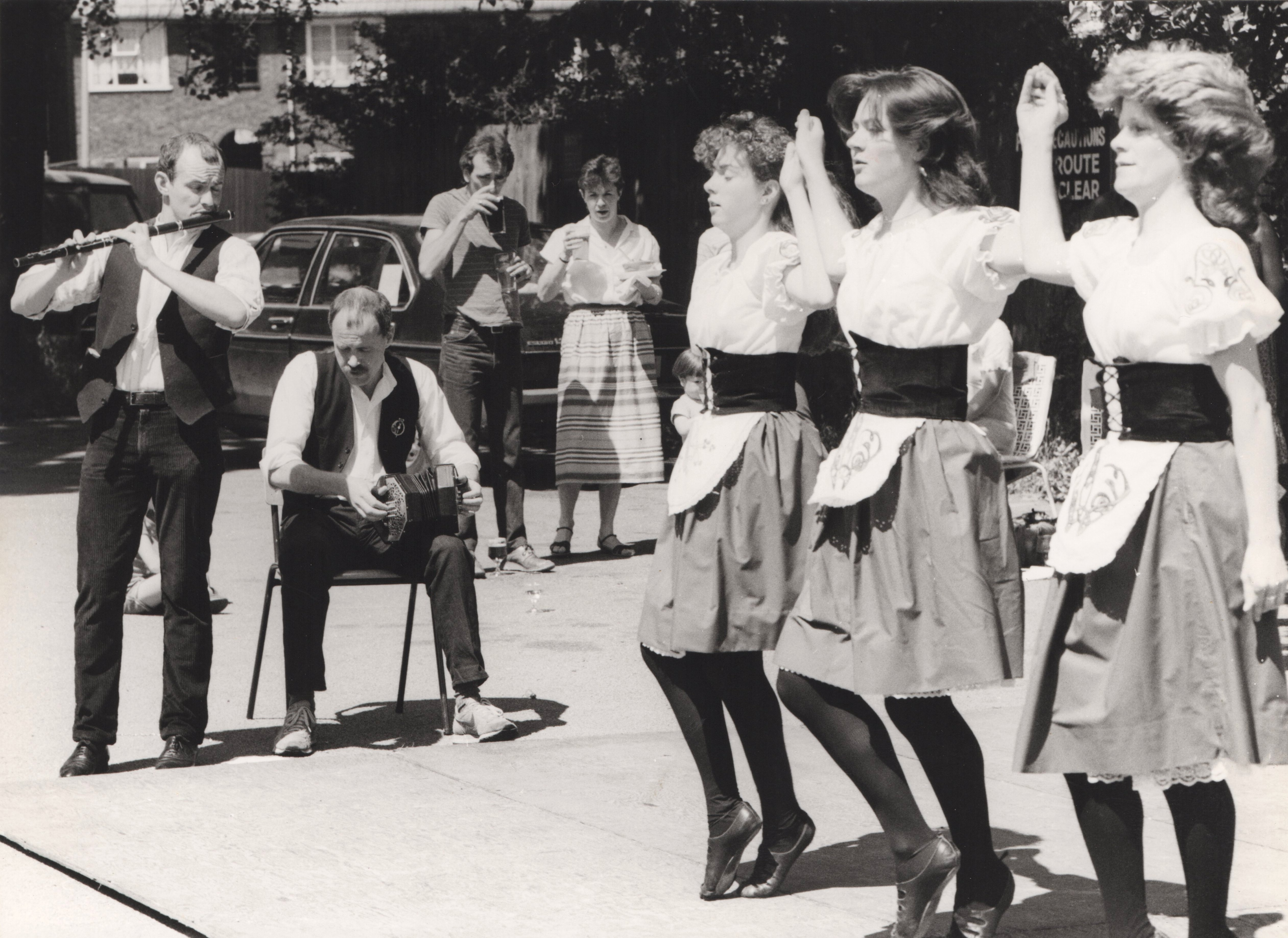
Irish musicians and dancers, 1985

The dancing traditions of Ireland probably grew in association with traditional Irish music. Although its origins are unclear, it was possibly later influenced by dance forms from the Continent, such as the Quadrille. Travelling dancing masters taught across Ireland as late as the 18th and early 19th centuries. Because local venues were usually small, dances were often demonstrated on tabletops, or even the tops of barrels. As a result, these early styles are characterised by the arms held rigidly at the sides, and a lack of lateral movement. As larger dance venues became available, styles grew to include more movement of the body and around the dance area.

Dancing in Ireland was never banned by the English but gatherings of two or more Irish people were. The Catholic church lobbied the Irish government to gain social control via the Public Dance Halls Act of 1935, which tried to ban private dancing, but this only referred to set dancing. Modern Irish step dancing was influenced by the Gaelic League due to the dislike of dances that were deemed "Too English or French".

== Irish dance ==
Accounts of dancing in the 17th century suggest that dancing was by that time extremely widespread throughout Ireland. In 1674 Richard Head wrote in reference to Ireland, 'In every field a fiddle, and the lasses footing till they all of a foam,' suggesting some type of Irish dancing or dance with heavy foot movement. There is ample evidence of Irish jigs or Irish dancing in the 16th century, in 1569 Sir Henry Sydney sent a letter to Queen Elizabeth in which he expresses his enthusiasm for the Irish jigs, or fiddle of Galway. A variety of forms of solo Irish Dance have developed which are described as dance. These include the well-known "modern" stepdance performed competitively; old-style stepdance, which is closer in style to the dance practised by 19th-century travelling dance masters; and festival dance, which separated from modern stepdance over stylistic and administrative disputes in the mid-20th century.

=== Modern dance ===
Irish dancers from Connemara Irish dancers in Wilkes-Barre, PA, dance at the Hetzel Union Building (HUB), Penn State University.

The most predominant form of Irish dance is that popularised by the Broadway show Riverdance, and other Irish dancing stage shows since the late 20th century. Characterised by a rigid torso and dances performed high on the balls of the feet, this style became distinct from the late 19th century when the Gaelic League began efforts to preserve and promote Irish dance as part of a broader nationalist movement concerned with Irish culture. Although a rigid torso may be the initial characterisation of Irish dance, modern soft shoe Irish dancers commonly gracefully use their arms in flowing movements, abandoning the traditional form. It is not uncommon for hard shoe dancers to use their arms in strict hand formations other than arms at sides, though competition dance continues to require the arms be kept by the dancer's sides.

This, we think, as we watch Owen's clogs whisk themselves into a buckled blur, is essentially yodelling for feet: a majestic, preposterous lower-body hysteria that should surely be accompanied by its own laughter track. It's magnificent, gasp-inducing stuff. —Sarah Dempsey describing an Irish dancer.

In 1929, the League formed An Coimisiún Le Rincí Gaelacha (CLRG, The Irish Dancing Commission) in order to codify and standardise stepdancing competition and education. Over the following decades, CLRG expanded globally, and promoted this particular form of stepdance by developing examinations and qualifications for teachers and competition adjudicators. Today, stepdance in the style codified by the Gaelic League is performed competitively in a number of countries, and under the auspices of a number of organisations which have at various times broken away from CLRG.

==== Dances ====
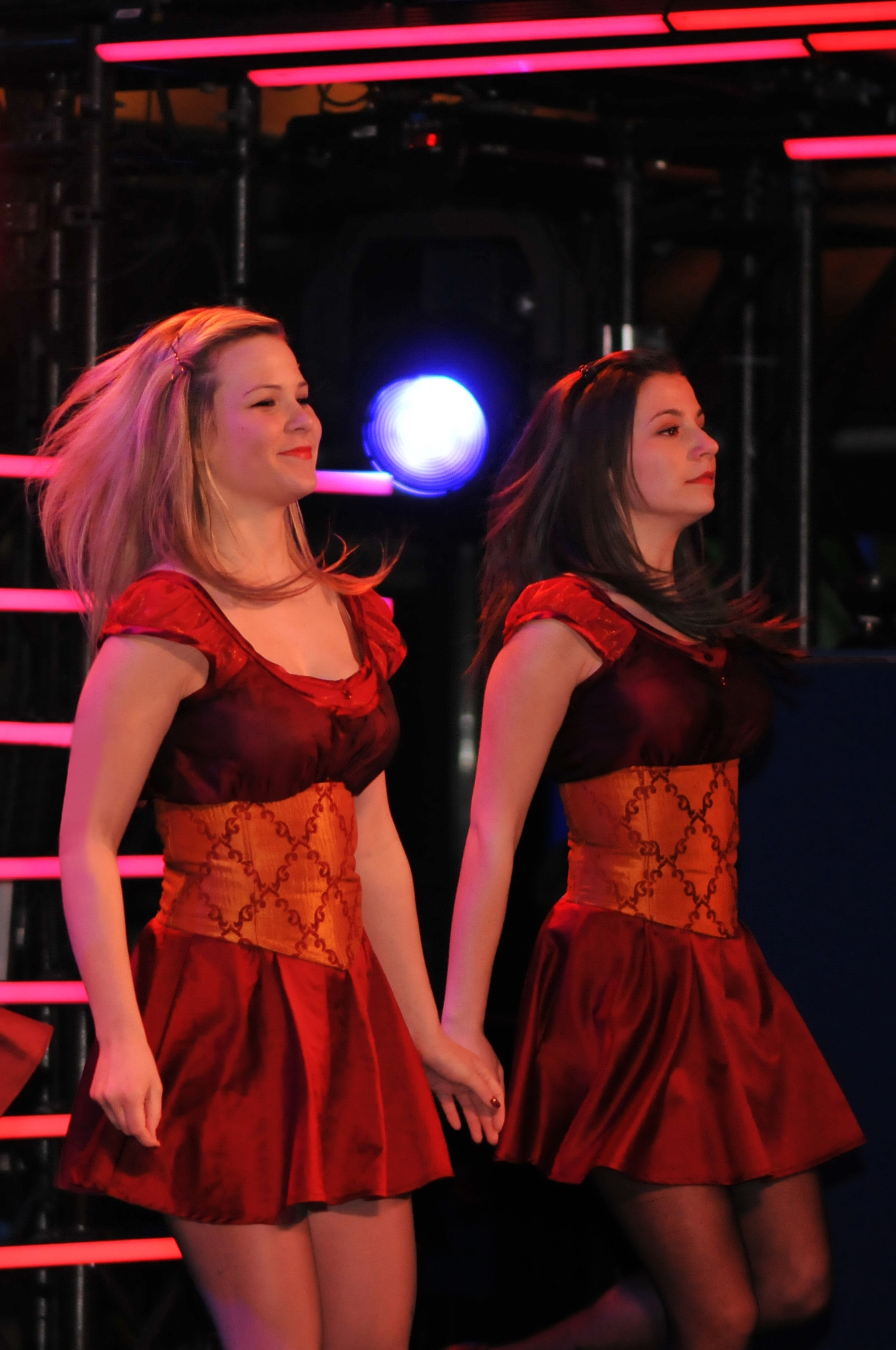
An untraditional dance style

Irish solo dances fall into two broad categories based on the shoes worn: 'hard shoe' (also known as jig shoe or heavy shoe) and 'soft shoe' (or light shoe) dances.

There are four soft shoe dance styles: the reel, slip jig, light jig and 'single jig' (also referred to as 'hop jig'). Reels have a 4/4 (or sometimes 2/4 or 2/2) time signature. Slip jigs are in 9/8 time. Light and single jigs are in 6/8 time, with different emphasis within the measure distinguishing the music.

Hard shoe dances include the hornpipe in syncopated 2/4 or 4/4 time, the treble jig (also called the 'heavy jig' or 'double jig') in a slow 6/8, the treble reel (a short sixteen bar hard shoe dance done to reel music) and 'traditional sets', which are a group of dances with set music and steps. Many traditional sets have irregular musical phrasing. There are multiple traditional sets, including St. Patrick's Day, Blackbird, Job of Journeywork, Three Sea Captains, Garden of Daisies, and King of the Fairies. While theoretically standardised, different organisations recognise different traditional sets and slight variations exist between teachers. There are also "non-traditional sets" done by advanced dancers. These have set music, but not steps; the steps are choreographed by individual dance schools.

Competitive dancers generally dance two or three steps at a time, depending on their dancing level. Each step lasts for sixteen bars of music for the treble jig and the reel. Dances such as the hornpipe and slip jig instead have eight bars of music for their third steps. The dances are each danced starting with the right foot for eight bars, then repeated with the left foot for the last eight bars, doing the same movements with the opposite feet. Set dances, however, have a different format. The dancer usually dances one step, which is limited to the length of the first part of the music that is repeated (often eight bars, though this varies depending on the specific set dance), and is then repeated, resembling the steps of other dances. Then the dancer usually dances a "set" which is not repeated. It is a highly sought after and competitive feat to recall to dance this "third round" — at regional, national, and world competitions, only a small percentage (typically the top half of dancers graded after the first two rounds) of dancers are invited back to perform.

The Céilí dances used in competitions are more precise versions of those danced in less formal settings. There is a list of 30 Céilí dances which have been standardised and published in An Coimisiún's Ar Rinncidhe Foirne as examples of typical Irish folk dances; these are called the "book" dances by competitive stepdancers. Most Irish dancing competitions only ask for a short piece of any given dance, in the interests of time and the endurance of the dancers.

==== Shoes and costume ====
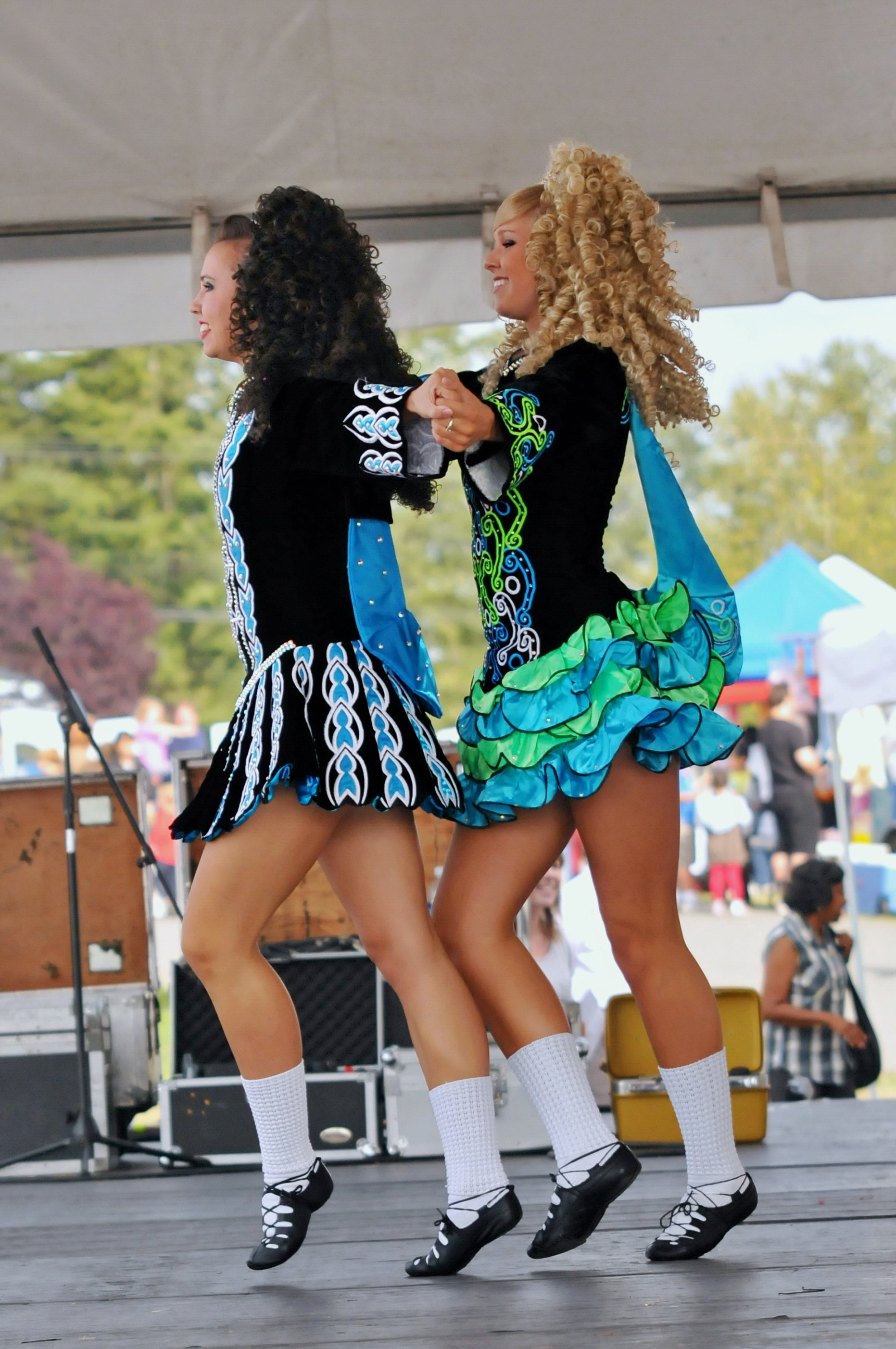
Shoes and costume

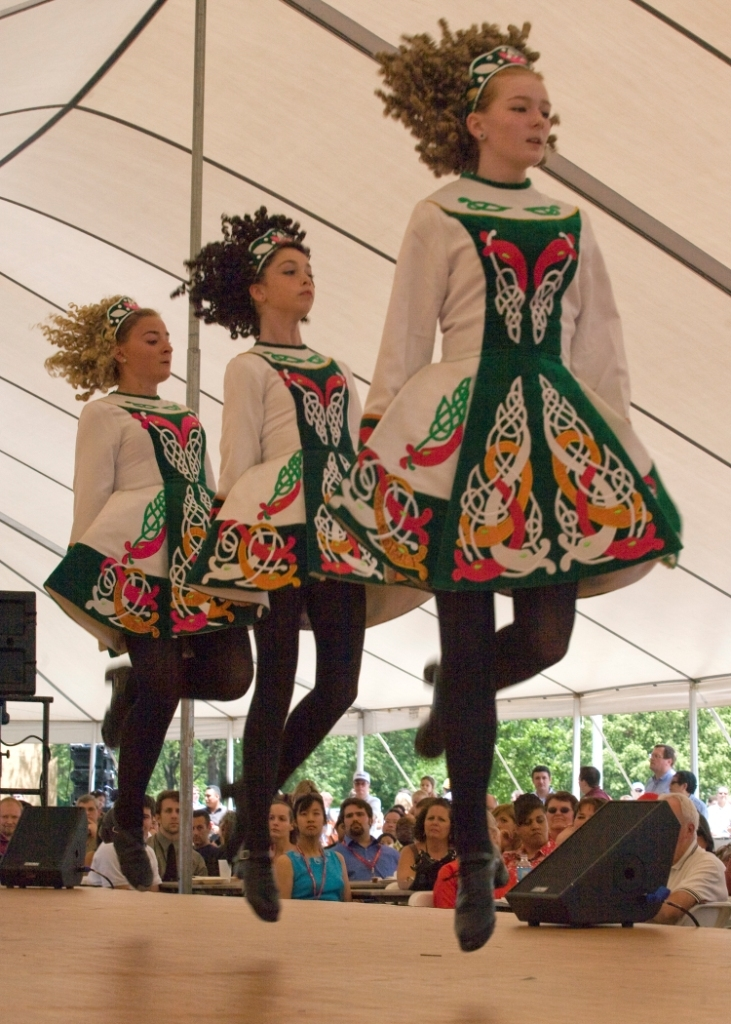
Irish dancers in team costume

There are two types of shoes; soft shoes (also known as ghillies or pumps) and hard shoes. Hard shoes are similar to tap shoes, except that the tips and heels are made of fiberglass, instead of metal, and are significantly bulkier. Another aspect of the hard shoe that sets it apart from a tap shoe is its ability to go "on block" or en pointe. The first hard shoes had wooden or leather taps with metal nails. Later the taps and heels were made of resin or fiberglass to reduce the weight and to make the sounds louder. The soft shoes, which are called ghillies, are black leather lace-up shoes similar to ballet slippers. Ghillies are only worn by girls, while boys wear black leather shoes called "reel shoes", which resemble black jazz shoes with a hard heel. Boy's soft-shoe dancing features audible heel clicks and stomps. A new trend includes adding white laces to the soft shoes, and white tape to the straps of the hard shoes to blend in with the sock and give the illusion of elongating the legs.

Several generations ago, the appropriate dress for a competition was simply "Sunday best" (clothes one would wear to church). Irish Dance schools generally have school dresses, worn by lower-level competitors, in public performances, and in team competitions. As dancers advance in competition or are given starring roles in public performances, they may get a solo dress of their own design and colours or wear the team dress. In the 1970s and 1980s, ornately embroidered dresses became popular. Today even more ornamentation is used on girls' dresses, including rhinestones, sequins, and other bling. Solo dresses are unique to each dancer. Today most women and girls wear a wig, a bun or hairpiece for a competition, but some still curl their own hair. Costumes are heavily integrated into the Irish dance culture and feature traditional elements of classic peasant wear adorned with Celtic designs. Most men wear a shirt, vest or jacket, and tie paired with black trousers. The vest or jacket of the men's costume is also commonly adorned with crystals, traditional knotwork, and embroidery. Each Irish dance school has its own distinctive full skirted dress, often featuring lace or an embroidered pattern copied from the medieval Irish Book of Kells.

==== Competition structure ====
An organised dance competition is referred to as a feis (plural feiseanna). The word feis means "festival" in Irish, and strictly speaking would also have competitions in music and crafts. Féile (IPA: [ˈfʲeːlʲə]) is a more correct term for the dance competition, but the terms may be used interchangeably. Dance competitions are divided by age and level of expertise. The names of the levels and other organising rules vary between countries and regions. Dancers are scored based on technique (placement of the feet, turn out, off of their heels, etc.), style (grace, power, etc.) and other items such as timing, rhythm, carriage, choreography and sounds in their hard shoe dances.

In most organizations, the lower and entry levels of Irish dance include beginner 1 and beginner 2, in which dancers mostly compete soft shoe dances. Then, after around 2 years of experience at these levels, dancers can advance to the intermediate levels, which include novice and prizewinner. At these levels, most dancers are competing five to six dances including both hard shoe and soft shoe. To advance through each of the levels, the dancer must receive specific placements in each of their dances. After obtaining a first place in each of their prizewinner dances (or by teacher discretion), a dancer can move up into the preliminary champion level (PC). At the PC level, dancers usually compete a longer soft shoe, hard shoe, and set dance, and then get an overall score for each of their dances combined. After obtaining two to three overall first places at the PC level, dancers can move into the highest level open champion (OC), where they compete a longer hard shoe and soft shoe, and set dance. The set dance at the champion level is a long hard shoe danced where the dancer is alone on stage and it focuses largely on advanced rhythm and timing. Within the PC and OC levels, dancers can qualify for the regional championships, Oireachtas. From Oireachtas placements, dancers can qualify for various National and World Championships.

An Coimisiún dancers take part in their annual regional Championship competition, which is known as an oireachtas (IPA: [ˈɛɾʲaxt̪ˠəsˠ]). An Coimisiún also holds various "national" championship competitions. These are qualifying events for Oireachtas Rince na Cruinne, or "The World Championships". An Coimisiún's World Championships are the largest of all Irish step dance organisations, with over 6,000 dancers competing from over 30 countries worldwide. The Aisling Award (pronounced 'Ashling', Gaelic for dream) is awarded to the highest placing dancer in each solo dancing category from outside of Ireland, the United Kingdom, the US and Canada to encourage them to continue their dream of dancing. Other smaller Irish step dance organisations host their own premier championship.

Oireachtas Rince na Cruinne, or "The World Championships" (for An Coimisiún dancers), first took place in Dublin in 1970 at Coláiste Mhuire, a school in Parnell Square. The "Worlds" outgrew its original location and moved around the Republic of Ireland and Northern Ireland. In 2002, for the first time, the "Worlds" left Ireland for Glasgow. In 2009, for the first time, the World Championships were held in the United States, in Philadelphia. The 2010-2019 championships were held in Glasgow, Dublin, Belfast, Boston, London, Montréal, Glasgow, Dublin, Glasgow, and Greensboro, respectively, always taking place during the week leading up to Easter Sunday, when the championships end. The BBC documentary film Jig provided an insight into championship level dancers competing in the 2010 World Championships held in Glasgow. Oireachtas Rince Na Cruinne planned return to Dublin in 2020 for the 50 year anniversary of the championships was cancelled due to the COVID-19 pandemic. In 2022, the competition was held in Belfast.

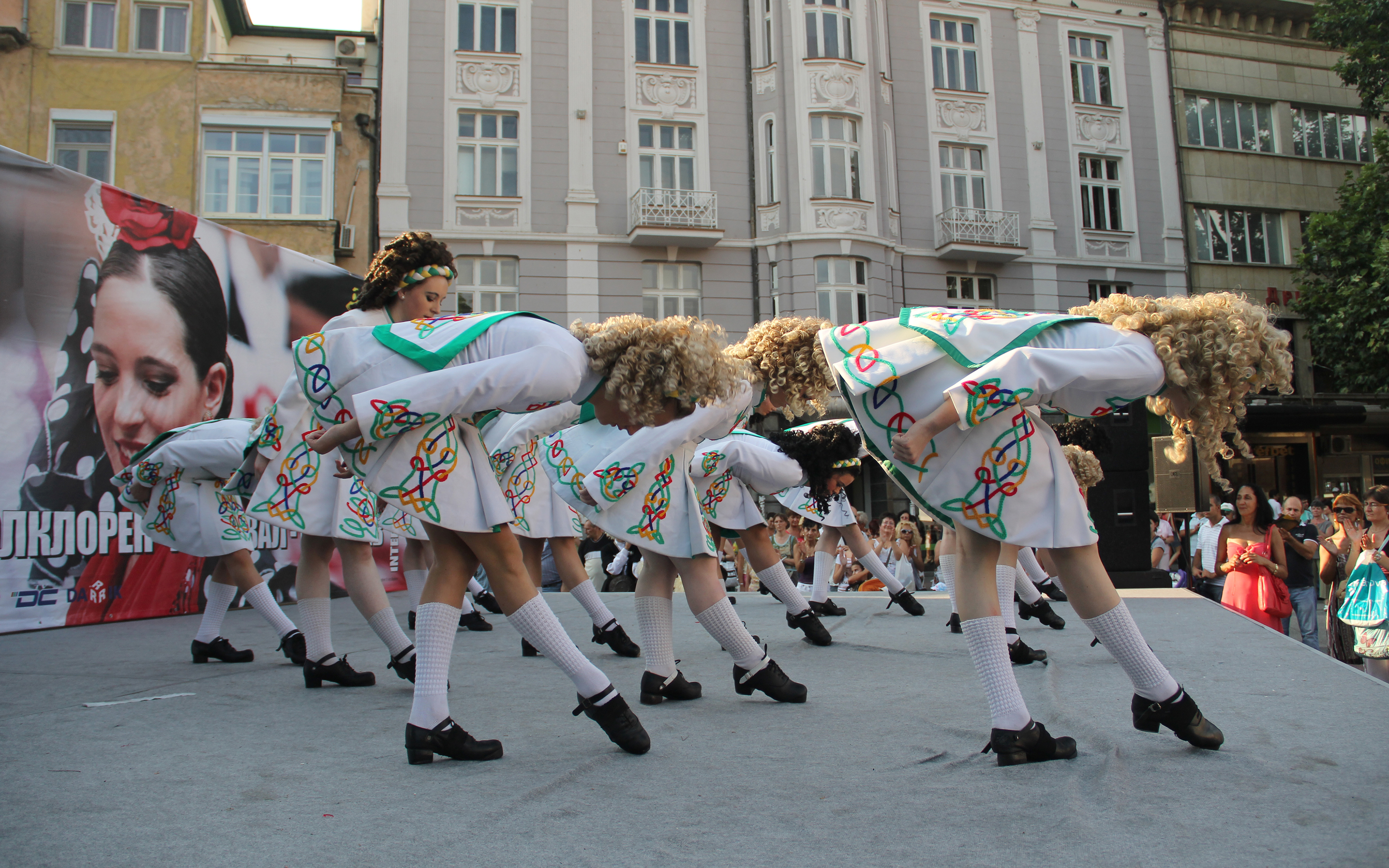
Irish dancers performing at the 18th International Folklore Festival in 2012

An Coimsiún also holds Oireachtas Rince na hÉireann, or "The All Irelands" which take place in Killarney in February of each year. It is the oldest Irish dancing competition in the world.

An Comhdhail's World championships also take place each Easter week, with the competition being held in Dublin in 2018 and Killarney in 2019. WIDA (World Irish Dance Association), which mainly consists of dancers from European countries, also hold their own World and International Championships over the Easter week, with the competition being held in Maastricht in 2018, Eindhoven in 2019, digitally in 2021 due to the COVID-19 pandemic, and in Moers in 2022.

=== Old-style step dancing ===
Old-style step dancing is a tradition related to, yet distinct from, sean-nós dancing, though it is sometimes called "Munster-style sean-nós". Old-style step dancing evolved in the 17th-18th century from the dancing of travelling Irish dance masters. The dance masters slowly formalised and transformed both solo and social dances. Modern masters of old-style step dancing style can trace the lineage of their steps directly back to 18th century dancers.

The Irish Dance masters refined and codified indigenous Irish dance traditions. Rules emerged about proper upper body, arm, and foot placement. Also, dancers were instructed to dance a step twice—first with the right foot then with the left. Old-style step dancers dance with arms loosely (but not rigidly) at their sides. They dance in a limited space. There is an emphasis on making percussive sound with the toes. The Irish dance masters of this period also choreographed particular steps to particular tunes in traditional music creating the solo traditional set dances such as the Blackbird, St. Patrick's Day, and the Job of Journey Work, which also persist in modern Irish stepdancing. In this context, "set dance" signifies a separate tradition from the social dance tradition also called set dance.

=== Festival dance ===
Following criticism of CLRG for its emphasis on certain regional forms of stepdance to the detriment of others, dance teacher Patricia Mulholland developed a new style of stepdance, beginning in the 1950s. It was described as a form of "folk ballet" which appealed to dancers of both Catholic and Protestant religious persuasions. Like other forms which share the heritage of modern stepdance but have departed from its codification, festival dance emphasises individuality and practises more relaxed style and posture.

== Sean-nós dance ==
Sean-nós, or "old style" dance is a form of Irish dancing which originated from western regions of Ireland. It has been described variously as a regional style of stepdancing, and as an entirely separate style that was virtually unknown outside small areas until the late 20th century. It is distinguished by footwork which is percussive but low to the ground in comparison to step dancing, and by its more freeform nature. Performers use a more relaxed posture, and improvise steps to fit with music. Typically, sean-nós dances are performed in small spaces, traditionally doors laid flat and table tops.

== Irish céilí dances ==
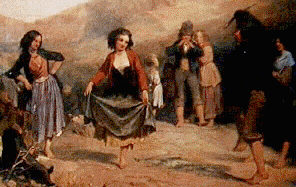
Children Dancing at the Crossroads (1835)

Irish social, or céilí (/ˈkeɪli/, Irish: [ˈceːlʲiː]) dances vary widely throughout Ireland and the rest of the world. A céilí dance may be performed with as few as two people and as many as sixteen.

Céilí dances may also be danced with an unlimited number of couples in a long line or proceeding around in a circle (such as in "The Walls of Limerick", "The Waves of Tory", "Haymakers Jig", "An Rince Mor" or "Bonfire Dance"). Céilí dances are often fast and some are quite complex ("Antrim Reel", "Morris Reel").

In a social setting, a céilí dance may be "called" – that is, the upcoming steps are announced during the dance for the benefit of newcomers. The céilí dances are typically danced to Irish instruments such as the Irish bodhrán or fiddle in addition to the concertina (and similar instruments), guitar, whistle or flute.

The term céilí dance was invented in the late 19th century by the Gaelic League. Céilí as a noun differs from the adjective céilí. A céilí is a social gathering featuring Irish music and dance. Céilí dancing is a specific type of Irish dance. Some céilithe (plural of céilí) will only have céilí dancing, some only have set dancing, and some will have a mixture.

== Irish set dancing ==
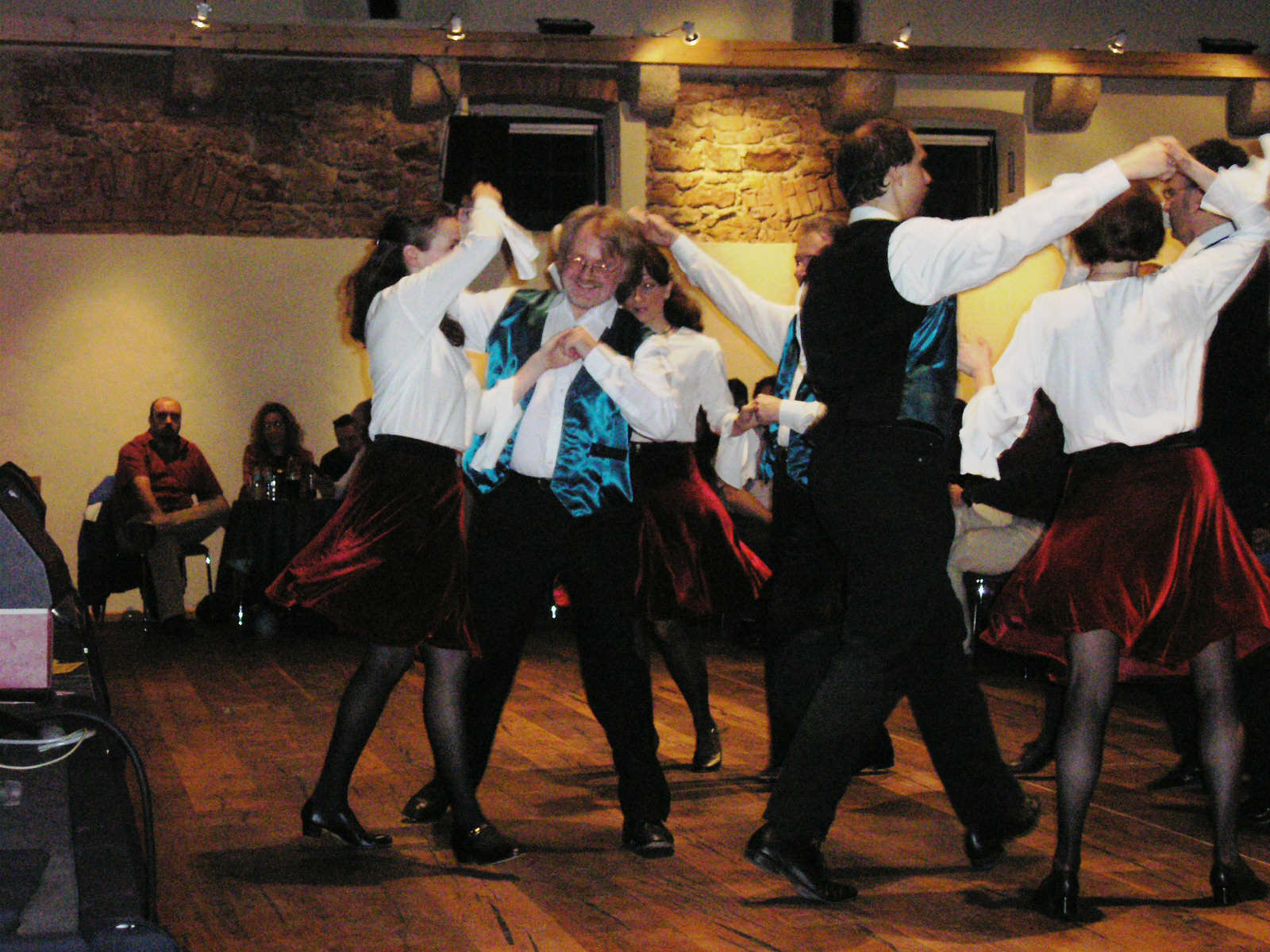
Irish Claddagh set dance

Irish set dancing (also referred to as "country set dancing") are dances similar to English country dancing and later French quadrilles; later adapting and integrating forms of the dance with the Irish sean-nós steps and Irish music. Distinguishing characteristics of Irish set dancing include that it is danced in square sets of four couples (eight people), and consist of several "figures," each of which has a number of parts, frequently repeated throughout the set. Each part of the set dance (figure) is danced to a music tempo, mostly reels, jigs, polkas and hornpipes. The sets come from various parts of Ireland and are often named for their place of origin; examples are the North Kerry Set, the Clare Set, the Corofin Plain Set, the South Galway Set and the Clare Lancers Set.

There are many solo set dances which can be performed in competition. These include both traditional sets and non-traditional sets. Some traditional sets include Blackbird (hornpipe), Job of the Journeywork (hornpipe), Garden of Daises (hornpipe), St. Patrick's Day (treble jig), King of the Fairies (hornpipe). These dances are set in their choreography, which means that no teacher can vastly change the steps.

The organisation Comhaltas Ceoltóirí Éireann promotes and hosts many set and ceili dance events.

== See also ==
- Cèilidh
- European dances

== Bibliography ==
- Brennan, Helen (1999). The Story of Irish Dancing. Mount Eagle. ISBN 0-86322-244-7.
- An Coimisiún le Rincí Gaelacha (2003). Ár Rincí Fóirne: Thirty Popular Céilí Dances. Westside.
- Cullinane, John P. (1987). Aspects of the History of Irish Dancing. Cork City: John P. Cullinane. ISBN 095279523X.
- Cullinane, John (1998). Aspects of the History of Irish Céilí Dancing. Clontarf, Dublin: The Central Remedial Clinic. ISBN 0-9527952-2-1.
- O'Keeffe, J. G.; O'Brien, Art (1902). A Handbook of Irish Dances (1st ed.). Dublin: O'Donochue. OL 7092184M.
- Ó hAllmhuráin, Gearóid (2017). A Short History of Irish Traditional Music. The O'Brien Press. ISBN 9781847179401.
- Murphy, Pat (1995). Toss the Feathers – Irish Set Dancing. Mercier. ISBN 1-85635-115-7.
- Murphy, Pat (2000). The Flowing Tide – More Irish Set Dancing. Mercier. ISBN 1-85635-308-7.
- Whelan, Frank (2000). The complete guide to Irish dance. Belfast: Appletree. ISBN 0862818052.
