= Set Dance =

A set dance is a set of dance moves and steps. It may refer specifically to:

- A kind of solo dance in Irish stepdance
- Irish set dancing, an Irish country dance in groups of eight or four dancers, derived from the French quadrille
- A kind of contra dance
