= Clogging =

Fast-footwork folk dance

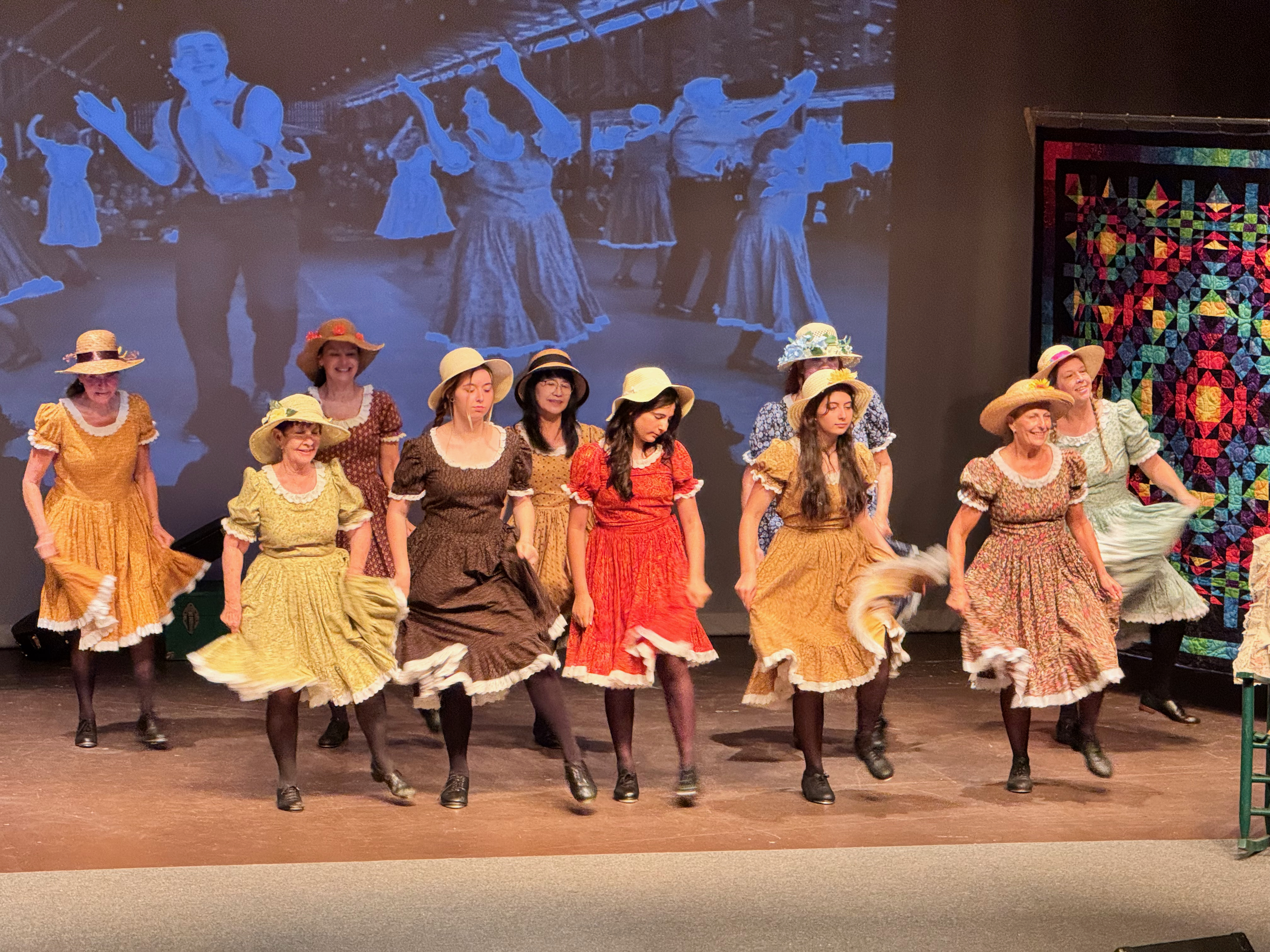
The John C. Campbell Folk School Cloggers perform at the Peacock Performing Arts Center in North Carolina.

Clogging, buck dancing, or flatfoot dancing is a type of folk dance practiced in the United States, in which the dancer's footwear is used percussively by striking the heel, the toe, or both against a floor or each other to create audible rhythms, usually to the downbeat with the heel keeping the rhythm. Clogging can be found at various old-time and bluegrass music festivals.

Clogging is the official state dance of Kentucky and North Carolina.

== Antecedents ==
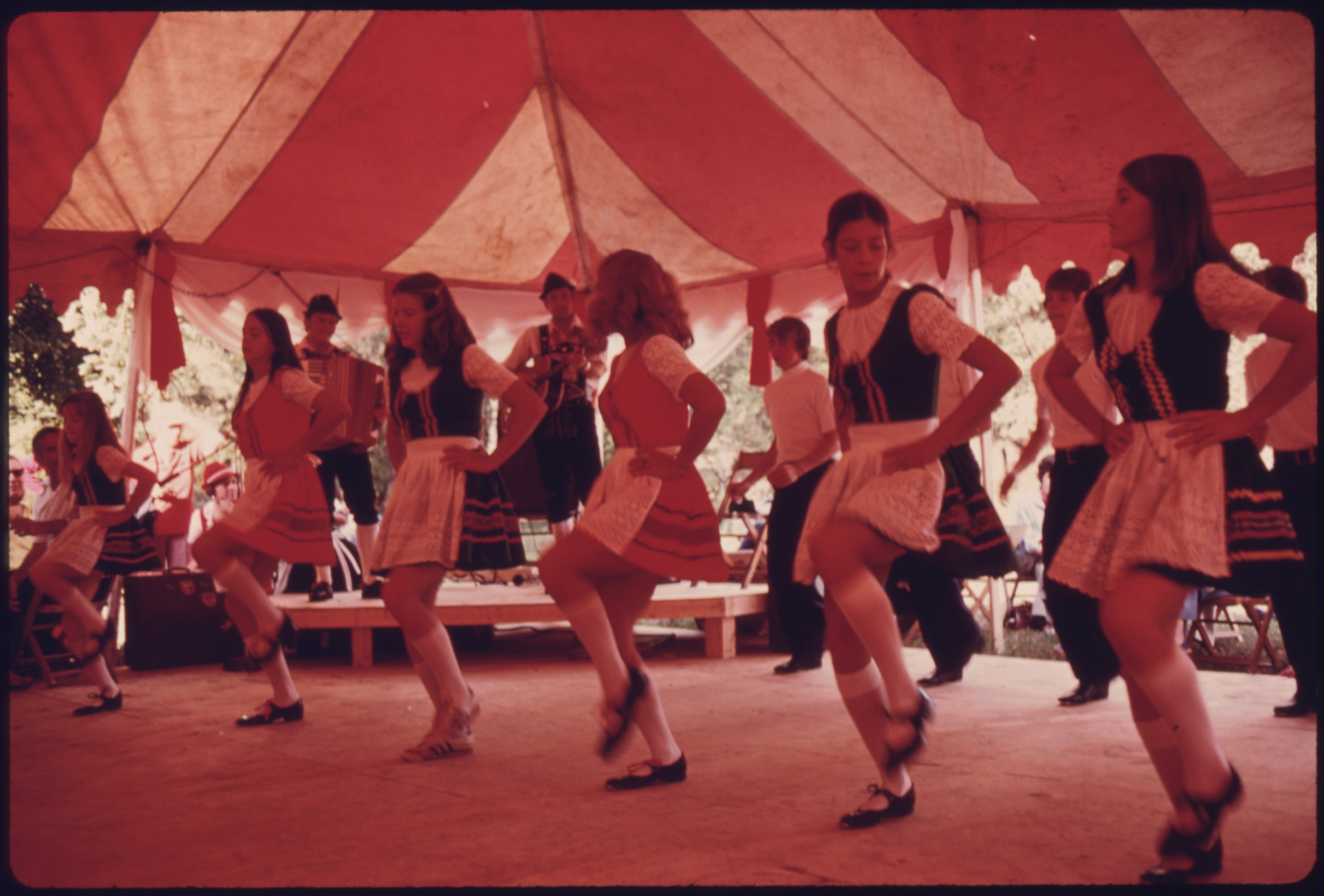
A group of "Unicoi Cloggers" from White County, Georgia perform American mountain dance routines to Bavarian polka.

In the United States, team clogging originated from square dance teams in Asheville, North Carolina's Mountain Dance and Folk Festival (1928), organized by Bascom Lamar Lunsford in cultural Appalachia.

The Soco Gap Dancers performed at the White House in 1939, which caused an uptick in the popularity of team clogging.

American clogging is associated with the predecessor to bluegrass—"old-time" music, which is based on Anglo-Celtic (English and Irish) fiddle tunes by white Appalachians as well as Affrilachian banjo tunes. Clogging primarily developed from interaction between Irish step dancing called Sean-nós dance and Black American buck dancing; there were also influences from English, Scottish, German, and Cherokee step dances. It was from clogging that tap dance eventually evolved. Now, many clogging teams compete against other teams for prizes such as money and trophies.

== Terminology ==
The term "buck", as in "buck dancing", is traceable to the West Indies and is derived from a Tupi Indian word denoting a frame or hurdle for drying and smoking meat; the original po bockarau or buccaneers were sailors who ate smoked meat and fish after the manner of the Indians. Another source states that the word bockorau can be traced to the Angolan word "buckra', and was used to refer to white people, which is disputed. However the word is known and currently used in Gullah Geechi culture of the Southeast region of the U.S. Eventually the term came to describe Irish immigrant sailors whose jig dance was known as "the buck".

One source states that buck dancing was the earliest combination of the basic shuffle and tap steps performed to syncopated rhythms in which accents are placed not on the straight beat, as with the jigs, clogs, and other dances of European origin, but on the downbeat or offbeat, a style derived primarily from the rhythms of American Black tribal music.

Yet another etymology of the word argues that it derives from the word "buck", used as a pejorative term for American Black men in the 19th century. Buck dancing was popularized in the United States by minstrel performers by European American men in blackface who would engage in American Black stereotypes in the late 19th century during their shows.

Many folk festivals and fairs utilize dancing clubs or teams to perform both buck and regular clogging for entertainment.

== See also ==
- Buckdancer's Choice
- Clog dancing
- Ira Bernstein
- Limberjack
- Sean-nós dance, including as practised in America
- Step dance
