= Les Lanciers =

Square dance

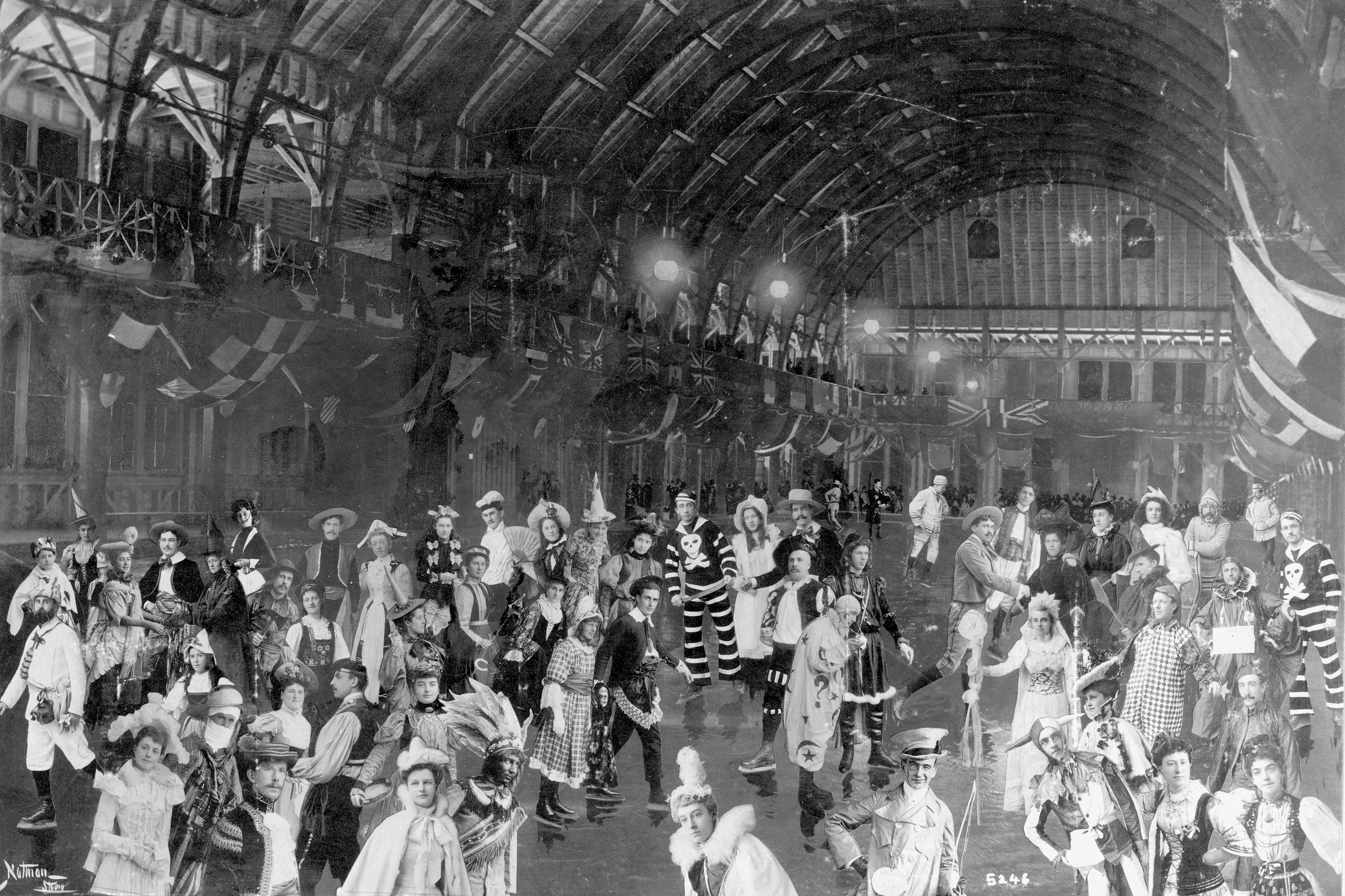
The Lancers was danced on ice at an 1899 Nova Scotia carnival.

Les Lanciers performed by Dutch child dance school

Les Lanciers or The Lancers is a square dance, a variant of the Quadrille, a set dance performed by four couples, particularly popular in the 18th and 19th centuries. It is a composite dance made up of five figures or tours, each performed four times so that each couple dances the lead part. It exists in many variants in several countries.

Widespread though it was throughout Europe, Les Lanciers became less fashionable by the beginning of the 20th century. It has survived as a popular dance in Denmark to the present day, having been introduced from England in 1860. The Danish dance took its current form before the 1st World War. From the upper class of Copenhagen it spread through dancing schools in provincial towns and through the landed gentry. It is danced at court, at many university and school gaudies, and at private functions. Les Lanciers is also taught in most of the high schools in Denmark, where it is often performed at the school's gala/prom. Normally today, the music used in Denmark is 3ème Quadrille des Lanciers by J. Mikel, a pseudonym of the French composer Joseph Meykiechel.

The five tours of the Danish dance are:

- La Dorset
- La Victoria
- Les Moulinets
- Les Visites
- Les Lanciers

The dances keep getting more advanced, no. 5 requiring very precise timing.

The Kitchen lancers was a more boisterous version of the dance that was popular in the early 20th century. Lancers sets are still danced in Irish set dance.

== See also ==
- Joseph Binns Hart, composer of music for Les Lanciers
