= Cois na hAbhna =

Concert and events venue at Ennis, Co Clare, Ireland

Coordinates: 52°51′35.46″N 8°58′56.67″W

- Interactive map of Cois na hAbhna
- Address: Gort Road, Ennis, County Clare
- Seating type: Seating
- Type: Concert Hall, Performing Arts Venue
- Events: Irish Traditional Music, Song, Dance, and Language

Construction
- Built: 1980's
- Opened: 1983
- Renovated: 2009

Website
- coisnahabhna.ie

Cois na hAbhna is a concert and events venue in Ireland, located in the town of Ennis, County Clare. It is the regional base of Comhaltas Ceoiltóirí Éireann for the Meitheal region, the primary Irish organisation dedicated to the promotion of the music, song, dance and the language of Ireland.

The venue is used for a range of events including Irish Traditional music sessions, céilí dances drama performances and other concerts. Irish dancing lessons including set dancing are also carried out at the venue.
