= Op. 199 =

In music, Op. 199 stands for Opus number 199. Compositions that are assigned this number include:

- Castelnuovo – Les Guitares bien tempérées
- Strauss – Le beau Monde
