= Dance card =

Cards used by women for dance balls

A dance card, also known as a "ball programme" or "ball book" in England, programme du bal or carnet de bal in France, and Tanzkarte in German, is used by a woman to record the names of the men with whom she intends to dance each successive dance at a formal ball.

== History ==
Dance cards appear to have originated in the 18th century, but their use first became widespread in 19th-century Vienna, especially at the large balls during Fasching before Lent. Throughout the 19th century, dance cards were used at public and private balls in most modern urban cities worldwide. The dance card acted as a record of choices and might be saved as a souvenir of the event. Émile Zola characterized dance cards as "tablets of love" in his story "Le Carnet de Danse".

In the early 20th century, dance cards were no longer used at private balls in upper class society, but were still seen at public balls and college dances. By the end of World War I, dance cards were no longer used.

== Appearance ==
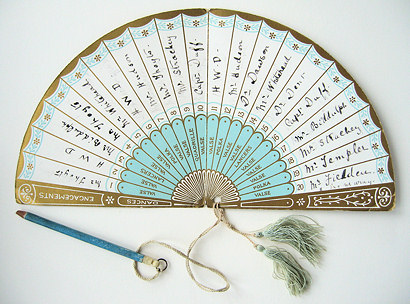
A dance engagements card in the form of a fan for 11 January 1887, showing a list of all the dances for the evening – valse (waltz), polka, lancers, and quadrille; opposite each dance is a space to record the name of the partner for that dance. After the event the card was probably kept as a souvenir of the evening

A dance card is typically a booklet with a decorative cover, listing dance titles, composers, and the person with whom the woman intended to dance. Typically, it would have a cover indicating the sponsoring organization of the ball and a decorative cord by which it could be attached to a lady's wrist or ball gown.

The elaborateness and materials of dance cards were a signifier of status. From the 19th century until World War I, dance cards for the elite of Austria-Hungary were often very elaborate, with some even incorporating precious metals and jewels.

== Modern times ==
Dance cards have become popular collectibles. In appearance, they ranged from single-use paper cards printed with the event's order of dances to elaborate jeweled and enameled silk-lined holders in which fresh paper was inserted for each event.

In modern times the expression "dance card" is often used metaphorically, as when someone says "pencil me into your dance card," meaning "find some time to spend with me". Conversely, claiming one's "dance card is full" implies that even though they may be interested, they have no time for another person.

== Pictures ==
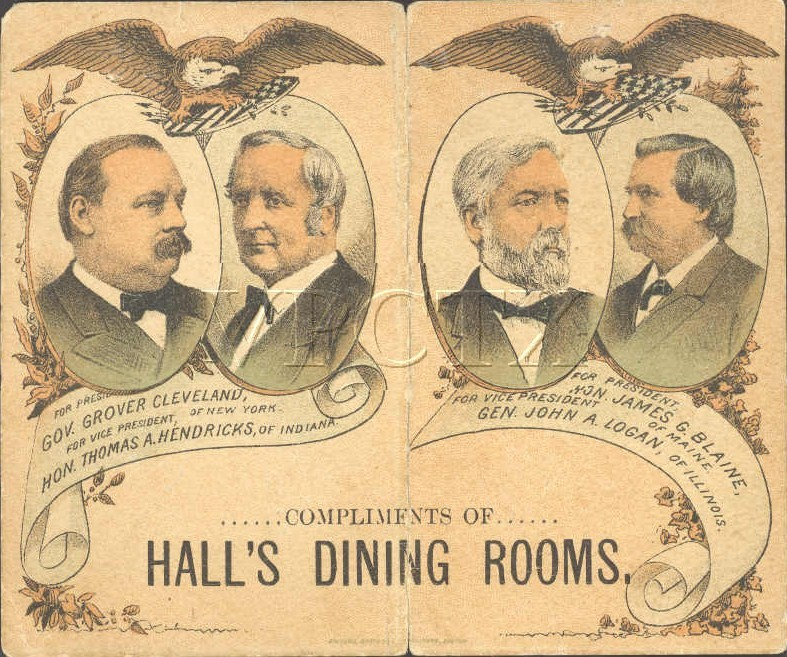
Dance card cover depicting 1884 U.S. presidential tickets

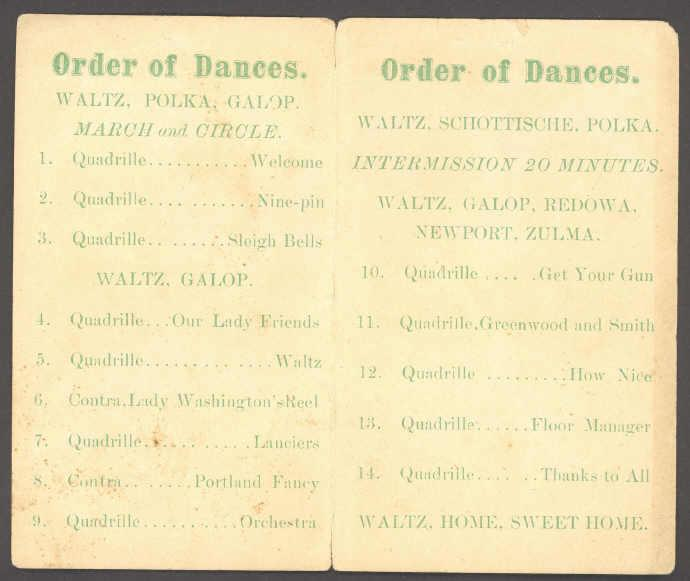
Inside of 1884 dance card

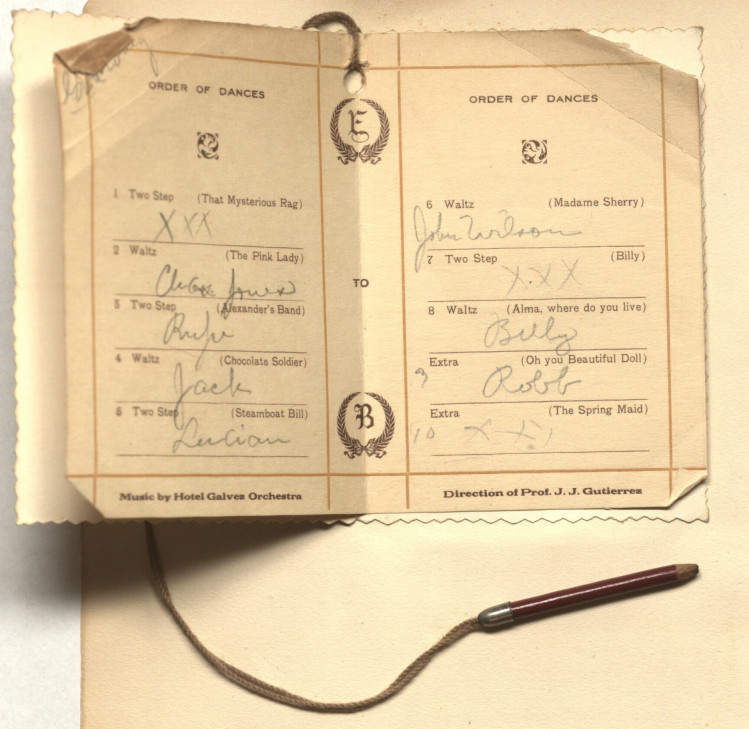
1912 Dance card of Gladys Ewing.

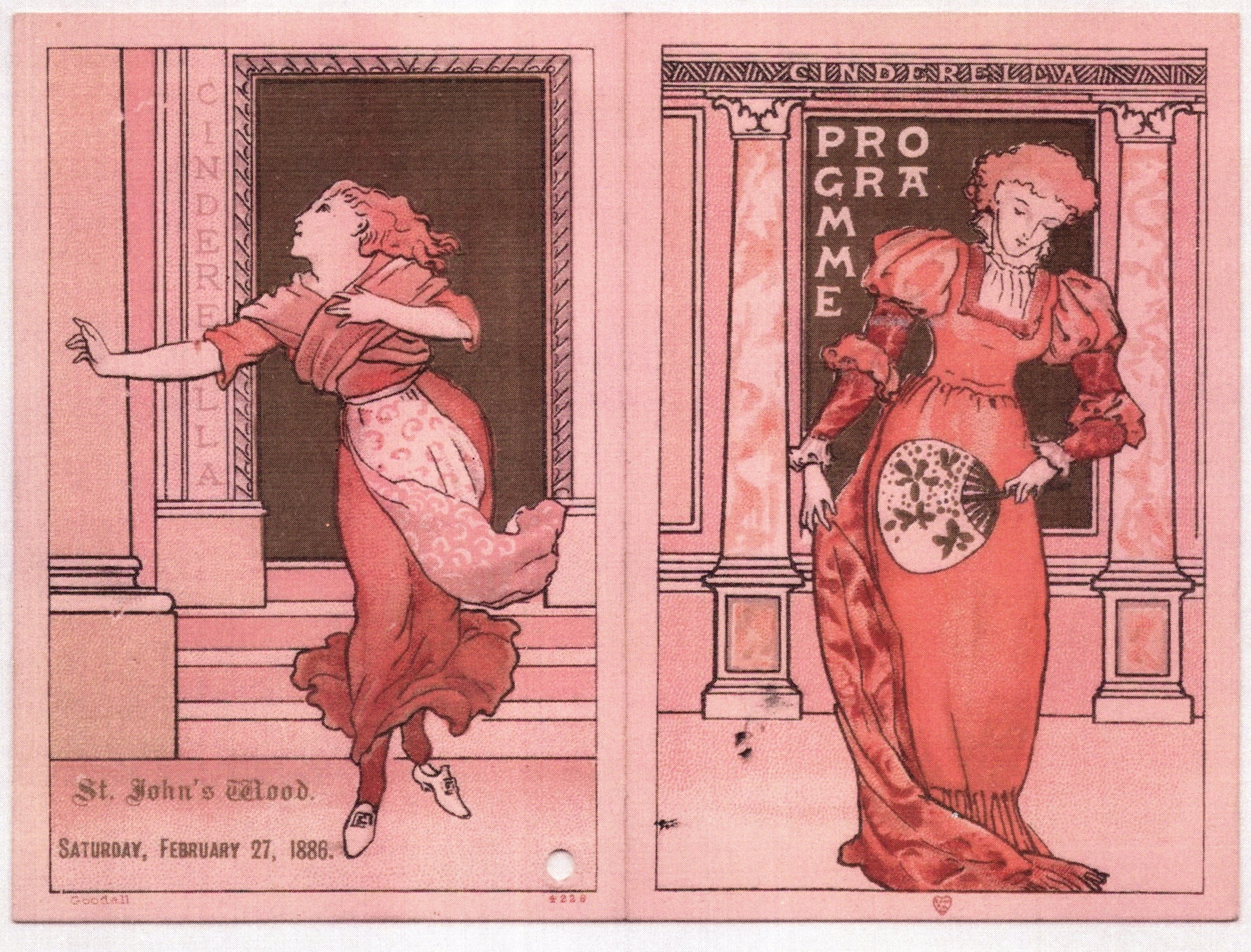
St John's Wood, Queensland (Australia) Dance Card 1886
