= Sean-nós dance in United States =

Sean-nós dance in America has its roots in Irish culture, but may be practiced differently from how it is danced in Ireland. When Irish people emigrated to America in great numbers during the early American Colonial period, or when escaping The Troubles in Ireland, they brought their dance culture with them. One of the many forms of Irish dance is sean-nós dance, which is an informal, spontaneous, solo form of dance. Sean-nós dance has both modified, and in turn been modified by, similar forms of traditional vernacular solo dance in America.

== Irish traditional dance ==
The most widely known form of traditional Irish dance is competition-oriented modern Irish stepdance. Other popular forms of Irish dancing are for couples and group social dancing, such as set dancing and céili dancing. Less known is the traditional solo dance form called "sean nós" or "old style" dance.

== Sean-nós dance ==
Sean-nós dance is characterized by its "low to the ground" footwork, free movement of the arms, improvisation, and emphasis upon a "battering step" (which sounds out the accented beat of the music). By its nature, sean-nós dance follows the music closely. Indeed, the rhythmic nature of sean-nós dance results in a percussive music of its own. It frequently is danced by only one person, and even when danced in pairs or small groups, there is no physical contact between the dancers. Because it is a freeform, solo type of dance, it is not necessary for a pre-arranged routine to be decided upon by the dancer; spontaneous expression is preferred in the tradition. It is less common to see groups performing synchronized sean-nós dance (which requires choreography in advance). Instead, the dancers may dance in turns, playing off of the energy of the other. Another more specialized form sean-nós dancing is the brush dance.

== Influence on other forms of dance in America ==
Sean-nós dance has made a significant contribution to American traditional informal freeform solo folk dancing, which includes flat foot dance (or "flat-footing"), hoofing (or "hoofin'"), buck dancing, soft shoe (casual tap dancing performed in shoes without metal taps), clogging (in its older non-show form), Irish sean-nós dance, and the Irish jig. Various other names may be applied for this category of dance, depending upon the specific regional, language, cultural, or social group involved. Solo Southern dancing and solo mountain-style dancing show strong influences from sean-nós dance.

I believe that to get some idea of the process of Southern vernacular dance development, we must consider it in parallel with its companion music and the dominant cultures that have mixed to produce it: British, African, and to some extent, Native American. These cultures began their intense musical interaction here in the 17th century, first among African-Americans and then in the 19th century among British-Americans, especially in small Southern towns and nearby rural areas. A good example of Anglo/Afro interaction in music is the introduction of the banjo, originally an African instrument. It is quite certain that the interaction between the European fiddle and African banjo changed the styles and repertoire of both. African-Americans first played these instruments together soon after being brought here, and the banjo/fiddle combination was the basis for the late 19th-century/early 20th-century mountain music to which most of our older dancers moved.

- Mike Seeger, Musician, Documentarian, Ethno-Musicologist

== Today ==
Sean-nós dance is not widely found in America today. Small sean-nós dancing communities exist in Boston, Philadelphia, Baltimore, Washington D.C., Seattle, New York, and Portland, Oregon. These communities are centered around American sean-nós dance teachers — some of Irish-American heritage — who learned their dancing in the west of Ireland. This new generation of younger American dancers now teaches and performs regularly. Kieran Jordan (Boston), Maldon Meehan (Portland, Oregon) and Shannon Dunne (Washington, DC) have produced instructional DVDs in sean-nós dance. Workshops in sean-nós dance can also be found at Irish festivals like the Sean-nós Northwest Festival, the Milwaukee Irish Fest Summer School, the Catskills Irish Arts Week, and the Minnesota Irish Fair. Sean-nós dancing workshops are also often incorporated into smaller workshop weekends focused on set dancing. Occasionally, sean-nós dancers from Ireland tour in the U.S. with well-known Irish traditional bands, such as The Chieftains and Dervish.

== Sources ==
- Folk music and dances of Ireland, Breandán Breathnach ISBN 0-85342-509-4
- Folk Music and Dances of Ireland: A Comprehensive Study Examining the Basic Elements of Irish Folk Music and Dance Traditions, Breandan Breathnach ISBN 1-900428-65-2

== See also ==
- Sean-nós dance
- Irish dance
- Irish stepdance
- Irish set dance
- Irish jig
- African American dance
