= Joseph Binns Hart =

English organist and composer

- Born: 5 June 1794
- Origin: England
- Died: 10 December 1844 (aged 50)
- Occupations: Organist, and Compiler of dance music

Joseph Binns Hart (5 June 1794 – 10 December 1844) was an English organist, and a compiler of dance music, particularly of the quadrille.

== Life ==
He was born in London on 5 June 1794. He was chorister at St Paul's Cathedral under John Sale from 1801 to 1810, and during those years took organ lessons from Samuel Wesley and Matthew Cook, piano lessons from Johann Baptist Cramer. Aged eleven Hart often deputised for Thomas Attwood, the organist of St Paul's Cathedral.

In 1810 he became organist of St Mary's Church, Walthamstow, and joined the Earl of Uxbridge's household as organist for three years. He subsequently became organist of All Hallows' Church, Tottenham.

On the introduction of the quadrille at Almack's by Lady Jersey after 1815, Hart, who was described as teacher and pianist at private balls, began his long series of adaptations of national and operatic airs to the fashionable dance measures. His most notable achievement was the compilation in 1819 of a set of Les Lanciers, a type of quadrille, which remained popular for many years.

From 1818 to 1821 Hart was chorus-master and pianist of the English Opera House (the Lyceum Theatre, London), and wrote the songs for Amateurs and Actors by Richard Brinsley Peake (1818), The Bull's Head and A Walk for a Wager (1819), The Vampyre (1820), and other musical farces and melodramas.

From 1829 until his death, Hart lived in Hastings, where he opened a music-seller's shop, conducted a small band, and played the organ at St Mary's Chapel. He died on 10 December 1844 in Hastings, aged 50.

== Publications ==
Some of Hart's most successful quadrilles were based on the music of Mozart's Don Giovanni (1818), Locke's Macbeth, Rossini's Pietro l'eremita (1822) and La donna del lago (1823), Weber's Der Freischütz 1824, and English, Irish and Scottish melodies. He composed forty-eight sets in all. He was also the author of some waltzes and galoppades. An Easy Mode of Teaching Thorough Bass and Composition is ascribed to him.
