= Hunt ball =

Event hosted by mounted fox hunting clubs

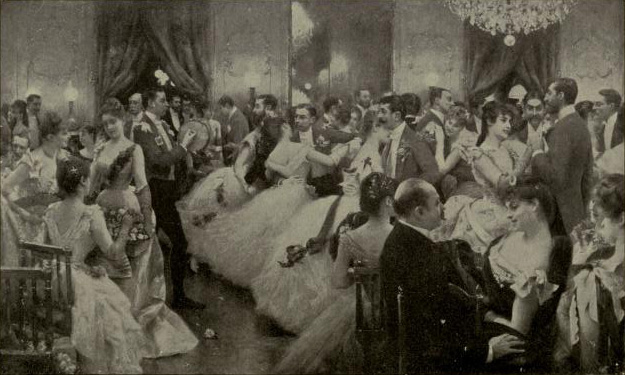
"The Hunt Ball"; by Julius LeBlanc Stewart; 1893

A hunt ball is an annual event hosted by a mounted fox hunting club, most of which are located in Britain and the United States. These balls are traditionally held around the holiday season, which is why many American Hunts mark the end of the hunting year. In the 19th century, hunt balls were not unlike other country dances. Although not as formal as the London Balls that characterized "The Season," they were still elegant by local standards.

Today, most hunt balls consist of a cocktail hour, followed by dinner and dancing. They are typically "black tie" events. Attendees are invited to wear scarlet tail coats produced specifically for hunt ball attendees. Although the dancing was once limited to traditional forms, these days styles vary widely between hunts. At some balls, the dancing is preceded by an auction in which items donated by members are sold to raise money for the care and feeding of the hounds. Ticket sales for the ball are also an important aspect of fundraising.

While hunt balls are invitational events, they are rarely exclusive. Most hunts are happy to sell additional tickets to members of the community who are interested in being part of the evening.
