= Sean-nós dance =

Traditional solo Irish percussive dance

Sean-nós dance (/ˈʃæn.noʊs/ SHAN-nohss; Irish: damhsa ar an sean nós [ˈd̪ˠəusˠə ɛɾʲ ə ˈʃan̪ˠ n̪ˠoːsˠ], lit. 'old style dancing') is an older style of traditional solo Irish dance. It is a casual dance form, as opposed to the more formal and competition-oriented form of Irish stepdance.

Sean nós in Irish means 'old style', and is applied to the dance form as well as a style of singing. These now less-common forms of Irish dance and traditional Irish singing have been documented in Irish history and by ethnomusicologists, but are still alive in parts of the Irish music scene.

== Characteristics ==
Sean-nós dance is characterised by its "low to the ground" footwork, improvised steps, free movement of the arms, and an emphasis upon a "batter" (which sounds out more loudly the accented beat of the music). Because sean-nós dancing is improvisational, it is not necessary for a pre-arranged routine or choreography to be decided upon by the dancer. Spontaneous expression is highly valued. Therefore, it is less common to see groups performing synchronised sean-nós dance (which requires choreography in advance). Instead, the dancers may dance in turns, playing off the energy of the other.

== Contrasted with stepdance ==
Sean-nós dancing is similar to, and likely influenced, the more modern, formalised and competitive Irish stepdance, although it is more freeform in its expression given it is not competitive. Stepdancing is noted for its stylised clothing, high kicks, fancy footwork, and good posture, with arms kept rigidly to the side of the body. In comparison, sean-nós dancers generally do not place emphasis on any particular costuming, wearing any clothing they happen to have on. Posture is not a key point, as with competitive dance, other than basics such as standing up relatively straight—or at least enough to execute the steps. Sean-nós dancers' arms also usually move more freely, swinging with the natural rhythm of the dance, or are kept more loosely at the side rather than rigidly. This is very similar to the Scottish-based dance of Cape Breton, Nova Scotia, in which many dancers incorporate larger arm movements in their performances. Personal style is highly valued in sean-nós.

Competitive stepdancing can be danced with a soft or a hard, percussive shoe, depending on the type of dance and situation. Sean-nós dancing is done with any available shoe that is to the liking of the individual dancer. The sound of a sean-nós dancer's footwork has its own rhythmic quality, thus many dancers prefer a shoe that is capable of percussive sound.

Traditional sean-nós dance surfaces include a standard wooden dance floor, a door that has been taken off the hinges, a table, a barrel, or even the top of a stool. In those cases, the skill of the dancer is shown by how well they can produce the various steps within the narrow bounds of the wooden surface.

The good dancer danced, as it were underneath himself, trapping each note of music on the floor, and the use of the half-door and table for solo performances indicates the limited area in which he was expected to perform. – Folk Music & Dances of Ireland, Brendan Breathnach

They used to say, 'A good dancer could dance on a silver tray, and a really excellent dancer could dance on a sixpence.' Now, any modern Irish dancer would fill the whole stage." But, why compare the two? After all, says Patrick O'Dea, they are two entirely different dances – one, a traditional "old style" of step dancing, and the second, a newer and less traditional outgrowth or variation.

== Varying styles ==
Sean-Nós Dance: This is an old style traditional form of dancing... This is a low to ground stepping out to the music, very relaxed, similar to tap dance, but it is not the stage show event like the Step Dancing you see in productions of Riverdance. Sean-nós dancing is a very impromptu, rhythmic, and low key accompaniment to a lively traditional Irish band. The footwork "battering" is great watch and listen to. These are typically done as a solo performer or in very small groups and are well suited to all ages. (oftentimes the best sean-nós dancers, are the old timers in the dark corners of the pub).

The popularization of old style dancing through competitions, stage shows and copycat teaching/learning methods has created "standard" old style steps, counter to the ideology of an improvisational, personal form of Irish dancing. Standard steps can be seen multiple times in any competition and standard tunes have emerged also, such as McCleod's reel and New Mown Meadows. Tap dancing shoes have been adopted by many prominent dancers, changing not only the sound, but also the style of the dancing.

Old style dancing may be subdivided further;

- Improvisational dancing – completely improvisational, using known movements but no predefined step sequences.
- Improvisational step dancing – a mix of improvisation and use of personal steps in an order decided on the spot.
- Step dancing – fully choreographed dance.

With the increasing popularity of competitions in old style dancing and the desire for a polished performance, many dancers opt for fully choreographed dances.

== In the Irish diaspora ==
As the Irish peoples emigrated, they took sean-nós dance with them. This form of dance has influenced various other forms of traditional solo dance extant around the world, e.g. Tap Dance or American traditional informal freeform solo folk dancing. Sean-nós dance in America may differ from how it is practiced in Ireland, because it in turn has been influenced by other cultures' dance styles there. Sean-nós dancing in America and Canada is most commonly seen at folk festivals and informal Irish music sessions, possibly mixed in with casual Irish Stepdancing and other regional styles. However, some dance workshops in America are beginning to introduce the style more widely.

== See also ==
- Sean-nós dance in United States
- Irish dance
- Irish set dancing
- Solo dance
- Step dance
- Clog dancing
- Welsh stepdance
- Klompendansen
- Stepping (African-American)
