= South Galway Set =

Form of Irish Set Dancing created in Galway, Ireland

The South Galway Set is a set dance that hails from the Gort area of Galway, Ireland. It can be viewed on Volume 2 of the video series The Magic of Irish Set Dancing with instruction by the late Connie Ryan. Other published instructions include Terry Moylan's Irish Dances, Pat Murphy's Toss the Feathers and Tom Quinn's Irish Dancing. Joe O'Hara has two online versions of this set: a 4-couple workshop version and a traditional half set version.

The following instructions for the South Galway Set dance can also be found on the Newcastle Irish Set Dancers' website along with instructions for many more Irish Set Dances. They were copied here by the author of that page, Arthur Kingsland. Instructions for the Clare Lancers Set can also be found on Wikipedia.

== Formation ==

Square Set of four couples, Gents on the left of their partners. 1st Top Couple have their backs to the band, with 2nd Top Couple opposite them. 1st Side Couple are on the left of 1st Top Couple (when facing into the set) and 2nd Side Couple are opposite them (to the right of 1st Tops). All Couples dance all parts of each figure, except where described otherwise in Figure 4 (Tops on their own followed by Sides on their own).

== Dance instructions ==
=== Figure 1: Reels (56 bars) ===
All House around	Waltz hold with Partner – House around the set	8 bars
Pass Through	Top Couples face Side Couple on your left – Pass Opposite (right shoulder to right / Ladies passing left shoulders in the middle) [2 bars] + Face Partner and change places (left shoulder to left / Lady turns anticlockwise into place / Gent turns clockwise) + Face across [2 bars] and pass Opposite (right shoulders) + Change places with Partner (left shoulders)	8 bars
Swing	Waltz hold – Swing Partner	8 bars
+ Repeat	House around + Face the same Couple – Pass through and back + Swing	24 bars

=== Figure 2: Reels (72 bars) ===
All House around	Waltz hold – House around	8 bars
Advance, Retire + Pass through	Top Couples face Side Couple on your left – Open waltz hold – Advance and retire [4 bars] + Pass Opposite (right shoulders – Ladies in the middle) + Change places with Partner (left shoulders) [4 bars] + Repeat back to place (Advance and retire + Pass through)	16 bars
Swing	Waltz hold – Swing Partner	8 bars
+ Repeat	House around + Face the same Couple – Advance and retire + Pass through + Advance and retire + Pass back + Swing	32 bars

=== Figure 3: Reels (88 bars) ===
All House around	House around	8 bars
Advance, Retire + House Across	Waltz hold – Advance to the centre and retire + House around halfway to Opposite place + Advance and retire + House around to home position	16 bars
House Around	House Around	8 bars
Swing	Waltz hold – Swing Partner	8 bars
+ Repeat	House around + Advance to the centre and retire + House halfway + Advance and retire + House to home + House around + Swing	40 bars

=== Figure 4: Jigs (88 bars) ===
Using Up jig steps...

All House around	House around	8 bars
Tops House	Top Couples – House around each other	8 bars
All Advance, Retire + House + Swing	All Couples in waltz hold – Advance and retire twice (forward 1−2−123 back 1−2−123) + House around + Swing	24 bars
All House around	House around	8 bars
Sides House	Side Couples – House around each other	8 bars
All Advance, Retire + House + Swing	Advance and retire twice + House around + Swing	24 bars

=== Figure 5: Reels (72 bars) ===
All House around	House around	8 bars
Advance, Retire + Ladies cross + House	Top Couples face Side Couple on your left – Open waltz hold – Advance and retire + Ladies change places passing right shoulder to right while Gents turn once in place clockwise (pulling right shoulder back) + House around with new Partner	16 bars
Advance, Retire + Ladies cross + House	Advance and retire + Ladies change places while Gents turn clockwise in place + House around with original Partner	16 bars
Swing + House	Swing + House around with Partner	16 bars
+ Repeat	Advance and retire + Ladies cross + House around with new Partner + Advance and retire + Ladies cross + House around with original Partner	32 bars
Big Christmas	All form a basket – Place left arm over the right of the person next to you and grasp the wrist of the next person with your left, Place right foot into the middle and circle left	8 bars

== Steps ==
All Advance and Retire movements, for both the jigs and the reels, are danced Forward 1-2-123 Back 1-2-123.

For Ladies starting on the right foot (t = toe): R L Rt-Lt-Rt / L R Lt-Rt-Lt
For Gents starting on the left foot: L R Lt-Rt-Lt / R L Rt-Lt-Rt

Joe O'Hara notes that the set is danced quite flat, with some lift to the step – though not as much as in the Clare style – and little or no battering. The jig is danced with the rising (or up) jig step.

== Web versions of this set ==
- Joe O'Hara's website
- 4-couple workshop version of the South Galway Set
- South Galway Set on Newcastle Irish Set Dancers' website
- South Galway on DanceMinder
