= Treble reel =

Dance

The Treble reel is a dance done in hard shoes to a reel (4/4) timing. Treble reels are more to be found in the show dancing world rather than in the competition world. Dance schools who organize competitions ("feiseanna" <fesh-ah-na>) can decide whether to have a treble reel competition or not. Usually they occur under a Special Trophy competition.
