= Le beau monde =

"Le beau monde" (Fashionable Society), Op. 199, is a quadrille composed by Johann Strauss II in 1857, while Strauss was conducting a tour of Russia with his orchestra. The work exudes the authentic musical flavour of Russia, and the Saint Petersburg edition of the work describes the composition as a Quadrille sur des airs Russes (Quadrilles on Russian Airs). The title of the quadrille reflects the fashion then in Russia for the French language.
