= Irish set dancing =

Type of Irish folk dancing

Irish set dancing, sometimes called "Irish sets", is a popular form of folk dancing in Ireland danced to Irish tunes in groups of eight or four dancers. It is also sometimes named set dance, but this name refers more often to a kind of dance in Irish stepdance.

== History ==
Set dancing is based on quadrilles, which were court dances. These were transformed by the Irish into a unique folk dance of the Irish rural communities.

When the Gaelic League was formed in 1897, it sought to discourage set dancing, because it was perceived as being of foreign origins, and consequently at odds with the League's nationalist agenda. In its place, the League promoted ceili dance, a process which continued during the 1930s and 1940s with the support of the Catholic Church in the form of the Public Dance Halls Act 1935. The rise of rock and roll in the 1950s caused the popularity of set dancing to fade. However, in the 1980s a revival started and many sets that have not been done for forty years or more are being recovered and danced again.

As the sets were often shown in special competitions under a choregraphied form (three or four figures had to be chosen to dance on the stage for instance), the popular version of the sets danced in the Céilí is often derived from this choreography and can be different from the original. For instance, the Connemara Reel Set was danced at first with only a reel figure and a jig figure. To be shown in competition it had to be truncated in more figures and now this is this version with three reel figures and a jig figure which is danced in the céilithe.

== The Set ==
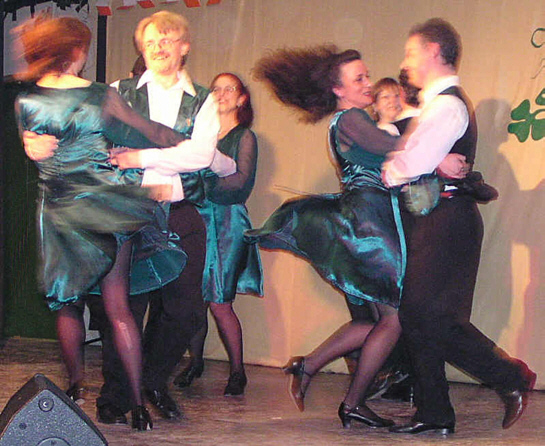
Shramore Set, 2nd Figure, swing with Céilí-hold

To start, four couples are arranged in the form of a square to dance with each couple being in the middle of the sides of the square. Both the eight dancers in the group and the dance itself are called a "set". The dance is a sequence of several dance figures, which usually have a common theme or structure. The figures usually begin and end with repeated parts that everyone dances, and then during the figure each couple or pair of couples will dance separately. In the set, the couple with their backs to the band are traditionally named "First Tops" with "Second Tops" facing them. The couple on First Tops left hand side is called "First Sides" with "Second Sides" facing. Usually the First Tops are the first to dance, with some sets having First Sides and then Second Tops going next and some having Second Tops and then the First Sides. Second Sides is almost always the last couple to dance, and is therefore a good place for beginners to start, as they get more time to watch the demonstrations of the figure that the other couples give.

Sets from a particular region usually have similar elements. For instance, sets from the Connemara region (such as the Connemara Reel Set, the South Galway Reel Set and the Claddagh Set) have the First Sides on the right of the First Tops, and sets from the Clare region often involve footwork similar to Irish traditional Stepdance or traditional freeform Sean-nós dance (which emphasizes a "battering" step).

Distinctive sets and dance regions emerged in the course of the 19th century and evolved as popular house dances separate from the more formal Irish step-dancing tradition. In some homesteads a kitchen pot was placed under the flag stones as an extra acoustical element for the house dance.

Sets differs from square dance and round dance in that it does not require a caller: the sequence of figures is predefined by the name of the set. In places with a large community of set dancers, like Ireland or New York City, it is usual for dances to be uncalled - that is, done with no calling - because most dancers already know the instructions for the common sets. However, at venues with larger numbers of occasional dancers, or for an unaccustomed or new set, a caller is often present to give instructions as the dance progresses, for those people who are not yet familiar with the set.

== See also ==
- List of Irish Set Dancing Champions
- The South Galway Set
- The Clare Lancers Set
- Irish dance
- Irish stepdance
- Sean-nós dance
- Sean-nós dance in America
- Slide (tune type)
- Polka
