= Quadrille =

Dance

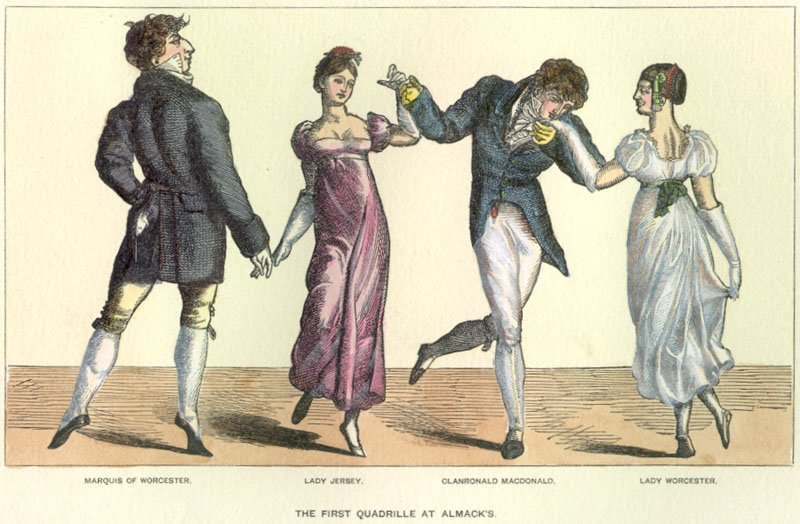
Lady Jersey introduces the quadrille to England

The quadrille is a dance that was fashionable in late 18th- and 19th-century Europe and its colonies. The quadrille consists of a chain of four to six contredanses. Latterly the quadrille was frequently danced to a medley of opera melodies.

Performed by four couples in a rectangular formation, it is related to American square dancing. The quadrille also gave rise to Cape Breton Square Dancing via American square dancing in New England. The Lancers, a variant of the quadrille, became popular in the late 19th century and was still danced in the 20th century in folk-dance clubs. A derivative found in the Francophone Lesser Antilles is known as kwadril, and in Jamaica, quadrille is a traditional folk dance which is done in two styles i.e. ballroom and campstyle. The dance is also still found in Madagascar as well as old Caribbean culture.

== History ==
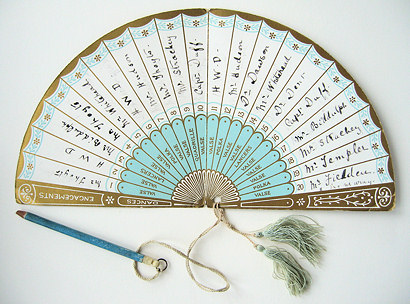
Dance engagements card for 11 January 1887, published by M W & Co Ltd (Marcus Ward & Co) 184 × 95mm (7¼ × 3¾in) (inside this dance engagements card is a list of all the dances for the evening – valse, polka, lancers and quadrille; opposite each dance is a space to record the name of the partner for that dance).

The term quadrille originated in 17th-century military parades in which four mounted horsemen executed square formations. The word probably derived from the Italian quadriglia (diminutive of quadra, hence a small square).

The dance was introduced in France around 1760: originally it was a form of cotillion in which only two couples were used, but two more couples were eventually added to form the sides of a square. The couples in each corner of the square took turns, in performing the dance, where one couple danced, and the other couples rested. The "quadrille des contredanses" was now a lively dance with four couples, arranged in the shape of a square, each couple facing the center. One pair was called the "head" couple, the adjacent pairs the "side" couples. A dance figure was often performed first by the head couple and then repeated by the side couples. Terms used in the dance are mostly the same as those in ballet, such as jeté, chassé, croisé, plié and arabesque.

Reaching English high society in 1816 through Lady Jersey, the quadrille became a craze. As it became ever more popular in the 19th century it evolved into forms that used elements of the waltz, including The Caledonians and The Lancers. In Germany and Austria dance composers (Josef Lanner and the Strauss family) composed for the quadrille. Its popularity made it a metaphor, the "stately quadrille", of the constant formation of fresh political alliances with different partners in order to maintain the balance of power in Europe. Lewis Carroll lampooned the dance in "The Lobster Quadrille," part of his 1865 novel Alice's Adventures in Wonderland.

Though new music was composed, the names of the five parts (or figures) remained the same, as did the steps and the figures themselves. The parts were called:

1. Le Pantalon ("Trousers")
2. L'été ("Summer")
3. La Poule (The Hen")
4. La Pastourelle ("The Shepherd Girl")
5. Finale

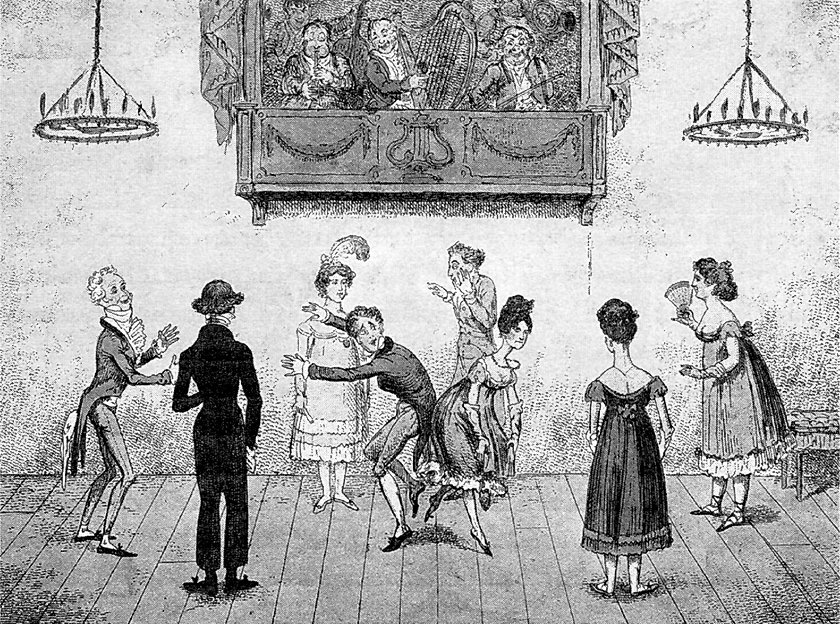
"Accidents in Quadrille Dancing", 1817 caricature

All the parts were popular dances and songs from that time (19th century): Le Pantalon was a popular song, the second and third part were popular dances, La Pastourelle was a well-known ballad by the cornet player Collinet. The finale was very lively.

Sometimes La Pastourelle was replaced by another figure; La Trénis. This was a figure made by the dance master Trenitz. In the Viennese version of the quadrille both figures were used: La Trénis became the fourth part, and La Pastourelle the fifth, making a total of six parts.

Notable quadrilles include among others the following: Le beau monde, Le piège de Méduse and Le prophète (the quadrille from the latter was also included in the arrangement Les Patineurs).

== The quadrille – musical analysis ==
Quadrille (sample)

Thus the quadrille was a very intricate dance. The standard form contained five different parts, and the Viennese lengthened it to six different parts. The following table shows what the different parts look like, musically speaking:

- part 1: Pantalon (written in 2/4 or 6/8)
  theme A – theme B – theme A – theme C – theme A
- part 2: Été (always written in 2/4)
  theme A – theme B – theme B – theme A
- part 3: Poule (always written in 6/8)
  theme A – theme B – theme A – theme C – theme A – theme B – theme A
  - Part 3 always begins with a two-measure introduction
- part 4: Trénis (always written in 2/4)
  theme A – theme B – theme B – theme A
- part 5: Pastourelle (always written in 2/4)
  theme A – theme B – theme C – theme B – theme A
- part 6: Finale (always written in 2/4)
  theme A – theme A – theme B – theme B – theme A – theme A
  - Part 6 always begins with a two-measure introduction

All the themes are 8 measures long.

== See also ==
- Joseph Binns Hart, composer of quadrilles

Historically related forms of dance

- Contra dance
- Square dance
- English country dance
- Irish set dance
