= Clare Lancers Set =

Irish dance

The Clare Lancers Set is one of the most popular dances in the Irish Set Dancing repertoire. As the name suggests it hails from the Clare area on the mid-west coast of the Republic of Ireland. Other published instructions for this dance include Larry Lynch's Set Dances of Ireland, Terry Moylan's Irish Dances, Pat Murphy's Toss the Feathers and Tom Quinn's Irish Dancing. Joe O'Hara and the Newcastle Irish Set Dancers have versions this set online.

== Formation ==

Square Set of four couples, Gents on the left of their partners. 1st Top Couple have their backs to the band, with 2nd Top Couple opposite them. 1st Side Couple are on the left of 1st Top Couple (when facing into the set) and 2nd Side Couple are opposite them (to the right of 1st Tops).

== Steps ==
Traditionally the figures are danced with smooth flowing steps pushing flat along the floor and minimal heel lift.

== Dance Instructions ==
=== Figure 1: Reels 160 bars ===
| All Couples | Lower Promenade hold - Lead around + Turn the Lady under [8 bars] + Waltz hold - Swing [8 bars] | 16 bars |
| 1st Top Gent + Opposite Lady | Pass left shoulder to left in the centre [2 bars] + Turn clockwise [2 bars] + Swing [4 bars] + Finish with back to own position | 8 bars |
| Top Couples | Square - Pass Opposite (right shoulder to right) + Change places with Partner (left shoulder to left) + Pass back (right shoulders) + Change places with Partner (left shoulders) + Finish in own position facing Corner | 8 bars |
| All with Corners | Swing Corner + Finish facing Partner | 8 bars |
| All Couples | Dance back to Partner [2 bars] + Swing Partner | 8 bars |
| 1st Top Lady + Opposite Gent | Pass left shoulder to left + Turn clockwise + Swing | 8 bars |
| Top Couples | Square | 8 bars |
| All Couples | Swing Corner + Dance back to Partner + Swing Partner | 16 bars |
| 1st Side Gent + Opposite Lady | Pass left shoulder to left + Turn clockwise + Swing | 8 bars |
| Side Couples | Square | 8 bars |
| All Couples | Swing Corner + Dance back to Partner + Swing Partner | 16 bars |
| 1st Side Lady + Opposite Gent | Pass left shoulder to left + Turn clockwise + Swing | 8 bars |
| Side Couples | Square | 8 bars |
| All Couples | Swing Corner + Dance back to Partner + Swing Partner | 16 bars |
| All Couples | House the set doubling the last 2 bars | 8 bars |

=== Figure 2: Reels 192 bars ===
| All Couples | Lower Promenade hold - Lead around + Turn the Lady under + Swing | 16 bars |
| 1st Top Couple | House inside [8 bars] + Right hand in right - Lady turns under 4 times while Gent dances on the spot | 16 bars |
| 1st Top Couple | Face each other - Pass right shoulders cross to opposite side + Turn clockwise + Pass Partner and cross with both Top Couples splitting to form Side Lines | 8 bars |
| All Couples | Advance and retire + Advance and Side Couples retire while Top Couples dance in place | 8 bars |
| All Couples | Swing | 8 bars |
| 2nd Top Couple | House inside + Turn Lady under 4 times + Cross to opposite + Turn and cross - Top Couple split to form Side Lines | 24 bars |
| All Couples | Advance and retire + Advance and Side Couples retire while Top Couples dance in place | 8 bars |
| All Couples | Swing | 8 bars |
| 1st Side Couple | House inside + Turn Lady under 4 times + Cross to opposite + Turn and cross - Top Couple split to form Side Lines | 24 bars |
| All Couples | Advance and retire + Advance and Side Couples retire while Top Couples dance in place | 8 bars |
| All Couples | Swing | 8 bars |
| 2nd Side Couple | House inside + Turn Lady under 4 times + Cross to opposite + Turn and cross - Top Couple split to form Side Lines | 24 bars |
| All Couples | Advance and retire + Advance and Side Couples retire while Top Couples dance in place | 8 bars |
| All Couples | Swing + House the set doubling the last 2 bars | 16 bars |

=== Figure 3: Reels 144 bars ===
All Couples
Lower Promenade hold - Lead around + Turn the Lady under + Swing
16 bars
All Ladies
Advance and retire twice
8 bars
All Gents
Advance and retire twice
8 bars
All Couples
Gents form Left hand star in the centre and place right hand around Partner's waist - Wheel around + Belly to belly turn with Partner
8 bars
All Couples
Gents form right hand star with left hand around Partner's waist - Wheel around + Belly to belly turn with Partner to face into set
8 bars
All Couples
Big Christmas left for 8 bars + Jump to place left foot in on first beat of the next 8 bars + Big Christmas right
16 bars
All Couples
Swing Partner
8 bars
All Ladies
Advance and retire twice
8 bars
All Gents
Advance and retire twice
8 bars
All Couples
Gents form Left hand star and open ballroom hold with Partner - Wheel around + Belly to belly turn + Right hands across to Wheel back to place
16 bars
All Couples
Big Christmas left + Jump to change supporting foot + Big Christmas right
16 bars
All Couples
Swing + House the set doubling the last

2 bars

16 bars

=== Figure 4: Reels 192 bars ===
| All Couples | Lower Promenade hold - Lead around + Turn the Lady under + Swing | 16 bars |
| 1st Top Couple | House inside | 8 bars |
| Top Couples | Lead around clockwise (left first) through own position to meet the Couple on the left a second time | 8 bars |
| All Couples | Tops with the Side Couple on their left - Right hand star + Left hand star | 8 bars |
| All Couples | Remaining in groups of 4 - Little Christmas left [8 bars] + Break and Swing Partner back to place [8 bars] | 16 bars |
| 2nd Top Couple | House inside | 8 bars |
| Top Couples | Lead around anticlockwise (right first) once + Meet Side Couple on the right | 8 bars |
| All Couples | Tops with the Side Couple on their right - Right hand star + Left hand star + Little Christmas left + Swing Partner back to place | 24 bars |
| 1st Side Couple | House inside | 8 bars |
| Side Couples | Lead around anticlockwise (left first) once + Meet Side Couple on the left | 8 bars |
| All Couples | Sides with the Top Couple on their left - Right hand star + Left hand star + Little Christmas left + Swing Partner back to place | 24 bars |
| 2nd Side Couple | House inside | 8 bars |
| Side Couples | Lead around anticlockwise (right first) once + Meet Side Couple on the right | 8 bars |
| All Couples | Tops with the Side Couple on their right - Right hand star + Left hand star + Little Christmas left + Swing Partner back to place + House the set | 32 bars |

=== Figure 5: Reels 192 bars ===
In this dance at the end of the Chain the Couples line up forming a Column of 8 dancers with each Lady in front of her Partner in the following order: 1st the Dancing Couple / 2nd the Couple on their left / 3rd the Couple on their right / 4th the Couple opposite - All facing out from the Dancing Couples place.

| All Couples | Lower Promenade hold - Lead around + Turn the Lady under + Swing | 16 bars |
| All Couples (1st Tops) | Face Partner - Chain all round Ladies to the left / Gents to the right + Swing Partner one turn in Opposite position + Chain back to place and form Column facing out from 1st Top's position (1st Top Lady, 1st Top Gent, 1st Side Lady, 1st Side Gent, 2nd Side Lady, etc. with 2nd Top Gent last) | 16 bars |
| All Couples | Ladies slip right / Gents slip left [4 bars] + Slip back passing Partner to form Ladies (on the left) and Gents lines facing across the set | 8 bars |
| Lines of four | Joining hands along the lines (and with the next set if possible) - Advance and retire twice | 8 bars |
| All Couples | Dance back and face Partner [4 bars] + Swing [4 bars] | 8 bars |
| All Couples (2nd Tops) | Chain around halfway + Swing Partner once + Chain back + Form Column (2nd Top, 2nd Side, 1st Side, 1st Top) | 16 bars |
| All Couples | Ladies slip right / Gents slip left + Slip back passing Partner to form Ladies and Gents lines | 8 bars |
| Lines of four | Advance and retire twice | 8 bars |
| All Couples | Dance back and face Partner + Swing | 8 bars |
| All Couples (1st Sides) | Chain around halfway + Swing Partner once + Chain back + Form Column (1st Sides, 2nd Tops, 1st Tops, 2nd Sides) | 16 bars |
| All Couples | Ladies slip right / Gents slip left + Slip back passing Partner to form Ladies and Gents lines | 8 bars |
| Lines of four | Advance and retire twice | 8 bars |
| All Couples | Dance back and face Partner + Swing | 8 bars |
| All Couples (2nd Sides) | Chain around halfway + Swing Partner once + Chain back + Form Column (2nd Sides, 1st Tops, 2nd Tops, 1st Sides) | 16 bars |
| All Couples | Ladies slip right / Gents slip left + Slip back passing Partner to form Ladies and Gents lines | 8 bars |
| Lines of four | Advance and retire twice | 8 bars |
| All Couples | Dance back and face Partner + Swing + House the set | 16 bars |

== Notes ==
Big Christmas (Basket):

- Place your Right arm around the waist of the person on your right at the level of the small of the back.
- Place your Left hand over the right arm of the person on your left clasping the right wrist of the next person.
- To Basket left put your right foot in the centre with the knee bent slightly. In effect you will hop on this foot pushing with the other foot placed behind.
- To Basket right reverse the feet.

== Web versions of this set ==
- Joe O'Hara's Irish Set Dancing website
- Arthur Kingsland's Newcastle Irish Set Dancers website
- Additional notes and video links for Clare Lancers on DanceMinder
