= Alzheimer's disease in the media =

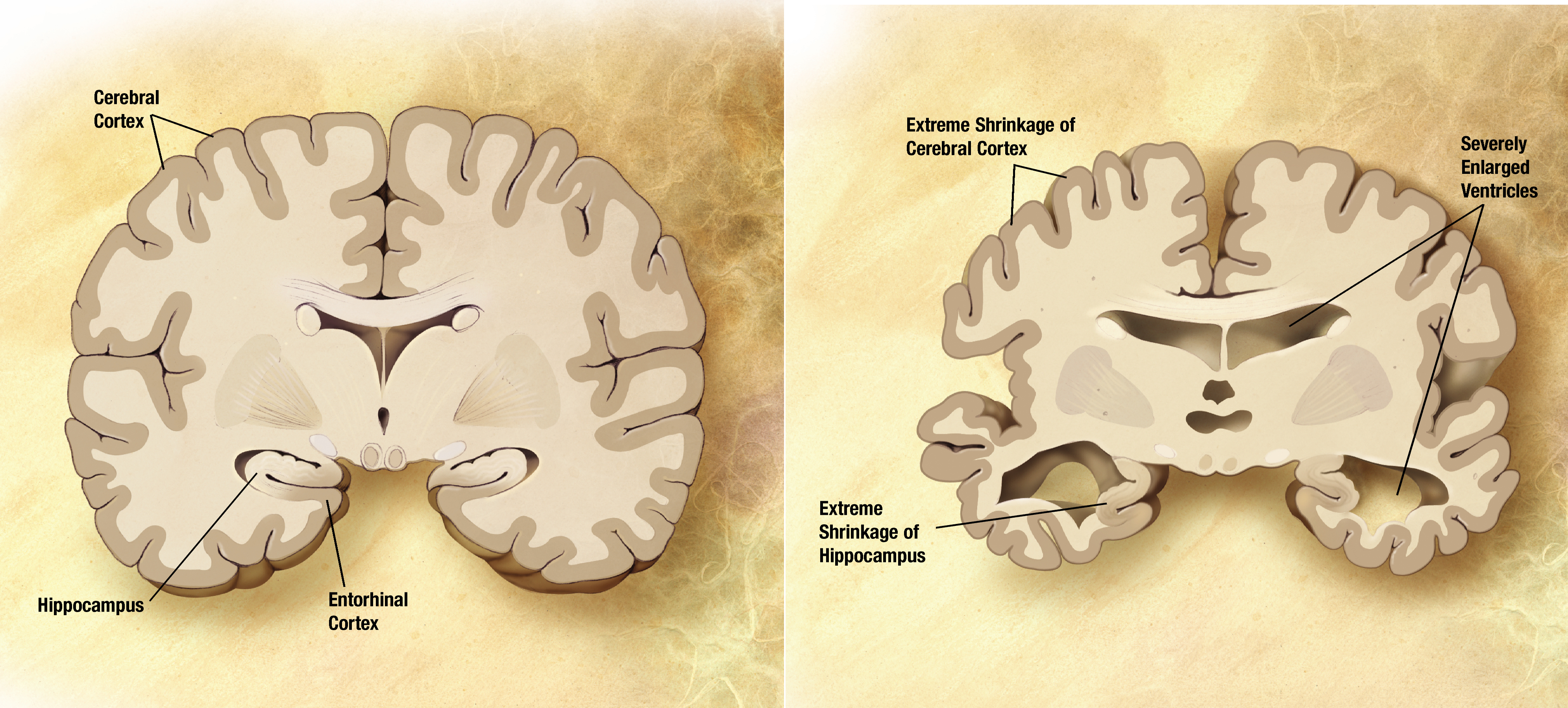
Diagram of a normal brain compared to the brain of a person with Alzheimer's

This article provides a list of media documents portraying Alzheimer's disease as a critical feature of the main plot:

== 1949 ==
- Death of a Salesman; while not mentioned in the script by name, Willy Loman exhibits many notable signs of the disease.

== 1981 ==
- Chillysmith Farm documents the aging and death of a grandfather in the bosom of his family, so that he could live and die among the people he loved.

== 1986 ==
- Sonia by Paule Baillargeon
- "I Forget" by SNFU from If You Swear, You'll Catch No Fish

== 1987 ==
- An Alzheimer's Story This documentary provides the rare opportunity of following a family with an Alzheimer's victim for two years
- The More We Get Together The More We Get Together gives insights into working with very old, disoriented, nursing home residents (Demented).
- No Place Like Home: Long Term Care For the Elderly Providing home care rather than institutionalized care is often less costly to the public and more desirable for the older person (including frail and demented).

== 1988 ==
- Aging in Soviet Georgia: A Toast to Sweet Old Age, an in-depth look at the culture and experience of normal aging in the area of the world often called an "epicenter of longevity".

== 1990 ==
- Can't Afford to Grow Old, the reality of aging is that there is no help in paying for a nurse or a housekeeper if you become disabled and need assistance

== 1991 ==
- Grace is a documentary that profiles the life of Grace Kirkland, beginning shortly after her diagnosis of Alzheimer's disease and ending at her death seven years later. The documentary tracks Grace through the progression of her symptoms and the changing role of her caregiver husband, Glenn Kirkland. This Whiteford-Hadary production was aired on American public television stations in 1991 and has received a regional Emmy Award.

== 1992 ==
- Communicating With The "Alzheimer-Type" Population The two vignettes depicted in this video show typical examples of troublesome behavior in very old people who are disoriented

== 1993 ==
- Black Daisies for The Bride: A filmed play written by the poet Tony Harrison, based on the lives and experiences of people with Alzheimer's living in High Royds Hospital, Yorkshire. The play uses a combination of drama, documentary and music. The patients, their families and the staff play themselves, with the exception of a few professional actors.

== 1994 ==
- Complaints of a Dutiful Daughter by Deborah Hoffmann

== 1995 ==
- Alzheimer's Disease: Inside Looking Out by Terra Nova

== 1996 ==
- Forget Me Never When Diana McGowin got hopelessly lost driving home, she knew something was terribly wrong. Because she was only fifty-two, the doctors did not suspect Alzheimer's . After three years of tests they concluded she had a rare form called "early onset" which can strike victims as early as their thirties.

== 1997 ==
- ABC News Primetime Alzheimer's Dogs Meet Crystal, a dog who has the job of keeping tabs on her owner who has Alzheimer's disease. Crystal was trained by a volunteer group called Okada in 1986 to provide hearing guide dogs for the deaf but has added Alzheimer's dogs as her latest project. Airdate: April 9, 1997.

== 1998 ==
- The Safe House, portrays an aging spy having difficulties convincing people his information is not paranoia associated with Alzheimer's.

== 1999 ==
- Forget Me Never Canadian-American film produced in 1999
- The Caregiver, a book by Aaron Alterra about an elderly man detailing the progression of his wife's Alzheimer's, how he cared for her and the effect it had on his life. John Bayley, the husband of Iris Murdoch, who died of the disease in 1999, wrote of this book that it was "the best and most expert book on Alzheimer's that I have read and it should be closely studied by every caregiver."
- Malcolm and Barbara: Love's Farewell

== 2000 ==
- I Know A Song: A Journey With Alzheimer's Disease This documentary shows that Alzheimer's disease need not be the end of a loving relationship.
- The Chinese Hospice In Beijing stands the only hospital in China to specialize in allowing people approaching the end of their lives to die with dignity.
- "She Misses Him", written by Tim Johnson and performed by Tim Rushlow. The song is about an Alzheimer's victim.

== 2001 ==
- Iris, a film that depicts the story of Anglo-Irish novelist Iris Murdoch and her relationship with John Bayley. The film contrasts the start of their relationship and their later life, when Murdoch (played by Dame Judi Dench) was suffering from Alzheimer's disease. The film is based on Bayley's memoir Elegy for Iris.
- Amanda's Choice, a film that discusses early-onset Alzheimer's, a much rarer form of the disease.
- Beautiful Memories (Se souvenir des belles choses), a French film about a young mother with early-onset Alzheimer's.

== 2002 ==
- Stolen Memories: Alzheimer's Disease, a film by Rachel Stace and Rebecca Mellor. Filmed over ten months, Stolen Memories follows three people in their fifties who have been recently diagnosed with Alzheimer's disease.

== 2003 ==
- Age No Problem, a film about a company based in Needham, Massachusetts, which only employs elderly staff members
- The Alzheimer Case
- Dying at Grace
- A Song for Martin
- Long Shadows: Stories from a Jewish Home, a film that examines the impact of institutionalizing the care of aging survivors of Holocaust who must transition to an old-age facility. Dementia, memory loss and physical immobility.

== 2004 ==
- The Forgetting: A Portrait of Alzheimer's, a documentary aired on PBS, Emmy award winner
- A Moment to Remember is a Korean film which depicts the story of a young couple where the wife who has Alzheimer's.
- The Notebook, a film adaptation of Nicholas Sparks's book, depicts a woman with Alzheimer's and how her husband copes with the disease. Rachel McAdams and Ryan Gosling star.
- SONNY BOY is the story of the cross-country journey of Soleil Moon Frye, and her father, Virgil Frye, who is suffering from Alzheimer's disease.

== 2005 ==
- The first three seasons of the TV series Grey's Anatomy featured a running subplot of Meredith Grey's struggle, first to keep her mother's (Ellis Grey) Alzheimer's a secret, and then to cope with her mother's disease as her state worsened.
- Thanmathra (Malayalam: Molecule) is an Indian Malayalam film directed by Blessy which portrays the effects of Alzheimer's disease on the life of an individual and his family.
- "Memory for Max, Claire, Ida and Company"

== 2006 ==
- Memories of Tomorrow, a Japanese film, starring Ken Watanabe, tells a story of a 49-year-old man suffering from Alzheimer's disease and burden of care put on his wife.
- Away from Her is English Canadian actor Sarah Polley's directorial debut. The film is based on Alice Munro's short story "The Bear Came Over the Mountain", from the 2001 collection "Hateship, Friendship, Courtship, Loveship, Marriage". The film stars Gordon Pinsent and Julie Christie as a couple whose marriage is tested when Christie's character begins to suffer from Alzheimer's and moves into a nursing home, where she loses virtually all memory of her husband and begins to develop a romance with another nursing home resident.
- Zulene: Lady in Red
- Family Matters: Coming Together for Alzheimer's
- Christine and Paul- A Journey With Alzheimer's Disease Christine, a 46-year-old mother of three, with a distinguished career in science, was diagnosed with Alzheimer's disease. Recently divorced from an abusive husband, the news sent her into a tailspin, and was emotionally devastating for her daughters, as well. Three years after her diagnosis, she met Paul Bryden, a former diplomat. Despite her diagnosis, they fell in love and married; two super achievers, with one embarking on an inevitable journey of decline.
- Quick Brown Fox

== 2007 ==
- Malcolm and Barbara — A Love Story (1999) TV documentaries and Malcolm and Barbara: Love's Farewell (2007), featured Malcolm Pointon who was diagnosed with Alzheimer's at the age of 51. Over a period of 14 years Paul Watson followed Malcolm and Barbara Pointon's lives. The documentary follows the couple as Malcolm succumbs to the disease and shows the harsh reality faced by caregivers. The 2007 programme was the target of controversy when initial media claims that the finale purported to show Malcolm's death from the disease, but insider sources revealed that in the closing shots of the documentary actually show Malcolm slipping into a coma from which he never recovered. The argument overshadowed the importance of the documentary, and when it aired on 8 August 2007 the narrator informs us that "Malcolm is in a coma, and dies three days later."
- And Then There Were Four The film depicts such a situation as we see the daily life of a frail 77- year-old grandmother who is raising four grandsons aged 5–8
- The BBC radio soap opera The Archers has had a long-running subplot about the development of the character Jack Woolley Alzheimer's disease, winning a Mental Health Media Award in 2007.
- My Name Is Lisa, a short film about Alzheimer's disease
- Still Alice, a novel by Lisa Genova, depicts Alice Howland, a 50-year-old linguistics professor coping with early onset Alzheimer's

== 2008 ==
- Terry Pratchett Documentaries, In April 2008, the BBC began working with Terry Pratchett to make a documentary series based on his illness. The first part (of two) was broadcast on BBC Two on 4 February 2009.
- "Mum and Me" a BBC documentary made by Sue Bourne about her mothers Alzheimer's
- U, Me aur Hum (translates as: You, me and us) a Bollywood film, with Kajol Devgan playing an Alzheimer's disease patient.
- Ruth's Locket, Alzheimer's Short Film, Summer 2008
- The Alzheimer Sea Exploring the slow erosion of personality that this disease inflicts
- Annie Girardot, ainsi va la vie, a documentary film by Nicolas Baulieu
- Choke, a 2008 film by Clark Gregg
- Diminished Capacity with Alan Alda and Matthew Broderick
- Pandora's Box

== 2009 ==
- The Alzheimer's Project films The Alzheimer's Project consists of a series of 4 films. The anchor of the series is Momentum in Science which features 25 leading scientists, a primetime state-of-the-science report revealing the most cutting-edge research advances. The three additional primetime specials (The Memory Lost Tapes; Grandpa, Will You Remember Me? with Maria Shriver; and Caregivers) capture what it means to experience the disease, to be a child or grandchild of one who suffers, and to care for those who are affected. The project includes four documentaries, 15 short films, a book, a community outreach program and a website
- Forgetful Not Forgotten
- You Are Here, film
- I Remember Better When I Paint is an international documentary inspired by the story of Hilda Goldblatt Gorenstein (Hilgos) that focuses on how the creative arts can help Alzheimer's patients re-engage in life. The film is narrated by Academy Award winning actress Olivia de Havilland. Featured in the documentary is Yasmin Aga Khan, president of Alzheimer's Disease International and daughter of Rita Hayworth, who had Alzheimer's. The French version of the film "Je me souviens mieux quand je peins" was released in September 2009 as part of French Alzheimer Association's awareness raising activities on World Alzheimer's Day. The film is co-directed by Eric Ellena and Berna Huebner
- Alzheimer's Disease: Facing the Facts received the 2009 Boston/New England Emmy award
- I Forgot to Tell You by Omar Sharif
- L'oeil de Verre, a film by Fréderick Compain about the work of William Utermohlen, (in Paris)
- Living With Alzheimer's
- Going Home
- Facing the Facts won a regional Emmy in May
- Is There Anybody There about a very funny and very touching relationship between an old man who was sent to an old people's home for his final days and a young boy who is stuck there because his parents own it.
- Lick Salt A Grandson's Tale, Ryan has been out of touch with his family, and especially his grandmother whom he has not seen in fifteen years... until his grandfather's funeral reconnects them. She is lonely though feisty, and suffering from dementia.
- "Grandpa, Do You Know Who I Am?", an episode of The Alzheimer's Project on HBO written by Maria Shriver

== 2010 ==
- Dear Dad, documentary short about former Philadelphia Eagles football player Pete Pihos as he battles Alzheimer's.
- Schism
- Egyptian Actor Adel Emam performed a comedy film entitled Alzheimer's it was released in November 2010.
- L'Absence
- Dementia With Dignity
- Alzheimer: ¿y tu quien eres?
- Telling It Like It Is an intimate look at the life and work of American born painter William Utermohlen
- Behrooz Afkhami is Directing a film about Alzheimer's disease entitled: This is not my house.
- "Raymond", co-written and recorded by Brett Eldredge, is also about an Alzheimer's patient.
- Raising Hope, a television comedy depicting an extended family revolving around a 23-year-old and his baby, his adult parents, and his grandmother who has dementia.
- Inside My Being a short film by Roberto Carlo Chiesa, shown from the point-of-view and told by the voice of an Alzheimer's patient.
- Barney's Version is a film based on the novel of the same name where the story is told from the main character's perspective. Throughout the story he is developing Alzheimer's and is diagnosed with the disease.
- The film Poetry is a story of a suburban woman in her 60s who begins to grow an interest for poetry while struggling with Alzheimer's disease and her irresponsible grandson.
- The comic Tangles. A Story about Alzheimer's, my mother and me by Sarah Leavitt is an autobiographic account of the author's experience before and during her mother's struggle with Alzheimer's disease.
- Tracy and Jess: Living With Early Onset Alzheimer's
- You're Looking at Me Like I Live Here and I Don't is an account of life inside the Traditions Alzheimer's & Dementia Care Unit

== 2011 ==
- Before We Forget, a film about Joyce Fernandez, a 50-year-old woman caring for her mother Celine, who has had Alzheimer's Disease for 7 years, and Dr Irene Giam (PhD), a former mathematics tutor and atheist with strong views about death in the face of terminal illness. Directed by two Singaporean youths, this hour-long film is an observational documentary about two women with dementia who live in an Asian society where terminal illnesses and dying remain taboo.
- Arrugas (transl. Wrinkles), an animated film, based on a Spanish comic book, about a man who faces Alzheimer's, and his newfound life in an elderly care facility.
- Rise of the Planet of the Apes, a film in which a scientist in San Francisco seeks a cure for his father's Alzheimer's disease. He tests a promising drug on chimpanzees, significantly enhancing their cognitive abilities and leading to unintended consequences.
- An Empty Bliss Beyond This World, an album by English musician Leyland James Kirby, based on a study regarding people with Alzheimer's disease being able to remember music they listened to when they were younger, as well as where they were and how they felt when they listened to it.
- Stuff, a documentary about men losing fathers

== 2012 ==
- A Good Man, a book about Sargent Shriver written by his son Mark, 1st President of the Peace Corps, who had Alzheimer's
- I Remember, a published song recorded by Tish Tindall to help raise awareness of Alzheimer's in Scotland. The single was launched in February and later was released as a single on 2 March 2012. The project has been fully supported by Alzheimer's Scotland.
- First Cousin Once Removed, by filmmaker Alan Berliner. A documentary feature film about Edwin Honig and Honig's loss of memory due to Alzheimer's.

== 2013 ==
- Mai, a 2013 Bollywood Hindi language film showed the title character, played by Asha Bhosle, to be a 65-year-old woman suffering from Alzheimer's disease.
- Stacey Solomon won a jackpot of £20,000 on the ITV quiz show Tipping Point: Lucky Stars for the announced benefit of Alzheimer's Research UK.
- The Genius of Marian is a documentary about a mother and daughter with Alzheimer's.

== 2014 ==
- Still Alice, a film adaptation of Lisa Genova's 2007 novel, starring Julianne Moore as Alice.
- The Taking of Deborah Logan, a found footage horror film about a woman with Alzheimer's who becomes possessed.
- Head Full of Honey, a German drama film directed by Til Schweiger.
- "I'm Not Gonna Miss You", co-written and recorded by Glen Campbell, is also about his own diagnosis of Alzheimer's disease and his future living with the disease. The song won "Best Country Song" at the 2015 Grammy Awards.
- Whisper If I Forget, a Turkish film about a woman with Alzheimer's returning to her childhood home where she remembers her old days of climbing the stairs of fame and fortune while trying to deal with her older sister who holds her responsible for her ruined life.
- BoJack Horseman, an adult animated TV series directed by Raphael Bob-Waksberg, depicts Beatrice Horseman, BoJack's mother, and her multiple difficulties with trying to distinguish reality from memory, much to the chagrin of her son.

== 2016 ==
- Godhi Banna Sadharana Mykattu, Indian Kannada film directed by Hemanth Rao deals with a middle-aged person suffering from Alzheimer's disease.
- The Greatest Love (Philippine TV series), a Philippine melodrama TV Series directed by Jeffrey Jeturian about Gloria, a 59-year-old woman, that strives to keep her family happy. However, her secret illness threatens to destroy all her efforts.
- Between 2016 and 2019, British electronic musician and composer Leyland James Kirby released a group of six albums named Everywhere at the End of Time under the moniker "The Caretaker". Each album musically depicts a specific stage of Alzheimer's disease: the albums are known for their nostalgic and unsettling mood. The project also became a popular Internet meme.

== 2017 ==
- Coco, Pixar Animation Studios film directed by Lee Unkrich. Though it is never explicitly stated, the titular character Mamá Coco displays multiple symptoms of Alzheimer's and very likely has the disease.
- Logan, X-Men film directed by James Mangold depicts Charles Xavier (Patrick Stewart) having Alzheimer's disease.

== 2018 ==
- Head Full of Honey, an American remake of 2014 German film of the same name with Nick Nolte, Matt Dillon, Emily Mortimer, Jacqueline Bisset, and Greta Scacchi.
- Judgement, video game plot centers around various murders which are connected to the development of a potential cure to Alzheimer's.

== 2019 ==
- The Italian journalist and author Michela Farabella published the autobiographical novel Italo, con te partiro in 2019 (Edizione Carello), in which she tells the tale of woe of her father Italo Farabella, who was seriously affected by Alzheimer's disease in old age. Michela Farabella combines the portrayal of the tragic story of her father's four-year odyssey in Turin between homes for dementia patients and hospitals with criticism of the Italian health system for its treatment of elderly Alzheimer's patients.
- Everywhere, an empty bliss, an album by The Caretaker using outtakes from Everywhere at the End of Time

== 2020 ==
- Anthony Hopkins stars in the film The Father, Florian Zeller's directorial debut. Based on Zeller's 2012 play Le Père, it is co-written by Christopher Hampton and is the second adaptation of the play following 2015's Floride. Sir Anthony Hopkins depicts a Welshman living with progressive Alzheimer's disease in his London flat, Olivia Colman portrays his daughter, and Mark Gatiss, Imogen Poots, Rufus Sewell, and Olivia Williams also star.
