= Olivia de Havilland filmography =

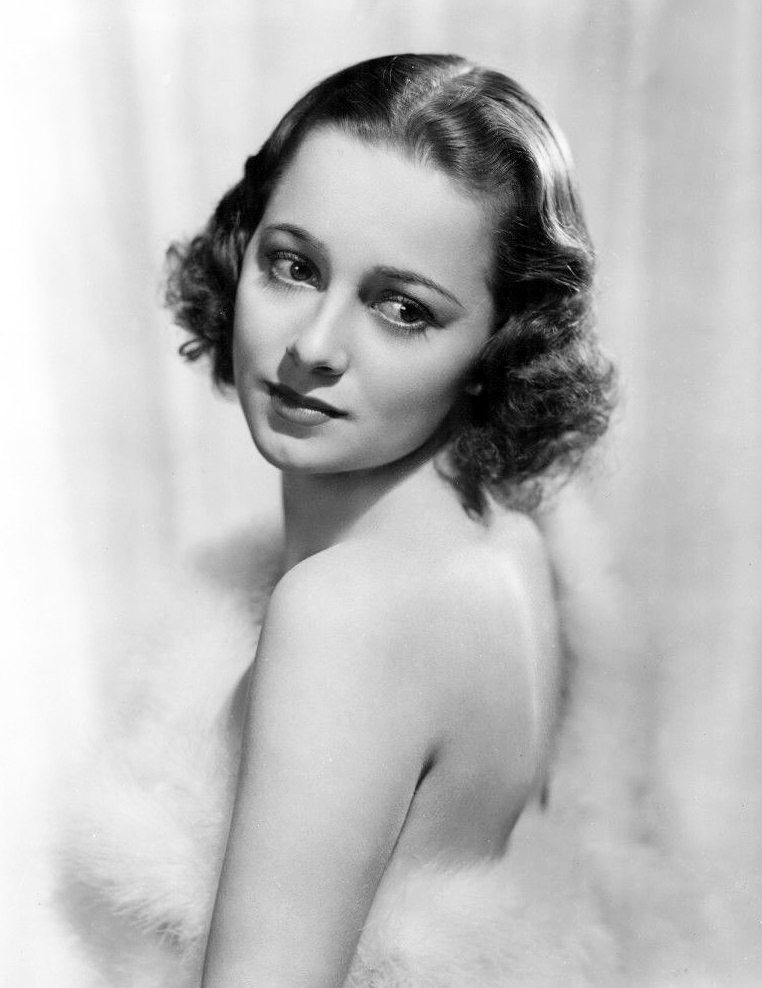
Publicity photo of Olivia de Havilland, 1938.

This filmography lists the film appearances of British-American actress Olivia de Havilland (1916–2020), as well as her television, stage, and radio credits. De Havilland's career spanned fifty-three years, from 1935 to 1988. During that time, she appeared in forty-nine feature films, and was one of the leading movie stars during the golden age of Classical Hollywood. She is best known for her early screen performances in The Adventures of Robin Hood (1938) and Gone with the Wind (1939), and her later award-winning performances in To Each His Own (1946), The Snake Pit (1948), and The Heiress (1949). De Havilland made her screen debut in Reinhardt's film adaptation A Midsummer Night's Dream in 1935. She began her career playing demure ingénues opposite popular leading men of that time, including Errol Flynn, with whom she made her breakout film Captain Blood in 1935. They would go on to make seven more feature films together, and became one of Hollywood's most popular romantic on-screen pairings.

De Havilland's range of performances included roles in most major movie genres. She achieved her initial popularity in romantic comedy films, such as The Great Garrick (1937) and Hard to Get (1938), and in Western adventure films, such as Dodge City (1939), Santa Fe Trail (1940), and They Died with Their Boots On. Her natural beauty and refined acting style made her particularly effective in historical dramas, such as Anthony Adverse (1936) and My Cousin Rachel (1952), and romantic drama films, such as Hold Back the Dawn (1941). In her later career, she was most successful in drama films, such as In This Our Life (1942) and Light in the Piazza (1962), and unglamorous roles in psychological dramas, such films as The Dark Mirror (1946) and Hush...Hush, Sweet Charlotte (1964).

In addition to her active film career, de Havilland continued her work in the theatre, appearing three times on Broadway, in Romeo and Juliet (1951), Candida (1952), and A Gift of Time (1962) with Henry Fonda. She also worked in television, appearing in two successful miniseries, Roots: The Next Generations (1979) and North and South II (1986), and television feature films, such as Anastasia: The Mystery of Anna, for which she received a Primetime Emmy Award nomination. During her career, de Havilland won two Academy Awards for To Each His Own and The Heiress, two Golden Globe Awards for The Heiress and Anastasia: The Mystery of Anna, two New York Film Critics Circle Awards for The Snake Pit and The Heiress, the National Board of Review Award for Best Actress and the Venice Film Festival Volpi Cup for The Snake Pit.

== Filmography ==
=== Features ===
Year	Title	Role	Director	Leading man	Studio	Notes	Ref
1935	Alibi Ike	Dolly Stevens	Ray Enright	Joe E. Brown	Warner Bros.		
1935	The Irish in Us	Lucille Jackson	Lloyd Bacon	James Cagney	Warner Bros.		
1935	A Midsummer Night's Dream	Hermia	Max Reinhardt; William Dieterle	Dick Powell	Warner Bros.	Film debut	
1935	Captain Blood	Arabella Bishop	Michael Curtiz	Errol Flynn	Warner Bros.		
1936	Anthony Adverse	Angela Guisseppi	Mervyn LeRoy	Fredric March	Warner Bros.		
1936	The Charge of the Light Brigade	Elsa Campbell	Michael Curtiz	Errol Flynn	Warner Bros.		
1937	Call It a Day	Catherine Hilton	Archie Mayo	Ian Hunter	Warner Bros.		
1937	It's Love I'm After	Marcia West	Archie Mayo	Leslie Howard	Warner Bros.		
1937	The Great Garrick	Germaine de la Corbe	James Whale	Brian Aherne	Warner Bros.		
1938	Gold Is Where You Find It	Serena Ferris	Michael Curtiz	George Brent	Warner Bros.		
1938	The Adventures of Robin Hood	Maid Marian	Michael Curtiz; William Keighley	Errol Flynn	Warner Bros.		
1938	Four's a Crowd	Lorri Dillingwell	Michael Curtiz	Errol Flynn	Warner Bros.		
1938	Hard to Get	Margaret 'Maggie' Richards	Ray Enright	Dick Powell	Warner Bros.		
1939	Wings of the Navy	Irene Dale	Lloyd Bacon	George Brent	Warner Bros.		
1939	Dodge City	Abbie Irving	Michael Curtiz	Errol Flynn	Warner Bros.		
1939	The Private Lives of Elizabeth and Essex	Lady Penelope Gray	Michael Curtiz	Errol Flynn	Warner Bros.		
1939	Raffles	Gwen Manders	Sam Wood	David Niven	United Artists		
1939	Gone with the Wind	Melanie Hamilton Wilkes	Victor Fleming	Clark Gable	MGM	Nominated – Academy Award for Best Supporting Actress	
1940	My Love Came Back	Amelia Cornell	Curtis Bernhardt	Jeffrey Lynn	Warner Bros.		
1940	Santa Fe Trail	Kit Carson Holliday	Michael Curtiz	Errol Flynn	Warner Bros.		
1941	The Strawberry Blonde	Amy Lind Grimes	Raoul Walsh	James Cagney	Warner Bros.		
1941	Hold Back the Dawn	Emmy Brown	Mitchell Leisen	Charles Boyer	Paramount	Nominated – Academy Award for Best Actress	
1941	They Died with Their Boots On	Elizabeth Bacon Custer	Raoul Walsh	Errol Flynn	Warner Bros.		
1942	The Male Animal	Ellen Turner	Elliott Nugent	Henry Fonda	Warner Bros.		
1942	In This Our Life	Roy Timberlake	John Huston	George Brent	Warner Bros.		
1943	Thank Your Lucky Stars	Herself	David Butler	Eddie Cantor	Warner Bros.	Cameo	
1943	Princess O'Rourke	Princess Maria, also known as Mary Williams	Norman Krasna	Robert Cummings	Warner Bros.		
1943	Government Girl	Elizabeth "Smokey" Allard	Dudley Nichols	Sonny Tufts	RKO		
1946	To Each His Own	Miss Josephine 'Jody' Norris	Mitchell Leisen	John Lund	Paramount	Won – Academy Award for Best Actress	
1946	Devotion	Charlotte Brontë	Curtis Bernhardt	Paul Henreid	Warner Bros.		
1946	The Well Groomed Bride	Margie Dawson	Sidney Lanfield	Ray Milland	Paramount		
1946	The Dark Mirror	Terry Collins / Ruth Collins	Robert Siodmak	Lew Ayres	Universal		
1948	The Snake Pit	Virginia Stuart Cunningham	Anatole Litvak	Mark Stevens	20th Century Fox	Won – National Board of Review Award for Best Actress; Won – New York Film Critics Circle Award for Best Actress; Won – Volpi Cup; Nominated – Academy Award for Best Actress	
1949	The Heiress	Catherine Sloper	William Wyler	Montgomery Clift	Paramount	Won – Academy Award for Best Actress; Won – Golden Globe Award for Best Actress – Motion Picture Drama; Won – New York Film Critics Circle Award for Best Actress	
1952	My Cousin Rachel	Rachel Sangalletti Ashley	Henry Koster	Richard Burton	20th Century Fox	Nominated – Golden Globe Award for Best Actress – Motion Picture Drama	
1955	That Lady	Ana de Mendoza	Terence Young	Gilbert Roland	20th Century Fox		
1955	Not as a Stranger	Kristina Hedvigson	Stanley Kramer	Robert Mitchum	United Artists		
1956	The Ambassador's Daughter	Joan Fisk	Norman Krasna	John Forsythe	United Artists		
1958	The Proud Rebel	Linnett Moore	Michael Curtiz	Alan Ladd	Buena Vista		
1959	Libel	Lady Margaret Loddon	Anthony Asquith	Dirk Bogarde	MGM		
1962	Light in the Piazza	Meg Johnson	Guy Green	Rossano Brazzi	MGM		
1964	Lady in a Cage	Mrs. Cornelia Hilyard	Walter Grauman	James Caan	Paramount		
1964	Hush...Hush, Sweet Charlotte	Miriam Deering	Robert Aldrich	Joseph Cotten	20th Century Fox		
1970	The Adventurers	Deborah Hadley	Lewis Gilbert	Charles Aznavour	Paramount		
1972	Pope Joan	Mother Superior	Michael Anderson	Franco Nero	Columbia		
1977	Airport '77	Emily Livingston	Jerry Jameson	Jack Lemmon	Universal		
1978	The Swarm	Maureen Schuester	Irwin Allen	Michael Caine	Warner Bros.		
1979	The Fifth Musketeer	Queen Anne	Ken Annakin	Beau Bridges	Columbia	Filmed in 1976	
2009	I Remember Better When I Paint	Narrator	Eric Ellena; Berna Huebner	—	French Connection Films	Voice	

=== Short subjects ===
Year	Title	Role	Director	Leading man	Studio	Notes	Ref
1935	A Dream Comes True	Herself (uncredited)	—	—	Warner Bros.	About the making of A Midsummer Night's Dream	
1936	The Making of a Great Motion Picture	Herself (uncredited)	—	—	Warner Bros.	About the making of Anthony Adverse	
1937	A Day at Santa Anita	Herself (uncredited)	Bobby Connolly	—	Warner Bros.	Stars attended a horse race at the famed racetrack	
1937	Screen Snapshots Series 16, No. 10	Herself	Ralph Staub	—	Columbia	Stars and their pets attend a swim meet	
1940	Cavalcade of the Academy Awards	Herself	—	—	Warner Bros.	Highlights of acceptance speeches for films released in 1939	
1942	Breakdowns of 1942	Herself (uncredited)	—	—	Warner Bros.	Annual dinner for the staff at Warner Bros.	
1943	Show Business at War	Herself	Louis de Rochemont	—	20th Century Fox	Newsreel about progress of the Hollywood war effort	

=== Television work ===
Year	Title	Role	Director	Leading man	Network	Notes	Ref
1966	ABC Stage 67	Ellie Thompson	Sam Peckinpah	Jason Robards	ABC	Episode: "Noon Wine"	
1972	The Screaming Woman	Laura Wynant	Jack Smight	Ed Nelson	ABC	Movie	
1979	Roots: The Next Generations	Mrs. Warner	John Erman; Charles S. Dubin	James Earl Jones	ABC	Miniseries (2 episodes)	
1981	The Love Boat	Aunt Hilly	Ray Austin	Gavin MacLeod	ABC	Episode: "Aunt Hilly"	
1982	Murder Is Easy	Honoria Waynflete	Claude Whatham	Bill Bixby	CBS	Movie	
1982	The Royal Romance of Charles and Diana	Queen Elizabeth, The Queen Mother	Peter Levin	Christopher Baines	CBS	Movie	
1986	North and South: Book II	Mrs. Neal	Kevin Connor	Patrick Swayze	ABC	Miniseries (6 episodes)	
1986	Anastasia: The Mystery of Anna	Dowager Empress Maria Feodorovna	Marvin J. Chomsky	Rex Harrison	NBC	Won – Golden Globe Award for Best Supporting Actress – Series, Miniseries or Television Film; Nominated — Emmy Award for Outstanding Supporting Actress – Miniseries or a Movie	
1988	The Woman He Loved	Aunt Bessie Merryman	Charles Jarrott	Anthony Andrews	CBS	Movie (final film role)	

== Stage appearances ==
Year	Title	Role	Director	Leading man	Theater	Ref
1934	A Midsummer Night's Dream	Hermia	Max Reinhardt	—	Hollywood Bowl, Hollywood, CA	
1946	What Every Woman Knows	Maggie Wylie	Phyllis Loughton	—	Westport Country Playhouse, Westport, CT	
1951	Romeo and Juliet	Juliet	Peter Glenville	Douglass Watson	Broadhurst Theatre, NYC, Broadway debut	
1952	Candida	Candida	Herman Shumlin	Bramwell Fletcher	National Theatre, NYC	
1962	A Gift of Time	Lael Tucker Wertenbaker	Garson Kanin	Henry Fonda	Ethel Barrymore Theatre, NYC	

== Radio appearances ==
Year	Title	Role	Director	Leading man	Episode	Ref
1937	Lux Radio Theatre	Arabella Bishop	—	Errol Flynn	Captain Blood	
1946	Academy Award Theater	Ella Bishop	—		Cheers for Miss Bishop	
