= Hilgos Foundation =

Nonprofit organization supporting artistic creation of people with memory impairment

The Hilgos Foundation is a nonprofit organization that supports the ongoing process of artistic creation for people who have different forms of memory impairment such as Alzheimer's disease.

== Background ==
The Hilgos Foundation was founded by Berna Huebner in 1999. Huebner enlisted art students to work with her mother Hilda (Hilgos) Gorenstein who had Alzheimer's disease. The use of art opened a dialogue of communication that had been closed for years. In memory of her mother, Huebner founded the Hilgos Foundation which provides grants to art students who work with Alzheimer's patients. Students in the Hilgos project, in which "Hilgos scholars" participate each academic year, have served hundreds of people with Alzheimer's.

== Documentary film and book ==
To further raise visibility of the arts and Alzheimer's, the Hilgos Foundation co-produced an international documentary film, I Remember Better When I Paint, narrated by Olivia de Havilland. The film, co-directed by Huebner and filmmaker Eric Ellena, was inspired by the words of Hilgos who in the midst of Alzheimer's said "I remember better when I paint." The documentary shows how the creative arts can help improve quality of life for Alzheimer's patients not only through creation and performance of art and music but also from exposure to the arts around the world, such as the Louvre museum. The documentary also shares findings by leading neurologists offering scientific support regarding the transforming power of the arts for people with Alzheimer's. The film includes an interview with Yasmin Aga Khan, actress Rita Hayworth's daughter; Hayworth developed early-onset Alzheimer's and also had painted. The film has been broadcast nationwide on public television stations in the United States.

The Foundation has also produced a book based on Hilgos entitled I Remember Better When I Paint: Art and Alzheimer's: Opening Doors, Making Connections describing how people affected with dementia can be reconnected to themselves and how communications channels can be reopened through the creative arts.

== Social media ==
The Hilgos Foundation was a 2015 Shorty Awards finalist in the charity category. Also known as the Shorties, it is an annual awards event that honors the best in social media. From the seven finalists, the 2015 Shorty Award for the best in charity was awarded to the Gates Foundation. In 2020, the Hilgos Foundation account was named among the top ten best in Twitter in the annual WEGO Health Activists Awards. The Hilgos Foundation is the co-host and founder of the weekly Twitter driven dementia caregiver discussion #AlzChat.
