= Arts & Minds =

Non-profit for Alzheimer's patients

- Founded: 2010
- Founder: Carolyn Halpin-Healy; James M. Noble, M.D.
- Type: Non-profit organization
- Location: New York City, United States
- Website: artsandminds.org

Arts & Minds is a non-profit organization committed to improving quality of life for people living with Alzheimer's disease and other dementias.

It provides art-centered activities to create positive cognitive experiences and enhance communication. Its programs empower people with dementia, family members and professional caregivers to strengthen social, emotional, and spiritual bonds by engaging with art. Through shared engagement with art in conversation with educators and one another, adults living with cognitive challenges experience social connection and self-discovery.

Established in 2010 by Columbia University clinical neurologist James M. Noble, M.D. and museum educator Carolyn Halpin-Healy, Arts & Minds takes an interdisciplinary approach to dementia and art. The organization provides consulting and training for museums, caregivers and medical professionals. It first started at the Studio Museum in Harlem and also has programs at the New-York Historical Society and the Metropolitan Museum of Art in New York.

== Partnerships ==
Arts & Minds partners with various institutions to bring programming for people with dementia and their care partners into different cultural spaces and also offers training to museum staff and cultural institutions to give them the tools to bolster their own programming.

=== The Arts in Health ===
The Laurie M. Tisch Illumination Fund published a Progress Report 2018-2024 for their Arts in Health Initiative, which featured Arts & Minds within their Aging-Related Diseases category.

== See also ==
- Art and dementia
- Caregiving and dementia
- I Remember Better When I Paint, a documentary about arts and dementia care.
