= Lorena Kloosterboer =

Dutch-Argentine artist (born 1962)

Tempus ad Requiem V by Lorena Kloosterboer

Lorena Kloosterboer is a Dutch-Argentine artist (born Alkmaar, Netherlands, 1962) who paints using trompe-l'œil, hyperrealism, and photorealistic styles, often creating the illusion of three-dimensional objects on a two-dimensional surface. She is best known for her hyperrealist still life paintings of idiosyncratic compositions made of glass and porcelain pieces. Her paintings have been exhibited and awarded in several countries worldwide. As a sculptor Kloosterboer has created a number of bronze pieces which are displayed in public in the city of Wassenaar. Also, the artist has published several books on painting techniques.

== Career ==
Kloosterboer studied fine arts at the Instituto de Bellas Artes Beato Angélico in Buenos Aires, Argentina. She later attended art classes and workshops for several years at Scottsdale Artist's School in Scottsdale, Arizona. Kloosterboer painting subjects include a wide variety of objects like colorful candies, marbles, shells, silverware, glass and ceramics. An evolving series of Kloosterboer's paintings entitled Tempus ad Requiem ('Time to Rest' in Latin) depicts still lifes with birds. "This series of still lifes featuring birds perched on ceramic or glass objects symbolizes the need for a time and a place to rest, to come to terms with life's hurdles and replenish our energies".

== Sculptures ==
In 1991 Kloosterboer unveiled her first bronze sculpture representing a jester officially named De Nar. It was commissioned to celebrate the 25th anniversary of a Dutch carnival group: De Deylknotsen. This jester is on public display at De Warenar, the official cultural center in Wassenaar. During the following years Kloosterboer also created a commissioned series of four bronze sculptures popularly known as De Boomstronken (The Tree Trunks), which are on public display in Wassenaar. Color illustrations of these pieces and their locations are shown in the book "Beeldend Wassenaar" offering hiking and biking trails leading past the visual arts in Wassenaar.

== Books ==
- 2014 - Painting in Acrylics: The Indispensable Guide.
- 2014 - Complete Guide to Painting in Acrylics
- 2015 - De Complete Gids voor Acrylverf - Professionele Technieken voor Traditionele Toepassingen

== Critique ==
Kloosterboer's artwork has been favourably reviewed and included among other artists in a book on the history of women painters in the Low Countries authored by Art Historian Professor Katlijne van der Stighelen. Some of Kloosterboer's paintings from her time in the USA are included in a published essay on Trompe L'Oeil in America, by Kevin Sharp. Also, some of her realist paintings were included in Acrylic Artist's Guide to Exceptional Colour (by Lexi Sundell) chosen to illustrate fundamental aspects of color such as temperature, intensity and brightness. Media articles and interviews dealing with Kloosterboer's artwork are available from other sources.

== Exhibitions ==
Kloosterboer's paintings have been exhibited in many countries including Argentina, Belgium, Canada, Denmark, Estonia, France, Germany, Japan, the Netherlands, the United Kingdom, and the United States. Some recent exhibits including her paintings are:

- 2019 MEAM exhibition, Barcelona
- 2015 - IGOR Exhibition - The International Realism Guild's Tenth Annual International Juried Exhibition, at the Principle Gallery in Alexandria, Virginia, USA
- 2015 - Richeson75 International Still Life & Floral Online Exhibition
- 2015 - The R.W. Norton Art Gallery, Shreveport, LA (May 19 - July 26) - Masterworks From The International Guild Of Realism, Museum Tour Produced by David J. Wagner, LLC.
- 2014 - Second Annual Juried Trompe l'Oeil Exhibition, (September 27 – December 31, 2014) at the John F. Peto Studio Museum, Island Heights, NJ
- 2014 - Trompe l'Oeil Exhibition, at Reynolds Fine Art, in New Haven, Connecticut, USA (March 20 - April 30)
- 2013 - Atelier Animal Exhibition, at the CODA Museum, in Apeldoorn, the Netherlands.

Kloosterboer's work was also exhibited in 2010, (J. Willot Gallery, Palm Desert, CA), 2008 (Tempe Center for The Arts, Tempe, AZ), 2008 (Catharine Lorillard Wolfe Art Club, 112th Annual Exhibition, New York, NY), and 2007 (Gallery Fraga, Bainbridge Island, WA),

== Awards ==
Below is a partial list of awards won by the artist.

- 2012 - Second Place for Tempus ad Requiem in the International Artist Magazine Challenge #72 'Favorite Subjects' Competition.
- 2012 - Atelier Award 2012, First Place for Tempus ad Requiem at the CODA Museum, in Apeldoorn, the Netherlands.
- 2012 - Finalist with Tempus ad Requiem in the Richeson 75 International Online Animals, Birds & Wildlife Competition.
- 2011 - Jack Richeson & Co Materials Award for Sapientia at the 4th Annual ISAP Online Signature Members Show.
- 2011 - Ampersand Materials Award for Bon Voyage in the 14th Annual ISAP International Open Exhibition at the Santa Cruz Art League Gallery, in Santa Cruz, California, USA.
- 2009 - Creative Achievement Award for Chalkboard No. 1 - Manet (together with Larry Charles) at the Fourth Annual Juried Exhibition of the International Guild of Realism, at The Weatherburn Gallery, in Naples, Florida, USA.
- 2008 - Best of 2008 in the Still Life Category, for Twice As Much, Cat’s Eyes Marbles and Alternative Anthology in the International Best of 2008 Competition at the Marziart Internationale Galerie, Hamburg, Germany.
- 2006 - Merit Award by Savoir-Faire for Liberty at the 9th Annual International ISAP Exhibition, at the Cornell Museum of Art and History, Delray, Florida, USA.
- 2006 - Creative Achievement Award for Twice As Much at the 2nd Annual Juried Exhibition of the International Guild of Realism, at Manitou Galleries, Santa Fe, New Mexico, USA.
- 2005 - Master Painters of the World, US Showcase, honoring Sunday Best featured in the June/July 2005 issue of International Artist Magazine.
