= Filip Swirski =

American cardiovascular scientist

- Citizenship: United States
- Education: McMaster University, Harvard Medical School
- Known for: Linking atherosclerosis with blood monocytosis, identifying how sleep interruption accelerates atherosclerosis and neutral drift, demonstrating IL-3 role in protecting against Alzheimer's disease
- Awards: Outstanding Investigator Award, NHLBI; Established Investigator Award, American Heart Association
- Scientific career
- Fields: Cardiology, immunology
- Workplaces: Icahn School of Medicine at Mount Sinai, Harvard Medical School, Massachusetts General Hospital
- Website: Swirski Lab

Filip Swirski is a Polish-Canadian-American scientist and educator serving as the Arthur and Janet C. Ross Professor of Medicine, Cardiology and Professor of Radiology at the Icahn School of Medicine at Mount Sinai and is the Director of the Cardiovascular Research Institute. He is also a member of the Biomedical Engineering and Imaging Institute (BMEII), the Marc and Jennifer Lipschultz Precision Immunology Institute (PrIISM), and The Friedman Brain Institutes (FBI) at Mount Sinai. His research partly focuses on innate and inflammatory mechanisms in cardiovascular disease. He is known for his work in cardioimmunology and notably for linking atherosclerosis with blood monocytosis.

== Education and career ==
Swirski earned his Bachelor of Arts and Science specializing in biochemistry and a Ph.D. in immunology at McMaster University, Hamilton, Canada. He received an honorary MS from Harvard Medical School in 2020 for accomplishing a full professorship. He was professor at the Center for Systems Biology at Massachusetts General Hospital and at Harvard Medical School.

== Research and scientific contributions ==
Swirski focuses on understanding how leukocytes shape and are shaped by inflammation. His research uses in vivo models of acute and chronic inflammation relevant to cardiovascular, neurodegenerative, infectious, and metabolic diseases. His writings reflect translational and fundamental cardiovascular and neurodegenerative science research, including cell development, mind-marrow communication, and function.

=== Novel findings ===
==== Monocytes and macrophages ====
- Swirski described that increased blood monocyte levels, otherwise known as monocytosis, develop in response to hypercholesterolemia and is progressive and proportional to disease severity.
- Although monocytes develop predominantly in bone marrow, Swirski showed that hypercholesterolemia leads to monocyte production in the spleen in a process called extramedullary hematopoiesis, which further drives atherosclerosis progression.
- Showed that monocyte-derived macrophages recruited to the atherosclerotic plaque self-renew in the lesion, further accelerating atherosclerosis.
- Described monocyte recruitment during myocardial infarction and showed a role for a splenic monocyte reservoir as a source of monocytes after myocardial infarction.

==== Lifestyle and brain-body communication ====
- Swirski explores how cardiovascular health is affected by diet, sleep, exercise, and other lifestyle patterns. He showed that sleep limits monocyte production, thereby protecting against atherosclerosis.
- Showed that sleep fragmentation increases atherogenesis in a mouse model and demonstrated that sleep disruption increases myelopoiesis in the bone marrow, leading to monocytosis and larger atherosclerotic lesions. The results yielded that the marrow contains a pre-neutrophil that regulates monocyte production via hypocretin-dependent CSF-1. Hypocretin, a wake-promoting hormone in the hypothalamus, communicates with bone marrow and regulates leukocyte production. This demonstrates a brain-marrow axis involving a secreted neuropeptide.
- He demonstrated that sleep interruption increases the rate of hematopoiesis in the bone marrow, which accelerates neutral drift.
- Showed that IL-3 is a crucial communicator between glial cells (microglia) located throughout the brain and spinal cord, and astrocytes. Using mouse models of Alzheimer’s Disease (AD), data showed that IL-3 protects against AD by programming microglia.
- Under psychological stress, neurons from different brain regions control the migration of immune cells in the body. Mice under stress were more prone to higher inflammation and death in response to infection with influenza and SARS-CoV-2.
- Fasting in mice prompts monocytes to re-enter the bone marrow, which increases their lifespan. This process is mediated by the hypothalamic-pituitary-adrenal axis (HPA). Upon re-feeding, distinct monocytes mobilize back to the blood, altering the host's response to infection. The underlying study showed the body can limit energy expenditure when nutrition is scarce. Without it, the body slows down metabolic expenditure, limiting production and preserving—and thus extending—the lifespan of already-made, short-lived monocytes.

==== Immunometabolic communication ====
- Swirski identified an on-demand mechanism by which transient monocyte-derived macrophages dispose of erythrocytes and recycle iron.
- Identified a population of intraepithelial T cells that are strategically positioned in the gut that modulate systemic dietary metabolism. Without these, mice were metabolically hyperactive, and resisted the development of obesity, hypertension, diabetes, and hypercholesterolemia/atherosclerosis.
- Showed that cholesterol sensors called Liver X Receptors were important in developing and functioning T cells in the thymus, the lymphoid gland where T cells are produced.

==== Influence of hematopoietic growth factors ====
- Swirski showed the influence of growth factors in disease, where he described a GM-CSF-producing B cell that protects against sepsis and pneumonia.
- Demonstrated that the growth factor interleukin 3 (IL-3) aggravates sepsis by eliciting a cytokine storm, heightening inflammation leading to death.
- Identified a critical role for IL-3 in myocarditis and showed that IL-3 regulates microglial function in Alzheimer’s Disease.

== Honors and awards ==
Partial list:

- Clarivate Highly Cited Investigators
- Outstanding Investigator Award from the NHLBI (2016-2022)
- Established Investigator Award from the American Heart Association (2017-2022)
- William Harvey Lecture from the European Society of Cardiology (2020)
- Jeffrey M. Hoeg Award from the American Heart Association (2017)
- Martin Prize for Fundamental Research
- Howard M. Goodman Fellowship (2016)

== Publications ==
As of 2024, Swirski is credited with 38,923 citations and has an h-index of 95. His most cited contributions to date are on myocardial infarction, ventricular remodeling, inflammation, stem cell niche, hematopoiesis and hematopoietic stem cells. Between 2018 and 2019, articles reportedly focused mostly on inflammation (43.72%), bone marrow (17.21%) and immune system (17.21%).

=== Articles ===
Five most-cited peer-reviewed publications as of 2024 include:

- The healing myocardium sequentially mobilizes two monocyte subsets with divergent and complementary functions M Nahrendorf, FK Swirski, E Aikawa, L Stangenberg, T Wurdinger, ...The Journal of experimental medicine 204 (12), 3037-3047 PMID 18025128 Cited by 2537
- Identification of splenic reservoir monocytes and their deployment to inflammatory sites FK Swirski, M Nahrendorf, M Etzrodt, M Wildgruber, V Cortez-Retamozo, ...Science 325 (5940), 612-616 PMID 19644120 Cited by 2503
- Ly-6C^{hi} monocytes dominate hypercholesterolemia-associated monocytosis and give rise to macrophages in atheromata FK Swirski, P Libby, E Aikawa, P Alcaide, FW Luscinskas, R Weissleder, ...The Journal of clinical investigation 117 (1), 195-205 PMID 19644120 Cited by 1409
- Cytokine storm and sepsis disease pathogenesis. Semin Immunopathol Chousterman BG, Swirski FK, Weber GF. . 2017 Jul;39(5):517-528. doi: 10.1007/s00281-017-0639-8. Epub 2017 May 29. PMID 28555385 Cited by 1214
- Local proliferation dominates lesional macrophage accumulation in atherosclerosis. Robbins CS, Hilgendorf I, Weber GF, Theurl I, Iwamoto Y, Figueiredo JL, Gorbatov R, Sukhova GK, Gerhardt LM, Smyth D, Zavitz CC, Shikatani EA, Parsons M, van Rooijen N, Lin HY, Husain M, Libby P, Nahrendorf M, Weissleder R, Swirski FK. Nat Med. 2013 Sep;19(9):1166-72. doi: 10.1038/nm.3258. Epub 2013 Aug 11. PMID 23933982 Cited by 1116

=== Book chapters ===
- Swirski, F.K., Nahrendorf, M. and Libby, P. (2017). Mechanisms of Myeloid Cell Modulation of Atherosclerosis. In Myeloid Cells in Health and Disease, S. Gordon (Ed.).
- Pittet, M.J., Nahrendorf, M. and Swirski, F.K. (2014), The journey from stem cell to macrophage. Ann. N.Y. Acad. Sci., 1319: 1-18.
- Monocyte subset dynamics in human atherosclerosis Recent Advances in Nanotechnology, Page: 71-83, 2011

== See also ==
- Lifestyle disease
- Hypothalamic-pituitary-adrenal axis
- Alzheimer's disease in the media
- Brain–body interaction
