= Art and dementia =

The use case of art in dementia care is a valuable tool in enriching and enhancing the lives of people with dementia.

== Background ==
Being engaged with visual arts and performing arts provides opportunities for people with dementia to express themselves creatively. Through the process of creating an image or participating in a song, for example, a person with dementia may access long-term memories or short-term memories. Being engaged in the arts may provide access to emotions, self-exploration, thoughts, dreams and hopes.

While scientists are racing to find a cure, according to the Alzheimer Society of Canada, about half a million Canadians were living with dementia in 2009, and this number is expected to rise to 1 million by 2030. The arts provide a non-pharmaceutical approach that helps alleviate anxiety and confusion and provide some respite for people with dementia and their caregivers. Being engaged in the arts is a positive way of maintaining or improving one's quality of life, especially those who live with dementia.

== Types of artistic therapy for dementia ==
Different forms of art (visual arts, music, etc.) are used for therapy with dementia patients. The forms of art therapy for dementia are numerous and, according to one 2018 study, can include active and/or passive engagement in the arts through "literary (e.g., reading aloud, poetry reciting, or creative writing); performing (e.g., music, dance, theatre) and visual (e.g., gallery visits, making art)" engagement, along with, arguably, hobbies such as gardening, needlework, and cooking.

=== Music therapy ===
The Alzheimer's Association in the US mentions that music can be very beneficial for those with Alzheimer's specifically. Music therapy can be especially powerful as, in many cases, "the medium of art provides access to an otherwise-unreachable personal history and identity."

The Alzheimer's Association notes some specific guidelines for those looking to incorporate music into care:

- Choose (or let the individual choose) more familiar music
- Use music that matches the desired mood
- Avoid music with too many commercial interruptions when possible, and try to limit other sources of sound that may cause confusion or sensory overload

=== Art therapy ===
Art therapy often involves creating works of art by painting, sculpting, etc., but may also involve viewing art either on a computer or in a physical location. The type of engagement can change to accommodate the individual's needs and circumstances, offering flexibility.

Some people with dementia find they have a boost in creativity, especially within visual arts. Offering visual art as a tool for communication and self-expression can enable such individuals to find a new strength and self-confidence.

As with music, the Alzheimer's Association notes specific guidelines for art therapy:

- Provide encouragement and discuss their project
- Be patient with the individual; do not rush their work or try to force them to finish it
- Offer basic guidance and assistance to start, with additional guidance as needed
- Avoid toxic or potentially harmful substances or tools
- Avoid making the project too childish or demeaning

== Benefits ==
Engagement with the arts offers potential benefits for those with dementia.

These benefits can include, but may not be limited to:

- Emotional management through creativity (Evidence suggests art can help reduce anxiety and agitation associated with memory loss)
- The facilitation of social connection when these activities are done alongside others
- Creation of new memories
- Facilitation of communication, even when language is lost or inaccessible

=== Neurocognitive Benefits ===
- Individuals with dementia that express themselves through art or music may increase neural connections in the hippocampus, which plays a role in memory, and the amygdala, which is involved in processing emotions.
- Engaging in creative thinking may strengthen communication between neurons, which could potentially slow the progression of dementia.
- Those who have mild cognitive impairments are at risk of getting dementia. However, expressing themselves through art has suggested improvements in the brain and stronger activity in the right anterior cingulate is responsible for attention, emotions, motivation, and decision-making. Additionally, the paracingulate cortex responsible for sound discrimination had stronger activity.
- With dementia, in some cases, the occipital lobe, a function in the brain that processes visual information, can be affected. Therefore, when creating artwork or copying images it activates this lobe promoting changes such as adapting and repairing.
- Art therapy activates sensory regions in the brain such as the five senses, engaging emotions and memories to appear.
- After art therapy, individuals with dementia showed positive changes in areas such as auditory comprehension (temporal lobes and auditory cortex), visual attention (parietal lobe and posterior parietal cortex), speech (left hemisphere), and executive function (prefrontal cortex).

== Films on art and dementia ==
The documentary film I Remember Better When I Paint examines the way creative arts bypass the limitations of dementias such as Alzheimer's disease. The film highlights how patients' still-vibrant imaginations are strengthened through therapeutic art.

== See also ==
- Caring for people with dementia
- The Society for the Arts in Dementia Care
- Music therapy for Alzheimer's disease
