= Julia O'Rourke =

- Born: New York City
- Years active: 2004–2017, 2022
- Dancing career
- Former groups: Petri School of Irish Dance

Julia O'Rourke is a competitive Irish stepdancer. After being featured in the 2010 Sue Bourne documentary Jig as a competitor at the 2010 Oireachtas Rince na Cruinne (Irish Dancing World Championships), O'Rourke became known as a public face for the dance form globally. She won several further titles before her retirement from competition in 2017.

== Dancing career ==
O'Rourke began taking Irish stepdance classes at the age of 5 after seeing a classmate at elementary school perform the style in a show and tell session. She began lessons at the Petri School of Irish Dancing (later the Doherty-Petri School) in Garden City Park, and continued at the same school until her retirement from competition. At her first feis, she won a first prize.

In 2010, O'Rourke was selected to be featured in Jig. The documentary followed her preparation for the World Championships, that year held in Glasgow, Scotland, including competition at several other major competitions held by An Coimisiún Le Rincí Gaelacha around the world that year. O'Rourke won her first World Championship that year in her age group. As her career progressed, O'Rourke competed at three to five competitions outside the United States each year, usually including the All Ireland and All Scotland Championships.

In 2012, O'Rourke suffered a major back injury, which resulted in an unusually low placing of 24th at Oireachtas Rince na Cruinne 2013. She did not compete for some months, but trained intensively throughout 2013 and won a second world title in 2014. That year, Oireachtas Rince na Cruinne was held for the first time in England and O'Rourke featured on the BBC program Newsnight.

O'Rourke won further titles at Oireachtas Rince na Cruinne in 2015 and 2017. She announced her retirement in June of that year.

During her career, O'Rourke was described as an "ambassador" for Irish dance and as a symbol of the increased diversity and globalisation of the dance form. In 2017, shortly before her retirement, O'Rourke was named one of five "Top Irish dance influencers" by IrishCentral.

O'Rourke returned to Irish dance in 2022, winning as the Senior Ladies Oireachtas Champion, Mid Atlantic Division.

== Personal life ==
O'Rourke is the first of two children of father Kevin, originally from County Louth, Ireland, and Filipino mother Annelyn, both of whom are accountants.

She attended St. Agnes Cathedral School in Rockville Centre, New York and Sacred Heart Academy in Hempstead.

O'Rourke now began attending the University of Delaware in 2017 and has announced her intention to study physical therapy.
