= The Society for the Arts in Dementia Care =

Non-profit organization for Dementia patients' welfare

The Society for the Arts in Dementia Care is a non-profit organisation, with branches in Canada and Australia, dedicated to knowledge dissemination and education that focuses on improving the quality of lives of seniors living with dementia by using the visual and performing arts.

== Background ==
Founded in 2004, the head office is in Vancouver, British Columbia, Canada. In 2007, an affiliate chapter was created in Perth, Australia. The Society organizes annual conferences on Creative Expression, Communication and Dementia, commonly referred to as CECD Conferences. The Society for the Arts in Dementia Care is built on the premise that people living with dementia have the right to dignity, to be heard and to be valued. The Society provides an interdisciplinary forum for creative expression in dementia care, bringing together academic research and practical knowledge through collaboration between the medical profession and the creative arts. The Society aims to disseminate knowledge and establish ties with dementia care organisations worldwide, thereby improving the quality of life for people with dementia.

== Origins ==
The idea for The Society for the Arts in Dementia Care grew out of the experience of Dalia Gottlieb-Tanaka, who had developed a program of Creative Expression Activities in her work with seniors with dementia. As a PhD student at the Institute of Health Promotion Research, an Interdisciplinary Program at the University of British Columbia, she was eager to engage a wider audience of professionals and practitioners in exchanging ideas and strategies to address the problems of this population of seniors.

Early on, she arranged a successful exhibition of artwork that had been produced by the seniors with dementia she worked with; it took place at the Ferry Building Gallery in West Vancouver, BC, in 2003. More than 4,000 people visited the gallery over three weeks. The exhibition included seminars and workshops free of charge and was attended by healthcare providers, caregivers, seniors with dementia and the community at large. This event demonstrated that there was wide interest in the seniors' condition and curiosity about what kind of creative work the seniors could do.

== Conferences ==
The exhibition and related events served as a catalyst for conferences that Gottlieb-Tanaka organized at the University of British Columbia (UBC) in 2005 and 2006, the Society's first and second international CECD conferences respectively. The Conferences on Creative Expression, Communication and Dementia (CECD) introduced a new concept and new forum where anyone with an interest in dementia care and creative activities could come together to exchange ideas: academics, medical experts, researchers and caregivers responded enthusiastically.

An extension of the conferences is a permanent exhibition of artwork by seniors living with dementia, donated by the seniors themselves, their caregivers or the care facilities with the consent of either the senior's families or legal guardians.

In 2006, Hilary Lee of Perth, Australia, attended the CECD conference, making a presentation on her tapestry project. Lee immediately recognized the Society's value and volunteered to join forces with them, adopt the concept and set up a branch. A year later, the Society for the Arts in Dementia Care (Australia) was born.

In 2007, the Society was invited to exhibit its permanent art collection throughout the 4th Canadian Colloquium on Dementia in Vancouver, British Columbia. This was a conference of the medical establishment to discuss the latest research findings on dementia. The keynote speaker at this conference was Dr. Bruce Miller, a professor of Neurology and Psychiatry at the University of California at San Francisco (UCSF), who is known for his research on frontotemporal dementia and the link it has to creative abilities. Miller discussed that "a small but significant number of individuals develop a new interest and ability in art in the beginning stages of their illness."

In 2008, in partnership with the Institute of Neurosciences, Mental Health, and Addiction (CIHR, NMHA), the Society for the Arts in Dementia Care held its third international CECD conference at Emily Carr University in Vancouver. That year, the accompanying art exhibition was entitled Mindscapes 2008, successfully following a previous exhibition with a focus on mental illnesses and the Arts entitled Mindscapes 2004 in Ottawa, Ontario. It was at this conference that the Society successfully began the process of bridging the gap between the medical field and the creative arts, which is one of the aims of the Society. The Scientific Director at the Douglas Hospital Research Centre in Montreal, Dr. Remi Quirion, agrees and stated that "[i]n some ways, relationships are changing through dementia, so creative expression can help families find ways to reconnect. You can see the person on a piece of paper or in music or through another creative medium."

In 2009, the Australian affiliate chapter of the Society organized its fourth international CECD conference in Adelaide, Australia.

In 2010, the Canadian branch of the Society held its fifth international CECD conference on the theme of Health, Aging and the Creative Arts in Penticton, British Columbia. The Society has had a number of highly reputable speakers, contributors, and members affiliated with the organization. Dr. Asa Don Brown was one of the many notable speakers at this conference. Conference Brochure CECD

In November 2010, the Society was an exhibitor at the 2010 Vancouver ZoomerShow, a consumer trade show aimed for individuals over the age of 45 that took place at the Vancouver Convention Centre.

== Reasons for establishment and facts on aging in Canada ==
The aging population in Canada will peak between 2025 and 2045 when the Baby Boom generation reaches 75+ years of age. Significant pressure will be brought to bear on the healthcare system and on support services for older people. Long-term care facilities are expected to experience higher demand for their services. According to Health Canada, one of every four people over the age of 80 will have some form of cognitive impairment. These pressures may threaten the quality of services for seniors with dementia in the future.

Today, most services are geared to meeting basic needs, while existing quality of life programs, such as those based on creative self-expression, have never really reached their potential. The consensus among researchers is that creativity enhances the quality of life at every stage in human development from cradle to grave and that the idea of everyday creativity manifests itself in being curious, in an ongoing process of self-evaluation and personal growth. Accepting the premise that creativity improves psychological health and contributes to the empowerment process, the ultimate goal is to enable persons with dementia to maintain and enhance the quality of their lives and to use their remaining abilities to express themselves.

Although the literature is rich in empirical and anecdotal studies on memory, cognition, perception, dementia and dementia care, there is still a wide gap in information in connecting research to creativity, creative expression in people with dementia and the physical environment. The Society for the Arts in Dementia Care promotes the crossing of boundaries of physiological and psychological knowledge in dementia research into the everyday implementation of dementia care. As such, the Society aims to adjust creative expression activities to accommodate specific physical needs or abilities.

The Society for the Arts in Dementia Care encourages practitioners, including caregivers in areas of art therapy, creative expression, music therapy, and occupational therapy, to work closely with the scientific community and vice a versa. The Society believes that such an alliance is crucial in achieving appropriate creative expression interventions.

In addition to the medical description of lost abilities, the Society also feels that there is a need for detailed practical examples that are appropriately designed and conducted with seniors with dementia. The Society stresses the importance of taking the accumulated knowledge from research and practice and directly placing it into the community at large.

== Roles in Canada and in Australia ==
The Society aims:

- To advocate for and support people with dementia:
- To increase advocacy for people with dementia and their caregivers;
- To provide an interdisciplinary forum for where all can meet and share recent findings, practical experiences and collaborate on innovative approaches;
- To better understand dementia and how to cope with this condition using creativity;
- To promote dementia care in the community through creative expression activities;
- To reach out to practitioners, academics and members of the community at large who provide creative expression programs to seniors with dementia;
- To encourage artists to seek opportunities in therapeutic services and by doing so, enrich the pool of creative expression programs;
- To increase awareness among artists, caregivers and political leaders of the importance of creative expression activities in health care;
- To interact more with people with dementia to support their right to live in dignity;
- To maintain people with dementia longer at home and within their communities before admitting them to care facilities.

== Projects and research ==
The Society for the Arts in Dementia Care is frequently highlighted in The Canadian Review of Alzheimer's Disease and Other Dementias, while also being a continual provider of artwork featured on the journal's cover (artwork that is produced by a senior living with dementia).

In 2008, both the Canadian and Australian chairs of the Society, Gottlieb-Tanaka and Lee, teamed together with Dr. Peter Graf, a psychology professor at the University of British Columbia and a member of the Society's advisory board, to develop "an assessment tool to gauge the effects of participating in creative programs. The tool explores various areas in which individuals may best express themselves." The tool is currently being used in Canada. In Australia, the tool has been successfully implemented at Maurice Zefferet Home in Perth and it is also being utilized in the work and research of doctoral student Julie Gross McAdam, founder of MacArt: McAdam aged care art recreation therapy, in Melbourne.

The topic of creative expression and dementia is gaining interest in conferences, workshops, art exhibits and in research in the academic world. Presently, there is no known cure for this condition and the Society urges the medical model of dementia care to be reinforced with approaches that promote social and creative well-being. The work of the Society is of interest to researchers in gerontology and dementia, to the arts community, to creative expression facilitators, medical doctors, formal and informal caregivers. It also engages practitioners in the field of dementia care, administrators of care facilities, policy makers, families and the community at large.

== See also ==
- Art and dementia
- Caregiving and dementia
- I Remember Better When I Paint, a documentary about arts and dementia care.
