= The Universe of Keith Haring =

- Directed by: Christina Clausen
- Produced by: Paolo Bruno; Eric Ellena; Ian Ayres
- Release date: 2008

The Universe of Keith Haring is a 2008 documentary by the filmmaker Christina Clausen about the artist Keith Haring. In the film, the legacy of Haring is resurrected through colorful archival footage and remembered by friends and admirers such as artists Kenny Scharf and Yoko Ono, gallery owners Jeffrey Deitch and Tony Shafrazi. The film was produced by Paolo Bruno, Eric Ellena and Ian Ayres. The film was shown at the Tribeca Film Festival and has been released on DVD. Through interviews with collaborators and friends such as the choreographer Bill T. Jones, the film offers thoughtful reflection "on a man whose impulse, Jones says, 'was to do the work and live the life,' it is the passion and commitment we see in the artist himself that makes the most lasting impression."
