= The Jill & Tony Curtis Story =

- DVD cover
- Directed by: Ian Ayres
- Written by: Ian Ayres
- Produced by: Eric Ellena
- Starring: Aidan Black, Damoni Burkhardt, Jill Vandenberg Curtis, Tony Curtis, Bo Derek
- Cinematography: Jean-Thomas Renaud
- Edited by: Dinh Khoi Vu
- Music by: Jérôme Rossi
- Production company: French Connection Films
- Distributed by: French Connection Films
- Release date: 27 April 2008 (Paris)
- Running time: 73 minutes
- Country: France
- Language: English

The Jill & Tony Curtis Story, a 2008 feature-length documentary directed by Ian Ayres, is about Tony Curtis and his wife and their efforts to rescue horses from slaughterhouses. A camera crew follows Jill and Tony Curtis as they take in horses that would have been inhumanely killed and sent overseas as food for humans. The DVD of the documentary includes bonus features concerning such topics as Tony Curtis the artist, how Tony met Jill, and their love of horses.
