= Five Roads to Freedom: From Apartheid to the World Cup =

- Directed by: Robin Benger; Jane Thandi Lipman
- Country of origin: South Africa

Original release
- Release: 5 June 2010

Five Roads to Freedom: From Apartheid to the World Cup is a 2010 documentary film co-directed by Robin Benger and Jane Thandi Lipman that looks at South Africa's revolutionary transformation through the eyes of five men and women who lived under the shadow of apartheid.

The documentary focuses on five individuals from across the social and political spectrum: ordinary people whose experiences are representative of the profound changes of the past 15 years and whose lives in 2010 reflect both the promise and the ambiguities of today's South Africa.

Five Roads to Freedom is a deeply personal project for filmmaker Robin Benger. As a South African student leader in the late 1960s and early 1970s, he was arrested three times for anti-apartheid activities, and ultimately expelled from the country. The film is produced by Ian Ayres, Robin Benger, Eric Ellena, Jane Thandi Lipman, Joseph Oesi and Christopher Sumpton.
