= Music-evoked autobiographical memory =

Recollection of events triggered by musical stimulus

Music-evoked autobiographical memories (MEAMs) refer to the recollection of personal experiences or past events that are triggered when hearing music or some musical stimulus. While there is a degree of inter-individual variation in music listening patterns and evoked responses, MEAMs are generally triggered in response to a wide variety of music, often popular or classical genres, and are estimated to occur in the range from one to a few times per day, regardless of formal instrumental practice or music lessons. Consistent with the hallmarks of general autobiographical memories, everyday MEAMs similarly exhibit a recency effect, a reminiscence bump (later discussed in the section "The reminiscence bump"), and childhood amnesia, encoding autobiographical knowledge at several levels of specificity and across several common social and situational contexts. The phenomenon of MEAMs has been widely studied in the fields of psychology, neuroscience, and musicology. In recent years, the subject has garnered significant interest from researchers and the general public alike due to music's capacity to evoke vivid, emotional, and episodically rich autobiographical memories.

== History ==
The relationship between music and memory has long been recognized, with music's ability to elicit emotional responses and trigger memories dating back to ancient times. In ancient Graeco-Roman society, for instance, musical memory formed a fundamental part of social, cultural, and political life.

The scientific study of music's deep correlation with autobiographical memories gained prominence in the early 2000s, when the term "music-evoked autobiographical memory" was coined by cognitive neuroscientist Petr Janata and colleagues, who first described the phenomenon in healthy undergraduate students. At this time, Janata conducted a pioneering experiment in which his team developed a novel approach to studying autobiographical memory using a range of popular music. Analyses indicated that 30% of the presented songs evoked autobiographical memories, demonstrating the paradigm's efficacy and justifying its use in subsequent neuroimaging work.

Since Janata's work, numerous studies have contributed to the understanding of MEAMs. Researchers have investigated factors that influence the formation and retrieval of MEAMs, from the characteristics of the music stimulus to its personal relevance, with many contemporary studies citing his work.

== Recording techniques ==
=== fMRI ===
Functional magnetic resonance imaging (fMRI) serves as a neuroimaging technique which is used by researchers aim to identify the neural mechanisms underlying this experience and clarify the interplay between music, memory, and emotions.

In studies exploring MEAMs, participants are typically placed inside an MRI scanner while they listen to music that holds personal significance to them. The fMRI scanner measures the blood oxygen level-dependent (BOLD) signals, which provide an indirect measure of neural activity. Researchers analyze the fMRI data to identify brain regions that exhibit increased activity during MEAM retrieval compared to control conditions. These regions are believed to play crucial roles in memory processing, emotional responses, and self-referential processing.

Beyond fMRI measurements, studies on MEAMs often incorporate additional behavioral measures such as questionnaires or interviews to capture the subjective experience and vividness of the retrieved memories. These measures help validate the connection between music and autobiographical memories and provide a richer understanding of the phenomenon.

Since fMRI measures blood oxygenation level-dependent signals, this showcases an indirect line to neural activity, which can be seen as a limitation to this recording system.

=== EEG ===
Electroencephalography (EEG) has emerged as a valuable tool in the investigation of MEAMs. EEG allows researchers to examine the temporal dynamics of neural activity associated with MEAMs, providing insights into the underlying cognitive and emotional processes.

In studies focusing on MEAMs, participants wear a cap embedded with multiple electrodes that record electrical brain activity. EEG captures the millisecond-level fluctuations in neural oscillations, revealing the brain's real-time response to MEAMs. Researchers analyze the EEG data to identify specific patterns of brain activity, such as event-related potentials (ERPs) and oscillatory activity.

ERPs, derived from averaging the EEG signal time-locked to specific events, offer insights into the brain's response to musical stimuli. In MEAM research, researchers examine ERPs related to memory retrieval processes, such as the P300 component, which reflects attention allocation and memory updating. By comparing ERPs between music-evoked and control conditions, researchers gain insights into the neural mechanisms underlying MEAMs.

Oscillatory activity, as measured by EEG, provides further understanding of the neural dynamics during MEAMs. Researchers investigate changes in frequency bands, such as alpha, beta, and theta, associated with memory processes and emotional responses. For example, enhanced theta activity has been observed during successful memory retrieval, suggesting its involvement in encoding and recollection of music-evoked autobiographical memories.

EEGs have a hard time localizing the signals they receive from the brain which brings forth a limitation of being unable to capture information in a precise manner.

=== Deep learning architecture ===
Deep learning has also been a tool that is used to study MEAMs. Deep learning, a subset of machine learning, involves training neural networks with multiple layers to automatically learn and extract complex patterns from data. In the context of MEAMs, deep learning architectures are used to analyze and model the relationships between music and autobiographical memories, providing valuable insights into the underlying mechanisms.

Researchers employ deep learning architectures, such as convolutional neural networks (CNNs) and recurrent neural networks (RNNs), to process and analyze musical features and associated autobiographical memory data. CNNs excel at capturing spatial patterns and are commonly used to analyze spectrograms or other representations of music. By training CNNs on large datasets of music and associated memory information, researchers can uncover patterns and correlations that may be indicative of MEAMs.

RNNs, on the other hand, are specifically designed to model sequential data and are well-suited for analyzing the temporal aspects of music and memory. Researchers use RNNs to capture the dependencies and dynamics between musical elements and autobiographical memories. By training RNNs on sequences of music and associated memory descriptions, researchers can generate predictions and gain insights into the temporal dynamics of MEAMs.

Deep learning architectures in MEAM research are not limited to CNNs and RNNs alone. Variants such as long short-term memory (LSTM) networks and generative models, such as generative adversarial networks (GANs), are also employed. LSTM networks are capable of capturing long-range dependencies and are particularly useful when modeling the temporal aspects of music-evoked memories. GANs, on the other hand, can generate new music or memory samples based on learned patterns, allowing researchers to explore the generative aspects of MEAMs.

== Memory type ==
In general, musical memory can be split into both explicit and implicit memory systems. "Implicit" memory refers to the unconscious, automatic storage of information, encompassing procedural memories and motor skill learning. In the context of music, implicit memory accounts for the ability to play an instrument or sing a song without consciously bringing into memory how to play it. This differs from explicit memory, a declarative memory consisting of conscious recall of a specific piece of information. Explicit memory can be further split into episodic and semantic memory. Semantic memories are stored general knowledge and facts, accounting for a general sense of familiarity of music. In contrast, episodic memories are memory for the associated context of an event, accounting for the time, place, people, emotions, and personal experiences surrounding a musical experience. By these definitions, MEAMs are typically characterized as an explicit and episodic memory type. The distinct neural activation patterns associated with semantic vs episodic memories, as evidenced by a fMRI study looking into the neural correlates of music memory, helps explain some of the observed characteristics of MEAMs. This is further discussed in the next section "Brain regions involved".

== Brain regions involved ==
The act of listening to music elicits a wide range of neural responses and engages various cognitive processes, encompassing motor, auditory, emotional, memory, and reward-related functions within the brain. Processing of musical qualities in general such as timbre, tonality, and rhythm are associated with activation in temporal (superior and middle temporal gyri, insula), frontal (superior and middle frontal gyri, cingulate gyrus, precentral gyrus), parietal (inferior parietal gyrus, precuneus, postcentral gyrus), and cerebellar regions. In terms of forming and retrieving MEAMs specifically, the medial prefrontal cortex, encompassing both dorsal and ventral regions, emerges as a central hub. The dorsal MPFC responds to the autobiographical salience of music excerpts and tracks their movements through tonal space. This region exhibited a familiarity effect and showed properties of associating structural aspects of retrieval cues with episodic memories. Additionally, rostral and ventral aspects of the MPFC also exhibited responses related to familiarity, autobiographical salience, and positive valence.

The involvement of prefrontal regions in MEAMs was not limited to the MPFC. Both lateral and medial prefrontal areas showed responses, suggesting the usage of multiple memory retrieval processes to assemble semantic and episodic content into a recollective experience with an affective component. Also, the ventrolateral prefrontal cortex (VLPFC) has been implicated in processing musical structure, integrating musical events into syntactically coherent sequences.

== Retrieval mechanisms ==
=== Involuntary vs voluntary retrieval ===
MEAMs can occur in a variety of settings, both through deliberate and spontaneous recall. There has been some debate in the classification of MEAMs as voluntary or involuntary autobiographical memories. Voluntary autobiographical memories are "personal memories that follow a controlled, strategic retrieval process". Involuntary autobiographical memories are "memories of personal events that come to mind spontaneously-that is, with no conscious initiation of the retrieval process". They are considered to be more specific, retrieved significantly faster, and accompanied by a stronger emotional response than voluntary autobiographical memories.

Current research supports the idea that MEAMs aligns more often with the latter memory retrieval mechanism, as MEAMs are similarly more specific, retrieved faster, and are accompanied by greater emotional impact than memories retrieved in silence. A recent diary study also provides support, with a higher proportion of MEAMs being reported by participants to be involuntarily rather than deliberately retrieved. However, as 20% of participants in this study used deliberate recall, involuntary retrieval is not an exclusive feature of MEAMs.

=== Situational context ===
Involuntary memories of past events are context-sensitive, helping to explain the situational context in which MEAMs are most often evoked. Previous evidence demonstrates that involuntary memories are more likely to come back during cognitively undemanding activities, in which our mind is free to wander to thoughts about our past. These types of activities match almost perfectly with those recorded in a diary study, in which MEAMs typically occurred during routine tasks that were non-demanding on attention, such as driving, traveling, housework, and relaxing. This further introduces MEAMs as a form of music-evoked mind-wandering due to the similar type of tasks that are reported to accompany mind-wandering and daydreaming.

=== Memory reactivation through music ===
Eight psychological mechanisms have been proposed that explain how music elicits emotions. These mechanisms include brain stem reflex (arousal or surprise caused by sudden, loud, or dissonant sounds), rhythmic entrainment (increased arousal or social connectedness through synchronization with the music's rhythm), evaluative conditioning (associations formed between music and other stimuli), emotional contagion (induction of emotions expressed in the music), visual imagery (feelings of pleasure or deep relaxation evoked by mental imagery), evocation of episodic memories (MEAMs), aesthetic judgment (such as awe or wonder), and musical expectancy and predictions. Musical expectancies and predictions are particularly relevant as they not only evoke strong emotions but also play a central role in memory processing. When listening to music, expectations based on previous experiences regarding melody, harmony, and rhythm influence our emotional reactions, actions, and musical learning. These cognitive processes associated with music facilitate the retrieval of autobiographical memories.

Music can also evoke memories through specific individual associations. For example, certain songs become connected to specific events, life periods, or relationships. This effect is reinforced by the fact that people tend to revisit their preferred music more often than other cultural products. The likelihood of familiar music evoking memories may be attributed to its ability to activate an associative network of autobiographical memories, leading to spreading activation that facilitates memory retrieval.

Moreover, music plays a significant role in the formation of both social and personal identity. Certain music becomes strongly associated with essential aspects of an individual's identity and can enhance the retrieval of autobiographical memories through increased self-reference or by triggering specific memories that are central to one's identity.

== Autobiographical memory cues ==
Memory cues, or memory aids, are internal patterns of thinking or external stimuli that facilitate the retrieval of stored information. Memory cues have practical applications in various domains, including education, where they aid in processing complex information, as well as in rehabilitation programs to assist individuals with memory impairments. Thus, a primary goal in these efforts is choosing a cue that is memorable across various contexts.

=== Comparison of cues in healthy individuals ===
Music is particularly powerful in comparison to other autobiographical memory cues. Current research attests to its high saliency, with prior work indicating that MEAMs are more episodically rich and contain more perceptual details than face-evoked memories. An explanation for this observation may come from music's ability to evoke autobiographical memories in a more involuntary manner than other cues, which is described further in the previous section "Involuntary vs voluntary retrieval". MEAMs are also characterized by greater episodic detail, personal significance, social content, and positive emotional response in comparison to television-evoked autobiographical memories. In comparison to food-evoked cues, music evokes significantly more autobiographical memories and a greater proportion of involuntary memories.

=== Comparison of cues in individuals with memory dysfunction ===
There has been a large body of evidence comparing MEAMs to other cues in populations with impaired memory function. In studies with Alzheimer's patients, MEAMs were relatively preserved as opposed to picture-evoked memories, and autobiographical memories generated in silence. In comparison to this silent condition, MEAMs were found to be more self-defining, positive, and recall enhancing.

MEAMs are also believed to be a more effective memory cue than verbal prompts, as demonstrated by results from three patients with acquired brain injury. Recent work provides evidence that both music and photographs are effective cues for individuals with behavioral variant fronto-temporal dementia, while individuals with damage to the ventromedial prefrontal cortex may experience decreased episodic richness of MEAMs.

== Emotion ==
Through its unique ability to deeply resonate with emotions and evoke vivid recollections, music has been shown to significantly enhance the formation and retrieval of personal memories. While aesthetic responses to music can vary across cultures, there is a universal aspect to music-evoked emotions. In fact, the retrieval of MEAMs often leads to an emotional reaction. These emotions can be categorized along three dimensions: valence (unpleasant to pleasant), arousal (low to high), and intensity (weak to strong). A recent study explored the memories and emotions evoked when listening to musical pieces from one's past. Participants were presented with a large set of short musical excerpts, and among the songs that triggered autobiographical memories, the majority elicited strong positive emotions, such as nostalgia. These findings align with previous research, which indicates that recall is enhanced for positively valenced and arousing events. Positive emotions and high arousal levels strengthen the associations between memories, contributing to this memory-enhancing effect. Music has the ability to awaken, arouse, and evoke specific emotions, which in turn modulate and influence various cognitive functions.

Emotions can influence the strength and quantity of MEAMs in two ways. First, the emotional intensity during the formation of a memory can enhance its vividness and consolidation into long-term memory. Second, the emotional experience when listening to music can facilitate the retrieval of memories, especially when the music is associated with a specific emotional experience. In both cases, emotions play a vital role in strengthening the connection between music and memories. The causal relationship between music, emotions, and memories remains a topic of debate, as there may be a reciprocal influence where music triggers emotions that, in turn, activate memories.

== The reminiscence bump ==
The "reminiscence bump" effect, observed in autobiographical memory research, highlights the tendency for older individuals to recall and rate memories from adolescence and early adulthood as more vivid and important. Studies in the realm of music have revealed that songs released during an individual's 10-30-year age range are not only preferred but are also better recognized, evoking heightened emotional responses compared to songs from other periods. Additionally, there is some evidence suggesting that music from the reminiscence bump period may prompt the retrieval of more MEAMs. Furthermore, observations have been made among undergraduate students, where increased recognition, preference, and emotional responses have been observed for music from their parents' reminiscence bump period—a phenomenon referred to as "cascading reminiscence bumps".

== Practical applications ==
=== Alzheimer's Disease ===
Music-evoked autobiographical memories (MEAMs) have been shown to have great potential for addressing the emotional and cognitive deficits in Alzheimer's disease and other dementias. Studies assessing patient response to silence compared with music for the spontaneous recall of autobiographical memories have demonstrated that not only does music lead to improved memory recollection, but these memories tend to be associated with more positive emotions. A study by Cuddy et al. (2017) showed that MEAMs induced positive reminiscence in both Alzheimer's patients and elderly people, and music having lyrics or being preferred by the participants was not required. Merely pure, somewhat culturally familiar instrumental music was sufficient for MEAMs with a positive bias. This "positivity effect" may underscore the use of music therapy to improve the mood of Alzheimer's patients and reduce the frequency of anxiety and depression. In conjunction with reminiscence therapy, this may be a significant tool for the enhancement of wellbeing and sense of identity and self for Alzheimer's patients.

Music plays a direct role in modulating neural pathways to improve memory retrieval. Music can stimulate particular brain regions associated with the processing of memories, and overtime establish new pathways for autobiographical memory retrieval. It has been speculated that activation of the anterior hippocampus by music-evoked emotions and memories may stimulate neurogenesis and neuroplasticity to support the development of alternative pathways and decelerate atrophy of existing ones critical for memory processing and mood. As a result, Alzheimer's patients may show a reduction in memory retrieval time and improved overall performance in autobiographical memory assessments. One study, aiming to measure the effect of music compared with silence on the speed of memory retrieval, found that Alzheimer's patients in the "Music" condition improved their autobiographical memory performance significantly. They retrieved memories nearly twice as fast as subjects under the "Silence" conditions and the MEAMs were additionally more specific, emotional in nature, and had a greater influence on the participants' mood. Another study by El Haj et al. (2011) concluded that while recall was improved with music versus silence, chosen music had an even more strongly enhancing effect for the memory retrieval of Alzheimer's patients. Familiar music appears to better leverage the evocative power of music for individuals to recall early, emotionally charged memories (generally with a positive bias) and can serve as an outstanding tool for improving the cognitive functioning and mental well-being of Alzheimer's patients. Curating personalized playlists influenced by the patients' preferences may help induce powerful MEAMs to facilitate the development of memory retrieval pathways.

MEAMs may also improve the social interactions and communications of Alzheimer's patients. The sharing of memories, emotions, and music preferences with caregivers, family members, and friends may foster stronger connections for Alzheimer's patients. Similarly, group music therapy sessions can cultivate a supportive environment between Alzheimer's patients. This is believed to help develop a sense of positive reminiscence and overall well-being for the patients and encourage meaningful engagement with other people.

=== Mental health and depression ===
MEAMs can have a distinct effect on individuals who experience depression. The findings of a study by Sakka et al. (2020) indicate that depressed participants tend to rate their autobiographical memories evoked by music as more negative as opposed to healthy control participants. Though music is usually associated with being a pleasurable and positive activity, music can be a trigger for depressed individuals bringing back unpleasant experiences. These results have several implications when it comes to understanding depression. First, listening to music that evokes negative autobiographical memories can lead to negative health effects for depressed individuals. Second, these individuals may begin to avoid listening to music in general to avoid these negative memories. Last, the tendency of music to evoke negative memories may lead to the use of music for purposeful contemplation over negative experiences, which can be harmful for depressive individuals. These findings allow researchers to understand the ways in which music therapy can be leveraged for these individuals. For example, these findings can allow therapists to make suggestions on how patients can modify the manner in which they listen to music to evoke more positive memories and prevent negative, triggering ones. Using music as therapy for depressed individuals can have both a positive and negative effect. It can benefit these individuals by alleviating symptoms or create an even greater depressive state by triggering negative memories. Due to these findings, when using music as therapy, it appears important to make sure the chosen therapy has positive effects.

MEAMs can also have an effect on the mental health of healthy individuals not experiencing depression through the impact they have on emotion regulation and relationships between individuals. A study by Blais-Rochette et al. (2016) examines how various types of MEAMs can impact the way in which young people suppress or reprise emotions, perceive time, and internalize symptoms regarding their mental health. One notable finding of this study suggests that self-identifying with a MEAM predicts greater self esteem—when one still identifies with their remembered self specifically in a MEAM, they experience greater self esteem than other types of autobiographical memories. The implication of this finding is that music specifically provides an opportunity for the creation of a positive self identity. Another significant finding suggests that the sharing of MEAMs within relationships creates positive emotions and strengthens relationships. This social sharing can lead to an overall greater sense of happiness. Lastly, it is also important to consider that those who tend to scrutinize over the coherence of MEAMs tend to experience more negative emotions. Overall, the experience of MEAMs can encourage social sharing which, in turn, can result in overall happiness and better mental health.

=== Music therapy ===
Music has been shown to have various therapeutic effects. The Neuroscience of Music suggests that involving music in therapy can help children with anxiety, trouble focusing, coping with pain, cancer, and even autism. MEAMs can also be utilized in therapy to benefit all individuals, including those suffering from Alzheimer's, dementia, and mental health related issues. Various studies have demonstrated the benefits of using MEAMs in therapy. For example, a study by Jakubowski et al. 2022 demonstrates how music tends to evoke positive memories despite the valance of the song. Even songs that are negative in valance can bring back positive memories. Researchers suggest these findings can have implications in music therapy as a powerful memory cue. Additionally, as suggested by Jakubowski et al. 2021, these associations between music and autobiographical memories can be utilized in therapeutic practices in order to help people regulate their emotions as well as maintain their sense of self.

=== Effect on relationships ===
MEAMs can play a role in romantic relationships, specifically the way in which couples tend to link songs to their relationships. A study by Harris et al. (2020) investigated the phenomenon in which couples identify their relationship through a certain song. The findings of this study indicate that chosen songs are generally associated with positive emotions and memories. These results support current research on MEAMs, demonstrating music's abilities to elicit strong memories. The shared experience that these defining songs provide may have various beneficial impacts on a couple's relationship, including greater intimacy.
