= Jig (film) =

- Theatrical release poster
- Directed by: Sue Bourne
- Produced by: Sue Bourne
- Cinematography: Joe Russell
- Edited by: Colin Monie
- Music by: Patrick Doyle
- Production companies: BBC Scotland; Creative Scotland; Head Gear Films
- Distributed by: Screen Media Films
- Release dates: 1 May 2011 (Hot Docs); 6 June 2011 (United Kingdom)
- Running time: 99 minutes
- Country: United Kingdom
- Language: English
- Box office: £194,515

Jig is a 2011 documentary produced and directed by Sue Bourne about the world of Irish dance and the fortieth Irish Dancing World Championships, held in March 2010 in Glasgow.

== Production ==
Bourne first proposed the film to BBC Scotland commissioning editor Ewan Angus in 2009 after hearing that the 40th World Championships were to be held in Glasgow. After realising further funding would be required, Bourne negotiated a deal with Creative Scotland and the BBC which secured a short theatrical release for the project followed by reversion of the TV rights to BBC2.

Bourne approached An Coimisiún Le Rincí Gaelacha (the Irish Dancing Commission) in late 2009. Her proposal to film a documentary was met with skepticism, largely because the Commission does not permit filming of competitions in order to protect the original choreography of the dances. A meeting of the Commission's 100 members eventually agreed to the project on the grounds of Bourne's previous work and the potential publicity benefits of the film.

Filming began in January 2010 with a crew of three, but Bourne used a crew of 20 during the nine days of the Championships themselves. In order to ensure copyright compliance, Bourne commissioned a suite of dance music from two Irish musicians, which was specially licensed for use in the film's rehearsal scenes. The film was subject to an 18-week edit which tailored Bourne's television style to cinematic release. The film was released in 50 UK cinemas on 6 May 2011 by distributor Arrow Films.

== Synopsis ==
The film follows eight dancers from across the world as they prepare for and compete at Oireachtas Rince Na Cruinne (the Irish Dancing World Championships), held in Glasgow in 2010 by An Coimisiún Le Rincí Gaelacha. One dancer, Julia O'Rourke, wins her first world title in the course of the documentary.

== Soundtrack ==
The score for Jig was written by Academy Award-nominated Scottish composer Patrick Doyle. The soundtrack was released through Varèse Sarabande 12 July 2011.

== Release ==
Jig premiered at the Hot Docs Canadian International Documentary Festival on 1 May 2011 with 2 screenings. It then opened on 6 May in a short limited release across 50 cinemas in the United Kingdom.

The film opened in 5 theatres in New York City, Toronto, Chicago, Los Angeles and Boston on the weekend of 17–19 June, with an opening weekend gross of US$70,432. The screenings were largely attended by Irish dancers and their families.

Jig made its broadcast premiere on 1 September 2011 on BBC Two, subtitled as The Great Irish Dance-Off.

== Reception ==
=== Critical reception ===
The film received a mixed reception from critics. It currently holds a 61% rating on Rotten Tomatoes and a score of 53/100 based on fourteen reviews on Metacritic.

Gary Goldstein of the Los Angeles Times praised the film for capturing "the unique physical, emotional and financial aspects of diving into competitive Irish dance", calling Bourne's documentary "superbly crafted" and giving it four stars out of five. Mark Feeney, for the Boston Globe, wrote that the "involving, if at times overly slick" film deserved praise for its presentation of the dancing without "editing trickery". Benji Wilson, in The Telegraph, compared Jig to successful sport and hobby documentaries Spellbound and Hoop Dreams for its attention to detail.

However, many reviewers criticised the film's use of tension, such as Jeanette Catsoulis of the New York Times, who wrote that the "programmatic" documentary quickly became "leaden", despite the quality of its cinematography. Empire's Anna Smith wrote that the film was probably most interesting to "dance fans".

=== Accolades ===
Jig was nominated for the 2011 British Academy Scotland Awards in the Best Single Documentary category, and for the 2012 Golden Trailer Awards in the Best Foreign Documentary Trailer category. Its soundtrack was nominated for the 2011 International Film Music Critics Awards for Best Original Score for a Documentary Feature
