= Pangaia (company) =

Fashion company

Pangaia is a fashion and materials science company founded in 2018. It sells athleisure, wardrobe materials and graphic T-shirts. The company operates globally, with research and development of sustainable materials taking place in Florence, Italy. In 2025 Pangaia named former Inditex director Daniel Gómez Rojas as its CEO.

== History ==
Pangaia originated from Future Tech Lab, an incubator focused on material innovation founded by Miroslava Duma. Duma, initially a fashion influencer, transitioned into venture capital and played a key role in developing technologies and brands focused on sustainability and materials science. The brand rose to prominence during the COVID-19 pandemic, supported by high-profile figures including Will Smith, Jaden Smith, Carmen Busquets, and Leonardo DiCaprio.

In 2021, Pangaia acquired the business branches of the Italian companies Grado Zero Espace and Grado Zero Innovation, both pioneers in technical textiles and advanced insulation materials. Following this, it established the R&D subsidiary Pangaia Grado Zero Srl, based in Florence. One of the key technologies involved in the acquisition was FLWRDWN™, a patented vegan thermal insulation made from wildflowers, biopolymers and cellulose-based aerogel. Originally developed by Grado Zero Innovation, the IP was sold to Pangaia through Future Tech Lab and became central to its bio-material portfolio.

In July 2025, Pangaia Grado Zero Srl officially changed its name to Grado Zero Lab, continuing independently as a research-focused company specializing in sustainable materials, wearable technology, and bio-innovation.

In 2022, Pangaia reported significant net losses. In 2023, the company underwent restructuring, closing its Dutch warehouse and laying off approximately one third of its workforce.

CEO Krishna Nikhil stepped down in December 2023 after 18 months, succeeded by co-founder Nathalie Longuet, who remains CEO as of 2025.

In January 2025, the Abu Dhabi-based Royal Group acquired a controlling stake in Pangaia, aiming to support its global expansion and innovation strategy.

The brand operated in the UK under multiple entities. The original company, Pangaia Ltd (company no. 10889433), was voluntarily dissolved in 2023. Operations continued under Pangaia Materials Science Limited (company no. 12213319), based in London.

In 2024, Pangaia opened its first UK flagship store at 57 Carnaby Street, Soho, London. The 1,500 sq ft location functions as both retail space and educational hub.

== Collaborations ==
Pangaia has collaborated with artists, fashion brands, and sustainable material innovators such as Timberland, Takashi Murakami, Ambush, Alexander Wang, The Woolmark Company, Evrnu, and Kenny Scharf. Other notable partners include Polestar, Headspace, Wagamama, Costa Brazil, Coral Gardeners, and Hyosung.
