= Gene D. Cohen =

American psychiatrist (1944–2009)

Gene D. Cohen (1944–2009) was an American psychiatrist who pioneered research into geriatric mental health. He was the first head of the Center on Aging at the National Institute of Mental Health, the first government-supported center on mental health and aging in the world, and was later the first director of the Center on Aging, Health, and the Humanities at the George Washington University.

== Early life and education ==
Cohen was born on September 28, 1944, in Brockton, Massachusetts, where he showed a predilection for science at an early age. He attended Harvard College as an undergraduate, earning his degree in 1966, and four years later graduated from the Georgetown University School of Medicine.

== Career ==
Cohen worked for a time in the United States Public Health Service before becoming the founding Director of the Center on Aging at the National Institute of Mental Health in 1975. In 1981, he earned a Doctorate in Gerontology at the Union Institute and University. He went on to serve as Acting Director of the National Institute on Aging at the National Institutes of Health from 1991 to 1993 and found the Center on Aging, Health, and the Humanities at the George Washington University in 1994.

Cohen was a dedicated advocate of the idea that the aged are capable of functioning at high levels of creativity and intellectual rigor. When his career began, the medical profession largely treated aging like a disease, but Cohen argued based on his research that the brain would continue creating new cells at any age so long as it was engaged in new and challenging intellectual activities. His work in a number of studies on aging supported this belief, including a 2002 study which suggested that involvement in the arts late in life led to a lower incidence of illness and injury. According to Dr. Walter Reich, a colleague at George Washington University, "Single-handedly he changed the image of aging from one of senescence to a period of creativity."

Cohen was a prolific writer. His theories and research were published in a multitude of books, three of which he was the sole author and more than 150 others which he co-wrote or edited. Among his other contributions to his field, he helped found two journals on geriatric psychiatry, served as president of the Gerontological Society of America, and appeared on television programs as an expert on aging and with George Burns in Public Service Announcements. He also developed a number of therapeutic activities, including intergenerational games. Two of his creations were patented, a combination of chess and Scrabble called World War Three and a variation of cribbage. He is featured in the 2009 documentary film on Alzheimer's and the creative arts I Remember Better When I Paint.

Cohen died at 65 of prostate cancer on November 7, 2009, in Kensington, Maryland. He had two children, Alex Cohen and Eliana Miller-Cohen."
