= Hilda Goldblatt Gorenstein =

American painter

Hilda Goldblatt Gorenstein (1905–1998) was an American oil painter and watercolorist. A native of Montreal, Canada, who grew up in Portland, Oregon, U.S. Gorenstein started painting as a teenager at a time when women artists weren't very well received. A reflection of the times in which she lived, she signed her work "Hilgos", an androgynous professional working name. She was later the inspiration for the documentary film, I Remember Better When I Paint.

== Career ==
A graduate of the School of the Art Institute of Chicago in the early 1930s, she produced more than 1,500 artworks in about 70 years including paintings in oil and acrylic, watercolors, drawings and sculpture. Hilgos's pieces have been exhibited in cities across the United States and her artwork is part of private collections in the U.S. and abroad.

She was a marine artist who was selected to paint twelve murals for the U.S. Navy's exhibit in the Federal Building for the 1933–1934 International Exhibition Century of Progress, a World's Fair held in Chicago. Her frieze was composed of twelve murals depicting the influence of sea power on America, beginning with the settlement of Jamestown in 1607 when sea power first reached America and carrying through World War I.

== Later years ==
In her later years while struggling with Alzheimer's, she stated "I remember better when I paint". With students from the Art Institute of Chicago facilitating, Hilgos began painting again. Painting allowed Hilgos to maintain, and even regain, some of her core identity, and her extraordinary enthusiasm and energy, in the face of her affliction. Many of these late-in-life pictures, most of which are watercolors, are exceptional. Her daughter, Berna Huebner, has written a book based on Hilgos describing how some people affected with dementia can be reconnected to themselves and their pasts with the help of art students who work with them in creating art. The Hilgos Foundation, a non-profit organization that supports the artistic creation for people who have Alzheimer's was founded in her memory.

== Film ==
An international documentary film, I Remember Better When I Paint, inspired by Hilgos, focuses on how the creative arts can help Alzheimer's patients re-engage in life, not only through creation and performance of art and music but also from exposure to the arts around the world, such as the Louvre museum. It also shares findings by leading neurologists offering scientific support regarding the transforming power of the arts for Alzheimer's victims. The film includes an emotional interview with Yasmin Aga Khan, movie star Rita Hayworth‘s daughter; Hayworth developed early-onset Alzheimer's and also painted.

A French version of the film Je me souviens mieux quand je peins was released in September 2009 as part of the French Alzheimer Association's activities on World Alzheimer's Day. The film is co-directed by Berna Huebner and Eric Ellena. Extracts from the documentary were featured on the France 2 Telematin television program.
