= Éric Elléna =

French filmmaker

- With Ian Ayres at Yoko Ono's 2009 exhibition at the MMFA.
- Occupation: Filmmaker

Eric Elléna is a French filmmaker.

== Career ==
As a director his films include The Last Trackers of the Outback, which won the Public's Choice Award at the 2008 FIFO Pacific International Documentary Film Festival in Tahiti and The Long March of Bob Slaughter.

In 2000, his script Drugstore was one of 24 scripts selected from a regional French competition of 3,600 entries to be produced as a short film. His script was directed by Marion Vernoux and actress Valeria Bruni-Tedeschi played the lead role. The 24 films were then shown at the Cannes Film Festival as part of an anti-drug awareness raising campaign Drug Scenes (Original French title:Scénarios sur la Drogue).

He was a producer on The Universe of Keith Haring, a documentary by the filmmaker Christina Clausen. In the film, the legacy of Keith Haring is resurrected through colorful archival footage and remembered by friends and admirers such as artists Kenny Scharf and Yoko Ono, gallery owners Jeffrey Deitch and Tony Shafrazi, and the choreographer Bill T. Jones.

For The Jill & Tony Curtis Story, he served as an executive producer and as a co-producer on Tony Curtis: Driven to Stardom.

He is co-director of the documentary I Remember Better When I Paint. The film, inspired by the story of Hilda Goldblatt Gorenstein (Hilgos), focuses on how the creative arts can help Alzheimer's patients re-engage in life. A French version of the film "Je me souviens mieux quand je peins" was released as part of the French Alzheimer Association's activities on World Alzheimer's Day in September 2009. Extracts from "Je me souviens mieux quand je peins" were featured on France 2 television and screened for the International Health Film Festival in Belgium.

He is a producer on Five Roads to Freedom: From Apartheid to the World Cup a documentary released in 2010 that looks at the revolutionary transformation in South Africa through the eyes of five men and women who lived under the shadow of apartheid.
