= Ian Ayres (filmmaker) =

American filmmaker

Ian Ayres is an American filmmaker, singer, dancer, poet, and philosopher.

== Career ==
As a director his films include the 2008 documentary The Jill & Tony Curtis Story, which was selected for screening at the Bel Air Film Festival, the Montreal World Film Festival, and the Mammoth Film Festival. It concerns the efforts of Tony Curtis and his wife to rescue horses from slaughterhouses. He is also the director of Tony Curtis: Driven to Stardom a documentary which traces the personal and professional history of the actor. In 2022, a documentary directed by Ayres on Marilyn Monroe, called Dream Girl: The Making of Marilyn Monroe, was released. It was previously announced in 2010.

As a producer, his credits include The Universe of Keith Haring, a 2008 documentary by Christina Clausen about Keith Haring, which includes colorful archival footage and interviews with Kenny Scharf and Yoko Ono, gallery owner Tony Shafrazi, and the choreographer Bill T. Jones. It was screened at the Tribeca Film Festival, as well as Five Roads to Freedom: From Apartheid to the World Cup, a 2010 documentary that looks at the revolutionary transformation in South Africa through the eyes of five men and women who lived under the shadow of apartheid.
