= Kenny Scharf =

American artist (born 1958)

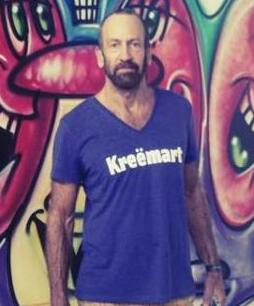
- Scharf in 2012
- Born: Kenneth Paul Scharf; November 23, 1958 (age 67); Los Angeles, California, U.S.
- Education: School of Visual Arts
- Known for: Painting
- Notable work: Bowery Mural

Kenneth Paul Scharf (born November 23, 1958) is an American painter known for his participation in New York City's interdisciplinary East Village art scene during the 1980s, alongside Jean-Michel Basquiat and Keith Haring. Scharf's do-it-yourself practice spanned painting, sculpture, fashion, video, performance art, and street art. Growing up in post-World War II Southern California, Scharf was fascinated by television and the futuristic promise of modern design. His works often include pop culture icons, such as the Flintstones and the Jetsons, or caricatures of middle-class Americans in an apocalyptic science fiction setting.

== Life and career ==
Born in Los Angeles, Scharf moved to Manhattan, earning a BFA in painting at the School of Visual Arts in 1980. In the East Village of the 1980s, Scharf began his trademark Cosmic Caverns, immersive black light and Day-Glo paint installations that also function as ongoing disco parties. The first was known as the "Cosmic Closet" and was installed in 1981 in the Times Square apartment he shared with Keith Haring. They exhibited a six-minute video called "The Sparkle End" (1980) in the landmark 1980 Collaborative Projects exhibition The Times Square Show. In 1982, Scharf participated in the group show Space Invaders at New York's P.S.1.

In 1983, Scharf married Tereza Goncalves after they met during a trip to Brazil. They purchased a beachfront home in Bahia and split their time between Brazil and New York, where Scharf has a loft on Great Jones Street in NoHo. In 1984, they had their first child, Zena, and their second daughter Malia was born in 1988.

During this period, Scharf also had important shows at Fun Gallery (1981) and Tony Shafrazi (1983, 1984, 1985), before seeing his work embraced by museums, such as the Whitney, which selected him for the 1985 Whitney Biennial. Art scribe Demetria Daniels writing in Downtown Magazine said about his work that it... "leaves you with hope, joy, play and optimism, and a sense of love...."

From then his career took off and he had international exhibitions such as with Galerie Bruno Bischofberger, Zurich (1985) and the Akira Ikeda Gallery, Tokyo (1986, 1988). In 1987, Scharf designed a swing carousel for André Heller's Luna Luna, an ephemeral amusement park in Hamburg with rides designed by renowned contemporary artists.

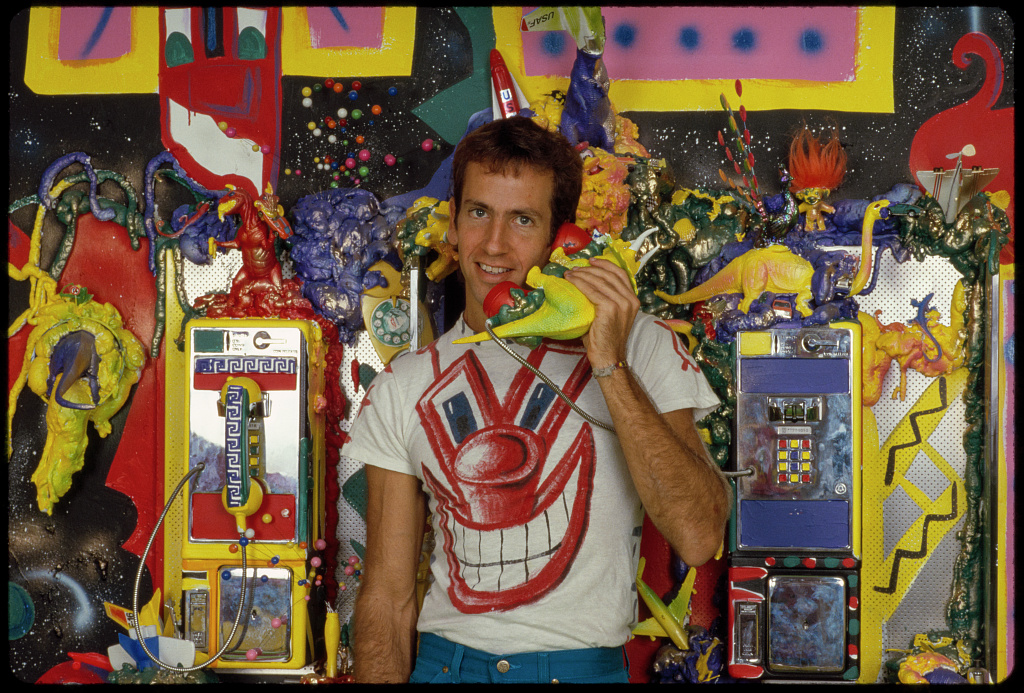
Scharf in 1985

In 1994, Scharf opened The Scharf Shop in South Beach, Florida. The boutique, which sold merchandise decorated with his art, was managed by his wife Tereza.

In 1996, Scharf designed a room called the Cosmic Cavern at the Tunnel nightclub in Chelsea. This expanded to a website called Total Cosmic Cavern," which had a chatroom and users could choose an avatar to explore Scharf Galaxy where each planet was based on one of his paintings.

After seven years of living in Miami, Scharf and his family moved to Culver City, California in 1999.

In 2015/2016 Scharf had a one-person exhibition at the Hammer Museum. And, in 2017, he mounted "BLOX and BAX", his latest one-person exhibition at Honor Fraser Gallery in Los Angeles (his fifth with the gallery). Also in 2017 his work was featured in the large group exhibition "Fast Forward: Painting From the 1980s" at the Whitney Museum. Scharf's work was included in the October 2017 exhibition "Club 57: Film, Performance, and Art in the East Village, 1978–1983" at the Museum of Modern Art in New York.

Scharf's work is included in public collections such as the Bass Museum of Art, Miami Beach, FL; The Jewish Museum, New York, NY; Ludwig Museum, Cologne, Germany; Museo de Arte Contemporáneo, Monterrey, Mexico; Museu de Arte Moderna, Rio de Janeiro, Brazil; Museum of Contemporary Art, Los Angeles, CA; Museum of Modern Art, New York, NY; San Francisco Museum of Modern Art, San Francisco, CA; Sogetsu Museum, Tokyo, Japan; Stedelijk Museum, Amsterdam, the Netherlands; and the Whitney Museum of American Art, New York, NY.

Scharf is known for welcoming collaborations with popular culture and merchandising opportunities. He designed the cover art for the 1986 B-52's album Bouncing Off the Satellites and created the 2002 pilot for The Groovenians for Adult Swim on the Cartoon Network. He has appeared in the documentaries The Universe of Keith Haring and The Nomi Song, about his friend, opera singer Klaus Nomi, as well as 2016's Kenny Scharf's World: ART/New York No. 69 by Paul Tschinkel. In 2014, he also collaborated on an accessories line with art consultant Maria Gabriela Brito. 2020 Dior luxury fashion house presents a new collection in partnership with Kenny Scharf. Scharf collaborated with PANGAIA in 2024.

The documentary Kenny Scharf: When Worlds Collide, was released in 2020. It was directed by Max Basch and Malia Scharf.

== Solo exhibitions ==
1981

- National Studio Artists, P.S. 1, Long Island City, NY
- The Jetsons, Fun Gallery, New York, NY
- Customized Appliances, Club 57, New York, NY

1979

- Paintings at Fiorucci, Fiorucci, New York, NY
- Celebration of the Space Age, Club 57, New York, NY
