= Music therapy for Alzheimer's disease =

Therapy treatment for Alzheimer's disease

For patients with Alzheimer's disease, music therapy provides a beneficial interaction between a patient and an individualized musical regimen and has been shown to increase cognition and slow the deterioration of memory loss. Music therapy is a clinical and evidence-based intervention that involves music in some capacity and includes both a participant and a music therapist who has completed an accredited music therapy program and achieved credential requirements from an accredited certification entity such as the Certification Board for Music Therapists.

The forms of music therapy are broad in nature and can range from individual or group singing sessions, to active participation in music making, to listening to songs individually. Alzheimer's disease (AD) is a fatal condition that continuously deteriorates brain chemistry over time. Accounting for more than 60% of the dementia in older people, AD gradually leads to detrimental effects on cognitive function, linguistic abilities, and memory. Within populations living with Alzheimer's, music therapy is sometimes used to assist in palliating the behavioral and psychological symptoms of this disease. Music therapy is based in scientific findings and can elicit change in individuals as well as groups through music. Personalized music therapy has been shown in some cases to be able to lessen certain symptoms, including behavioral symptoms, such as physical or verbal outbursts and hallucinations, and cognitive symptoms related to dementia.

This personalized treatment approach has also been utilized in music therapy which, in comparison to pharmacological treatments, is a very low-cost solution to help manage aspects of the disease throughout the progression of the disease. It is also a preferable way of additional treatment over medications for behavioral symptoms (e.g., antidepressants) for reducing or avoiding side effects. Because of the recognized decreases in behavioral outbursts, music therapy has been recognized as a type of care that is beneficial to the patient as well as the caretaker. However, the effects of music therapy on individuals with Alzheimer's disease may be short-term according to one source, lasting a maximum of three months after the discontinuation of treatment.

== Recent research ==
Currently, there is no known cure for Alzheimer's disease, though a range of medications and alternative therapy options have shown to be effective in mitigating the progression of the disease. Medication-based treatments such as the use of low dose Leuco-Methyltioninium (LMTM) were shown to be most effective at higher doses of around 100 mg daily; unfortunately, these higher doses were shown to cause severe gastrointestinal and urinary reactions. Due to the physiologically destructive nature of Alzheimer's disease, many medications that are able to slow physical deteriorations also offer many unwanted side effects because of their harsh nature. While cognitive interventions such as the use of primarily computer-based training programs have shown high efficacy in improving delayed memory, recognition, clock-drawing, digit forward and digit backward tests, these programs can be expensive and present learning barriers to the senior populations who prefer the traditional pencil-and-paper methods. Aside from medication and cognition based treatments, music therapy offers a cheaper intervention that reduces the stress and side effects associated with other treatment options.

Music therapy has been studied in the psychological community and has been found to be effective in reducing behavioral symptoms as well as positively influencing emotional and cognitive well-being. In one study, Alzheimer's patients in 98 nursing homes were exposed to music therapy and the results were compared to 98 controls that were not exposed to music therapy. The results suggested that this program helped reduce the use of medication, in combination with the reduction of behavioral and physiological symptoms of dementia. This is the first empirical study to show that the Music and Memory program, described below, exhibits efficacy in reducing antipsychotic and anxiolytic medicine use behavioral and psychological symptoms of dementia. Additionally, another study found that music therapy demonstrated sedative and relaxing effects on patients. Certain neurotransmitter levels, such as for norepinephrine and epinephrine, significantly increased after four weeks of music therapy. Music therapy has also been found to help slow down deterioration of linguistic ability.

Similarly, a study was conducted that had Alzheimer's patients in nursing home facilities assigned to one of three activities: play puzzles, paint, or listen to music from the patients' youth. When tested six months later, those who listened to music were more alert and in better moods and had greater recall of their own personal events when compared to the groups who painted or played with puzzles.

Research has even suggested that Alzheimer's patients may be capable of learning entirely new music. Alzheimer's patients were taught an original song by a group leader and over the course of three sessions, there was visible improvements and increased alertness among Alzheimer's patients. Alzheimer's patients have experienced growth in alertness, as well as, the remarkable retrieval of memories that they attach to whatever song they are being exposed to. Music makes physical and emotional connections that trigger memories that wouldn't have otherwise been retrieved if it weren't for the rhythm, melody, and melodic phrasing of the given musical piece; in many cases, music has been said to be one of the last things that an Alzheimer's patient forgets how to do (usually attributed to muscle memory). Learning new songs was possible. Additionally, another study found similar results and found that Alzheimer's patients when prompted could remember new songs and tunes that were taught to them. They found that with regular practice, Alzheimer's patients could, in fact, learn new music.

Additionally, a qualitative study summarized 21 studies conducted since 1985 on those with Alzheimer's disease and the effect of music therapy. These studies varied in nature, but the authors concluded that music therapy can be a successful intervention and can improve both cognitive and emotional behaviors, as well as decrease some of the behavioral issues associated with Alzheimer's disease. While the methods were varied in nature, the converging evidence in the various experiments lend optimism for the validity of music therapy in this subset of the population.

One dissertation published in 2021 included 43 elderly female Americans in 3 East coast rehabilitation centers for dementia who went through a 5-week individualized singing intervention. The results of the study highlight the importance of individualization when it comes to music-based interventions (MBIs) and dementia, as high participation individuals showed much greater cognitive, functional, and narrative improvements than those that participated less. The individualized selection of familiar, nostalgic, and new songs combined with a personalized tonal key and rhythm that best fit the patient's vocal and physical abilities was vital to realizing these improvements.

=== Constraints with research ===
However, some of the current research does not support the fact that all musical memory is preserved in patients with Alzheimer's disease. A paper reviewing eight case studies and three group studies, found that certain kinds of musical memory, such as remembering familiar music from one's youth, might not be preserved. However, of the Alzheimer's patients that were musicians, greater retention of musical memory was preserved compared to those without prior musical experience. This research suggests that music therapy may not be effective in the same capacity for every patient affected by Alzheimer's disease, and that differences may be highly variable in nature. While it is logical that treatment works on a case-by-case basis, it is important to remember that individuals react differently to any treatment, and results vary. This study also highlights that there are huge methodological differences in the different kinds of studies, providing difficulty for synthesizing across information and study designs. This research highlights an important understanding with these studies, since most of them lack a control group so drawing causal conclusions becomes impossible. A more recent review of music training-induced neuroplasticity marks the inconsistencies as a result of varying study designs and between-subject comparisons, emphasizing the importance of longitudinal within-subject designs for future research.

=== Future Research ===
Recently, new combinations of MBIs with other noninvasive methods have been proposed to bolster the efficacy of treatment. One such proposal published in 2020 presented a new clinical framework of combining MBIs with more recent Gamma-frequency sensory stimulation approaches as to noninvasively treat neurodegenerative disorders. They suggest that such a combination could enhance MBIs through the targeting of multiple biomarkers of dementia while activating auditory-reward networks. They suggest that such interventions would be most effective at the mild cognitive impairment (MCI) stage for slowing/reversing cognitive decline, as the resting-state connectivity of auditory and reward systems in the brain have been shown to be heightened in MCI patients compared to AD and even healthy control patients.

== Efficiacy ==
Music programs in general have been newly investigated as a more formal and structured way to alleviate cognitive impairments associated with Alzheimer's disease and other related dementias. Providing five sessions of music-based therapy has been found to generally improve behavioral problems, reduce anxiety, and enhance the emotional well-being. In contrast, however, no clear evidence about music's effect on aggression or agitation was observed.

Music influences many regions of the brain including those associated with emotional and creative areas. Because of this, music has the power to evoke emotion and memories from deep in the past, so it is logical that Alzheimer's patients have the ability to recall musical memories from many decades prior given the richness and vividness of these memories. Music memory can be preserved for those living with Alzheimer's disease and brought forth through various techniques of music therapy. Initial research has suggested that reminiscence music can be associated with daily tasks to aid in their successful completion and reduce the burden on caregivers. Areas of the brain that are influenced by music are one of the last regions to degenerate due to the progression of Alzheimer's disease.

Music therapy has a positive effect on immediate and delayed word recall in mild AD patients. In a clinical setting, short and long-lasting stimulations by music were shown to have a positive effect on both category fluency in verbal tasks as well as fluency and speech content. Music therapy was also found to be effective in controlling the psychiatric and behavioral side-effects of AD, causing a decrease in caregiver distress as well as an increase in quality of life.

Alzheimer's patients can often remember songs from their youth even when far along in the progression of their disease. Dementia facilities the use music as a means of entertainment, since it often brings joy and elicits memories. Alive Inside describes that music activates more parts of the brain than any other stimulus and records itself in our motions and emotions. The movie describes that these are the last parts of the brain touched by Alzheimer's.

Music therapists have the capability to develop relationships and bonds with their patients, especially through repeated sessions. Music can help with an adjustment toward unfamiliar environments as well as settings that trigger memories from deep in the past. These sessions can often lead to uncontrollable emotions, as evidenced in the patients Dan Cohen describes and highlights in nursing homes in Alive Inside. One patient documented in Alive Inside had used a walker for many years, and while listening to a song from her youth was able to dance without the use of her walker.

== Popular Media ==
Alzheimer's Disease has been discussed in popular media outlets. The 2014 film Alive Inside follows patients with Alzheimer's disease and demonstrates how music can be used as a means for music therapy to alleviate some suffering and pain. This film highlights the impact that music can have on those who can not communicate in traditional ways, and the power that music can play, particularly that from one's youth. Alive Inside won the Audience Award for U.S. Documentaries, which was screened at the Sundance Film Festival. In response to the film, the Alive Inside Foundation, founded in 2010, rose in popularity. The foundation's motto is the "Empathy Revolution" and aims to connect youth and older adults with Alzheimer's disease, specifically through music. The goal of the foundation is to administer music via the form of iPods to every nursing home across the United States.

Additionally, The Alzheimer's Association gives a list of caregivers tips for people with Alzheimer's relatives and friends. They state that music therapy has been found to enhance cognition and can help caregivers better take care of those affected by Alzheimer's.
