= Sue Bourne =

Scottish television documentary producer and director

Susan Bourne
- Born: London, England
- Education: University of Edinburgh
- Occupation: Documentary Producer / Director
- Organization: Wellpark Productions
- Known for: Producer/ Director of many award-winning & highly acclaimed films:- "My Street" "Mum and Me" "Love Life Death in a Day" " The Age of Loneliness" "Fabulous Fashionistas" "A Time to Live" "The Vikings are Coming" "Bus Pass Bandits" "Exposure" "Wedding Days" "Behind Closed Doors" "Love" "Perfect Breasts" And many more. Executive Producer of Emmy Nominated " The Falling Man" and Producer /Director of Feature Documentary "Jig" st Mum and Me executive producer, The Falling Man
- Notable work: The Kinky Boot Factory was originally a documentary in the Trouble at the Top run of programmes Bourne produced and directed. Mail Order Brides for World about Us which Bourne produced and directed was then turned into a drama for BBC Two.

Sue Bourne is a Scottish television documentary producer and director. She founded and runs the independent production company Wellpark Productions, which has produced films including My Street, Fabulous Fashionistas, Mum and Me and Jig.

== Early life and background ==
Bourne was born in London to Ethel (née McKenzie) and John Bourne. Her mother was a stay at home mum who later became the subject of one of her film Mum and Me, and her father was a civil servant. When she was one year old she moved with her family to Ayr, Scotland. She attended Ayr Grammar school then the University of Edinburgh and studied politics. Bourne's partner for 16 years was the Polish filmmaker Witold Starecki, who died in 2011. The couple had one child, Holly.

== Filmography ==
- Exposure – Channel 4, Director 2000
- Kiss N Sell – Channel 4, Cutting Edge, 2000
- Perfect Breasts – Channel 4, Producer/Director, 2001
- Bass Pass Bandits – Channel 4, Cutting Edge, Producer/Director, 2001
- The Real Tony Blackburn – Channel 4, Producer/Director
- Behind Closed Doors – Channel 4, Cutting Edge, Producer/Director, 2003
- Strike: When Britain Went to War – Channel 4, Executive Producer, 2003
- Naked Britain – Channel 4, Producer/Director, 2004
- Bosom Buddies – Channel 4, Only Human, Executive Producer, 2005
- Wedding Days – Channel 4, Cutting Edge, Producer/Director, 2006
- The Prince Charles Generation – Channel 4, Cutting Edge, Produced, 2008
- The Red Lion – Channel 4, Cutting Edge, Producer/Director, 2009
- Love, Life, Death In A Day – Channel 4, Cutting Edge, 2009
- Wink, Meet, Delete – An Insider's Guide To Internet Dating' – BBC Scotland, Producer/Director, 2010
- The Falling Man – Channel 4, Executive Producer, 2006
- Mum and Me – One Life BBC1, Producer/Director, 2008; Winner – Best Documentary at the Celtic Media Film Festival, Winner – Mental Health Media "Making A Difference" Award
- My Street – Channel 4, Cutting Edge Producer/Director, 2008
- Jig – Producer/Director, Official Selection HOT DOCS 2011, Dinard Festival du Film, Busan Film Festival
- Fabulous Fashionistas – Channel 4, Producer/Director, 2013
- The Vikings Are Coming – BBC2, Producer/Director, 2015
- The Age of Loneliness – BBC1, Producer/Director, 2016

== Critical response ==
In 2013 Broadcast Magazine named her one of the top directors in the country with 'Fabulous Fashionistas' saying "a new Sue Bourne documentary always feels like a treat in the schedules... In classic Bourne style, a simple concept became a hook to explore the minutiae of everyday lives and the extraordinary stories of ordinary people, never shying away from the frightening aspects of mortality but ultimately celebrating the colorful lives of a group of women determined to accept and embrace the moment".
