= Berna Huebner =

American film director

Berna G. Huebner is an American film director who is the founder of the Hilgos Foundation in Chicago, Illinois, which supports and encourages the ongoing process of artistic creation with people who have different forms of dementia including Alzheimer's.

She is the co-director of I Remember Better When I Paint, a 2009 international documentary film which examines the positive impact of art on people with Alzheimer's and shows how the creative arts can help Alzheimer's patients re-engage in life.

Huebner has served on the Boston University School of Medicine Alzheimer's Board and is Director of the Center for the Study of International Communications in Paris, France. She is the former Research Director for Nelson Rockefeller when he was Governor of New York and then Vice President.
