= I Remember Better When I Paint =

- Theatrical release poster
- Directed by: Eric Ellena; Berna Huebner
- Written by: Eric Ellena; Berna Huebner
- Produced by: Eric Ellena, Berna Huebner, Ian Ayres Guillaume De Ginestel, Mary Louise Stott
- Narrated by: Olivia de Havilland
- Cinematography: Eric Ellena
- Music by: Jérôme Rossi
- Production companies: French Connection Films; Hilgos Foundation
- Release date: 2009
- Running time: 54 minutes
- Country: United States
- Language: English

I Remember Better When I Paint is a feature length international documentary film about the positive impact of art and other creative therapies in people with Alzheimer's disease and how these approaches can change the way the disease is viewed by society. The film examines the way creative arts bypass the limitations of dementia disorders such as Alzheimer's and shows how patients' still-vibrant imaginations are strengthened through therapeutic art.

== Synopsis ==
The film is by Eric Ellena and Berna Huebner, and is narrated by actress Olivia de Havilland. It features an interview with Yasmin Aga Khan, president of Alzheimer's Disease International and daughter of Rita Hayworth, who had Alzheimer's, describing how her mother took up painting while struggling with the disease. The inspiration for the film is the story of Hilda Goldblatt Gorenstein (Hilgos), who had Alzheimer's. As she painted, Hilgos’s mobility and speech began to improve as did her quality of life.

The documentary includes interviews with renowned neurologists who explain how creative activities engage areas of the brain that are not yet damaged by the disease and thus reawaken a sense of personality, identity and dignity in the patient. Doctors interviewed include Robert Neil Butler, founding director of the National Institute of Aging; Sam Gandy of Mount Sinai Medical Center; Gene D. Cohen of George Washington University; Robert Green and Bob Stern of Boston University; and Avertano Noronha of the University of Chicago. The film demonstrates the intersection between the arts, medical and scientific worlds.

== Release ==
The film was selected for the 2016 Flager Film Festival, the 2010 Rhode Island International Film Festival and the 2009 Bel Air Film Festival. In 2014 and 2015, the film broadcast nationwide on public television stations in the United States during November Alzheimer's Awareness month. I Remember Better When I Paint has been released as part of a DVD package which includes the documentary and a series of short supplemental films that further highlight special programs and flesh out the how-tos of organizing an outing, a creative workshop or recreating social bonds between people with Alzheimer's and their families.

== Social media ==
The documentary's Twitter was named a 2015 finalist in the charity category of the Shorty Awards, an annual event that honors the best in social media. From the seven finalists, the 2015 Shorty Award for the best in charity was awarded to the Gates Foundation. In 2020, the account was named among the top ten best on Twitter in the annual WEGO Health Activists Awards.
