= List of folk songs by Roud number =

This is a list of songs by their Roud Folk Song Index numbers; the full catalogue can also be found on the Vaughan Williams Memorial Library website. Some publishers have added Roud numbers to books and liner notes, as has also been done with Child Ballad numbers and Laws numbers. This list (like the article List of the Child Ballads) also serves as a link to articles about the songs, which may use a very different song title.

The songs are listed in the index by accession number, rather than (for example) by subject matter or in order of importance. Some well-known songs have low Roud numbers (for example, many of the Child Ballads), but others have high ones.

Some of the songs were also included in the collection Jacobite Reliques by Scottish poet and novelist James Hogg.

== The Index ==
The index is a database of nearly 200,000 references to nearly 25,000 songs that have been collected from oral tradition in the English language from all over the world. It is compiled by Steve Roud, a former librarian in the London Borough of Croydon. The English Folk Dance and Song Society (EFDSS) listed 187,800 records in the growing Folksong database as at October 2012 (which total includes all of the songs in the Broadside database that have 'traditional' origins).

The purpose of the index is to give each song a unique identifying number. The numbers were assigned on a more or less arbitrary basis, and are not intended to carry any significance in themselves. However, because of the practicalities of compiling the index (building on previously published sources) it is true as a general rule that older and better-known songs tend to occupy low numbers, while songs which are obscure have higher numbers. Closely related songs are grouped under the same Roud number. If a trusted authority gives the name of a song but not the words it is assigned Roud number 000.

== List ==
=== 1 to 100 ===
1. "The Raggle Taggle Gypsy" (Child 200)
2. "The Unfortunate Rake, "St. James Infirmary" (Laws Q26)
3. "The Sprig of Thyme", "The Seeds of Love", "Garners Gay"
4. "Lord Thomas and Fair Annet" (Child 73)
5. "The Three Ravens" (Child 26)
6. "Lamkin" (Child 93)
7. "The Female Highwayman", "Sovay" (Laws N21)
8. "The Twa Sisters" (Child 10)
9. "The Cruel Mother" (Child 20)
10. "Lord Randal" (Child 12)
11. "The Baffled Knight" (Child 112)
12. "The Elfin Knight" (Child 2) (also "Scarborough Fair")
13. "The Dowie Dens o Yarrow" (Child 214)
14. "The Daemon Lover" "House Carpenter" "Well Met Well Met" (Child 243)
15. "The Cruel Ship's Carpenter" (Laws P36A/B)
16. "Frog Went A-Courting"
17. "The Three Butchers" (Laws L4)
18. "The Bramble Briar" (Laws M32)
19. "Honest Labourer"
20. "The Fause Knight Upon the Road" (Child 3)
21. "Lady Isabel and the Elf Knight" (Child 4)
22. "Gil Brenton" (Child 5)
23. "Earl Brand" (Child 7)
24. "Erlinton" (Child 8)
25. "The Fair Flower of Northumberland" (Child 9)
26. "The Cruel Brother" (Child 11)
27. "Babylon", "The Bonnie Banks o Fordie" (Child 14)
28. "Hind Horn" (Child 17)
29. "Sir Lionel" (Child 18)
30. "Willie's Lyke-Wake" (Child 25)
31. "The Trees They Grow So High" (Laws O35)
32. "Kempy Kay" (Child 33)
33. "Hind Etin" (Child 41)
34. "The Broomfield Hill" (Child 43)
35. "Tam Lin" (Child 39)
36. "Captain Wedderburn's Courtship" (Child 46)
37. "Proud Lady Margaret" (Child 47)
38. "The Twa Brothers" (Child 49)
39. "The King's Dochter Lady Jean" (Child 52)
40. "Young Beichan" (Child 53)
41. "Sir Patrick Spens" (Child 58)
42. "Fair Annie" (Child 62)
43. "Child Waters" (Child 63)
44. "Fair Janet" (Child 64)
45. "Lady Maisry", "Bonnie Susie Cleland" (Child 65)
46. "Lord Ingram and Chiel Wyet" (Child 66)
47. "Young Hunting" (Child 68)
48. "Lord Lovel" (Child 75)
49. "The Lass of Roch Royal" (Child 76)
50. "Sweet William's Ghost" (Child 77)
51. "The Unquiet Grave" (Child 78)
52. "Little Musgrave and Lady Barnard" (Child 81)
53. "Child Maurice" (Child 83)
54. "Bonny Barbara Allan" (Child 84)
55. "Prince Robert" (Child 87)
56. "Young Johnstone" (Child 88)
57. "Fause Foodrage" (Child 89)
58. "Jellon Grame" (Child 90)
59. "Fair Mary of Wallington" (Child 91)
60. "Brisk Young Sailor (Courted Me)", "The Alehouse", "Died For Love", etc. (Laws P25)
61. "The Gay Goshawk" (Child 96)
62. "Brown Robyn" (Child 97)
63. "Johnie Scot" (Child 99)
64. "Willie o Winsbury" (Child 100)
65. "Willie o Douglas Dale" (Child 101)
66. "Tom Potts" (Child 109)
67. "The Knight and the Shepherd's Daughter" (Child 110)
68. "The Twelve Days of Christmas"
69. "Johnie Cock" (Child 114)
70. "A Gest of Robyn Hode" (Child 117)
71. "Robin Hood Rescuing Three Squires" (Child 140)
72. "Robin Hood and Queen Katherine" (Child 145)
73. "Sir Hugh" (Child 155)
74. "Queen Elanor's Confession" (Child 156)
75. "Gude Wallace" (Child 157)
76. "Johnie Armstrong" (Child 169)
77. "The Death of Queen Jane" (Child 170)
78. "Six Dukes Went a-Fishing"
79. "Mary Hamilton" (Child 173)
80. "Captain Car", "Edom o Gordon" (Child 178)
81. "The Laird o Logie" (Child 182)
82. "Jock o the Side" (Child 187)
83. "Archie o Cawfield" (Child 188)
84. "Hughie Grame" (Child 191)
85. "The Lochmaben Harper", "The Blind Harper" (Child 192)
86. No record
87. "Jamie Douglas"; "Waly Waly", "The Water Is Wide", "When Cockleshells Turn Silver Bells" (Child 204)
88. "Lord Delaware" (Child 207)
89. "Lord Derwentwater" (Child 208)
90. "Geordie" (Child 209)
91. "The Mother's Malison", "Clyde's Water" (Child 216)
92. "The Broom of Cowdenknowes / Bonny May" (Child 217)
93. "Katharine Jaffray" (Child 221)
94. "Lizie Lindsay" (Child 226)
95. "Glasgow Peggie" (Child 228)
96. "The Earl of Errol" (Child 231)
97. "Richie Story" (Child 232)
98. "Andrew Lammie" (Child 233)
99. "The Earl of Aboyne" (Child 235)
100. "Bonny Baby Livingston" (Child 222)

=== 101 to 200 ===
- 101. "Glenlogie", "Bonnie Jean o' Bethelnie" (Child 238)
- 102. "Lord Saltoun and Auchanachie" (Child 239)
- 103. "The (Bonnie) Rantin' Laddie", "Lord Aboyne" (Child 240)
- 104. "Henry Martin", "Sir Andrew Barton" (Child 167 / Child 250) (see also Roud 192)
- 105. "The Kitchie-Boy", "Bonny Foot-Boy", "Earl Richard's Daughter" (Child 252)
- 106. "Lord William", "Lord Lundy", "Sweet William" (Child 254)
- 107. "Burd Isabel And (Earl/Sir) Patrick", "Burd Bell" (Child 257)
- 108. "Broughty Wa's", "(Burd) Helen" (Child 258)
- 109. "(Lord Thomas and) Lady Margaret", "Clerk Tamas (and Fair Annie)" (Child 260)
- 110. "John Thomson and the Turk", "The Trooper and the Turk" (Child 266)
- 111. "The Heir of Linne" (Child 267)
- 112. "Lady Diamond (and the King's Daughter)", "Lady Daisy", "Eliza's Bower" (Child 269)
- 113. "The Lord of Lorn (and the Flas Steward)" (Child 271)
- 114. "Four Nights Drunk" (Child 274)
- 115. "Get Up and Bar the Door", "John Blunt", "Old John Jones" (Child 275)
- 116. "The Friar (in the Well/and the Maid/Well Fitted)" (Child 276)
- 117. "The Wife Wrapt in Wether's Skin", "The (Wee) Cooper of Fife", "The Daughter of Peggy-O", "Dan Doo", etc. (Child 277)
- 118. "The (Jolly/Ragged/Dirty) Beggar", "Davy Faa", "Farmer and Tinker", "Gaberlunyie Man", etc. (Child 279)
- 119. "The Beggar-Laddie", "The Beggar's (Dawtie/Prince)", etc. (Child 280)
- 120. "The Keach i the Creel" (Child 281)
- 121. "The Highwayman Outwitted By a Farmer's Daughter"
- 122. "Sweet Trinity", "Golden Vanity", "Bold Trellitee", etc. (Child 286)
- 123. "(The) (Young) (Earl of) Essex('s Victory over the Emperor of Germany)", "Queen Elizabeth's Champion", "Great Britain's Glory" (Child 288)
- 124. "The Mermaid", "As I Sailed Out One Friday Night", "The Cabin Boy" (Child 289)
- 125. "The Wylie Wife of the Hie Toun Hie", "The Flowers of Edinburgh", "My Lady Ye Shall Be" (Child 290)
- 126. "The Derby Ram", "As I was Going to Derby"
- 127. "The Leaves of Life", "Under the Leaves", "The Seven Virgins"
- 128. "The Herring Song", "Bolliton Sands", "The (Jolly) (Old/Red) Herring('s Head)"
- 129. "The Rattlin' Bog", "The Everlasting Circle", "Down in the Lowlands"
- 130. "Three Jolly Rogues"
- 131. "The Fox"
- 132. "The Blind Beggar" (Laws N27)
- 133. "Green Grow The Rushes Oh", "Come and I Will Sing You", "The Dilly Song", etc.
- 134. "The Coasts of High Barbaree" (Laws K33)
- 135. "O Let Me in This Ae Night", "Cold Blow And A Rainy Night", "The Laird o' Windywa's", etc.
- 136. "King Orfeo" (Child 19)
- 137. "Widecombe Fair", "Tom Pearce", "Tam Pierce"
- 138. "The Miller's Three Sons", "The Miller's Will", "The Miller and His Sons", "The Dishonest Miller" (Laws Q21)
- 139. "Jones' Ale", "Joan's Ale Was New"
- 140. "The Bold Grenadier", "The Nightingale Song", "One Morning In May", etc. (Laws P14)
- 141. "Dog And Gun", "The Golden Glove" (Laws N20)
- 142. "Charming Mary Neal" (Laws M17)
- 143. "The Counting Song", "One Man Went to Mow", etc.
- 144. "The Maid Freed from the Gallows" (Child 95), "The Prickle Holly Bush"
- 145. "Glasgerion", "Glenkindie" (Child 67)
- 146. "No, Sir, No", "No John No"
- 147. "Clerk Corvill", "(Giles/George) Collins", "Lady Alice" (Child 42 / Child 85)
- 148. "The Banks of Sweet Dundee" (Laws M25)
- 149. "The Crabfish"
- 150. "When I Was a Young Man I Lived Rarely"
- 151. "An Awhesyth", "The Pretty Ploughboy", or other versions of "The Lark in the Morning"; "The Lark in the Morning" is a version on its own
- 152. "Early Early In The Spring", "The Trail To Mexico", "The Sailor Deceived", etc. (Laws M1)
- 153. "The Haymakers' Song", "The (Pleasant) Month of May"
- 154. "I Once Loved a Lass", "The False Bride", "The Week Before Easter"
- 155. "Mary Of The (Wild) Moor" (Laws P24)
- 156. "The Betrayed Maiden", "Betsy (The Waiting Maid)", etc. (Laws M20)
- 157. "Banks of the Ohio" (Laws F5)
- 158. "Bold William Taylor" (Laws N11)
- 159. "The Soldier's Alphabet"
- 160. "The Farmer's Curst Wife" (Child 278)
- 161. "Riddles Wisely Expounded", "Lay Bent To The Bonny Broom", "The Devil's Nine Questions", etc. (Child 1)
- 162. "The Light Dragoon", "The Trooper And The Maid", etc. (Child 299)
- 163. "The Jolly Ploughboy", "The Scarlet And The Blue", "The Warwickshire RHA", etc.
- 164. "John Barleycorn"
- 165. "Adieu My Lovely Nancy", "The Sailor's Farewell", "Swansea Town", etc.
- 166. "Polly Vaughn" (Laws O36)
- 167. "The Brisk Young Butcher", "The Leicester Chambermaid", "Aikey Fair", etc.
- 168. "The Fair Lass Of Islington"
- 169. "The Seasons Of The Year"
- 170. "Once I Had A Sweetheart"
- 171. "Young Ramble Away", "Brimbledown Fair"
- 172. "Bonnie Annie", "The Banks Of Green Willow" (Child 24)
- 173. "Strawberry Fair"
- 174. "The Cobbler And The Butcher", "The Cunning Cobbler Done Over"
- 175. "Cruel Was My Father", etc. (Laws P20)
- 176. "The Little Dun Mare"
- 177. No record
- 178. "The Gentleman Soldier", "The Sentry", etc.
- 179. "The Grey Cock", "Saw You My Father?", "The Cock Is Crowing", etc. (Child 248)
- 180. ""The Brown Girl", "The Rich Irish Lady", "Sweet Sally", "Pretty Sally", "A Sailor From Dover", "The Bold Sailor" (Child 295)
- 181. "The Maid on The Shore", "The Mermaid", "The Sea Captain" (Laws K27)
- 182. "Edwin", "Young Edwin in the Lowlands Low"
- 183. "Eggs and Marrowbone", "Marrowbones" (Laws Q2)
- 184. "Johnny Sands" (Laws Q3)
- 185. "The Drowned (Lover/Sailor)", "In London Fair City", "Scarborough Banks", etc. (Laws K18)
- 186. "The (Pretty/Jolly/Simple) Ploughboy" (Laws M24)
- 187. "Jemmy And Nancy", "The Yarmouth Tragedy", etc. (Laws M38)
- 188. "The Councillor's Daughter", "The Crafty Lover", "The Lawyer Outwitted", etc. (Laws N26)
- 189. "The Lake Of Coulfin", "Willy Leonard", etc. (Laws Q33)
- 190. "Bold Reynard", "Bold Reynolds", "Gentlemen of High Renown"
- 191. "The White/Blue/Green Cockade", "Sad Recruit", etc.
- 192. "Elder Bordee", "A True Relation of the Death of Sir Andrew Barton a Pyrate and Rover" (Child 167 / Child 250) (see also Roud 104)
- 193. "Sweet Lemminy"
- 194. No record
- 195. "Sir Arthur And Sweet Mollee", etc. (Laws O14)
- 196. "The Wife of Usher's Well", "The Lady Gay", "Three Little Babes", etc. (Child 79)
- 197. "The Great Silkie of Sule Skerry" (Child 113)
- 198. "Willie and Lady Maisry" (Child 70)
- 199. "The Famous Flower of Serving-Men" (Child 106)
- 200. "Edward", "How Come That Blood on Your Shirt Sleeve", etc. (Child 13)

=== 201 to 300 ===
- 201. "The False Lover Won Back" (Child 218)
- 202. "The Jolly Ploughboy", "Two Young Brethren", "The Two Brothers"
- 203. "O Good Ale Thou Art My Darling"
- 204. "Maa Bonny Lad"
- 205. "The Bonny Hind" (Child 50)
- 206. "Rare Willie Drowned in Yarrow" (Child 215)
- 207. "Santianna", "Santy Anna", "The Plains of Mexico"
- 208. "Poor Paddy Works on the Railway"
- 209. "Here We Come A-wassailing", "Gloucestershire Wassail", "Gower Wassail", and other wassails
- 210. "Maids When You're Young Never Wed an Old Man"
- 211. "Wa'ney Island Cockfight", "The Bonny Grey"
- 212. "Gaberlunzie Man"
- 213. No record
- 214. "Famed Waterloo" (Laws 38)
- 215. "Maria Martin"
- 216. "Stormalong"
- 217. "When Bucks A-Hunting Go"
- 218. "Oxford/Worcester City"
- 219. "Thomas the Rhymer" (Child 37)
- 220. "Willie's Lady" (Child 6)
- 221. "Van Diemen's Land", "Young Henry the Poacher"
- 222. "Thorny Moor Woods"
- 223. "The Ballad of Chevy Chase", "The Hunting of Cheviot" (Child 162)
- 224. "Captain Ward and the Rainbow" (Child 287)
- 225. No record
- 226. "The Female Drummer"
- 227. "Admiral Benbow"
- 228. "The Widow of Westmoreland's Daughter"
- 229. "Little Gypsy Girl" (Laws O4)
- 230. "We Wish You a Merry Christmas", "Open the Door", etc.
- 231. "The Cabin Boy", "I am a Maid that's Deep in Love" (Laws 231)
- 232. "The Game Of Cards", "Game of All Fours"
- 233. "The Duke of Marlborough"
- 234. "Lizie Wan" (Child 51)
- 235. "A You a Hinny Bird"
- 236. "The Cutty Wren"
- 237. "Bessy Bell and Mary Gray" (Child 201)
- 238. "The Happy Couple" (Laws N15)
- 239. "Female Cabin Boy" (Laws N13), "Handsome Cabin Boy" (Laws M23)
- 240. "The Best Old Man", "My Good Old Man", "My Old Man"
- 241. "The German Clockmaker", "I am a Von German"
- 242. "Young Allan" (Child 245)
- 243. "Redesdale and Wise William" (Child 246)
- 244. "Willie's Fatal Visit" (Child 255)
- 245. "Alison and Willie" (Child 256)
- 246. "The Suffolk Miracle", "The Holland Handkerchief"(Child 272)
- 247. "The Laird o Drum" (Child 236)
- 248. "King Edward the Fourth and a Tanner of Tamworth" (Child 273)
- 249. "John Dory" (Child 284)
- 250. "John of Hazelgreen" (Child 293)
- 251. "King Henry Fifth's Conquest of France" (Child 164)
- 252. "Three Drunken Maidens"
- 253. "Fair Margaret and Sweet William" (Child 74)
- 254. "Frankie and Johnny", "Frankie Dean"
- 255. "Engine One-Forty-Three", "The FFV", "George Alley", etc. (Laws G3)
- 256. "The Jam at Gerry's Rock" (Laws C1)
- 257. "The State of Arkansas"
- 258. "The Soldiers's Poor Little Boy" (Laws Q28)
- 259. "Jack o' Diamonds"
- 260. "Fair Charlotte" (Laws G17)
- 261. "The Boston Burglar" (Laws L16)
- 262. "The Girl I Left Behind" (Laws P1)
- 263. "The Cruel Miller" (Laws P35)
- 264. "John Riley", "The Broken Token", "A Fair Young Maid All in Her Garden" (Laws N42)
- 265. "The Dark Eyed Sailor" (Laws N35)
- 266. "Banks of Claudy", "Claudy Banks", "Cloddy Banks" (Laws N40)
- 267. "George Riley", "John Riley", "Young Riley" (Laws N36 / Laws N37)
- 268. "Jack Monroe"
- 269. "Rosemary Lane", "Bell Bottom Trousers"
- 270. "John Riley" (Laws M8)
- 271. "Villikens and Dinah" (Laws M31)
- 272. "Sweet England", "The Happy Stranger"
- 273. "A Sailor's Life" (Laws K12)
- 274. "The Sailor's Bride" (Laws K10)
- 275. "The Little Mohee", "The Lass of Mohee" (Laws H8)
- 276. "The Green Bed" (Laws K36)
- 277. "Seventeen Come Sunday" (Laws O17)
- 278. "The Seven Joys of Mary"
- 279. "Green Grows the Laurel"
- 280. "Erin's Green Shore" (Laws Q27)
- 281. "Father Grumble", "The Old Man Who Lived in the Woods" (Laws Q1)
- 282. "Grandma's Advice"
- 283. "Three Jolly Huntsmen", "Six Jovial Welshmen"
- 284. "Shepherds Are the Best of Men"
- 285. "Old Polina"
- 286. "The Beggars Chorus", "To the Begging I Will Go"
- 287. "Old Christmas Day"
- 288. "Babes in the Wood" (Laws Q34)
- 289. "The Box Upon Her Head" (Laws L3)
- 290. "Three Maidens A-Milking Did Go"
- 291. "The Bold Fisherman" (Laws O24)
- 292. "Lass O' Glenshea" (Laws O6)
- 293. "My Bonny Boy", "The Grey Hawk"
- 294. "Brian O Linn"
- 295. No record
- 296. "The Spanish Fight"
- 297. "Cupid's Garden"
- 298. "Dabbling in the Dew"
- 299. "The Lincolnshire Poacher"
- 300. "Adieu to Your Judges and Juries"

=== 301 to 400 ===
- 301. "Loss of the Amphitrite", "The Anford-wright"
- 302. "King John and the Bishop" (Child 45)
- 303. "The Twa Knights" (Child 268)
- 304. "Souling Song", "Catherning", "Stafford Begging Song", "Caking Song"
- 305. "May Song", "May-day Carol", "Awake Awake", "Padstow May Song", "Whitsuntide Carol", "Bedfordshire May carol", "Swinton May song"
- 306. "The Carnal and the Crane", "King Herod and the Cock", "King Pharim" (Child 55)
- 307. "The Little Lowland Maid", "The Cruel Lowland Maid", "The Pretty Sailor"
- 308. "Irish Girl", "New Irish Girl", "Molly Bawn", "As I Walked Out", "Red Red Rose", "Banagher Town", "The Irish Wash-woman", "Grace Grace", "Gramachree", "My Irish Polly", "I Wish I Were", "One May Morning", "Love It is a Killing Thing", "Irish Girl's Lament", "I Would I Were a Little Bird", "Pretty Polly", "Let the Wind Blow High or Low", "One Day as I Walked", "I Wish I Was in Dublin Town", "Red and Rosie Wis Her Cheeks", "I Wish I Had You in Yon Green Lawn", "The Manchester Angel", "Down By Yon Riverside", "Her Boots Were O the Spanish Leather"
- 309. "Canada-I-O"
- 310. "Harvest Home", "Here's a Health unto Our Master", "The Mistress's Health", "Shepherd's Health", "The Greasy Cook", "Sheep Shearing Toast", "Drink Boys Drink", "Peas Beans Oats and the Barley", "Bridal Song", "The Haymakers' Song"
- 311. "The Bold Trooper", "The Old Drover", "The Game Cock"
- 312. "Blackwater Side" (Laws O1)
- 313. "The Mountaineer's Courtship", "When Shall We Be Married", "Nicol O' Cod", "Nicholas Wood", "Haymaker's Song", "The Country Courtship", "What'll I Wear to the Wedding John", "Buffalo Boy", "My Dear Old Innocent Boy", "Reckle Mahudie", "My Old Sweet Nichol", "Joan to Jan", "Dear Old Ages Boy", "Nickety Nod", "John and Mary", "Where Shall We Go For Our Honeymoon John", "Johnny My Darling Lad"
- 314. "The Sailor Likes His Bottle O", "The Sailor's Loves", "So Early in the Morning", "A Bottle of Rum"
- 315. "Five Gallon Jar"
- 316. No record
- 317. "Rio Grande"
- 318. "A Long Time Ago", "Noah's Ark Shanty"
- 319. "Sacramento"
- 320. "Sing Fare You Well"
- 321. "The Bold Dragoon" (Laws M27)
- 322. "Drunken Sailor"
- 323. "The Battle of Chevy Chase"
- 324. "Oh Shenandoah"
- 325. "South Australia"
- 326. "Billy Boy", "Billy My Billy", "Charming Billy", "My Boy Willie", "My Boy Tammy", "Tammy's Courtship", "I Am to Court a Wife", "The Lammie", "Where Have You Been All the Day", "We're All Jolly Fellows That Follow the Plough", "Lord Rendal", "Bonny Lad Highland Lad", "Willy the Witch", "Can't Jump Josie"
- 327. "The Bully Boat", "Sally My Dear", "Ranzo", "Oh What Did You Give for Your Fine Leg O' Mutton"
- 328. "Zip Coon", "Wild Goose Nation", "Ranso", "Huckleberry Hunting", "The Wild Goose Shanty"
- 329. "Hares on the Mountain", "Sally my Dear", "Knife in the Window", "Crawling and Creeping"
- 330. "The Riddle Song", "I Gave My Love a Cherry", "Perry Merry Dictum Domine", "Kilkenny Is a Fine Place", "Don't You Go A-rushing", "Four Sisters", "Four Brothers", "My Father Gave Me Fifty Cents", "Gifts From Over the Sea", "I'm a Rover", "Dublin Bay"
- 331. "Sally in the Garden Sifting Sand", "Sally Ann", "The Hog-eyed Man", "Rodybodysho", "Hauling into Blackwall Docks", "O Who's Been Here", "As I Went up in My Cornfield"
- 332. "Robin Hood and the Tanner" (Child 126)
- 333. "The Bold Pedlar and Robin Hood" (Child 132)
- 334. "The Bonny Earl of Murray" (Child 181)
- 335. "The Death of Parcy Reed" (Child 193)
- 336. "The Fire of Frendraught" (Child 196)
- 337. "Bothwell Bridge" (Child 206)
- 338. "Bonnie James Campbell" (Child 210)
- 339. "The Gardener" (Child 219)
- 340. "Rob Roy" (Child 225)
- 341. "Bonny Lizie Baillie" (Child 227)
- 342. "The Duke of Gordon's Daughter" (Child 237)
- 343. "The Baron o Leys" (Child 241)
- 344. "Astrilly", "The Pitman's Farewell"
- 345. "Jeannie and Jamie", "Huntingtower" (Laws O23)
- 346. "All Jolly Fellows that Follow the Plough", "Jolly Plough Boys", "Arise My Jolly Fellows", "'Twas Early One Morning", "One Midsummer's Morning", "The Cocks Were A-crowing", etc.
- 347. "Greenland Whale Fishery"
- 348. "William and Mary", "Little Mary, The Sailor's Bride", etc. (Laws N28)
- 349. "Isle Of St. Helena", "Boney's In St. Helena", "Boney's Defeat"
- 350. "The Soldier and the Sailor", "The Soldier's Prayer"
- 351. "The River Lea"
- 352. No record
- 353. "Johnnie Booker", "Do My Johnny Poco"
- 354. "Leave Her Johnnie Leave Her"
- 355. "The Painful Plough", "The Useful Plough", "The Faithful Plough", "Old Friend Gardener and Ploughman"
- 356. "The Sweet Nightingale"
- 357. "Old Humphrey Hodge", "Rock the Cradle John"
- 358. "Bold Reynard the Fox", "The Duke's Hunt"
- 359. "Ellen the Fair"
- 360. "The Roving Journeyman", "The Roving Irishman", "The Roving Navvie Man", "Roving Jack"
- 361. "The Courting Case", "The Drunkard's Courtship"
- 362. "The Old Man From Over The Sea"
- 363. "Hares in the Old Plantation", "The Hearty Poacher", "I Keep My Dogs and Ferrets, Too"
- 364. "Jack the Rover", "Aylesbury Girl", "Haselbury Girl", "As I Went Down to Salisbury", "As I Rode Up Through London Street", "Untied Garter"
- 365. "Arthur of Bradley's Wedding"
- 366. "Seeking Service", "The Rigwiddy Carlin", "Bargain with Me", "Tam Bo/Bowie/Booey", "Magherafelt Hiring Fair", "My Brave Billy Boy", "The Wanton Widow"
- 367. "Sweet Polly Oliver"
- 368. "Blow the Candle Out", "Bengalee Baboo"
- 369. "Sam Hall" (Laws L5)
- 370. "At the Dawning of the Day"
- 371. "Sweet Nightingale", "Come Come My Pretty Maid", "Well Met Pretty Maid", "To Milk in the Valley Below", "The Milkpail"
- 372. "British Man-of-war", "Lovely/Pretty Susan"
- 373. "The Braemar Poacher", "The Roving Highlander", "The Poacher of Benabourd"
- 374. "The Wark O' the Weavers" (David Shaw)
- 375. "O'er the Muir Among the Heather", "Up Yon Wide and Lonely Glen", "Heather Down the Moor"
- 376. "Outward Bound", "The Faithful Sailor Boy" (Laws K13)
- 377. "Basket of Eggs", "Eggs in Her Basket"
- 378. "Bonny Blue Handkerchief"
- 379. "Green Broom", "The Broom Dasher", "Jack and His Brooms"
- 380. "Seven/Two Years O'er Young", "Touch Not the Nettle"
- 381. "The Scornful Dame", "Come Write Me Down Ye Powers Above", "Second Thoughts Best", "The Shepherd and His Bride"
- 382. "Richard/Dicky of Taunton Dean", "Old Dobbin", "Dumbledown Deary"
- 383. "The Broken-down Gentleman"
- 384. "Farewell to Nova Scotia"
- 385. "Batchelor's Hall", "Bachelor's Hall", "When Boys Go A-courting"
- 386. "Rambling Boys/Lads of Pleasure"
- 387. "The Blackbird", "If I Was a Blackbird"
- 388. "The Wreck off Scilly", "The Rocks of Scilly", "Stormy Winds Do Blow"
- 389. "Hark! Hark! What News?"
- 390. "Old Dan Tucker"
- 391. "Jeannette and Jeannot", "Poor Jeannette"
- 392. No record
- 393. "The Hearty Good Fellow", "One Penny", "No Money and Plenty", "Saddle My Horse"
- 394. "God Rest You Merry Gentlemen", "Come All You Worthy Gentlemen"
- 395. "Cheerly Man", "Sally Racket"
- 396. "The Bold Lieutenant", "The London Lady", "The Lion's Den", "Lions and Tigers", "St. James's", "The Lady of Carlisle" (Laws O25)
- 397. "Reynardine"
- 398. "Caroline of Edinburgh Town", "The Hedginer" (Laws P27)
- 399. "The Sheffield/Unfortunate Apprentice", "Died for Love of You", "The Chambermaid", "The Maid and Her Box", "My Sad Overthrow"
- 400. "William Hall", "George Reilly", "The Brisk Young Lover/Farmer"

=== 401 to 500 ===
- 401. "No, My Love No", "Warfare Is Raging", "Bad Company Did Entice Me"
- 402. "I Drew My Ship into a Harbour", "Awake Awake You Drowsy Sleeper", "Who Is Tapping at my Window?", "I'll Lock You Up in Your Bedchamber", "Cruel Father", "Daughter In The Dungeon"
- 403. "The Drowsy Sleeper"
- 404. "The State of Georgia", "Born and Raised in Ole Virginia", "O Molly Dear, Go Ask Your Mother"
- 405. "Lover's Lament","Beauty Bright", "Oh Once I Did Court a Damsel", "Don't You Remember Last Friday Night", "Off to the War", "The Single Girl"
- 406. "Locks and Bolts", "'Twas over Hills", "Young Men and Maids", "I Never Knew", "The Back o' Benachie", "Johnny Dials", "Over Hills and over Fields", "Anna May", "The Cuckoo"
- 407. "Pretty Nancy of Yarmouth", "Barbara Allen"
- 408. "The Farmer's Boy"
- 409. "Butcher Boy"
- 410. "Bury Me Beneath the Willow"
- 411. "Dear Companion"
- 412. "The Rejected Lover"
- 413. "The Cuckoo"
- 414. "On Top of Old Smoky"
- 415. "The Blind Girl", "The Blind Child's Prayer"
- 416. No record
- 417. "Pretty Saro", "Go Away Willie", "Sir Hugh"
- 418. "Mary at the Garden Gate"
- 419. "The False Young Man", "False True Love", "Bird in a Cage", "T Stands for Thomas", "False Lover's Farewell", "As I Walked Out One May Morning", "The Verdant Braes of Screen"
- 420. "The Silk Merchant's Daughter", "Miss Martha", "The Virginian Lover"
- 421. "Sinful to Flirt"
- 422. "Turtle Dove", "True Lover's Farewell", "Careless Love", "Fare Thee Well"
- 423. No record
- 424. "My Love Is Over the Sea", "Sailing on the Sea", "Sea Song"
- 425. "The Bind Girl's Prayer" [sic]
- 426. "Rosewood Casket"
- 427. "Tarry Trousers"
- 428. "The Gambling Man"
- 429. No record
- 430. "Pretty Polly Perkins of Paddington Green"
- 431. "Rattlesnake Mountain"
- 432. "Will the Weaver" (Laws Q9)
- 433. "A Week's Work Well Done", "Tiresome Wife", "The Holly Twig", "Bachelor Bright and Brave"
- 434. "The Dumb Wife's Tongue Let Loose"
- 435. "The Weary Pund O'Tow"
- 436. "Single Girl", "O Then", "The Deserter"
- 437. "O Then O Then", "I Wish I Was Single Again"
- 438. "The Lazy Farmer", "The Lazy Man", "Georgia Boy", "Harm Link"
- 439. "Spring Glee","When Spring Comes In", "The Dairymaid"
- 440. "Cornbread and Buttermilk", "Old Virginia Girls"
- 441. "I Must and I Will Get Married", "The Fit's Come On Me Now"
- 442. "Hardly Think I Will", "Common Bill", "Silly Billy", "The Green Young Man"
- 443. "Scenes Of Winter"
- 444. "Charles Guiteau" (Laws E11)
- 445. No record
- 446. "Down in the Willow Garden", "Rose Connelly" (Laws F6)
- 447. "Omie Wise"
- 448. "Ellen Smith" (Laws F11)
- 449. "Macafee's Confession", "Harry Gray"
- 450. "When the Work's All Done This Fall"
- 451. "Come All You Fair and Tender Ladies"
- 452. "The Bitter Withy"
- 453. "The Cherry-Tree Carol" (Child 54)
- 454. "The Irish Girl", "Meeting Is a Pleasure", "Loving Hanner", "You Will Remember"
- 455. "Johnny Doyle/Dials", "The Muddy Droves"
- 456. "Skewball", "The Plains of Kildare"
- 457. "The Orphan Girl"
- 458. "Two Little Orphans"
- 459. "Fond Affection", "Go and Leave Me, If You Wish It", "Once I Loved"
- 460. "I'm Thinking Tonight of My Blue Eyes", "Broken Vows", "Broken Hearted Lovers"
- 461. "Fair and Tender Maidens"
- 462. No record
- 463. "They Were Standing By the Window"
- 464. "Look on and Cry"
- 465. "The Rowan County Murder"
- 466. "The Drowned Lover", "Down by the Sea-Shore", "Oh! My Love's Dead", "I Never Will Marry" (Laws K17)
- 467. "The Deaf Woman's Courtship"
- 468. "Billy Grimes"
- 469. "The Foolish Boy", "The Swapping Song", "The Bugle Played for Me", "Six Horses", etc.
- 470. "The Mocking Bird"
- 471. "Black Mustache"
- 472. "Blow the Wind Wester/Whistling"
- 473. "Well Done Liar", "Martin Said To His Man"
- 474. "I Have Finished Him a Letter", "Anna Lee"
- 475. "All For Me Grog"
- 476. "Brennan on the Moor"
- 477. "Dives and Lazarus" (Child 56)
- 478. "The New York Trader", "Sir William Gower", "Bedlam", etc.
- 479. "Sir Cawline" (Child 61)
- 480. "Come All You Western Rangers"
- 481. "Tom's Gone to Ilo"
- 482. "Brown Adam" (Child 98)
- 483. "The Bailiff's Daughter of Islington" (Child 105)
- 484. "Lowlands of Holland", "Come All You Little Irish Girls", "The Lawlands O' Holland", "(The) Low (Low) Lands of Holland", "The Lowlands O' Holland", "Lowlands Low", "The Maid's Lamentation For the Loss of Her True Love", "The Lowlands of Germany", "The Soldier Bride's Lament", "Maiden's Complaint For the Loss of Her Sailor", "The Lily of Arkansas", "Sea Captain, (the/a) New Song", "I'll Build Myself a Gallant Ship", "Abroad as I Was Walking", "Holland is a Fine Place", "A New Song, Called the Distressed Sailor", "The Cold Fields of Ireland",
- 485. "Boney Was a Warrior"
- 486. "New York Girls", "Can't You Dance the Polka"
- 487. "Lady Franklin's Lament", "Lord Franklin" (Laws K9)
- 488. "Whip Jamboree"
- 489. "Soldier Will You Marry Me"
- 490. "The Newry Highwayman", "Adieu, Adieu", "The Rambling Boy" (Laws L12)
- 491. "The Poor Old Couple"
- 492. "The Rainbow", "The Fight of the Spanish Main", "The Rich Damsel", "As We Were A-Sailing", etc. (Laws N4)
- 493. "The Deserter"
- 494. "Cock Robin"
- 495. "Died for Love", "Oh What a Voice", "I Wish I Wish", "I Wish I Was a Child Again", "Sweet William"
- 496. "Glee", "Of All The Birds", "Jolly Red Nose", "The Owl"
- 497. "Christmas Day in the Morning"
- 498. "The Roving Gambler"
- 499. "Man of Constant Sorrow"
- 500. "Pearl Bryant", "Jealous Lover", "The Berkshire Tragedy", "Philadelphia lawyer" (Laws F1A / Laws F1B / Laws F1C)

=== 501 to 600 ===
- 501. "Skin and Bones"
- 502. "London Bridge Is Falling Down"
- 503. "Miller of Dee"
- 504. No record
- 505. "Wicked Polly"
- 506. "Whistle O'er the Lave O't", "The Kneeband", "My Mother Sent Me for Some Water"
- 507. No record
- 508. No record
- 509. "The Nut Girl", "A-Nutting We Will Go"
- 510. "Butter and Cheese and All"
- 511. "Jack the Jolly Tar", "Pull the String", "Do Me Ama": recorded by Martin Carthy for Byker Hill (1967)
- 512. "Colin and Phoebe"
- 513. "Poor Old Horse"
- 514. "The Holly and the Ivy", "Sans Day Carol"
- 515. "The Massacre at Glencoe", "The Pride of Glencoe", "MacDonald", "Donald's Return to Glencoe"
- 516. "With my Navvy Boots On", "Bold English Navvy"
- 517. "Airlin's Fine Braes", "Cairse of Brindese/Pomaise"
- 518. "The Rambling Sailor"
- 519. "Van Diemen's Land", "The Poacher's/Smuggler's Song"
- 520. "The Kerry Recruit" (Laws J8)
- 521. "Donald Munro", "Two Sons of North Britain"
- 522. "The Death of Nelson"
- 523. "The Loss of the Ramillies", "The Wreck of the Ramillies"
- 524. "Ye Gentlemen of England"
- 525. "Down on Erin's Wild Shore", "The Desolate Widow", "Isle of Man Shore", "Quays of Belfast"
- 526. "Charles Dickson", "Sally Monroe"
- 527. "Farewell, Dearest Nancy"
- 528. "The Bold Princess Royal" (Laws K29)
- 529. "Kelly the Pirate"
- 530. "The Tarry Sailor"
- 531. "The Saucy Sailor Boy" (Laws K38)
- 532. No record
- 533. "Whiskey in the Jar"
- 534. "Patrick Fleming", "Lovell the Robber"
- 535. No record
- 536. "William and Harriet"
- 537. "Willie Reilly (And (His) (Dear) Colleen Bawn)"
- 538. "The Trial of Willy Reilly"
- 539. "Her Servant Man"
- 540. "The Squire's Young Daughter"
- 541. "The Braes o' Balquither" (inspiration for "Wild Mountain Thyme"/"Will You Go Lassie, Go")
- 542. "Yonder Stands a Lovely Creature", "The Roving Sailor", "Ripest Apples", "Spanish Lady"
- 543. No record
- 544. "Farmyard Song", "I Love My Little Rooster", "The Thrashing Machine"
- 545. "The Bonnie Lass o' Fyvie", "Peggy-O"
- 546. "Georgie Barnwell"
- 547. No record
- 548. "The Rich Merchant's Daughter", "Flower of London"
- 549. "The Red River Shore" (Laws M26)
- 550. "The Paisley Officer"
- 551. "Lisbon", "William and Nancy/Polly" (Laws N8)
- 552. "The Silk Merchant's Daughter", "The Miser", "New York Streets"
- 553. "Caroline and her Sailor Bold" (Laws N17)
- 554. "The Prince of Morocco", "The Young Prince of Spain"
- 555. "Kate and Her Horns", "The Clothier"
- 556. "Love In a Tub", "The Old Miser Outwitted"
- 557. "Johnny German"
- 558. "Foggy Dew" (Laws O3)
- 559. "Blackberry Fold"
- 560. "William and Susan", "Black-eyed Susan" (Laws O28)
- 561. "Poor Mary in the Silvery Tide"
- 562. "The Maid of the Sweet Brown Knowe"
- 563. "Rambling Beauty", "The Widow's Daughter"
- 564. "Blackwater Side" (Laws P18)
- 565. "Bonny Irish Boy"
- 566. "Barren Down Brae" See Roud 1423
- 567. "All Around My Hat", "The Nobleman's Wedding", "Another Man's Wedding" (Laws P31)
- 568. "I Am a Sailor by My Right"
- 569. "The Old Oak Tree"
- 570. "The (Little Lousy) Tailor", "(There Was a / The) Jolly Boatman", "(The / The Old / Bold / The Bold) (Boatswain / Boatsman) Of Dover", "(The) (Boatswain / Sailor) and the Tailor", "Bold Bos'n", "(Tailor / The Boatsman / The Boatman) and the (Chest / Kist)", "The Jolly (Boatswain / Bosun)", "There Was a Wealthy Merchant", "The (Boatsman / Boatswain) and the Tailor", "The Sailor Boy", "The Tailor in the (Tea) Chest", "The (Deil / Devil) in the Kist", "The Old Bo's'n", "The Tailor and the Sailor", "The Bosun's Chest", "The Boatswain's (Honest) Wife", "Johnny's Gone to Sea", "The Boatman's Wife and the Tailor", "The Boatswain and the Lass that loves a Sailor", "The Bold Bo'sun", "The Jolly Sailor", "Old Sea Chest", "The (Little / Pretty) Tailor"
- 571. "Lather and Shave"
- 572. "The Turkey Factor", "The Factor's Garland"
- 573. "Paper of Pins", "Blue Muslin", "The Marriage Song", "The Silver Pin"
- 574. "Sucking Pig", "The Parson and the Pig"
- 575. "Jan's Courtship", "Poor Bob", "Roger's Courtship"
- 576. "Searching for Lambs"
- 577. "Little Boney", "Boney's Total Defeat and Wellington's Victory"
- 578. "The Maid in Bedlam", "The Loyal Lover"
- 579. "I Shall Be Married Next Monday Morning"
- 580. "Hare Hunting Song", "The Morning is Charming"
- 581. "Jenny of the Moor"
- 582. "The Tardy Wooer", "Gallant and Gay"
- 583. "Cold Winter Is Past", "The Curragh of Kildare"
- 584. "Dido and Spandigo", "Dido Bendigo", "The Duke's Hunt"
- 585. "In Bibberley Town", "The Beverly Maid"
- 586. "Banks of Sweet Primroses"
- 587. "The Americans Have Stolen my True Love Away", "American King", "The Young Rival"
- 588. "The Rifle Boys", "Success to the Blues"
- 589. "Little Bingo"
- 590. "Hodge of the Mill and Buxom Nell", "Roger of the Vale"
- 591. "Once More A-lumb'ring Go"
- 592. "Lovely Joan"
- 593. "Farewell Lads and Lasses", "I live not where I love"
- 594. "Queen of the May"
- 595. "The Knight's Dream", "The Labouring Man's Daughter", "Cornish Young Man"
- 596. "Farewell to Kingsbridge", "North Amerikay"
- 597. "Sussex Carol", "On Christmas Night All Christians Sing"
- 598. "Ratcliffe Highway"
- 599. "Spurn Point", "The Wreck of the Industry"
- 600. "Hills Of Caledonia", "Jamie/John Raeburn"

=== 601 to 700 ===
- 601. "The Old Miser", "The Sailor's Misfortune and Happy Marriage", "The Lady of Riches", "The Press Gang", "The Lady and the Sailor"
- 602. "Our Captain Calls", "The Distressed Maid"
- 603. "Banks of the Roses"
- 604. "Welcome Sailor", "The Nightingale"
- 605. "Through Moorfields"
- 606. "The Brisk and Bonny Lad", "The Country Lass"
- 607. "Through the Groves"
- 608. "Cottage Near a Wood", "It's Forty Long Miles"
- 609. "The Death of Bill Brown"
- 610. "The Rippon Sword Dancers' Song", "Pace Egging Song"
- 611. "Jack Donahoe"
- 612. "Sidney Allen"
- 613. "Boston Harbour"
- 614. "Pace Egging Song"
- 615. "He That Will Not Merry Be"
- 616. "Heave Away", "We're All Bound to Go"
- 617. "The Ages of Man"
- 618. "Smuggler's Boy"
- 619. "Honest Ploughman"
- 620. "Poor Black Bess"
- 621. "Turpin Hero"
- 622. "Bloody Waterloo"
- 623. "Andrew Rose", "Andrew Ross"
- 624. "General Wolfe"
- 625. "The Yankee Man-of-War", "The Stately Southerner"
- 626. "Constitution and Guerrierre"
- 627. "Young Edward", "The Battle of Mill Springs"
- 628. "The Dying Ranger"
- 629. "Two Soldiers", "The Fierce Last Charge", "The Battle of Gettysburg"
- 630. "The Merrimac", "The Cumberland and the Merrimac"
- 631. "The Dying Cowboy", "The Lone Prairie"
- 632. "Billy Venero"
- 633. "The Lonely Cowboy", "Cowboy's Home Sweet Home"
- 634. "The Hills of Mexico", "Buffalo Skinners", "On the Trail of the Buffalo"
- 635. "My Heart's Tonight in Texas"
- 636. "Jimmy Judge"
- 637. "Johnny Doyle", "Johnny Stiles"
- 638. "Jim Whalen"
- 639. "Harry Dunn"
- 640. "Michigan-i-o", "Canaday-i-o", "The Jolly Lumberman"
- 641. "The Backwoodsman"
- 642. "Jack Haggerty"
- 643. "The Rock Island Line"
- 644. "Go to Sea Once More"
- 645. "The Bigler's Crew"
- 646. "Charles Augustus Anderson", "The Saladin Mutiny"
- 647. "Bound Down to Newfoundland", "The Schooner Mary Ann"
- 648. "The Gallant Brigantine"
- 649. "The Maid of Amsterdam"
- 650. "Johnny Come Down to Hilo"
- 651. "Whiskey Johnny"
- 652. "Haul on the Bowline"
- 653. "Mainsail Haul", "Paddy Lay Back"
- 654. "Still I Love Him", "The Black Shawl", "Do You Love an Apple?", "I'll Go With Him Wherever He Goes"
- 655. "Death ('Tis/is) a Melancholy (Day/Call)", "Tribulation", "Awful Awful Awful"
- 656. "The Little Family", "Bethany"
- 657. "Amanda (the Captive/and Albin)", "(Her/The) White Bosom Bare", "(The) White (Maiden) Captive", "Young Albin", "Olban", "Young Alban and Amandy", "Lamanda", "The Wild Mustard River", "(Bright/Sufferings of) Amanda" (Laws H15)
- 658. "Burglar Man" (Laws H23)
- 659. "(Courting) the Widow's Daughter", "The Widow's (Old Broom/A-courtin')", "Last Saturday Night (Was Jolly/I Entered a House)", "Hard Times", "Johnny Mccardner", "Billy B. Madison" (Laws H25)
- 660. "Pleasant and Delightful"
- 661. "Peggy (Band/Bawn/Bond/Bain/Ban/Bann)", "Peggy Bawn's Air", "As I Went O'er", "A Song About a Man-of-war", "Ireland Hill", "As I Walked O'er the Highland Hills", "Sweet Island's Hill"
- 662. "The Press Gang", "Man of War"
- 663. "Fountain of Christ's Blood"
- 664. "The Bonny Bunch of Roses" (Laws J5)
- 665. "The Birmingham Boys"
- 666. "Widdliecombe Fair", "Monaghan Fair"
- 667. "Shanty Boys in the Pine", "Jim Lockwood"
- 668. "Peter Emberly" (Laws C27)
- 669. "River in the Pines" (Laws dC33)
- 670. "(The) Shanty Boy (Wins)", "Trenton Town", "(The Shanty Boy and) the Mossback", "The Farmer's Son and the Shanty Boy", "Shanty Boys", "The Farmer and the Shanty Boy", "Shanty Boy Farmer Boy", "Shanty Girl", "The Shanty-boy and the Farmer's Son", "The Moss-back and the Shanty Boy", "The Shanty Boy and the Farmer"
- 671. "The Journeyman Tailor", "The Jolly Stage Driver" (Laws O13)
- 672. "One Night As I Lay On My Bed"
- 673. "Bold Manning" (Laws D15)
- 674. "Katie Mora" (Laws N24)
- 675. "The Merchant's Daughter", "Constant Farmer's Son" (Laws M33)
- 676. "Dennis O'Reilly"
- 677. "Wild Colonial Boy" (Laws L20)
- 678. "Mrs. McGrath", "Mrs. McGraw", "My Son Ted", "My Son John", "The Sergeant and Mrs. McGrath"
- 679. "The Eumerella Shore"
- 680. "Grey Mare", "Roger the Miller" (Laws P8)
- 681. "Lowlands"
- 682. "The First Nowell"
- 683. "The North Country Collier"
- 684. No record
- 685. "The Girl I Left Behind Me", "Blyth Camps"
- 686. "Oxen Ploughing"
- 687. "Spanish Ladies"
- 688. "The Streams of Lovely Nancy"
- 689. "Wicklow Rangers", "The Girl I Left Behind Me"
- 690. "The Dolphin", "Lord Exmouth", "The Warlike Seaman"
- 691. "Bob Sims", "Logan County Jailhouse", "Sporting Cowboy" (Laws E17)
- 692. "The Death of J.B. Marcum" (Laws E19)
- 693. "Henry Green" (Laws F14)
- 694. "Fuller and Warren" (Laws F16)
- 695. "Ellen Flannery", "Floyd Frasier" (Laws F19)
- 696. "Little Mary Phagan" (Laws F20)
- 697. "Charlie Lawson", "The Lawson Murder" (Laws F35)
- 698. "The Mines of Avondale" (Laws G6)
- 699. "Ten Thousand Miles Away from Home", "Western Hobo" (Laws H2)
- 700. "I Saw Three Ships", "The Sunny Bank"

=== 701 to 800 ===
- 701. "New Years Carol", "Awake Awake"
- 702. "The Moon Shines Bright"
- 703. "Blow Boys Blow"
- 704. "One More Day"
- 705. "Silver Jack" (Laws C24)
- 706. "The Banks of Little Eau Plain", "Johnny Murphy" (Laws C2)
- 707. "The Cumberland's Crew" (Laws A18)
- 708. "Gay Spanish Maid" (Laws K16)
- 709. "The White Cockade (song)|The White Cockade"
- 710. "Away to California", "The Wisconsin Emigrant" (Laws B25)
- 711. "Silver Dagger"
- 712. "Wreck of the Six Wheeler", "Jay Gould's Daughter" (Laws I16 / Laws dl25)
- 713. "Mary's Dream" (Laws K20)
- 714. "Mantle of Green" (Laws N38)
- 715. "Beaver Creek"
- 716. "The Quaker's Courtship"
- 717. No record
- 718. No record
- 719. "The Old Maid's Song"
- 720. No record
- 721. "Drunkard's Hell"
- 722. "Husband's Dream"
- 723. "The Drunkard's Lone Child"
- 724. "For Seven Long Years I've Been Married"
- 725. "Little Brown Jug"
- 726. No record
- 727. "When I Die", "Grease My Heels"
- 728. "Old Adam", "When Adam was first created"
- 729. "Charlie", "Weevily Wheat", "O'er the Water to Charlie"
- 730. "Three Dukes", "The Dilsey Dolsey Officer"
- 731. "Jenny Jenkins"
- 732. No record
- 733. "The Jolly Miller"
- 734. "In and Out the Window", "Round and Round the Village"
- 735. "Pretty Little Pink", "Green Coffee"
- 736. "Little Fight in Mexico"
- 737. No record
- 738. "Buffalo Gals"
- 739. "Sally Goodin"
- 740. "I Love Coffee"
- 741. "Uncle Joe Cut off His Toe"
- 742. "The Grand Old Duke of York"
- 743. No record
- 744. No record
- 745. "Old McDonald Had a Farm", "The Farmyard", "The Merry Green Fields (of the Lowland)"
- 746. "The Old Woman and Her Pig", "Little Betty Pringle"
- 747. "The Woodpecker", "Bird Song"
- 748. "Jaybird Died with the Whooping Cough"
- 749. No record
- 750. "I Had a Little Sweetheart"
- 751. "The Old Gray Mare"
- 752. "The Jackfish", "Fish on a Hook"
- 753. "Bob Ridley'"
- 754. "Sourwood Mountain"
- 755. No record
- 756. "Red River Valley"
- 757. "Wildwood Flower"
- 758. No record
- 759. "Gum Tree Canoe"
- 760. "See the Train go Round the Bend", "Goodbye My Lover Goodbye", "I Saw the Ship Go Round the Bend"
- 761. "Someone's Tall and Handsome"
- 762. "Bonnie Blue Eyes"
- 763. "I Love Little Willie"
- 764. "Old Grimes"
- 765. "Twenty Years Ago"
- 766. "History of the World", "Walk in the Parlor"
- 767. "Meet Me By Moonlight"
- 768. "May I Sleep in Your Barn Tonight Mister"
- 769. "The Red White and Red" (Laws dA36)
- 770. "Bluebird"
- 771. "John Brown's Body"
- 772. "Sweet Sunny South"
- 773. "The Drummer Boy of Shiloh" (Laws A15)
- 774. "The Titanic"
- 775. "The Ship that Never Returned" (Laws D27)
- 776. "Aunt Sal's Song", "The Bashful Courtship"
- 777. "Wreck of the Old 97"
- 778. "Kingdom Coming", "The Year of Jubilo"
- 779. "Battleship of Maine"
- 780. "Little Sadie"
- 781. "Little Marian Parker" (Laws F33)
- 782. "Give to My Love Nell", "Jack and Joe"
- 783. "Frankie Silver" (Laws E13)
- 784. "Charlie Brook"
- 785. "Dublin Bay"
- 786. "Young Companions", "Bad Company" (Laws E15)
- 787. "White House Blues", "Unlucky Road to Washington"
- 788. "Farewell Dear Roseanna" (Laws M30)
- 789. "I'm Going Back to North Carolina"
- 790. "John Henry" (Laws I1)
- 791. No record
- 792. "My Mistress Came to the Door", "Rap-Tap-Tap", "The Farmer's Servant", "The Thresher in the Barn"
- 793. "The Poacher's Fate", "The Gallant Poacher", "Come All You Lads of High Renown".
- 794. "The Bonnie House of Airlie" (Child 199)
- 795. "The Boyne Water"
- 796. "The Ranger", "Three Huntsmen", "Tom Reynard"
- 797. "Old Roger"
- 798. "Major Andre's Death", "John Paulan", (Laws A2)
- 799. "The Government Claim", "Starving to Death on a Government Claim", "The Lane County Bachelor", "Greer County"
- 800. "Bright Sunny South" (Laws A23)

=== 801 to 900 ===
- 801. No record
- 802. "Tinker, Tailor"
- 803. "Farewell, He"
- 804. No record
- 805. No record
- 806. "Bob of Dumblane"
- 807. "The Ship in Distress"
- 808. "Christmas Drawing Near at Hand"
- 809. "Haul Away Joe", "Haul Away for Rosie"
- 810. "Clear the Track", "Let the Bullgine Run"
- 811. "The Valiant Sailor", "The Sailor's Wish", "Polly on the Shore"
- 812. "Rosebuds in June", "Sheepshearer Song"
- 813. "Fire Down Below"
- 814. "So Handy", "Hand Over Hand"
- 815. "The Angel Gabriel", "Lazerus", "Come All You Worthy Christian Men"
- 816. "The Blacksmith"
- 817. "Sweet Moll"
- 818. "Three Lovely Lasses in Bannion"
- 819. "Bonnet So Blue"
- 820. "Burns and Highland Mary" (Laws O34)
- 821. "What Are Little Boys Made Of?"
- 822. "Durant Jail"
- 823. "The Good Old Rebel"
- 824. "Lonesome Road"
- 825. "Liza Jane"
- 826. "What'll I Do with the Baby-o", "Georgie"
- 827. "Git Along, Little Dogies"
- 828. "The Chapter of Cheats", "Every Man is a Rogue"
- 829. "Rakish Young Fellow"
- 830. "The Heights of Alma" (Laws J10)
- 831. "The Bunch of Rushes"
- 832. "Oh No No", "Bonny Glenshee"
- 833. "The Mower"
- 834. "The Blind Sailors" (Laws K5)
- 835. "Captain James", "The Captain's Apprentice"
- 836. "Cindy"
- 837. "Shoemaker's Song", "The Cobbler"
- 838. "The Dreary Dreary Life" (Laws B16)
- 839. "Come Home, Father"
- 840. No record
- 841. No record
- 842. "I am a Driver"
- 843. "Come All Ye Lonely Lovers"
- 844. "The Coal Creek Explosion", "Shut Up In the Mines of Cold Creek" (Laws G9)
- 845. "Johnnie My Man"
- 846. "Slighted Nansy", "Nobody Coming to Marry Me"
- 847. "Joe Moggins"
- 848. "What's the Life of a Man?"
- 849. "Bewick and Graham" (Child 211)
- 850. "My Father Kept a Horse"
- 851. "You Subjects of England", "William Tayor the Poacher", "Keepers and Poachers"
- 852. "Mandi Went to Puv the Grai", "All Through Me Rakli"
- 853. "The King and the Forester", "King William and the Keeper"
- 854. "Sweet Blooming Lavender", "Lavender Cry"
- 855. "Joy After Sorrow", "Raking the Hay"
- 856. "Death of Black Bess"
- 857. Ca' the yowes to the knowes, "The Ewe Lamb"
- 858. "I Wonder What's Keeping My True Love Tonight", "I'm Sorry", "The Rue and Thyme", "Green Grass it Grows Bonny"
- 859. No record
- 860. "Sheffield Park"
- 861. "She Moved Through the Fair"
- 862. "The Jolly Driver"
- 863. "The Jolly Tinker"
- 864. "The Laird of the Dainty Doonby"
- 865. "Baffled Knight"
- 866. "The Overgate"
- 867. "The Brewer Laddie"
- 868. "Countryman's Ramble in Cheapside", "Up to the Rigs"
- 869. "Dashing Away with the Smoothing Iron"
- 870. "My Husband's Got No Courage In Him"
- 871. No record
- 872. "Dick Darby the Cobbler"
- 873. "The Husbandman and the Servingman"
- 874. "The Threshing Song"
- 875. "The Oyster Girl" (Laws Q13)
- 876. "Hard, Hard Times"
- 877. "Six Jolly Miners"
- 878. "The Echoing Horn"
- 879. "The Industrious Farmer", "The Sheepsheering Song"
- 880. "Fathom the Bowl"
- 881. "Campbell the Driver", "Three English Blades"
- 882. "Drink Old England Dry", "Cannons"
- 883. "Nancy Whisky"
- 884. "Card Playing Song", "Tom Brown"
- 885. "To Be a Good Companion", "The Sussex Toast"
- 886. "The Wonderful Crocodile"
- 887. "The Farmyard Song"
- 888. "The Buchan Miller"
- 889. "Banks of the Bann"
- 890. "Maxwell's Doom", "Ewing Brooks" (Laws E12)
- 891. "The Carrion Crow"
- 892. "The Merchant's Daughter of Bristol"
- 893. "Old Erin Far Away", "The Dying Soldier" (Laws J7)
- 894. "The Maid and Wife"
- 895. "The Lass's Wardrobe"
- 896. "The Gallows" (Laws L11)
- 897. "The Folkestone Murder"
- 898. "The Parcel from a Lady"
- 899. "Underneath Her Apron", "Gathering Rushes in the Month of May"
- 900. "Little Beggarman"

=== 901 to 1000 ===
- 901. "The Lost Lady Found" (Laws Q31)
- 902. "Shooting Goshen's Cocks Up", "The Poaching Song", "Row-Dow-Dow"
- 903. "The Prentice Boy" (Laws M12)
- 904. "High Germany"
- 905. "Little Boy Billee"
- 906. "Roll on Silvery Moon", "Bonnie Moon"
- 907. "Peggy and the Soldier", "The Old Soldier", "A New Ballad of the Souldier and Peggy" (Laws P13)
- 908. No record
- 909. No record
- 910. "Besom Maker"
- 911. "Siúil A Rún"
- 912. "Fisherman's Boy" (Laws Q29)
- 913. "Jolly Roving Tar" (Laws O27)
- 914. "I Sowed Some Seeds", "The Hostess' Daughter", "London Town"
- 915. "Old Paint"
- 916. "Lovely Jimmy", "In Bristol There Lived a Fair Lady"
- 917. "The Watchet Sailor" (Laws P4)
- 918. "Monkey Turned Barber" (Laws Q14)
- 919. "Jack Tar on Shore" (Laws K39)
- 920. "Johnny Galocher"
- 921. "The Collier Lad"
- 922. "Lawyer Lee", "The Lawyer Bold"
- 923. "Paddy Haggerty's Breeches"
- 924. "The Dreadnaught"
- 925. "On Board the Kangaroo"
- 926. "A Hundred Years Ago"
- 927. "Homeward Bound"
- 928. "Liverpool Judies"
- 929. "Ballytrapeen", "Swansea Gals"
- 930. "He Back She Back"
- 931. "Shuile Agra", "Blood Red Roses"
- 932. "Heave Away Cheerily"
- 933. "Robin Hood and the Ranger" (Child 131)
- 934. "Bucking Bronco" (Laws B15)
- 935. "Grat for Gruel"
- 936. "The Nativity", "Sherburne"
- 937. "Jone O'Grinfield", "Four Loom Weaver"
- 938. "A Bucket of Mountain Dew"
- 939. "Robin Tamson's Dochter" (Laws O12)
- 940. "Sad Condition", "Old Jim Lane"
- 941. "Rye Whiskey", "I'll Eat When I'm Hungry"
- 942. "Cotton-Eyed Joe"
- 943. "Birmingham Jail"
- 944. "The Barley Mow"
- 945. "Young Willie", "Valentine's Day"
- 946. "Going to Chelsea"
- 947. "The Sea Captain" (Laws Q12)
- 948. "Fair Floro", "The Unkind Shepherdess"
- 949. "The Storm"
- 950. "The Banks of the Nile" (Laws N9)
- 951. "Captain Mansfield's Fight with the Turks at Sea", "The Twenty Fourth of February", "The Good Luck Ship"
- 952. "Single Life", "The Lady of Greenwich", "Jolly Sailor"
- 953. "Willie Graham"
- 954. "Flash Company", "The Wandering Girl"
- 955. "Young Barnwell"
- 956. "The Spotted Cow"
- 957. "(Flora) (the) Lily of the West" (Laws P29)
- 958. "The Drums They Play for War" (Laws N9)
- 959. "The Sailor and the Shepherdess", "The Sailor's Courtship" (Laws O8)
- 960. "Waterloo" (Laws N32)
- 961. "Brave Wolfe"
- 962. "Pretty Susan the Pride of Kildare" (Laws P6)
- 963. "Battle of Shannon and Chesapeake" (Laws J22)
- 964. "County Gaol"
- 965. "Timothy", "As I Was a Walking", "The Fair Maid"
- 966. "Go From My Window"
- 967. "Paul Jones" (Laws A4)
- 968. "Bedlam City", "Do You See Billy Coming"
- 969. "Limbo", "The Prodigal Son"
- 970. "The Whaler's Song", "Greenland"
- 971. "The Stonecutter Boy/The Bricklayer's Dream", "The Brickster"
- 972. "Starry Night for a Ramble"
- 973. "The Foggy Dew"
- 974. "Plaster", "Sheep's Skin and Beeswax"
- 975. "Jack Stewart", "Man You Don't Meet Every Day"
- 976. No record
- 977. "Willie the Weeper"
- 978. "Kenny Wagner" (Laws E7)
- 979. No record
- 980. "The Fourteenth of July" (Laws J19)
- 981. "Naomi Wise" (Laws F31)
- 982. "Bold Belfast Shoemaker" (Laws J15)
- 983. "Patrick Shean" (Laws J11)
- 984. "The Bold Pirate" (Laws K30)
- 985. "Rigs O' Rye" (Laws O11)
- 986. "Cupid the Pretty Plowboy" (Laws O7)
- 987. "Green Mossy Banks" (Laws O15)
- 988. "The Slighted Soldier" (Laws O16)
- 989. "Bonnie Wee Widow" (Laws O18)
- 990. "A Man in Love He Feels No Cold" (Laws O20)
- 991. "The Most Unconstant of Young Men", "Nancy's Courtship", "True Lovers' Discussion" (Laws O22)
- 992. "Kate Avourneen", "Barney and Kate" (Laws O21)
- 993. "The Constant Lovers", "The Sailor and the Farmer's Daughter" (Laws O41)
- 994. "Lady and the Farmer's Son" (Laws O40)
- 995. "The Lovely Banks of the Boyne" (Laws P22)
- 996. "All On Account of a Bold Lover Gay" (Laws P23)
- 997. "The Perjured Maid", "A Gentleman of Exeter", "A Ring of Gold They Broke in Two" (Laws P32)
- 998. "Susannah Clargy" (Laws P33)
- 999. "Dobbin's Flowery Vale" (Laws O29)
- 1000. "The Bold Privateer" (Laws O32)

=== 1001 to 1100 ===
- 1001. "Fair Fanny Moore" (Laws O38)
- 1002. "Jenny Dear" (Laws P11)
- 1003. "As I Walked Out One May Morning", "A Day Too Young" (Laws P19)
- 1004. "Battle of the Ladle" (Laws Q7)
- 1005. "Major's Britches", "The Miller and the Major" (Laws Q10)
- 1006. "The Old Dyer", "The Dog in the Closet" (Laws Q11)
- 1007. "Courting in the Kitchen" (Laws Q16)
- 1008. "Pat Malone Forgot He Was Dead", "The Irish Wake" (Laws Q18)
- 1009. "Finnegan's Wake" (Laws Q17)
- 1010. "Doran's Ass" (Laws Q19)
- 1011. "Our Ship She Lays in Harbour"
- 1012. "Creeping Jane" (Laws Q23)
- 1013. "Father Tom O'Neale" (Laws Q25)
- 1014. "The High Blantyre Explosion"
- 1015. "The Miner's Doom" (Laws Q36)
- 1016. "The London Prentice" (Laws Q38)
- 1017. "Devilish Mary" (Laws Q4)
- 1018. "The Building of Solomon's Temple" (Laws Q39)
- 1019. "The North Star", "The Merchant's Son and the Parson's Daughter" (Laws M21)
- 1020. "Gragal Machree" (Laws M23)
- 1021. "The Tan-yard Side" (Laws M28)
- 1022. "The Plymouth Tragedy" (Laws M29)
- 1023. "Father Tom O'Neill"
- 1024. "Barley Rakings"
- 1025. "Blow Away Ye Morning Breezes"
- 1026. "Chase the Buffalo"
- 1027. "Bushes and Briers"
- 1028. "Catch Me If You Can"
- 1029. "Come All You Lads and Lasses"
- 1030. "The Croppy Boy" (Laws J14)
- 1031. "Death and the Lady"
- 1032. "The Death of Parker"
- 1033. "Dicky the Miller"
- 1034. "Let Him Go Let Him Tarry", "Fare Thee Well Cold Winter"
- 1035. "Fare Thee Well My Dearest Dear"
- 1036. "Four and Twenty Tailors"
- 1037. "The Furze Field", "The Jolly Huntsman's Call"
- 1038. "Gosport Beach"
- 1039. "Gossip Joan"
- 1040. "Green Bushes" (Laws P2)
- 1041. "Hunting the Hare"
- 1042. "I am a Brisk Young Sailor"
- 1043. "I am a Coachman", "Jack of All Trades"
- 1044. "Nottamun Town"
- 1045. "I Rode My Little Horse", "The London Rover"
- 1046. "Holmfirth Anthem", "Pratty Flowers", "Through the Groves", "Abroad for Pleasure"
- 1047. "Jenny Jones"
- 1048. "Jolly Old Hawk"
- 1049. "Love is Pleasing"
- 1050. "The Derbyshire Miller", "Matthew the Miller", "My Tipper-to-billy-go-lario"
- 1051. "May and December"
- 1052. "The Molecatcher"
- 1053. No record
- 1054. "New Garden Fields"
- 1055. "The Shepherd's Wife", "Shepherd, O Shepherd"
- 1056. "Faithful Lovers"
- 1057. "Old Mother Crawley"
- 1058. "Bristol Town"
- 1059. "I Must Live All Alone", "As I was A-Walking"
- 1060. "The Farmer's Daughter and the Gay Ploughboy"
- 1061. "Wealthy Farmer's Son"
- 1062. "Belfast Mountains"
- 1063. "The Lady and the Farmer"
- 1064. "Poor Murdered Woman"
- 1065. "The Hampshire Mummers' Christmas Carol", "God Sent for Us the Sunday"
- 1066. "The Mummers' Carol", "God Bless the Master"
- 1067. "Jovial Ranger"
- 1068. "Yarmouth is a Pretty Town"
- 1069. "Oh Dickey, Oh Dickey"
- 1070. "The Virgin's Wreath"
- 1071. "A New Flounce to your Gown", "Weigh Anchor", "Little Miss Nancy"
- 1072. "The Hawthorn Bush"
- 1073. "Turkey Rhubarb"
- 1074. "The Maid's Lament"
- 1075. "The Wheel of Fortune"
- 1076. "Tartar Drum", "Follow the Drum"
- 1077. "Gaol Song"
- 1078. "On Christmas Day It Happened So"
- 1079. "The Cruise of the Calabar"
- 1080. "Joe the Carrier Lad", "Jim the Carter's Lad"
- 1081. "The American Stranger"
- 1082. "Bold Nevison the Highwayman"
- 1083. "Brigg Fair"
- 1084. "Free and Easy to Jog Along", "Free and Easy"
- 1085. "Gown so Green"
- 1086. "Howden Fair", "Weyhill Fair"
- 1087. "British Waterside (The Jolly Sailor)"
- 1088. "The Jolly Waggoner"
- 1089. "Bill Scrimshaw the Scotsman", "The Lincolnshire Wrestler", "The Wrestling Match"
- 1090. "The Spinning Wheel"
- 1091. No record
- 1092. "Come All Ye Bold Countrymen"
- 1093. "The Nightingale"
- 1094. "The Grey Goose and Gander"
- 1095. "Highland Mary"
- 1096. "Braes of Strathblane"
- 1097. No record
- 1098. "Mammy's Pet"
- 1099. "Maggie's Smile"
- 1100. No record

=== 1101 to 1200 ===
- 1101. "Glowerowerem", "Bonny Balcairn"
- 1102. "Johnny Todd", "Dig for Silver", "Johnnie Johnston"
- 1103. "Captain Death"
- 1104. "Outward Bound"
- 1105. "Just As the Tide Was Flowing"
- 1106. "The Plains of Waterloo" (Laws J3)
- 1107. "Spence Broughton"
- 1108. "Awful Execution of John Bird Bell"
- 1109. "The Flyingdale Fox Hunt"
- 1110. "White Hare"
- 1111. "The Roving Heckler Lad"
- 1112. "The Rover"
- 1113. "Down in the Village", "Shepherd Boy"
- 1114. "Down by the Derwent Side"
- 1115. "Spencer the Rover"
- 1116. "I Love Sixpence"
- 1117. "With Henry Hunt We'll Go"
- 1118. "The Foggy Dew"
- 1119. No record
- 1120. "Stolen Child"
- 1121. "Remember the Poor"
- 1122. "Christ was Born in Bethlehem", "Down Came an Angel"
- 1123. "Clean Pea Straw", "The Best Bed's a Featherbed"
- 1124. No record
- 1125. "Sally's Love for a Young Man", "The Jaunting Car"
- 1126. "Chainmaker Lad"
- 1127. "He's Only a Chimney Sweeper"
- 1128. "The Miller and the Lass"
- 1129. "Jolly Joe the Collier's Son"
- 1130. "Poll and Nancy Hogan"
- 1131. "The Dudley Boys"
- 1132. "The Battle of Waterloo"
- 1133. "When You Get Up in the Morning"
- 1134. "Stop that Clock"
- 1135. "Early in the Morning"
- 1136. "The Old Miner"
- 1137. "No Irish Need Apply"
- 1138. No record
- 1139. "Rakish Young Fellow"
- 1140. "The Fox and the Hare"
- 1141. No record
- 1142. "Valentine Chant"
- 1143. "Mowing Match Song"
- 1144. "Lace Tell"
- 1145. "The Magpie"
- 1146. "The Gallant Hussar"
- 1147. "Jerusalem Cuckoo"
- 1148. "McCafferty"
- 1149. "When Frost is on the Pumpkin"
- 1150. No record
- 1151. "Unfortunate Shepherdess"
- 1152. "Father's Advice"
- 1153. "Kiss Me Quick"
- 1154. "Parson and the Clerk"
- 1155. "Lincolnshire Wedding Song", "The Wedding Song"
- 1156. "Labouring Man"
- 1157. "The Sons of Albion"
- 1158. "Rochester Lass"
- 1159. "Rejoice the Promis'd Savior's Come", "First Carol"
- 1160. No record
- 1161. "Reilly's Daughter", "The One-eyed Riley"
- 1162. "The Bonny Labouring Boy"
- 1163. "The Egloshayle Ringers"
- 1164. "Old King Cole"
- 1165. "The Drunkard"
- 1166. "General Munroe"
- 1167. "Come All Ye Brisk Young Bachelors"
- 1168. "The Cabin Boy", "The Rich Lady Gay"
- 1169. No record
- 1170. "The Trees are All Bare", "Christmas Song"
- 1171. "'Twas in the Year of 1835"
- 1172. "We'll Go A-Hunting Today"
- 1173. "The Wild Rover"
- 1174. "The Wreck of the Northfleet", "Father Put Me in the Boat"
- 1175. "Good Morning, Pretty Maid"
- 1176. No record
- 1177. "Hunting Song"
- 1178. "The Old Farmer"
- 1179. "Freemasons' Song"
- 1180. "Four Seasons of the Year"
- 1181. "The Sportsman's Game", "Somersetshire Hunting Song"
- 1182. "The Fox Chase"
- 1183. "The Barbel"
- 1184. "Nothing at All"
- 1185. "Bonny Light Horseman"
- 1186. "Jolly Young Waterman"
- 1187. "Britons Strike Home"
- 1188. "Polka Mad"
- 1189. "Grand Conversation on Napoleon"
- 1190. "The Churchwarden's Song"
- 1191. "Ye Mariners All", "A Jug of This"
- 1192. "Rosin the Bow", "Old Rosin the Beau"
- 1193. "The New-Mown Hay"
- 1194. "Old Bedstead"
- 1195. "Grandmother's Chair"
- 1196. "The Body-Snatcher's Trade"
- 1197. "A Poor Lonely Widow"
- 1198. "The Modest Maid"
- 1199. "Blow the Winds I-o"
- 1200. "The Female Smuggler"

=== 1201 to 1300 ===
- 1201. No record
- 1202. "Rose in June"
- 1203. No record
- 1204. "Winchester Gaol"
- 1205. "The Brisk Young Ploughboy", "The Brave Ploughboy"
- 1206. "Hard Times of Old England"
- 1207. "Shepherds Arise"
- 1208. "The Shepherd's Song"
- 1209. "Dame Durden"
- 1210. "Now All You Lads"
- 1211. No record
- 1212. "Rumpsy Bumpsy"
- 1213. "Charming Molly"
- 1214. "Come All You Bold Britons"
- 1215. "The Shepherd Adonis"
- 1216. "Sportsmen Arouse", "Innocent Hare"
- 1217. "Sweep Chimney Sweep"
- 1218. "The Rose of Allandale" (Charles Jefferys, Sidney Nelson)
- 1219. "Suit of Corduroy"
- 1220. "Thousands or More"
- 1221. "The Battle of Alma"
- 1222. "Softly the Night"
- 1223. "British Soldier's Grave"
- 1224. "Essex Hawkey Encore", "Jolly Good Song"
- 1225. "Corydon and Phillis"
- 1226. "The Shearer's Song"
- 1227. "A-Begging Buttermilk", "To Curb Rising Thoughts"
- 1228. "Good Company"
- 1229. "Music and Wine"
- 1230. "How Happy is the Man"
- 1231. "How I Could Ride", "Dumy Dum Darie"
- 1232. "Here's a Health to King George"
- 1233. "Now So Merry We Have Met"
- 1234. "Come Landlord Fill the Flowing Bowl"
- 1235. "Here's a Health to All Good Lasses"
- 1236. "Come You Friends of a Social Life"
- 1237. "The Bonny Christ Church Bells", "Hark the Bonny"
- 1238. "Come My Lads"
- 1239. "John Peel"
- 1240. "Old Towler"
- 1241. "Chivvy Chivvy O"
- 1242. "Tally I-o In the Morning"
- 1243. "Hark Hark Away to the Downs"
- 1244. "The Gipsies' Glee", "What a Merry Life We Gipsies Lead"
- 1245. "Days When We Went a Gypsying"
- 1246. "The Lass of Richmond Hill"
- 1247. "Garland of Love"
- 1248. "Old Simon"
- 1249. "Three Jolly Bachelors"
- 1250. "Fairlop Fair"
- 1251. "Ere Round the Huge Oak"
- 1252. "The Social Fellows"
- 1253. "Push About the Pitcher"
- 1254. "The Rich and the Poor"
- 1255. "Toast"
- 1256. No record
- 1257. "The Pretty Chambermaid"
- 1258. No record
- 1259. "Gipsy King"
- 1260. "Off to Flanders", "The Coward"
- 1261. "The Cluster of Nuts"
- 1262. "In Former Times"
- 1263. "My Old Wife"
- 1264. "The Sowers' Song"
- 1265. "A-Courting I Went", "Nothing Else to Do"
- 1266. "The Fatal Ramilies"
- 1267. No record
- 1268. "Eynsham Poaching Song", "Southrop Poaching Song", "The Three Poachers"
- 1269. "Ground For the Floor"
- 1270. "My Cottage Well Thatched with Straw"
- 1271. "Village Fair"
- 1272. "The Shepherd and the Maiden"
- 1273. "Dainty Davy in the Hog Tub", "Pig's Meat Courtship", "It's Once I Courted", "Swim for Love in the Hog-Tub", "She Bundled Me Into the Hog Tub"
- 1274. "Blue Tail Fly"
- 1275. "The Recruiting Sergeant"
- 1276. "The Maid of the Mill"
- 1277. "The Weaver's Daughter"
- 1278. No record
- 1279. "O Dear What Can the Matter Be", "Bunch of Blue Ribbons"
- 1280. "We'll Sit Upon the Gate"
- 1281. "Brave Old Oak"
- 1282. "All Around the Room"
- 1283. "All Among the Barley" (Elizabeth Stirling)
- 1284. "The Snail"
- 1285. "Bonnie Hodge"
- 1286. "Captain Grant"
- 1287. "Long Tail Blue"
- 1288. "Betsy Baker"
- 1289. "There Was a Little Man"
- 1290. "Three Flies"
- 1291. "The Football Match"
- 1292. "John Appleby"
- 1293. "I'm His Only Daughter"
- 1294. "Harvest Home"
- 1295. "What Can a Young Lassie"
- 1296. "The Pigeon"
- 1297. "The Wee Wifie", "The Old Woman Tossed Up in a Blanket"
- 1298. "From the Brow of the Hill"
- 1299. "Hark the Rock", "Cease Ye Stormy Winds to Blow", "The Wanderer"
- 1300. "Needlecases"

=== 1301 to 1400 ===
- 1301. "Love Farewell", "The Harvest Shearin'", "John and Molly Lay A-Musing"
- 1302. "Soldier Boy for Me", "The Railroader"
- 1303. "Bold Robin Hood"
- 1304. "The Beggar Girl"
- 1305. "Generous Farmer"
- 1306. "My Own Dear Home"
- 1307. "Leather Bottle"
- 1308. "The Down-Hill of Life", "Tomorrow"
- 1309. "The Mailman and the Miller", "The Maltman and the Highwayman"
- 1310. "The Old Woman Drinking her Tea"
- 1311. "The Wooden Watch"
- 1312. "Jarvis the Coachman('s Happy Deliverance from the Gibbet)"
- 1313. "The Cruel Gamekeeper", "The Staffordshire Tragedy"
- 1314. "The Devil and the Hackney Coachman", "Tamarro"
- 1315. "The Female Robber"
- 1316. "Struggle for the Breeches"
- 1317. "Preaching for Bacon"
- 1318. "Two Wenches at Once"
- 1319. "George Ridler's Oven"
- 1320. "Life Let us Cherish"
- 1321. "Dicky Milburn", "Little Dicky Whilburn"
- 1322. "Robin Hood and Little John" (Child 125)
- 1323. "The Saucy Light Dragoon"
- 1324. "Follow Me (To the Greenwood Tree)"
- 1325. "The Age of Man and Woman", "The Four Ages of Mankind", "An Ape Lion Fox and Ass"
- 1326. "A Grasshopper and a Fly"
- 1327. "The Cobbler's Bill"
- 1328. "The Miser"
- 1329. "Old Johnny Boker"
- 1330. "When Moggy by the Fire Sat"
- 1331. "Morris Fragment"
- 1332. "Money Makes the Mare Go"
- 1333. "'Twas You Sir"
- 1334. "Poor Johnny's Dead"
- 1335. "Chairs to Mend", "If I'd As Much Money", "Chair-Mender's Cry"
- 1336. "Come Hither Tom"
- 1337. "William and Jonathan"
- 1338. "Old Simeon"
- 1339. "Home to Dinner"
- 1340. No record
- 1341. "Fill the Foaming Horn up High"
- 1342. "Well Rung Tom"
- 1343. "Ill Fares the Family"
- 1344. "Fill a Glass of Sherry"
- 1345. "Slaves to the World"
- 1346. "Hail Smiling Morn"
- 1347. "Roundelay"
- 1348. "Music and Love"
- 1349. "Sweet Kitty"
- 1350. "The Twa Magicians" (Child 44)
- 1351. "The Bold Richard"
- 1352. No record
- 1353. "Now the Winter is Over", "The Ploughboy"
- 1354. "Young William of the Royal Waggon Train"
- 1355. "There Goes a Man (Just Gone Along)", "The Gaol Song"
- 1356. No record
- 1357. "Song of Want", "Truth Laid Open", "The Brewer without Any Barm"
- 1358. No record
- 1359. "Bobby Shafto"
- 1360. "Joseph and his Wedded Wife"
- 1361. "The Lord of Life"
- 1362. "Over the Hills and the Mountains"
- 1363. No record
- 1364. "The Water of Tyne"
- 1365. "Sally Gray"
- 1366. "The Collier’s Rant"
- 1367. "The Oak and the Ash"
- 1368. "Green Gravel"
- 1369. "There Was a Pig Went Out to Dig"
- 1370. "The Cheshire Cheese", "The Cheshireman and the Spaniard"
- 1371. "Ny Kirree Fo-sniaghtey"
- 1372. "The Spider"
- 1373. "Now Robin Lend Me Thy Bow"
- 1374. "In Bethlehem City"
- 1375. "The Reaphook and the Sickle"
- 1376. "Turmot Hoer"
- 1377. "Poor Mary (Sits A-Weeping)"
- 1378. "A Virgin Most Pure"
- 1379. "When Sheapshearing's Done", "Gloucester Feast Song"
- 1380. "Oats Peas Beans and Barley Grow"
- 1381. "Green Grass", "A Dis a Dis a Green Grass",
- 1382. "The Dashing Lad from Buckingham"
- 1383. "Venus and Adonis"
- 1384. "Bob-Tailed Mare", "The Carter's Health"
- 1385. "Sheep-Shearing Song"
- 1386. "I'm A Man that's Done Wrong (By My Parents)", "The Cast Out"
- 1387. "Adam and Eve"
- 1388. "My Johnny Was a Shoemaker"
- 1389. "Bobbing Around"
- 1390. "The Frightened Husband", "Marco and Pedro"
- 1391. "The Crystal Spring"
- 1392. "Horse Racing Song"
- 1393. "Fanny Blair"
- 1394. "We Poor Labouring Men"
- 1395. "The Cuckoo"
- 1396. "As Robin was Driving", "Bonny Robin"
- 1397. No record
- 1398. "The Servant Man"
- 1399. "Mick Miles"
- 1400. "The Country Carrier"

=== 1401 to 1500 ===
- 1401. "I Wish They'd Do It Now"
- 1402. "The Beautiful Muff"
- 1403. "No My Love Not I", "The Newfoundland Sailor"
- 1404. "Little Ball of Yarn"
- 1405. "Mr. Noah"
- 1406. "Owd Johnny Walker"
- 1407. "Are You the O'Reilly", "Man all Tattered and Torn"
- 1408. "Rattle Mutton Pie", "Owd Sow T'"
- 1409. "A Country Life for Me"
- 1410. "Round the Lunatic Asylum"
- 1411. "Little Blue Haired Boy"
- 1412. "James MacDonald", "The Longford Murderer"
- 1413. No record
- 1414. "The False Young Man", "In London Town", "In Camden Town", "Floating Down the Tide"
- 1415. "Banks of Inverary"
- 1416. "The Lass of Swansea Town", "Swansea Barracks"
- 1417. "Weddingmore", "Young Ellender"
- 1418. "My Lagan Love"
- 1419. "The Shamrock Shore", "Greencastle Shore"
- 1420. "Slieve Gallion Braes"
- 1421. "Derry so Fair"
- 1422. "My Bonnie Lies over the Ocean"
- 1423. "Betsy of Ballantown Brae" a version of Roud 566
- 1424. "A Ship to Old England Came"
- 1425. No record
- 1426. "Old Brown's Daughter"
- 1427. "Erin's Lovely Home"
- 1428. "The Rolling Main"
- 1429. "William and Phillis"
- 1430. No record
- 1431. "The Wounded Farmer's Son"
- 1432. "The Pleasant Month of May"
- 1433. "The Shepherd and his Fife"
- 1434. "Master Kilby"
- 1435. No record
- 1436. "Henry and Nancy"
- 1437. "Searching for Young Lambs", "As Johnny Walked Out"
- 1438. "Down By a Riverside"
- 1439. "Ruth Butcher"
- 1440. "Household Remedies", "It's a Wonder I'm Alive to Tell This Tale"
- 1441. "Grace Darling"
- 1442. "Dark Arches"
- 1443. "Balaclava"
- 1444. "I'll Hang my Harp on a Willow Tree"
- 1445. "True Lovers", "High Germany", "The King's Commands"
- 1446. "The Carfindo"
- 1447. "Fair Susan"
- 1448. "Pretty Caroline"
- 1449. "Lovely Nancy"
- 1450. "Sailor from Sea"
- 1451. "Boys of Kilkenny"
- 1452. "Darling Boy"
- 1453. "Shannon Side"
- 1454. "Jack the Sailor"
- 1455. "The Shamrock Shore"
- 1456. "Three Pretty Maids"
- 1457. "Tobacco"
- 1458. "The Peeler and the Goat"
- 1459. "I Designed to Say No (But Mistook and Said Yes)", "As I was A-Walking by Yon Shady Grove"
- 1460. "Jone O'Greenfield's Ramble"
- 1461. "On Board of a Ninety-Eight"
- 1462. "Saucy Ploughboy"
- 1463. "Poor Man's Wish"
- 1464. "Bold Robber"
- 1465. "Harry the Tailor"
- 1466. No record
- 1467. No record
- 1468. "The Blacksmith"
- 1469. "A Lincolnshire Shepherd"
- 1470. "Come All You Valiant Shepherds"
- 1471. No record
- 1472. "Tarry Woo"
- 1473. "The Rambling Comber"
- 1474. "All in a Row"
- 1475. "God Speed the Plough"
- 1476. "The New-Fashioned Farmer"
- 1477. "The Mare and the Foal"
- 1478. "Down the Green Groves", "Jealousy", "Young Maria"
- 1479. "At Seventeen Years of Age"
- 1480. "Devil's In the Girl"
- 1481. "The Roast Beef of Old England"
- 1482. "The Old Man's Advice"
- 1483. "I've Lived in Service"
- 1484. "Galstonbury Town"
- 1485. "The Rest of the Day's Your Own"
- 1486. "Gilderoy", "The Curragh of Kildare"
- 1487. "Salisbury Plain"
- 1488. "Lads of Virginia"
- 1489. No record
- 1490. "Crockery Ware"
- 1491. "The Thrashing Machine"
- 1492. "The Ensilver Song"
- 1493. "Betsy Watson"
- 1494. "Comrades"
- 1495. "What a Funny Little Place to Have One"
- 1496. "Wheel Yer Perambulator"
- 1497. "On a Summer's Night"
- 1498. "Flanagan's Band", "Drums Went Bang"
- 1499. "Old Shep" (Red Foley and Arthur Williams)
- 1500. "Down By the Old Mill Stream"

=== 1501 to 1600 ===
- 1501. "The London Prentice Boy"
- 1502. "I Likes a Drop of Good Beer"
- 1503. "Christians Awake", "Awake Rejoice and Sing", "Egypt"
- 1504. "A Sailor in the North Country"
- 1505. "My Father Gave Me", "A Bowl, A Bottle, A Dish, And a Ladle"
- 1506. "Cuckoo's Nest" (see also Roud 5407)
- 1507. "Come All You Young Ladies and Gentlemen"
- 1508. "The Wooden Leg'd Parson"
- 1509. No record
- 1510. "I'm A Young Man From the Country"
- 1511. "The Rotherham Statues"
- 1512. "Good English Ale" (see also Roud 2414)
- 1513. "Home From the Fair"
- 1514. "Benjamin Bowmaneer"
- 1515. "The Bell Ringing"
- 1516. "Shrove Tuesday Song"
- 1517. "The Mallard"
- 1518. "As Shepherds Watched their Fleecy Care"
- 1519. "The Keeper and The Doe"
- 1520. "Hal an Tow"
- 1521. "The Diggers' Song"
- 1522. "Lasses Get Your Rakes Ready", "Haytime's Coming"
- 1523. "Down in Yon Forest"
- 1524. "The Band O' Shearers"
- 1525. "Not a Swan on the Lake"
- 1526. "It Happened On a Day"
- 1527. "The Hash O' Bennagok"
- 1528. "The Butcher and the Tailor's Wife"
- 1529. "Blackwell Merry Night"
- 1530. "Lily"
- 1531. "The Rambler from Clare"
- 1532. "The Maid and the Magpie"
- 1533. "Susan's Adventures in a Man of War"
- 1534. "Riding Down to Portsmouth"
- 1535. "King Roger"
- 1536. "Geordie Gill", "Geordie Fair"
- 1537. "Edward Gayden", "Edward Jorgen"
- 1538. "Napoleon's Dream"
- 1539. "Lovely on the Water"
- 1540. "The Trotting Horse"
- 1541. "Watercress Girl"
- 1542. "The Best Man Here"
- 1543. "It Wast Just Against the Cheshire Gate"
- 1544. "Duke William's Gamble"
- 1545. "The Ploughboy's Dream"
- 1546. "'Twas On an April Morning"
- 1547. No record
- 1548. "The Pelican"
- 1549. "Lost Child Found"
- 1550. "Good Morning Sir"
- 1551. "Righteous Joseph"
- 1552. "Nelson's Monument"
- 1553. "Daring Highwayman"
- 1554. "The Lass of London City"
- 1555. "Dear Irish Boy"
- 1556. "Jockey and Jenny"
- 1557. "The Courtship of Willie and Peggie"
- 1558. "As I was A-Walking"
- 1559. "Eli Sikes"
- 1560. "I'll Gar Our Gudeman Trow"
- 1561. "Sorry the Day I Was Married"
- 1562. "The Cartmell Hunting Song"
- 1563. "Poor Tom", "Who Knocks There", "A Harvest Song"
- 1564. No record
- 1565. No record
- 1566. "Elwina of Waterloo"
- 1567. "The Death of John Lee"
- 1568. "The Shooting Gallery"
- 1569. "My Love He is a Sailor Boy"
- 1570. "Whistle Daughter Whistle", "Whistle Whistle Aul Wife"
- 1571. "Bridgwater Fair"
- 1572. "Poor Man's Labour"
- 1573. "Beggars and Ballad Singers"
- 1574. "Bold Nelson's Praise"
- 1575. "The Isle of France"
- 1576. No record
- 1577. No record
- 1578. "Swarth Fell Rocks"
- 1579. "Robbie and Grannie"
- 1580. "James Waller the Poacher"
- 1581. "Once There was a Pretty Maid"
- 1582. "Sheep Shearing"
- 1583. "The Shannon and Chesapeake"
- 1584. "New Year's Song"
- 1585. No record
- 1586. "Merry Tom of All Trades", "Get Money at Every Deadlift"
- 1587. "The Breeches"
- 1588. "My Wife and Breeches"
- 1589. "Be Quick For I'm in Haste"
- 1590. No record
- 1591. "Cis and Harry"
- 1592. "Roger and Dolly"
- 1593. "The Maiden's Complaint"
- 1594. "The Little Carpenter"
- 1595. "Lumps of Pudding"
- 1596. "The Clown's Courtship"
- 1597. "Harvest Song"
- 1598. "Old Astrologer"
- 1599. "A Child's Calendar"
- 1600. "Collin's Ghost"

=== 1601 to 1700 ===
- 1601. "The Comfort of Man"
- 1602. "I Don't Think Much of You"
- 1603. "The Farmer's Toast", "The Jolly Farmer"
- 1604. No record
- 1605. "My Charming Molly O"
- 1606. "Nelly was a Milkmaid"
- 1607. "Nothing At All"
- 1608. "Serious Tom"
- 1609. No record
- 1610. "The Tailor's Breeches"
- 1611. "Young Susan Had Lovers"
- 1612. "Sweet Swansea"
- 1613. "The Trooper Watering His Nag"
- 1614. "I'll Go and Enlist for a Sailor"
- 1615. "The Christmas Suckling Pig", "The Sussex Pig"
- 1616. "There's Bound to Be a Row"
- 1617. "Will Watch"
- 1618. "Young Henry of the Raging Main"
- 1619. "Green Linnet"
- 1620. "Giles Scroggins' Ghost"
- 1621. "Robin Hood and the Curtal Friar" (Child 123)
- 1622. No record
- 1623. "Buy Broom Besoms"
- 1624. "The Crafty Maid"
- 1625. "Kelly the Pirate"
- 1626. "(My Name's) Napoleon Bonaparte", "Napoleon's Farewell to Paris"
- 1627. "Duncan Campbell"
- 1628. "The Squire and the Gipsey Girl"
- 1629. "The Poor Irish Stranger"
- 1630. "Stark Naked Robbery"
- 1631. "The Bedmaking"
- 1632. "The Old Miser", "Better for Maids to Live Single"
- 1633. "Bonny Kate"
- 1634. "Hark Away", "Bright Phoebus"
- 1635. "Buttercup Joe"
- 1636. No record
- 1637. No record
- 1638. "The Sailor's Frolic"
- 1639. "The Gay Ploughboy"
- 1640. "Quite Politely"
- 1641. "John White"
- 1642. "Down in Yon Meadows"
- 1643. "Fare Thee Well Cold Winter", "Long Looked for Come at Last"
- 1644. "Low Down in the Broom"
- 1645. "The Leaboy's Lassie"
- 1646. "Beautiful Nancy"
- 1647. "I'm a Damsel so Blooming and Gay", "Oh How I Long to Get Married"
- 1648. "Old Woman's Song"
- 1649. "The Roving Bachelor", "As Came Ower Yon High High Hill"
- 1650. "Seven Months I've Been Married"
- 1651. "Beautiful Damsel"
- 1652. "Three Jolly Sneaksmen"
- 1653. "Watercresses"
- 1654. "Avington Pond"
- 1655. "The Deserter"
- 1656. "Bonny Black Hare"
- 1657. "My Master's Gun"
- 1658. "The Cattistock Hunting Song", "Dream of Napoleon", "The Old Bitch Fox"
- 1659. "The Factory Girl"
- 1660. "Lord Paget"
- 1661. "The Drinker", "The Merry Tippler"
- 1662. No record
- 1663. "The Pensioner's Complaint"
- 1664. "Poor Jolly Sailor Lads", "Come All You Pretty Fair Maids"
- 1665. "Portsmouth City"
- 1666. "Roger and Nell", "Old Berkshire Song"
- 1667. "The Brisk Lad", "The Sheepstealer"
- 1668. "Three Oxford Scholars"
- 1669. "Time to Be Made a Wife"
- 1670. No record
- 1671. "The Apprentice Sailor"
- 1672. "Billy and Sally"
- 1673. No record
- 1674. "Captain Avery", "The Linnet"
- 1675. "The Brisk Young Sailor Bold"
- 1676. "Colin and His Cow"
- 1677. "Come Come My Friends"
- 1678. "The Drum Major"
- 1679. "Tailor in a Hobble"
- 1680. "I Never Says Nothing to Nobody"
- 1681. "Joe the Marine"
- 1682. "Johnny and Molly"
- 1683. "The Lovely Milkmaid"
- 1684. "The Maid's Lament"
- 1685. "The Newfoundland Sailor"
- 1686. "The Bold Poachers", "The Oakham Poachers"
- 1687. "Paddy Backwards"
- 1688. "The Ploughboy and the Cockney"
- 1689. No record
- 1690. "Poacher's Song", "Three Hearty Young Poachers"
- 1691. "The Wandering Girl"
- 1692. "Week's Matrimony"
- 1693. "When My Old Hat Was New"
- 1694. "An Old Woman Clothed in Grey"
- 1695. "Captain Coulston"
- 1696. "The Devil and Little Mike"
- 1697. "The Holy Well"
- 1698. "Rakes of Kildare"
- 1699. "Gallant Female Sailor"
- 1700. "The Bloody Gardener"

=== 1701 to 1800 ===
- 1701. "James and Flora"
- 1702. "Constant Johnny"
- 1703. "Adieu to Old England", "Once I Had a Featherbed"
- 1704. "Matthew Mark Luke and John", "My Coffin Shall Be Black"
- 1705. "In Bodmin Town"
- 1706. "Speculation", "The Lofty Giant"
- 1707. "The Plowboys' Song"
- 1708. "I Wish There Was No Prison"
- 1709. "The Irish Hop-Pole Puller"
- 1710. "Three Jolly Boys"
- 1711. "Adventures of Little Mike"
- 1712. "Down By the Seaside"
- 1713. "The Pear Tree"
- 1714. "Come All You Young Lovers", "The Rich Lady Gay"
- 1715. "Hopping Down in Kent"
- 1716. "The Colour of Amber"
- 1717. "A Woman's Work is Never Done"
- 1718. "Llandaff"
- 1719. "It's of a Young Soldier"
- 1720. "Young Collins"
- 1721. "Abroad as I was Walking"
- 1722. "Six Joyful Welchmen"
- 1723. "Pretty Betsy of Deptford"
- 1724. "Our General Bold Captain"
- 1725. "No record"
- 1726. "A Warning To Deserters", "Stinton the Deserter"
- 1727. "The Cobbler and the Miser"
- 1728. "Banks of the Clyde"
- 1729. "Hartlake Bridge"
- 1730. "Awa' Birds Away", "Bird Tenting Song", "Car-Whoo Car-Whoo"
- 1731. "A Man that is Stout and Bold"
- 1732. "Atching Tan Song"
- 1733. "The Broomdasher"
- 1734. "The Freckless Young Girl", "Taking an Evening's Walk"
- 1735. "The Gloucester Blinder", "Muddley Barracks"
- 1736. "Down in the Fields Where the Buttercups All Grow"
- 1737. "Little Pigs", "The Old Sow"
- 1738. "Jolly Jarge"
- 1739. "The Dockyard Gate"
- 1740. "Good Old Jeff"
- 1741. "Why Can't it Always Be Saturday"
- 1742. "Seaweed"
- 1743. "Cottage By the Sea"
- 1744. "Farmer Giles"
- 1745. "Reason Why"
- 1746. "The Hungry Army"
- 1747. "Cod Banging"
- 1748. "No record"
- 1749. "Miner's Dream of Home"
- 1750. "No record"
- 1751. "The Dear Little Maiden"
- 1752. "A Country Life"
- 1753. "White Wings"
- 1754. "Handy Man"
- 1755. "Little Sweetheart In the Spring"
- 1756. "A Boy's Best Friend is His Mother"
- 1757. "Maggie May"
- 1758. "Among My Souvenirs"
- 1759. "Rufford Park Poachers"
- 1760. "John Bowlin'"
- 1761. "Landlord and Tenant"
- 1762. "Owd Yowe Wi' One Horn, T'"
- 1763. "Song of the Thrush"
- 1764. "Gypsy's Warning"
- 1765. "No record"
- 1766. "No record"
- 1767. "Polly's Father Lived in Lincolnshire"
- 1768. "Rolling on the Grass"
- 1769. "Merry Mountain Child"
- 1770. "The Powder Monkey"
- 1771. "The Muffin Man"
- 1772. "Farmer's Dog"
- 1773. "No record"
- 1774. "Hold the Fort"
- 1775. "Come Little Leaves"
- 1776. "Jemima Brown"
- 1777. "Oh Joe the Boat's Going Over"
- 1778. "Ten Thousand Miles Away"
- 1779. "What Will Become of England?"
- 1780. "Firelock Stile"
- 1781. "Barton Broad Babbing Ballad"
- 1782. "Marshfield Mummers Song", "St. Stephen's Day"
- 1783. "Two Sweethearts", "A Group of Young Squaddies"
- 1784. "Banks of the Clyde", "The Lad in the Scotch Brigade"
- 1785. "Jolly Jack the Sailor Lad"
- 1786. "Rap Her to Bank"
- 1787. "The Loss of the London"
- 1788. "The Smacksman"
- 1789. "Now is the Time for Fishing"
- 1790. "Robin Hood's Progress to Nottingham" (Child 139)
- 1791. "Annie"
- 1792. "Jocky Said to Jenny"
- 1793. "Jack the Sailor"
- 1794. "Jack Robinson"
- 1795. "I Waited Out My Hours", "I've Rambled This Country Both Early and Late"
- 1796. "Rose of Britain's Isle"
- 1797. "When I Was a Young Man"
- 1798. "Chanty Song (So It's Pass...)"
- 1799. "Soon We'll Be in England Town"
- 1800. "Bold McCarthy"

=== 1801 to 1900 ===
- 1801. "The Emigrant's Farewell", "Bellingham", "Good Friends and Companions"
- 1802. "The Flying Cloud"
- 1803. "England's Great Loss By a Storm of Wind" (Laws K2)
- 1804. "The Drummer Boy of Waterloo" (Laws J1)
- 1805. "Erin Far Away" (Laws J6)
- 1806. "Casey's Whiskey" (Laws dH51)
- 1807. "Jessie Munro" (Laws P40)
- 1808. "The Jug of Punch"
- 1809. "American Woods" (Laws M36)
- 1810. "As Now We Are Sailing"
- 1811. "Citadel Hill"
- 1812. "The Banks of Newfoundland" (Laws K25)
- 1813. No record
- 1814. "Brigantine Sirocco"
- 1815. "Canso Strait" (Laws dD52)
- 1816. "Captain Conrod" (Laws dD51)
- 1817. "George Jones" (Laws D20)
- 1818. "Saladin's Crew" (Laws dD45)
- 1819. No record
- 1820. "Dutchman's Song"
- 1821. "The Flemings from Torbay" (Laws D23)
- 1822. "The Ghostly Sailors" (Laws D16)
- 1823. "Burning of the Granite Mill" (Laws G13)
- 1824. "Guysboro Song" (Laws dD48)
- 1825. "Moosehead Lake"
- 1826. "Joe Livermore"
- 1827. "Jolly Fisherman" (Laws dD47)
- 1828. "Lukey's Boat", "Loakie's Boat"
- 1829. "Loss of the Philosophy" (Laws dD49)
- 1830. "Louisiana Lowlands"
- 1831. "The Mary L. McKay" (Laws dD50)
- 1832. "McCarthy's Song" (Laws dH52)
- 1833. "McNab's Island"
- 1834. "Meagher's Children" (Laws G25)
- 1835. "Ocean Queen"
- 1836. "The Lakes of Pontchartrain" (Laws H9)
- 1837. "Young Millman", "Prince Edward Island Murder" (Laws dF59)
- 1838. "Sable Island Song"
- 1839. "Sable Island Song" (accidental repeat)
- 1840. "The Seizure of the E.A. Horton" (Laws D28)
- 1841. "Song of the Tangier Gold Mines"
- 1842. No record
- 1843. "Twas In the Town of Parsboro" (Laws dH44)
- 1844. "Unicorn" (Laws dD46)
- 1845. "Tacking a Full Rigged Ship Off Shore"
- 1846. "The Indian's Lament"
- 1847. "Out With My Gun in the Morning", "The Contented Countryman"
- 1848. "The Fella Who Played the Trombone"
- 1849. "The Parson's Creed"
- 1850. "The Chinaman With the Monkey Nose"
- 1851. "Stormy Weather Boys"
- 1852. "The Candlelight Fisherman"
- 1853. "The Oily Rig"
- 1854. "The Fish and Chip Ship", "While Going Around the Cape", "I Am an Ancient Mariner"
- 1855. "The Collier Brig", "The Worst Old Ship"
- 1856. No record
- 1857. "Old Johnny Braddlem"
- 1858. "Joe Bowman"
- 1859. "The Horn Of The Hunter"
- 1860. "The Ullswater Pack", "Pass the Jug Around"
- 1861. "The Hunting Priest", "Tally Ho the Hounds", "Doctor Mack"
- 1862. "Drink Puppy Drink"
- 1863. "The Birds Upon the Tree"
- 1864. "The Welton Hunt"
- 1865. "The Lish Young Buy-a-broom"
- 1866. "My Uncle Pete"
- 1867. "Corby Castle"
- 1868. "Reynard the Fox"
- 1869. "Wharncliffe Highwood", "Rural Sport"
- 1870. No record
- 1871. "On A Fine Hunting Morn"
- 1872. "Maids of Australia"
- 1873. "The Scent Was Good"
- 1874. "Tramps and Hawkers"
- 1875. "Nicky Tams"
- 1876. "The Moss O' Burreldale"
- 1877. "The Fattest Man in the Forty-Twa"
- 1878. "Jimmy Macelbee"
- 1879. "Jimmy Run Down to Your Uncle"
- 1880. "The Ring Dang Doo"
- 1881. "The Game of Football"
- 1882. "Bobbin Winder's Song"
- 1883. "The Dodgey Putter"
- 1884. "Morrissey and the Black" (Laws H19)
- 1885. "The Chapeau Boys"
- 1886. "Lady of the Lake"
- 1887. "The Half-Hitch", "The Old Shoe" (Laws N23)
- 1888. "The Blaeberries" (Laws N19)
- 1889. "The Lady Leroy" (Laws N5)
- 1890. "When the Battle it Was Won" (Laws J23)
- 1891. "The Chesapeake and Shannon" (Laws J21)
- 1892. "Nelson's Victory" (Laws J48)
- 1893. "Burke's Dream" (Laws J16)
- 1894. "The Blind Sailor", "Cork Harbour" (Laws K6)
- 1895. No record
- 1896. "Susan Strayed the Briny Beach" (Laws K19)
- 1897. "The Flying Dutchman" (Laws K23)
- 1898. "The Merman", "The Maid With a Tail" (Laws K24)
- 1899. "Bold Daniel" (Laws K34)
- 1900. "Captain Kidd" (Laws K35)

=== 1901 to 2000 ===
- 1901. "My Ducksie Has Fled", "Gold Watch" (Laws K41)
- 1902. "Ye Landsmen and Ye Seamen Bold", "Sailor's Hornpipe" (Laws K42)
- 1903. "Jack Sheppard" (Laws L6)
- 1904. "My Bonny Black Bess" (Laws L8)
- 1905. "Transported for Mail Robbery", "A Prisoner For Life" (Laws L15)
- 1906. "Jack Williams" (Laws L17)
- 1907. "I Am a Wild Young Irish Boy" (Laws L19)
- 1908. No record
- 1909. "Duffy's Farewell" (Laws M5)
- 1910. "Forty Years Ago"
- 1911. "Pretty Betsey", "It's of a Young Damsel in Crewkerne Did Dwell", "The Young Scotchman of Dover" (Laws M18)
- 1912. No record
- 1913. "Lovely Willie" (Laws M35)
- 1914. "Sir Niel and MacVan", "Glengyle" (Laws M39)
- 1915. "On the First of November", "Bold Alexander" (Laws N1)
- 1916. "Wild Americay" (Laws O19)
- 1917. "The Soldier Boy" (Laws O31)
- 1918. "Courting Too Slow" (Laws P5)
- 1919. "Pat O'Brien" (Laws P39)
- 1920. "The Romish Lady" (Laws Q32)
- 1921. "Waterloo" (Laws J2)
- 1922. "The Plains O' Waterloo" (Laws J3)
- 1923. "The Battle of Waterloo" (Laws J3)
- 1924. "As I Roved Out Through Irishtown", "The Crimean War" (Laws J9)
- 1925. "The Banks of Gaspeareaux" (Laws C26)
- 1926. "Turner's Camp" (Laws C23)
- 1927. "The Dam on Baldwin Creek" (Laws C21)
- 1928. "Driving Logs on the Cass" (Laws C22)
- 1929. "Utah Carroll" (Laws B4)
- 1930. "Little Joe the Wrangler" (Laws B5)
- 1931. "Perished in the Snow" (Laws G32)
- 1932. "Murdered By A Brother" (Laws F12)
- 1933. "Lula Vares" (Laws F10)
- 1934. "Revolutionary Tea" (Laws A24)
- 1935. "The Murder of Laura Foster" (Laws F36)
- 1936. No record
- 1937. "The Dying Hobo" (Laws H3)
- 1938. "The Chippewa Stream" (Laws H10)
- 1939. "Stratton Mountain Tragedy" (Laws G18)
- 1940. "Floyd Collins" (Laws G22)
- 1941. "Jamie Foyers"
- 1942. "The Winter of Seventy-Three"
- 1943. "Napoleon Bonaparte"
- 1944. "Rocky Brook", "Samuel Allen" (Laws C10)
- 1945. "The Camp on McNeil"
- 1946. "The Napan Heroes"
- 1947. "The Ploughboy"
- 1948. "Joe Brook"
- 1949. "Arthur Curtis's Horse"
- 1950. "The Merner Song"
- 1951. "If You'll Only Let Whiskey Alone"
- 1952. "Anything"
- 1953. No record
- 1954. "The Months of the Year"
- 1955. "Good Old State of Maine"
- 1956. No record
- 1957. "Sarah's Young Man"
- 1958. "Pulling Hard Against the Stream"
- 1959. "The Cedar Grove" (Laws D18)
- 1960. "The Irish Patriot"
- 1961. "Duffy's Hotel"
- 1962. "The Demon of the Sea"
- 1963. "The Plain Golden Band" (Laws H17)
- 1964. "The Belles of Renous"
- 1965. "The Glen Alone"
- 1966. "The Unknown Log Rider"
- 1967. "The Last Letter"
- 1968. "Guy Reed" (Laws C6)
- 1969. "McLellan's Son" (Laws dG43)
- 1970. "The Banks of Brandywine" (Laws H28)
- 1971. No record
- 1972. "Banks of Newfoundland"
- 1973. "The Shooting Star"
- 1974. "The Wreck of the Lady Sherbrooke"
- 1975. No record
- 1976. "The Bounty Jumper"
- 1977. "Our Fifer Boy"
- 1978. "Rose of Tralee"
- 1979. "The Burial of Sir John Moore"
- 1980. "A Hundred Years Ago"
- 1981. "Live and Let Live"
- 1982. "The Moon is Up"
- 1983. "Jack's Come Home Today"
- 1984. "Tom Bowling"
- 1985. "Humphrey Hough"
- 1986. "Two Orphan Boys"
- 1987. "We Britons to Arms"
- 1988. "Blann's Beer"
- 1989. "Bright Phoebe"
- 1990. "Behind the Green Bush"
- 1991. "County Tyrone", "Jane of Tyrone"
- 1992. "Bonaparte"
- 1993. "I Had a Handsome Fortune"
- 1994. "Logie O'Buchan"
- 1995. "A New Song"
- 1996. "The First Time I Saw My Love", "The Generous Lover"
- 1997. "The Coast of Peru" (Laws D26)
- 1998. "A Fitting Out"
- 1999. "The Cruise of the Dove"
- 2000. "The Bitter Whaling Ground"

=== 2001 to 2100 ===
- 2001. "The Whalers' Song"
- 2002. "A Whaling Scene"
- 2003. "Our Old Friend Coffin"
- 2004. "The Wounded Whale"
- 2005. "Rolling Down to Old Maui"
- 2006. "Diego's Bold Shore"
- 2007. "The Old Hulk"
- 2008. "The Bark Gay Head"
- 2009. "The Bark Ocean Rover"
- 2010. "Desolation"
- 2011. "The Wings of a Goney"
- 2012. "Blow Ye Winds"
- 2013. No record
- 2014. "A Wet Sheet and a Flowing Sea"
- 2015. "Sling the Flowing Bowl"
- 2016. "Come Loose Every Sail to the Breeze"
- 2017. "The Topsail Shivers in the Wind"
- 2018. "Will Watch (Sequel To)"
- 2019. "The Sea"
- 2020. "Saturday Night at Sea"
- 2021. "I Was Once a Sailor"
- 2022. "Sailors' Come All Ye", "Heart of Gold"
- 2023. "The Can of Grog"
- 2024. "Pirate of the Isles"
- 2025. "The Cornish Pirate"
- 2026. "Most Beautiful"
- 2027. "The Sea Ran High"
- 2028. "The Ocean Queen"
- 2029. "The Storm Was Loud"
- 2030. "Neptune", "The Ocean King"
- 2031. "The Dauntless Sailor"
- 2032. "The Sovereign of the Sea"
- 2033. "A Life on the Ocean Wave"
- 2034. "A Young Virgin"
- 2035. "The Surpriz'd Nymph", "The Swimming Lady", "A Wanton Discovery"
- 2036. "I Would that the Wars Were All Over"
- 2037. "Paddy Stole the Rope"
- 2038. "William Rufus"
- 2039. "Women Love Kissing as Well as the Men"
- 2040. "The Times"
- 2041. "The Heathen Dear", "My Name is Santa Claus"
- 2042. "The Moon is Brightly Beaming Love"
- 2043. "Shearing Day"
- 2044. "Sarah Maria Cornell"
- 2045. "The Banks of Schuykill"
- 2046. "The Banks of Champlain"
- 2047. "A New Liberty Song"
- 2048. "A Song on the Nantucket Ladies", "Round Cape Horn"
- 2049. "Blessed Land of Love and Liberty"
- 2050. "Sons of Worth"
- 2051. "John Bull's Epistle"
- 2052. "Ho for California"
- 2053. "The Captain"
- 2054. "The Confession"
- 2055. "The Indian Hunter"
- 2056. "Willie Gray"
- 2057. "Willie's on the Dark Blue Sea"
- 2058. "Banks of Banna", "Anna"
- 2059. "The Maid of Erin"
- 2060. "Adieu My Native Land"
- 2061. "The Angel's Whisper"
- 2062. "The Bride's Farewell"
- 2063. "The Dying Soldier"
- 2064. "The Ocean"
- 2065. "Thou Hast Learned to Love Another"
- 2066. "We Met"
- 2067. "Jamie's on the Stormy Sea"
- 2068. "Adieu to Erin"
- 2069. "Blow High Blow Low"
- 2070. "The Beacon Light"
- 2071. "Virtuous America"
- 2072. "A New Sea Song"
- 2073. "Hunter's Lane"
- 2074. "Fare You Well"
- 2075. "A Scots Sang", "I Lost my Love and I Carena"
- 2076. "When I Remember"
- 2077. "Come Let Us Be Jolly"
- 2078. "Ye Parliament of England"
- 2079. "An Ancient Riddle"
- 2080. "Wait for the Wagon"
- 2081. "Prayer"
- 2082. "The Pilot"
- 2083. "The Lord Our God"
- 2084. "Row On"
- 2085. "The Recruiting Sargent"
- 2086. "The Post Below"
- 2087. "A Love Song in the Year 1769"
- 2088. "Elegy on the Death of a Mad Dog"
- 2089. "A Charming Fellow"
- 2090. "The Wreath"
- 2091. "I Cannot Call Her Mother"
- 2092. "Village Born Beauty"
- 2093. "As I Grow Old"
- 2094. "Barney McCoy"
- 2095. "Thomas Farewell", "The Sailor's Farewell"
- 2096. "Terrible Polly"
- 2097. "The Wide World of Waters"
- 2098. No record
- 2099. "The Keyhole in the Door"
- 2100. "The Sandshark"

=== 2101 to 2200 ===
- 2101. "Billy O'Roorke"
- 2102. "Witty Shepherd"
- 2103. "Jordan"
- 2104. "Cupid's Charms"
- 2105. "Did You See My Lad", "Bonny Bonny Lad"
- 2106. "A Tar's Song", "The Sailor's Meeting"
- 2107. "Sary Syke"
- 2108. "Sally is the Girl for Me"
- 2109. "The Truth Sent from Above"
- 2110. "The Man that Lives Must Learn to Die", "On Life and Death"
- 2111. "Awake Awake Sweet England"
- 2112. "Christ Made a Trance", "The Moon Shines Bright"
- 2113. "Twelve Apostles", "When Jesus Christ Had Lived"
- 2114. "The Birth of the Saviour"
- 2115. "A Most Excellent Ballad of Joseph the Carpenter", "Marye and Joseph"
- 2116. "Savior's Love"
- 2117. "The Iron Peel"
- 2118. "Poor Jenny Sits-a-Weeping"
- 2119. "Christ is Born of a Maiden Fair"
- 2120. "The Little Room"
- 2121. "Green Grow the Leaves"
- 2122. "Easter Snow"
- 2123. "Greenwood Laddie"
- 2124. "The Mountain Streams", "Wi' My Dog and Gun"
- 2125. "Yon Green Valley"
- 2126. "The Long Peg and Awl"
- 2127. "The Magpie's Nest"
- 2128. "She Was a Rum One"
- 2129. "Baldheaded End of the Broom", "Love", "Boys Take Care"
- 2130. "The Deserted Husband"
- 2131. "The One Thing or the Other"
- 2132. "The Joyful Widower"
- 2133. "The Doffin Mistress"
- 2134. "Hot Ashfelt"
- 2135. "Father's Old Coat", "Pee Wee Jockie Clark"
- 2136. "The Barnyards of Delgaty"
- 2137. "Mucking O' Geordie's Byre"
- 2138. "The Roving Ploughboy"
- 2139. "Tommy Suet's Ball"
- 2140. "The Ewie wi' the Crooked Horn"
- 2141. "Hey John Barleycorn"
- 2142. "The Day We Went to Rothesay-o"
- 2143. "On Ilkla Moor Baht 'at"
- 2144. "Did You Ever See"
- 2145. "The Wild Man of Borneo"
- 2146. "The Black Velvet Band"
- 2147. "Donnelly and Cooper"
- 2148. "Heenan and Sayers"
- 2149. "The Knickerbocker Line"
- 2150. "Morrissey and the Russian"
- 2151. "The Standing Stones"
- 2152. "Sweet Fanny Adams"
- 2153. "The Beggar Wench"
- 2154. "The Berryfields of Blair"
- 2155. "Bogie's Bonnie Belle"
- 2156. "Casro Manishi-o"
- 2157. "Big Jimmy Drummond", "The Choring Song"
- 2158. "Hush Little Babbie"
- 2159. "I Binged Avree"
- 2160. "McPherson's Farewell" (Robert Burns)
- 2161. "Me Brother's 'Orse"
- 2162. "That Tattie Liftin'"
- 2163. "The Traveling Candyman"
- 2164. "Johnnie Sangster"
- 2165. "Lothian Hairst"
- 2166. "Ellon Fair"
- 2167. "The Hairst"
- 2168. "Irish Molly O"
- 2169. "Rosie Anderson"
- 2170. "The Bonny Lad that Handles the Plough"
- 2171. "Mormond Braes"
- 2172. "The Bonnie Ship the Diamond"
- 2173. "It Fell About a Martinmas Time"
- 2174. "The Rocks of Gibraltar"
- 2175. "Broomhill's Bonny Dochter"
- 2176. "The Barns of Beneuchies"
- 2177. "A Shillin or Twa"
- 2178. "A Shillin or Twa"
- 2179. "Ellen of Aberdeen"
- 2180. "Drumdelgie"
- 2181. "The Weary Farmers"
- 2182. "The Battle of Barrossa"
- 2183. "The Highland Maid"
- 2184. "The Day of Waterloo"
- 2185. "Enniskillen Dragoon"
- 2186. "Welcome Table"
- 2187. "Fellow that Looks Like Me" (Laws H21)
- 2188. "The Warrantee Deed" (Laws H24)
- 2189. "The Girl With the Waterfall" (Laws H26)
- 2190. "Ten Broeck and Mollie" (Laws H26)
- 2191. "The Blooming Bright Star of Belle Isle" (Laws H29)
- 2192. "Jerry Go Oil That Car" (Laws H30)
- 2193. "Christine Leroy" (Laws H31)
- 2194. "Tittery Nan" (Laws H16)
- 2195. "The Dunville Girl" (Laws H14)
- 2196. "On the Banks of the Pembina" (Laws H11)
- 2197. "The Hard-Working Miner" (Laws G33)
- 2198. "The Chatsworth Wreck" (Laws G30)
- 2199. "The Battle of Shiloh" (Laws A10)
- 2200. "The Battle on Shiloh's Hill" (Laws A11)

=== 2201 to 2300 ===
- 2201. "The Pea Ridge Battle" (Laws A12)
- 2202. "Manassa Junction", "Battle of Bull Run" (Laws A9)
- 2203. No record
- 2204. "James Bird" (Laws A5)
- 2205. "James Bird's Farewell" (Laws A5)
- 2206. "A Soldier from Missouri", "Along the Kansas Line" (Laws A16)
- 2207. "War Song" (Laws A19)
- 2208. "Hiram Hubbard" (Laws A20)
- 2209. "Bold Dighton" (Laws A21)
- 2210. "Come All You Bold Canadians" (Laws A22)
- 2211. "The Hunters of Kentucky" (Laws A25)
- 2212. "Pearl Bryan" (Laws F2)
- 2213. "The Fort Thomas Murder" (Laws F3)
- 2214. No record
- 2215. "Jim Fisk" (Laws F18)
- 2216. "The Vance Song" (Laws F17)
- 2217. "Harry Bale" (Laws C13)
- 2218. "The Death of Harry Bradford" (Laws C12)
- 2219. "Shantyboy on the Big Eau Plaine" (Laws C11)
- 2220. "Lost Jimmie Whalen" (Laws C8)
- 2221. "Tebo" (Laws C6)
- 2222. "John Roberts" (Laws C3)
- 2223. "John Singleton" (Laws C15)
- 2224. "Sam Bass", "The Little Brown Bulls" (Laws C16)
- 2225. "The Three McFarlands" (Laws C18)
- 2226. "Blue Mountain Lake" (Laws C20)
- 2227. "Bold Northwestman" (Laws D1)
- 2228. "The Loss of the Albion" (Laws D2)
- 2229. "Fifteen Ships on George's Banks" (Laws D3)
- 2230. "The Persian's Crew" (Laws D4)
- 2231. "The Death of William Dilley" (Laws D5)
- 2232. "The Death of Herbert Rice" (Laws D6)
- 2233. "Red Iron Ore" (Laws D9)
- 2234. "The Dream of the Miner's Child" (Laws D10)
- 2235. "The Eastern Light" (Laws D11)
- 2236. "The Dom Pedro" (Laws D12)
- 2237. "The Maids of Simcoe", "The Schooner Fred Dunbar" (Laws D14)
- 2238. "The Beaver Island Boys" (Laws D17)
- 2239. "The Wreck of the Huron" (Laws D21)
- 2240. "Jesse James"
- 2241. "Jesse James" (Laws E2)
- 2242. "A Missouri Ballad" (Laws dE44)
- 2243. "Cole Younger"
- 2244. "Sam Bass" (Laws E4)
- 2245. "Claud Allen"
- 2246. "Wild Bill Jones" (Laws E10)
- 2247. "Wilkes Lovell" (Laws E9)
- 2248. "Twenty-One Years" (Laws E16)
- 2249. "Zen Turner's Gal" (Laws E18)
- 2250. "Harvey Logan" (Laws E21)
- 2251. "Mary's Complaint"
- 2252. No record
- 2253. "Frank Dupree" (Laws E24)
- 2254. "Muff Lawler the Squealer" (Laws E25)
- 2255. "J.R. Birchall" (Laws E26)
- 2256. "The Murder of Grace Brown" (Laws F7)
- 2257. "The Brookfield Murder" (Laws F8)
- 2258. "Munro's Confession", "The Murder of Sarah Vail" (Laws F9)
- 2259. "Josie Langmaid" (Laws F21)
- 2260. "Poor Goins" (Laws F22)
- 2261. "John Funston" (Laws F23)
- 2262. "The Peddler and His Wife" (Laws F24)
- 2263. "The Ashland Tragedy" (Laws F25)
- 2264. "The Birchall Murder" (Laws F26)
- 2265. No record
- 2266. "The Meeks Murder" (Laws F28)
- 2267. "The Midnight Murder of the Meeks Family" (Laws F29)
- 2268. "Little Nellie Meeks" (Laws F30)
- 2269. "The Meeks Family" (Laws dF49)
- 2270. "Nellie's Lament" (Laws dF50)
- 2271. "Bejamin Deane" (Laws F32)
- 2272. "Death of Emma Hartzell" (Laws F34)
- 2273. "Stella Kenny" (Laws F37)
- 2274. "Sir James the Rose" (Child 213)
- 2275. "Early Monday Morning"
- 2276. "A Bonny Ca' Laddie For Me"
- 2277. No record
- 2278. "On Board the Victory"
- 2279. "Richard and I"
- 2280. "Peggy Gordon"
- 2281. "Crookit Bawbee"
- 2282. "Sweet Letty Lee"
- 2283. "The Dying Californian"
- 2284. "Henry and Mary Ann"
- 2285. "What Harm Has Jesus Done"
- 2286. "Climbing Jacob's Ladder"
- 2287. "The Shamrock Shore"
- 2288. "Free And Easy to Jog Along"
- 2289. "The Good Ship Cambria"
- 2290. "The Green Fields of Canada"
- 2291. "Finvola the Gem of the Roe"
- 2292. "The Faughan Shore"
- 2293. "There Waur a Farmer's Dochter"
- 2294. "Down By the Canal"
- 2295. "The Wilderness Lady"
- 2296. "The Spanish Main"
- 2297. No record
- 2298. "The Cruel Father and Constant Lover"
- 2299. "Young M'Tyre"
- 2300. "The Road to Dundee"

=== 2301 to 2400 ===
- 2301. "Diana and Her Sailor Bright"
- 2302. "O Hard Fortune", "The Little Drummer"
- 2303. "The Discharged Drummer"
- 2305. "The Maiden's Lament"
- 2306. "She's Like the Swallow"
- 2307. "The Morning Dew"
- 2308. No record
- 2309. "Cruiskeen Lawn"
- 2310. "Three Jolly Jack Tars", "The Black Cook", "The Docter Outwitted By the Black"
- 2311. "The Weaver"
- 2312. "Skibbereen"
- 2313. "Daniel O'Connell"
- 2314. "By the Hush Me Boys"
- 2315. "Johnny Cope"
- 2316. "Young Munro"
- 2317. "Farewell to Funery"
- 2318. "The Jolly Raftsman O"
- 2319. "The Spree", "The Jolly Irishman"
- 2320. "The Twelfth of July"
- 2321. "Drink Round Brave Boys", "The Faggot Cutter"
- 2322. "Borland's Groves"
- 2323. "Sir Charles Lapier"
- 2324. "The Soo St. Mary's Jail" (Laws dE51)
- 2325. "Save Your Money When You're Young"
- 2326. "The Indian Lass"
- 2327. "Taking Gear in the Night"
- 2328. "Goodbye Susan Jane"
- 2329. "Groyle Machree"
- 2330. "Bonny Laddie Highland Laddie"
- 2331. "Jock Hawk"
- 2332. "The Ledbury Clergyman"
- 2333. "Inside a Whitewashed Hospital"
- 2334. "The Dream of a Miner's Child"
- 2335. "The Maid and the Palmer", "The Well Below the Valley" (Child 21)
- 2336. "Mistletoe Bough"
- 2337. "Lambton Worm" (See also Roud 3504)
- 2338. "Robin Hood and the Bishop of Hereford" (Child 144)
- 2339. "Heather Johnny"
- 2340. "A Woman's Work is Never Done"
- 2341. "In Rockley Firs"
- 2342. "Private Still"
- 2343. "The Gauger"
- 2344. "Oh Love it is a Killing Thing"
- 2345. "Nancy Pride of the East"
- 2346. "The Quarry Bank Mashers"
- 2347. "Mrs. Dyer the Baby Farmer"
- 2348. "The Priest and the Rake"
- 2349. "Reynard the Fox"
- 2350. "The Summer Comes and the Grass is Green"
- 2351. "Captain Bold Freney"
- 2352. "The First Time I Came to the County Limerick"
- 2353. "True Lovers' Departure"
- 2354. "I Wish I Had the Shepherd's Lamb", "Molly From Her Father"
- 2355. "Arthur McBride"
- 2356. "Boolavogue"
- 2357. "Ye Sons of Old Ireland"
- 2358. No record
- 2359. "A Chushla Gal Mochree: Thou Fair Pulse of My Heart"
- 2360. "The English Courtship", "Drecharian O'Machree"
- 2361. "North Country Maid"
- 2362. "The Boys of Mullabaun"
- 2363. "Drinane Dhu"
- 2364. "Castle Hyde"
- 2365. "Charming Colleen Ruadh"
- 2366. "The Cottage Maid"
- 2367. No record
- 2368. "Each Night When I Slumber"
- 2369. "My Mind it is Uneasy"
- 2370. "Handsome Sally"
- 2371. "Sweet Cootehill Town"
- 2372. "Oh Come With Me My Irish Girl"
- 2373. "Captain Thompson"
- 2374. "Bishop Butler of Kilcash"
- 2375. "Royal Blackbird"
- 2376. "Billy Byrne of Ballymanus"
- 2377. "McKenna's Dream"
- 2378. "The Pound of Tow"
- 2379. "Felix"
- 2380. "The Blackbird and the Thrush"
- 2381. "The Scolding Wife"
- 2382. "Finikin Lasses"
- 2383. No record
- 2384. No record
- 2385. "Moreen O'Kelly"
- 2386. "My Mama Did Kill Me"
- 2387. "Dainty Davie"
- 2388. "Dainty Davie Was a Lad"
- 2389. "'Twas in the End of King James's Street"
- 2390. "Long Time I've Courted You Miss"
- 2391. "The Pearl of Th' Irish Nation", "If Any of Those Children of Hunger Shall Cry"
- 2392. "Ye Natives of this Nation"
- 2393. "Cork and Sweet Munster"
- 2394. "The Orangeman"
- 2395. "The Lamentation of Hugh Reynolds"
- 2396. "She's the Dear Maid to Me"
- 2397. No record
- 2398. "Father Stole the Parson's Sheep", "The Lovely Irish Boy"
- 2399. "You Bachelors You Know"
- 2400. "Kitty Will You Marry Me"

=== 2401 to 2500 ===
- 2401. "Spla-Foot Nance"
- 2402. "The Real Irish Toper"
- 2403. "Tyne of Harrow"
- 2404. "Quare Bungle Rye"
- 2405. "Kelly's Lamentation", "My Parents and I Could Never Agree"
- 2406. "A Sweet Country Life"
- 2407. "O Once I Was a Shepherd Boy"
- 2408. "The Carter"
- 2409. "Twankydillo"
- 2410. "Sheep Stealer"
- 2411. "Bold Robinson", "The Two Champions"
- 2412. "Kitty Maggs and Jolter Giles"
- 2413. "My Meatless Day"
- 2414. "Good English Ale" (see also Roud 1512)
- 2415. "The Norton Fitzwarren Railway Disaster"
- 2416. "Peter the Miller"
- 2417. "A Jolly Farmer's Boy Be I"
- 2418. "I Wandered by the Brookside"
- 2419. "Deeds of Napoleon"
- 2420. No record
- 2421. "The Cobbler and the Goose"
- 2422. "Five Cripples"
- 2423. "As I Was Walking O'er Little Moorfields"
- 2424. No record
- 2425. "The Tooting Murder"
- 2426. "Money"
- 2427. "Ipswich Poaching Song"
- 2428. "The Holy Day"
- 2429. "The Black Decree"
- 2430. "Sons of Levi"
- 2431. "Sinner's Redemption"
- 2432. "Ratcliffe Highway"
- 2433. No record
- 2434. "The Yarmouth Fishermens' Song"
- 2435. No record
- 2436. "Lochnagar"
- 2437. "Acquittal of Thomas Haloran"
- 2438. "A Brisk Young Widow"
- 2439. "Dance To Your Daddy"
- 2440. No record
- 2441. "As I Was Going Over London Bridge", "Old Woman Lame and Blind"
- 2442. No record
- 2443. "Baskets and Chairs"
- 2444. "Young Lambs to Sell"
- 2445. "Arise and Pick a Posy"
- 2446. "Sing to Me Johnny"
- 2447. "Three Little Tailors"
- 2448. "'Twas in the Month of August"
- 2449. "The Hermit", "The Shepherd Tuned His Pipe"
- 2450. "Sweetly William"
- 2451. "Come Give Me a Slice of Your Bread"
- 2452. "The Sprig of May"
- 2453. "Navigation"
- 2454. No record
- 2455. "The Wearing of the Horns", "Horn Boys Horn"
- 2456. "Old Woman of Rumford", "Artichokes and Cauliflowers"
- 2457. "How Gallantly How Merrily", "The Shark"
- 2458. "Mary Thompson"
- 2459. "Molly Bawn"
- 2460. "Fourteen Days in Georgia"
- 2461. "Crows and Jackdaws"
- 2462. "The Baker of Colebrook"
- 2463. "He Was Under My Window"
- 2464. "The Margaret and the Mary"
- 2465. No record
- 2466. No record
- 2467. No record
- 2468. "The Maid with the Long Birches"
- 2469. "Sailor Song"
- 2470. "Harry's Courtship"
- 2471. "Harvest Song"
- 2472. "Harvest Feast Song"
- 2473. "Old Log Cabin Down the Lane"
- 2474. "The Poor Orphan Boy"
- 2475. "Johnny Smoker"
- 2476. "As I Was in the Fields One Day"
- 2477. No record
- 2478. "The Drunkard's Farewell to His Folly"
- 2479. "You Asked Me to Sing"
- 2480. "Be Kind to Nainsel' John"
- 2481. "Drumallachie"
- 2482. "Horn Fair"
- 2483. "Down in the Meadows"
- 2484. "All Glory to God"
- 2485. "Drumhullogan Bottoms"
- 2486. "The Maid of Magheracloone"
- 2487. No record
- 2488. "The Tyrone Tailor"
- 2489. "The Wonderful Musician"
- 2490. "The Kinlough Cow"
- 2491. "The Ella M. Rudolph"
- 2492. "James Magee"
- 2493. "The Maid of Culmore"
- 2494. "Mullinabrone"
- 2495. "The Banks of Kilrea"
- 2496. "The Highland Soldier"
- 2497. "Tammy Toddles"
- 2498. "The Parson's Fat Wedder", "Parson Brown's Sheep"
- 2499. "I Can't Get a Horse in the Country"
- 2500. "Aikey Brae"

=== 2501 to 2600 ===
- 2501. "The Rozzin Box"
- 2502. "William Scanlon"
- 2503. "The Ballymount Forest"
- 2504. "Donnybrook Fair"
- 2505. "The Lament of a Traveller Woman"
- 2506. "Big Jimmy Drummond"
- 2507. "Doctor Pritchard"
- 2508. "Gum Shellack"
- 2509. "Poor Old Man"
- 2510. "The Deserter from Kent"
- 2511. "Allan MacLean"
- 2512. "The Shady Green Tree"
- 2513. "My Love Lays Cold Beneath My Feet"
- 2514. "The Dying Ploughboy"
- 2515. "The Jolly Barber"
- 2516. "Feeing Time"
- 2517. "The Feein' Time"
- 2518. "McGinty's Meal and Ale"
- 2519. "Fine Featherin Oot"
- 2520. "Ten a Penny Walnuts"
- 2521. "Barbara Bell"
- 2522. "The Whorton Wedding"
- 2523. "Canny Cummerlan"
- 2524. "Gwordie Gill"
- 2525. "Jenny's Complaint"
- 2526. "Rob Lowrie"
- 2527. No record
- 2528. No record
- 2529. "The Royal George"
- 2530. "The Ranter Parson"
- 2531. "Hunting Song"
- 2532. "All Things Are Quite Silent"
- 2533. "The Nobleman"
- 2534. "Kissin' in the Dark"
- 2535. "Kiss Me in the Dark"
- 2536. "I Married a Wife"
- 2537. "Moreton Bay"
- 2538. "I Am A Pretty Wench"
- 2539. "The Eighteenth June", "The Famous Battle of Waterloo"
- 2540. "Fare Thee Well My Dearest Dear"
- 2541. "The Long Whip"
- 2542. "I Wouldn't Leave My Little Wooden Hut"
- 2543. "Sledburn Fair"
- 2544. "Valiant Monroe"
- 2545. "Yubberdon Mawms"
- 2546. "What Did Your Sailor Leave?"
- 2547. "Boney's Lamentation"
- 2548. No record
- 2549. "The Moon Shines Bright"
- 2550. "Mark Well My Words", "Mark Me Once More Then John"
- 2551. "'Ware Out Mother"
- 2552. "All The Little Chickens In The Garden"
- 2553. "Shades of Evening"
- 2554. "Highland Jane"
- 2555. "Three Pretty Maidens"
- 2556. "The Maid of Listole"
- 2557. No record
- 2558. "Pat Must Emigrate"
- 2559. "A New Song on Lucky Elopement"
- 2560. "Boughleen Down"
- 2561. "Kate of Arglyn"
- 2562. "Farewell to Tarwathie"
- 2563. "The Fancy Frigate", "La Pique"
- 2564. "Any Complaints"
- 2565. "Hand Me Down My Petticoat"
- 2566. No record
- 2567. "Ghost Army of Korea"
- 2568. "Seven Years in the Sand", "The Cocks is Crowing"
- 2569. "On the Move"
- 2570. "Ivor"
- 2571. "Aiken Drum" (Hogg 89)
- 2572. "Killicrankie"
- 2573. "The Wee Wee German Lairdie"
- 2574. "The Plaidy Awa'"
- 2575. "The Maid Gaed tae the Mill", "The Miller and Lass"
- 2576. "The Scoldin' Wife"
- 2577. "Supper Isna Ready"
- 2578. "Gala Water"
- 2579. "Kissin's No Sin"
- 2580. "Friendless Mary"
- 2581. "Jenny Nettles"
- 2582. "Lassie Wi' the Yellow Coatie"
- 2583. "Eppie Morrie" (Child 223)
- 2584. "Pitgair", "O Charlie O Charlie"
- 2585. "The Jute Mill Song"
- 2586. "Fourpence A Day"
- 2587. "Johnny Lad"
- 2588. No record
- 2589. "The Big Mansion House"
- 2590. "Wha's at the Window"
- 2591. "Nice Young Maidens"
- 2592. "John of Badenyon"
- 2593. "When I Was Single"
- 2594. "The Close of an Irish Day"
- 2595. "Jenny Dang the Weaver"
- 2596. "If I Had Gold in Gowpins"
- 2597. "The Banks of Coquet"
- 2598. "The Maid of Seventeen"
- 2599. "My Bonny Miner Lad"
- 2600. "Jenny Dang the Weaver"

=== 2601 to 2700 ===
- 2601. "My Sailor Laddie"
- 2602. "As I Got Up One Morning"
- 2603. "The Lady on the Mountain"
- 2604. "Down by the River"
- 2605. "Isabella"
- 2606. "Three Sheep Skins"
- 2607. "The Angler's Song in Praise of the Coquet"
- 2608. "At Home Wad I Be"
- 2609. "The Banks of Tyne"
- 2610. No record
- 2611. "Dol-li-a"
- 2612. "The Mouse's Song"
- 2613. "O How I Love Somebody"
- 2614. "Rest Warrior Rest"
- 2615. No record
- 2616. "Derwentwater's Farewell"
- 2617. "The Roses Blaw"
- 2618. "The Singin' Hinnie"
- 2619. "Blow the Wind Southerly"
- 2620. "Skipper's Wedding"
- 2621. "Shallow Brown"
- 2622. No record
- 2623. "The Blackball Line"
- 2624. "Blow the Man Down"
- 2625. "Hanging Johnny"
- 2626. "Ranzo"
- 2627. "Roll the Cotton Down"
- 2628. "Sally Brown"
- 2629. "We'll Pay Paddy Doyle"
- 2630. "When I Was Bound Apprentice in Fair London City"
- 2631. "The Queen's Health"
- 2632. "The Benjamin's Lamentations"
- 2633. No record
- 2634. "Old Militia Song"
- 2635. "Betty and Her Ducks"
- 2636. "Flandyke Shore"
- 2640. "The Crafty Farmer" (Child 283)
- 2641. "Lucy's Flittin"
- 2642. "The Adventures of Sandy and Donald to the Plains of Waterloo"
- 2643. "Rob O' the Capper"
- 2644. "Newcastle Lullaby"
- 2645. "The Brisk Young Country Lady"
- 2646. "Poacher's Song"
- 2647. "Nature's Gay Day"
- 2648. "Pretty Frances", "O When I Was a Maiden"
- 2649. "The Wind", "I'll Tell Me Ma"
- 2650. "Round and Round the Village"
- 2651. "The Old Mare"
- 2652. "Auld Robin Gray"
- 2653. "Ben Bolt"
- 2654. "The Bard of Armagh"
- 2655. "Nightingale in the East"
- 2656. "Gentle Annie"
- 2657. "Go It Neddy"
- 2658. "Gossipping Wife"
- 2659. "Hard Times Come Again No More"
- 2660. "Footprints in the Snow"
- 2661. "Irish Emigrant"
- 2662. "The Ivy Green"
- 2663. "Joe in the Copper"
- 2664. "Love Was Once a Little Boy"
- 2665. "Blue Eyed Nelly"
- 2666. "Old Dog Tray"
- 2667. "The Old Dog Tray"
- 2668. "Poor Dog Tray"
- 2669. "Old Musketeer"
- 2670. "Out in the Green Fields"
- 2671. "Pitcher of Water"
- 2672. "Poor Little Sweep"
- 2673. "The Post Captain"
- 2674. "Remember Love Remember"
- 2675. "Robin's Petition"
- 2676. "Sailor's Grave"
- 2677. "The Scarlet Flower"
- 2678. "And Has She Then Failed"
- 2679. "Single Days of Old"
- 2680. "Skipper And His Boy"
- 2681. "Phoebe Morel"
- 2682. "Smiling Tom"
- 2683. "Tara's Old Hall"
- 2684. "The Spanish Cavalier"
- 2685. "Tom Moody"
- 2686. "Up With the Lark in the Morning"
- 2687. "Wandering Bard"
- 2688. "When We Were Boys Together"
- 2689. "Willie We Have Missed You"
- 2690. "A Woman Never Knows When Her Day's Work's Done"
- 2691. "Oh Won't You Tell Me Why Robin"
- 2692. "The Gypsy's Warning"
- 2693. "The Lovely Sweet Banks of the Bride"
- 2694. "The Ship is Ready to Sail Away"
- 2695. "Farewell to the Village"
- 2696. "The Blackwater Side"
- 2697. "Times Are Hard"
- 2698. "The Pirate's Serenade"
- 2699. "The Wounded Hussar"
- 2700. "The Soldier's Return"

=== 2701 to 2800 ===
- 2701. No record
- 2702. "Willie Wastle"
- 2703. "Old Blind Horse"
- 2704. "Six Sweethearts"
- 2705. "Biddy Rooney"
- 2706. "The Jealous Lover"
- 2707. "When I Wake In the Morning"
- 2708. No record
- 2709. "The Swan"
- 2710. "It's Let Go Your Bowline"
- 2711. No record
- 2712. "Drimendroo"
- 2713. "Springhill Mine Disaster"
- 2714. "The Swallow"
- 2715. "Along the Shores of Boularderie"
- 2716. "Trip to the North Pole", "Tom Cornealy"
- 2717. "Cape Breton Murder"
- 2718. "Eight Famous Fishermen"
- 2719. "Newfoundland Sealing Song"
- 2720. "Nova Scotia Sealing Song"
- 2721. "The Miramichi Fire" (Laws G24)
- 2722. "Cotton Wool Pie"
- 2723. "Harbour Grace"
- 2724. "The Halifax Explosion" (Laws G28)
- 2725. "Lonely Belvedere"
- 2726. "The Hills and Glens"
- 2727. No record
- 2728. "When I Go Up to Shinum Place"
- 2729. "Indian Methodist Conversion", "The Indian Hymn"
- 2730. "By Kells Waters"
- 2731. "In Cupid's Court"
- 2732. "When First to This Country"
- 2733. "Down By the Seaside"
- 2734. "Yougal Harbour"
- 2735. "Captain With the Whiskers"
- 2736. "Echo Mocks the Corncrake"
- 2737. "The Galway Shawl"
- 2738. "Whistling Thief"
- 2739. "The Wee Article"
- 2740. "The Flower of Gortade"
- 2741. "Soldier's Farewell to Manchester"
- 2742. "The Moorlough Shore"
- 2743. "Craiganee"
- 2744. "The Flower of Dunaff Hill"
- 2745. "The Flower of Sweet Strabane"
- 2746. "The Town of Antrim"
- 2747. "The Shamrock Sod No More"
- 2748. "Killy Wells"
- 2749. No record
- 2750. "Molly Agnew"
- 2751. "A New Broom Sweeps Clean"
- 2752. "As I Roved Out One Evening"
- 2753. "Jimmy and Nancy", "Johnnie to Molly"
- 2754. "Just As I Was Going Away"
- 2755. "There Was a Wealthy Farmer"
- 2756. No record
- 2757. "It's Five Long Years", "The Inconstant Sailor and the Distracted Maiden"
- 2758. "Sally to her Bedchamber"
- 2759. "The Perjured Maid"
- 2760. "Bob Vail Was a Butcher Boy"
- 2761. "Doherty's Wake"
- 2762. "The Peanut Stand"
- 2763. No record
- 2764. "Mick Magee"
- 2765. "Pat and the Gauger"
- 2766. "Song of All Nations"
- 2767. "Cold Water Song"
- 2768. "Rock-a-bye Baby"
- 2769. "Murder Song"
- 2770. "Peter Wheeler"
- 2771. "Daniel O'Connel"
- 2772. "Green Grow the Rashes O"
- 2773. "Henry Stewart"
- 2774. "I'll Not Marry At All"
- 2775. "It Was at the Town of Caylen"
- 2776. "I Will Sail the Salt Seas Over"
- 2777. "The Red Mantle"
- 2778. "Once I Had a Daughter"
- 2779. No record
- 2780. "My Youthful Days"
- 2781. "Seven Years in Dublin"
- 2782. "She Bargained With a Captain"
- 2783. "The Jenny Saviour"
- 2784. "New Ireland Song"
- 2785. "Out to Dark Harbour"
- 2786. No record
- 2787. "Buren's Grove"
- 2788. "Sweet Rose of Killarney"
- 2789. "Erin A'Green"
- 2790. "The Flower of Sweet Erin the Green"
- 2791. "Betsey of Dundee"
- 2792. "Robin-a-Thrush"
- 2793. "Two Little Girls in Blue"
- 2794. "Pat O'Donnell"
- 2795. "The Old Elm Tree"
- 2796. "Southern Cross"
- 2797. "Driving the Saw-Logs on the Plover"
- 2798. "I Had But Fifty Cents", "Eighteen Pence"
- 2799. "The Drunkard's Horse"
- 2800. "The Yellow Rose of Texas"

=== 2801 to 2900 ===
- 2801. "The Dying Sargent", "A British Soldier"
- 2802. "Virginia's Bloody Soil"
- 2803. "The Days of Forty Nine"
- 2804. "Curly Head of Hair"
- 2805. "Felix the Soldier"
- 2806. "Joe Bowers"
- 2807. "Get Up Jack"
- 2808. "Behind these Stone Walls"
- 2809. "Fisherman's Girl"
- 2810. No record
- 2811. "Sweet William of Plymouth"
- 2812. "Beautiful Lady of Kent"
- 2813. "The London Lawyer's Son"
- 2814. "The Carrier Dove"
- 2815. "The Flag of Liberty"
- 2816. "Rose of Ardee"
- 2817. "Old Grannau Weal"
- 2818. "Eliza"
- 2819. "Lily Dale"
- 2820. "Sparking Saturday Night"
- 2821. "I've Been Roaming"
- 2822. No record
- 2823. "Lady Washington"
- 2824. "Old England Forty Years Ago"
- 2825. "Wasp Stinging Frolic"
- 2826. "Perry's Victory"
- 2827. "Noble Lads of Canada"
- 2828. "The Maid of Monterrey"
- 2829. "Buena Vista"
- 2830. "The Used-Up Miner"
- 2831. "The Liberty Ball"
- 2832. "A Song For the Campaign"
- 2833. "The True American"
- 2834. "The Empire Club"
- 2835. "Wait for the Wagon"
- 2836. "Nancy Till"
- 2837. No record
- 2838. "The Gospel Ship"
- 2839. "Bright Canaan"
- 2840. No record
- 2841. "The Lone Pilgrim"
- 2842. "Alknomook"
- 2843. "The Indian Hunter"
- 2844. "The Indian Student"
- 2845. "The Banks of the Schuylkill"
- 2846. "The Sweeper"
- 2847. "The Temperance Ship"
- 2848. "The Watcher"
- 2849. "Roving Bachelor"
- 2850. No record
- 2851. "Old Enoch"
- 2852. "The Gunner and the Boatswain"
- 2853. "The Plains of Waterloo"
- 2854. "Turn the Glasses Over"
- 2855. "Come Come Pretty Maids"
- 2856. "Half-Past Ten"
- 2857. "The Forfar Soldier"
- 2858. "Imph'm"
- 2859. "The Laird O' Cockpen"
- 2860. "Young Waters" (Child 94)
- 2861. "The Battle of Harlaw" (Child 163)
- 2862. "Flodden Field" (Child 168)
- 2863. "The Raid of the Reswire"
- 2864. "The Highland Balow", "Lady Bothwell's Lament"
- 2865. "The Wee Wee Man" (Child 38)
- 2866. "Gillicrankie"
- 2867. "The Battle of Sherrifmuir"
- 2868. "Andro and His Cutty Gun"
- 2869. "Hicks' Farewell"
- 2870. "Swinging in the Lane", "Rosie Nell"
- 2871. "When the Roses Bloom Again"
- 2872. "The Scranky Black Farmer"
- 2873. "Lamachree and Magrum"
- 2874. "Sandy and Nap"
- 2875. "Sandy's Mill"
- 2876. "The Rinaway Bride"
- 2877. "The Fall of Napoleon"
- 2878. "The Hunting of Ruberslaw"
- 2879. "The Shepherd's Virtuous Daughter"
- 2880. "Young John Hiland"
- 2881. "Annie Moore"
- 2882. "The Orangeman's Walk", "The Cavan Buck"
- 2883. "The Hills of Greenmore", "The Granemore Hare"
- 2884. "The Hills of Tandragee"
- 2885. "The Hills of Tandragee"
- 2886. "The Dream", "The Bureau"
- 2887. "Ellen O'Connor"
- 2888. "Wild Slieve Gallion Braes"
- 2889. "Cromie's Orange Buck"
- 2890. "Hiring Fair and Hamiltonsbawn", "The Fair of Ross"
- 2891. "Poor Flora On the Banks of the Boyne"
- 2892. "The Park in Portadown"
- 2893. "The Magdalen Green"
- 2894. "The Lass Amongst the Heather"
- 2895. "St. Patrick's Day in the Morning"
- 2896. "The Muttonburn Stream"
- 2897. "Jaunting Car"
- 2898. "Sale of a Wife"
- 2899. "In Praise of John Magee"
- 2900. "The Emigrant's Farewell"

=== 2901 to 3000 ===
- 2901. "Lovely Jane From Enniskea"
- 2902. "Dick Mooney's Daughter"
- 2903. "The Bonnie Wee Lassie Who Never Said No"
- 2904. "Thousands are Sailing"
- 2905. No record
- 2906. "My Charming Edward Boyle"
- 2907. "That Dang Boat that First Took Me Over"
- 2908. "The Glasgow Barber"
- 2909. "The Sinking of the Graf Spree"
- 2910. "The Orange Maid of Sligo"
- 2911. "The Shady Woods of Trough"
- 2912. "The Shamrock Boys from Kill"
- 2913. "Jackson and Jane"
- 2914. "General Guinness"
- 2915. "Ould Heelball You're Boozing Again"
- 2916. "The Irish Jubilee"
- 2917. "Laurell Hill"
- 2918. "Mary of Kilmore"
- 2919. "The Clones Murder", "Fee and Flannigan"
- 2920. "The Lisburn Maid"
- 2921. "Sargent Neill"
- 2922. "The Follom Brown-red"
- 2923. "The Molly Maguires"
- 2924. "Paddy Shinihan's Cow"
- 2925. "The Hills of Tyrone"
- 2926. "Columbia the Free", "Land of my Birth"
- 2927. "Lough Ooney"
- 2928. "The Flower of Corby Mill"
- 2929. "Johnny Harte"
- 2930. "The Belfast Maid"
- 2931. No record
- 2932. "Hunting Song"
- 2933. "The Pony Song"
- 2934. "Apprentice Boy"
- 2935. "The Murder of William Funston"
- 2936. "The Country I Was Born In", "I Have Just Left Donegal"
- 2937. "The Burning of Rosslea"
- 2938. "The Ploughboy"
- 2939. "Carrowclare"
- 2940. "The Tossing of the Hay"
- 2941. "The New-Mown Hay"
- 2942. "The Daysman"
- 2943. "David's Flowery Vale"
- 2944. "The Bonny Moor Hen"
- 2945. "The Blazing Star of Drung"
- 2946. "My Singing Bird"
- 2947. "I Long For To Get Married"
- 2948. "The True Lovers' Discussion"
- 2949. "The Seducer Outwitted"
- 2950. "It's Just About Ten Years Ago"
- 2951. "It Was In the Queen's County"
- 2952. "The Trader"
- 2953. "Come All You Rakish Fine Young Men"
- 2954. "The Close of an Irish Day"
- 2955. "Adam in Paradise"
- 2956. "The Arranmore Disaster"
- 2957. "Copper John"
- 2958. "The Maid of Seventeen"
- 2959. "The Mason's Word"
- 2960. "Minnie Picken"
- 2961. "Moville Along the Foyle"
- 2962. "The New Tractor"
- 2963. "The Parish of Dunboe"
- 2964. "The Son of a Gambolier" (Charles Ives)
- 2965. "The Shores of Benone"
- 2966. "Todd's Sweet Rural Shade"
- 2967. "Three Gipsies Riding"
- 2968. "Coleraine Regatta"
- 2969. "How Pat is Represented"
- 2970. "My Son in Amerikay"
- 2971. "Brannigan's Pup"
- 2972. "Willie was as Fine a Sailor"
- 2973. "The Gentle Boy"
- 2974. "Alan Bain"
- 2975. "Miner Hill"
- 2976. "A Restless Night", "Missouri Song", "Durie Down"
- 2977. "If You Want to Go a Courting"
- 2978. No record
- 2979. "My Little Rambling Rose"
- 2980. "Lasca"
- 2981. "My Mother Was a Lady"
- 2982. "The Two Drummers", "Beaver River"
- 2983. "'Tis Pretty to be in Ballenderry"
- 2984. "Old Ardboe"
- 2985. "The Twisting of the Rope"
- 2986. "The Blighted Lover"
- 2987. "The Rich Man's Daughter"
- 2988. "Young Alvin"
- 2989. "Up in London Fair"
- 2990. "The Wedding at Baltray"
- 2991. "The Maid of Ballymore"
- 2992. "Bold Doherty"
- 2993. "The Tinker and his Budget"
- 2994. "The Wind That Shakes the Barley"
- 2995. "Emigrant's Farewell to His Country"
- 2996. "The Star of Donegal"
- 2997. "Sweet County Wexford"
- 2998. "The Grazier Tribe"
- 2999. "The Bantry Girls' Lament For Johnny"
- 3000. "The Streams of Bunclody"

=== 3001 to 3100 ===
- 3001. "Mary of Dunglow"
- 3002. "Limerick is Beautiful"
- 3003. "Orange Lily O"
- 3004. "The Parting Glass"
- 3005. "Nell Flaherty's Drake"
- 3006. "The Night of Ragman's Ball"
- 3007. "Maid that Sold the Barley"
- 3008. "Henry Joy McCracken"
- 3009. "The Flower of Magherally"
- 3010. "Dunlavin Green"
- 3011. "Lanigan's Ball"
- 3012. "Rocky Road to Dublin" (D.K. Gavan)
- 3013. "The Old Orange Flute"
- 3014. "Kevin Barry"
- 3015. "The Boys of Wexford"
- 3016. "Sporting Youth"
- 3017. "Dublin Jack of All Trades"
- 3018. "The Limerick Rake"
- 3019. "Eliza"
- 3020. "Father Murphy", "The Wexford Heroes"
- 3021. "Bold McDermott Roe"
- 3022. "Bold Belfast Shoemaker"
- 3023. "Suit of Green"
- 3024. "The Rocks of Bawn"
- 3025. "The Maid of Sweet Gortein"
- 3026. "Stonehouse Bay", "The Wreck of the Mary Jane"
- 3027. "The Black Horse"
- 3028. "The Smashing of the Van"
- 3029. "The Manchester Martyrs"
- 3030. "The Piper's Tunes"
- 3031. "The Sporting Races of Galaway"
- 3032. "The Maid With the Bonny Brown Hair"
- 3033. "A New Song on the Taxes"
- 3034. "Granuaile"
- 3035. "The Hackler from Groushall"
- 3036. "The Bold Rake"
- 3037. "The Bann Water Side"
- 3038. "Lillibullero"
- 3039. "The Sporting Old Grey Mare"
- 3040. "Rossa's Farewell"
- 3041. "A Ballad Of Master McGrath"
- 3042. "Sorrowful Lament for Callaghan, Greally, and Mullen"
- 3043. "Come Each Jolly Fellow", "The Farmer"
- 3044. "I Thank You Ma'am Says Dan"
- 3045. "Come to the Bower"
- 3046. "Red Haired Man's Wife"
- 3047. "John McGoldrick's Trial for the Quaker's Daughter"
- 3048. "Lovely Kate of Liskelhaun"
- 3049. "Bachelor's Walk"
- 3050. "The Boys of Old Erin on the Green"
- 3051. "What Would You Do"
- 3052. "With Kitty I'll Go"
- 3053. "The Little Pack of Tailors"
- 3054. "Swalwell Hopping"
- 3055. "The Northumberland Bagpipes"
- 3056. No record
- 3057. "The Bonnie Redesdale Lassie"
- 3058. "Pitman's Courtship"
- 3059. "The Keel Row"
- 3060. "Canny Newcassel"
- 3061. "Jemmy Joneson's Wherry"
- 3062. "Sair Fyel'd Hinny"
- 3063. "Pawkie Paiterson's Auld Grey Yaud", "Robin Spraggon's Old Grey Mare"
- 3064. "Bonny at Morn"
- 3065. "Elsie Marley"
- 3066. "Bold Robert Emmet"
- 3067. "Pat of Mullingar"
- 3068. "Poor Old Granuaile"
- 3069. "The Foot and Mouth Disease"
- 3070. "The Sargent's Lamentation"
- 3071. "Lamentations of Patrick Brady"
- 3072. "Farewell to Lissycasey"
- 3073. "Farewell to Milltown"
- 3074. "An Cailin Deas"
- 3075. "The Cottage With the Horseshoe O'er the Door"
- 3076. "A Stor Mo Chroi"
- 3077. "The Bobbed Hair"
- 3078. "Paddy the Cockney and the Ass"
- 3079. "Paddy's Panacea"
- 3080. "The Beggarman of County Down"
- 3081. "You Ribbonmen of Ireland"
- 3082. No record
- 3083. "I'm a Rambling Youth"
- 3084. "Napoleon Bonaparte"
- 3085. "The Weaver"
- 3086. "As I Strayed Through Dublin City"
- 3087. "The Orkney Style of Courtship"
- 3088. "The Canny Shepherd Laddie of the Hills"
- 3089. "The Gresford Disaster"
- 3090. "Rhynie"
- 3091. "The Ould Piper"
- 3092. "Paddy West"
- 3093. "The Quaker"
- 3094. "The Campanero"
- 3095. "The Boatie Rows"
- 3096. No record
- 3097. "The Boat that First Brought Me Over"
- 3098. "The Recruiting Officer", "The Merry Volunteers"
- 3099. "Prince Charlie Stuart"
- 3100. "Lang Johnny More" (Child 251)

=== 3101 to 3200 ===
- 3101. "Rub-a-Dub-Dub"
- 3102. "Camborne Hill"
- 3103. "Black Is the Color (of My True Love's Hair)"
- 3104. "The Seven Irishmen"
- 3105. "O'Brien of Tippetary"
- 3106. "The Rollicking Boys Around Tandaragee"
- 3107. "Waterford Boys"
- 3108. "Sheela Nee Eyre"
- 3109. "Bloom of Erin"
- 3110. "Bonny Tavern Green"
- 3111. "Poor Little Joe"
- 3112. "The Drunkard's Ragged Wean"
- 3113. "The Drunkard's Doom"
- 3114. "The Old Brown Coat"
- 3115. No record
- 3116. "The Letter Edged in Black"
- 3117. "The Pardon of Sydna Allen"
- 3118. No record
- 3119. "Deep Blue Sea"
- 3120. "I'm Satisfied"
- 3121. "Howdy Bill"
- 3122. "An' We're a Noddin'"
- 3123. "The Monkey's Wedding"
- 3124. "Boll Weevil (song)" (Laws I17)
- 3125. "Groundhog"
- 3126. "Kentucky Moonshiner"
- 3127. "Four Thousand Years Ago" "The Highly Educated Man"
- 3128. "William Cook"
- 3129. "The Charlie Song"
- 3130. "Fair Lady of the Plains"
- 3131. "The Arkansas Song"
- 3132. "The Allegheny"
- 3133. "Battle of Pea Ridge"
- 3134. "Good News From Home"
- 3135. "Often Drunk and Seldom Sober"
- 3136. "The Drummer and the Cook", "Walking Tub of Butter"
- 3137. "Johnny I Hardly Knew Ye"
- 3138. "Lord Ullin's Daughter"
- 3140. "A Virgin Most Pure"
- 3141. "Admiral Benbow"
- 3142. "Spottee"
- 3143. "The Tyne Exile's Lament"
- 3144. "The Fiery Clock Fiece"
- 3145. "Cappy the Pitman's Dog"
- 3146. "Bob Cranky's 'Size Sunday"
- 3147. "Captain Bover"
- 3148. "Bob Cranky's Adieu"
- 3149. "Aboot the Bush Willy"
- 3150. "O the Bonny Fisher Lad"
- 3151. "The Mode O' Wooing"
- 3152. "The Shoemaker"
- 3153. "The De'il Stick the Minister"
- 3154. "The Snows They Melt the Soonest"
- 3155. "Up the Raw"
- 3156. "Sawnie Ogilvie's Duel With His Wife"
- 3157. "Jack and Tom"
- 3158. "Derwentwater"
- 3159. "Ca' Hawkie Through the Water"
- 3160. "The Auld Fisher's Farewell to Coquet"
- 3161. "I Wish Your Mother Would Come"
- 3162. "Go to Kye Wi' Me"
- 3163. "Success Unto the Coal Trade"
- 3164. "My Lord 'Size"
- 3165. "Shew Me the Way to Wallington"
- 3166. "Felton Lonnin / The Kye Have Come Hame"
- 3167. "The Miller's Wife o' Blaydon"
- 3168. "Mawe Canny Hinny"
- 3169. "The Antigallican Privateer"
- 3170. "The Sandgate Lassie's Lament"
- 3171. No record
- 3172. "The Pitman's Happy Times"
- 3173. "All Together Like the Folks O' Shields"
- 3174. "Here's the Tender Coming"
- 3175. "The Battle of Boulogne"
- 3176. "The Laidley Worm of Spindleston-Heugh"
- 3177. "Maw Bonny Gyetside Lass"
- 3178. "The Sandgate Lass on the Ropery Banks"
- 3179. "Liberty for the Sailors"
- 3180. "Newcassel is my Native Place"
- 3181. "My Laddie Sits O'er Late Up"
- 3182. "The Hexhamshire Lass"
- 3183. "The Song of Upper Wharfedale"
- 3184. "The White Rose in the Broom"
- 3185. "How Grand and How Bright", "The Worchestershire Carol"
- 3186. "The Whitsun Song"
- 3187. "The Yeovil Murder"
- 3188. "The Holly and the Ivy Girl"
- 3189. "The Trimdon Grange Explosion"
- 3190. "Peggy Rye"
- 3191. "Jowl Jowl and Listen"
- 3192. "The Woman of Leigh"
- 3193. "Blackleg Miner"
- 3194. "I Am An Old Miner"
- 3195. "Queen of Hearts"
- 3196. "Dorsetshire George"
- 3197. "Goodbye Old Ship of Mine"
- 3198. "The Barmaid"
- 3199. "The Travelling Tinker"
- 3200. "The Old Blind Mare"

=== 3201 to 3300 ===
- 3201. "Get a Little Table"
- 3202. No record
- 3203. "My Old Clothes Shop", "Ikey Moses"
- 3204. "The Christmas Goose"
- 3205. "As Shepherds Watched Their Fleecy Care"
- 3206. "Hark How the Heav'nly Angels Sing"
- 3207. "Three Brothers in Fair Warwickshire"
- 3208. "The Hindhead Murder"
- 3209. "Who Owns The Game"
- 3210. "Saviour's Birth", "Hark Hark What News"
- 3211. No record
- 3212. "Allison Gross" (Child 35)
- 3213. "Old Pike"
- 3214. "Life's Like a Ship"
- 3215. "The Burwash Carol"
- 3216. "The Ditchling Carol"
- 3217. "The West Wycombe Band"
- 3218. "Drodlins"
- 3219. "No More I'll Go to Sea"
- 3220. "Lowlands Away"
- 3221. "Doodle Let Me Go (Yellow Girls)"
- 3222. "Bangidero"
- 3223. "Cheery Men"
- 3224. "The Young Little Lambs"
- 3225. "Behold the Grace Appears", "Back Lane"
- 3226. "Sentenced to Death", "Bonny Lassie's Answer", "Lay Him Away Ower the Hillside"
- 3227. "The Schooner Annie" (Laws N28)
- 3228. "The Schooner Huberry"
- 3229. "The Wreck of Old Number Nine" (Laws G26)
- 3230. "Blue-eyed Mary"
- 3231. "Mary Machree"
- 3232. "Thomas and Nancy" (Laws K15)
- 3233. No record
- 3234. "Sweet Betsy from Pike"
- 3235. "Sioux Indians" (Laws B11)
- 3236. "Plantonio" (Laws B12)
- 3237. "Zebra Dun"
- 3238. "Sandy Sam and Rusty Jigs" (Laws B17)
- 3239. "Strawberry Roan" (Laws B18)
- 3240. "The Mountain Meadows Massacre" (Laws B19)
- 3241. No record
- 3242. "Root Hog or Die" (Laws B21)
- 3243. "Sweet Jane" (Laws B22)
- 3244. "Cowboy Jack" (Laws B24)
- 3245. "The Boys of Sanpete County" (Laws B26)
- 3246. "The Tenderfoot" (Laws B27)
- 3247. "The Ballad of Casey Jones" (Laws G1)
- 3248. "Twenty-One Years", "The C & O Wreck" (Laws E16)
- 3249. "Henry K. Sawyer" (Laws G5)
- 3250. "The Avondale Mine Disaster" (Laws G7)
- 3251. "Charley Hill's Old Slope" (Laws G8)
- 3252. No record
- 3253. No record
- 3254. "The Johnstown Flood" (Laws G14)
- 3255. "The Milwaukee Fire" (Laws G15)
- 3256. "Hip Hip Mr. Carpenter"
- 3257. "The Three Drowned Sisters" (Laws G23)
- 3258. "The Two Orphans", "The Brooklyn Theatre Fire" (Laws G27)
- 3259. No record
- 3260. "The Sherman Cyclone" (Laws G31)
- 3261. "The Miners' Fate" (Laws G10)
- 3262. "John Hardy" (Laws I2)
- 3263. "Penitentiary Bound", "Po' Boy" (Laws I4)
- 3264. "Delia Holmes" (Laws I5)
- 3265. "The Railman's Song", "Jessie at the Railway Bar"
- 3266. "Liverpool Dock"
- 3267. "Botany Bay"
- 3268. "Lily Lee"
- 3269. "Coleen Bawn"
- 3270. "Prince Charles He is King James' Son"
- 3271. "Three Wise Old Men", "Three Wise Old Women"
- 3272. "Paddy Magee"
- 3273. "The Fatal Wedding"
- 3274. "Little Nell of Narragansett Bay"
- 3275. "Those Tassels on the Boots"
- 3276. "Darlin Ould Stick"
- 3277. "The Wedding of Ballyporeen"
- 3278. "The Wearing of the Green"
- 3279. "The Wreck of the Atlantic"
- 3280. No record
- 3281. "Frank Fidd"
- 3282. "Reuben Ranzo"
- 3283. "Larry McGee"
- 3284. "The Poor Hard Working Man", "The Daddy of them All"
- 3285. "The Fenian Song"
- 3286. "The Bear River Murder"
- 3287. "The Girl that was Drowned at Onslow" (Laws dG42)
- 3288. "The Wreck of the Glenaloon"
- 3289. "Jolly Sailors Bold"
- 3290. "Droylsden Wakes"
- 3291. "The Whale-Catchers"
- 3292. "The Wreck of the Gilderoy"
- 3293. "The Battle of Otterburn" (Child 161)
- 3294. "The Willow"
- 3295. "The Scolding Wife"
- 3296. "The Outlaw Murray" (Child 305)
- 3297. "Adam Bell", "Clim of the Clough", "William of Cloudesly" (Child 116)
- 3298. "Robin Hood and Allen A Dale" (Child 138)
- 3299. "Robin Hood's Death" (Child 120)
- 3300. "The Orderly Man"

=== 3301 to 3400 ===
- 3301. "Leesome Brand" (Child 15)
- 3302. "The Old Grey Duck"
- 3303. "Mother May I Go out to Swim", "The Alphabet Song"
- 3304. "The Soldier on the Battlefield"
- 3305. "Old Smuggler's Song"
- 3306. "St. Genny's Fox-Hunting Song"
- 3307. "Rouse Rouse"
- 3308. "O What is that Upon Thy Head"
- 3309. "Siege of St. Malo"
- 3310. "Toby"
- 3311. "An Evening So Clear"
- 3312. "Carol for Twelfth Day"
- 3313. "Goodbye Mike Goodbye Pat"
- 3314. "The Robber's Retreat"
- 3315. "Trelawny (The Song of the Western Men)" (Robert Stephen Hawker)
- 3316. "Wheal Rodney"
- 3317. "Miner's Song"
- 3318. "William Coombe"
- 3319. "Cornish Girls"
- 3320. No record
- 3321. "Young Banker", "Banking Boy"
- 3322. "The Bent Sae Brown" (Child 71)
- 3323. "Poor Shepherds"
- 3324. "The Green Woods O' Airlie"
- 3325. "Bleacher Lass o' Kelvinhaugh"
- 3326. "Bonnie Lassie's Answer"
- 3327. "Wreck of the Royal Charter"
- 3328. "If There Be Danger"
- 3329. "Lovely Jane"
- 3330. "Bundle and Go"
- 3331. "We Happy Herdsmen"
- 3332. "The Son of God They Did Betray"
- 3333. "Twelve Articles"
- 3334. "The Irish Boy"
- 3335. "Rose Red and the White Lily" (Child 103)
- 3336. "Prince Heathen" (Child 104)
- 3337. "Poor Old Maidens"
- 3338. "Nelson's Last Victory"
- 3339. "Poor Wayfaring Stranger"
- 3340. "My Good Looking Man"
- 3341. "The Connaught Man's Trip to Belfast"
- 3342. "The Old Tobacco Box" "The Old Beggar" "There Was An Old Soldier"
- 3343. "Birnie Bouzle"
- 3344. "Jockey to the Fair"
- 3345. "The Miracle Flower"
- 3346. "Go Tell Aunt Rhody"
- 3347. No record
- 3348. "Many Thousand Go"
- 3349. "In That Morning"
- 3350. "Jessie and Jimmie"
- 3351. "Busk and Go Dearie Go", "Mary's Ass"
- 3352. "The Death of Ben Hall"
- 3353. No record
- 3354. "Billy Brown"
- 3355. "Muldoon the Solid Man"
- 3356. "List Bonnie Laddie"
- 3357. "Cuttie's Wedding"
- 3358. "The Gallowa' Hills"
- 3359. "Bonnie Lass Come O'er the Burn"
- 3360. "Far Over the Forth"
- 3361. "Eenst Upon a Time"
- 3362. "Oh Jeannie My Dear"
- 3363. "The Braes of Killiecrankie"
- 3364. "Jamis Telfer of the Fair Dodhead" (Child 190)
- 3365. "The Girls of Shamrock Shore"
- 3366. "I've Been a Wild Boy"
- 3367. "One and Twenty"
- 3368. "A Little Cocksparrow"
- 3369. "Poison Beer"
- 3370. "Peter Paynter"
- 3371. "The Costermonger's Song"
- 3372. "Botany Bay"
- 3373. "One Day as I Rambled Through Glasgow"
- 3374. "The Pride of Cloonkeen"
- 3375. "Peter Heaney"
- 3376. "The Sea Captain"
- 3377. "The Old Caravee"
- 3378. "The Wee Weaver"
- 3379. "Donall Og"
- 3380. "The Reaping of the Rushes Green"
- 3381. "One Morning in June"
- 3382. "Drinking Strong Whiskey"
- 3383. "Sweet Omagh Town"
- 3384. "My Old Cottage Home"
- 3385. "Little Chance", "How Tedious and Tasteless (the Hours)", "Edgefield", "Greenfields"
- 3386. "The Old Churchyard"
- 3387. "Roane County Prison Song"
- 3388. "I'm a Stranger in this Country"
- 3389. "The Heilanman's Ball"
- 3390. "Johnny McIndoe"
- 3391. "Robin Hood and the Beggar, I" (Child 133)
- 3392. "Robin Hood and the Beggar, II" (Child 134)
- 3393. "The Duke of Athole's Nurse" (Child 212)
- 3394. "Brown Eyes"
- 3395. "Brother Green"
- 3396. "East Virginia"
- 3397. "Kaiser and the Hindenberger"
- 3398. "Young Lady in the Bloom of Youth"
- 3399. "Lonely Tombs"
- 3400. "I Saw a Light All in a Dream"

=== 3401 to 3500 ===
- 3401. "Bright and Shining City"
- 3402. "Over in the Glory Land"
- 3403. "Father Took a Light", "Mother's Got a Light and Gone to Heaven"
- 3404. "Climbing Up Zion's Hill"
- 3405. No record
- 3406. "Lord I've Started for the Kingdom"
- 3407. "I'm Alone in this World"
- 3408. "No Hiding Place Down Here"
- 3409. "Can the Circle Be Unbroken (By and By)"
- 3410. "I Saw the Light"
- 3411. No record
- 3412. "Yankee Song"
- 3413. "Cumberland Gap"
- 3414. "Big Stone Gap"
- 3415. "Back in the Hills"
- 3416. "The Gambler" (Laws dE43)
- 3417. "Icy Mountain"
- 3418. "Short Life of Trouble"
- 3419. "Chilly Winds"
- 3420. "Greenback Dollar"
- 3421. "In the Pines", "Where Did You Sleep Last Night"
- 3422. "My Trunk is Packed"
- 3423. "Reuben"
- 3424. "Goodbye My Lover", "Cripple Creek"
- 3425. "Old Bald Eagle"
- 3426. "Black-Eyed Susie"
- 3427. "The Blue-Eyed Gal"
- 3428. "Georgia Buck"
- 3429. "Ida Red"
- 3430. "I'm A Longin' For to Go to This Road"
- 3431. "Yonder Comes My Love"
- 3432. "Sugar Hill"
- 3433. "Shoo Fly"
- 3434. "Cripple Creek" "Cabin Creek"
- 3435. "Lulu", "Old Corn Whiskey"
- 3436. "Old Coon Dog"
- 3437. "Mule Skinner Blues"
- 3438. "The Old Chisholm Trail"
- 3439. "One Cold and Frosty Morning"
- 3440. "Did You Ever See the Devil Uncle Joe"
- 3441. "Johnny Booker"
- 3442. "Ole Grey Mare"
- 3443. "The Fox Chase"
- 3444. "Goin Down Town", "Lynchburg Town"
- 3445. "Forsaken Love"
- 3446. "Weeping Sad and Lonely"
- 3447. "The Plooman Laddie"
- 3448. "The Plooman Laddies"
- 3449. "When I Was Noo but Sweet Sixteen"
- 3450. "Bonny Udny"
- 3451. "The Jolly Sportsman"
- 3452. No record
- 3453. "Lace Maker's Song"
- 3454. "A Poor Aviator Lay Dying"
- 3455. "To Sheepshearing We Will Go"
- 3456. "Ladies Won't You Marry"
- 3457. "Down By the Dark Arches"
- 3458. "Kissing"
- 3459. "Hecketty Pecketty"
- 3460. "The Drunken Man"
- 3461. "Through Lonesome Woods"
- 3462. "As I Was Walking Down Old Green Lane", "A Collier Lad"
- 3463. "Cottage for Sale"
- 3464. "Cock a doodle doo"
- 3465. "Strike For Better Wages"
- 3466. "Drinking"
- 3467. "John Wesley"
- 3468. No record
- 3469. "Taunton Gaol"
- 3470. "The Factory Doll"
- 3471. "Calliforney"
- 3472. "We Be"
- 3473. "Banks of the Band"
- 3474. "The Blackbird of Mullaghmore"
- 3475. "Bonny Portmore"
- 3476. "Lough Erin's Shore"
- 3477. "The Maid of Ballydoo"
- 3478. "The Purple Boy"
- 3479. "The Deluded Lover", "As I Roved Out"
- 3480. "The Waggoner"
- 3481. "Adam Buckham"
- 3482. "Hap an Row"
- 3483. "Diddle Diddle, Or The Kind Country Lovers", "Lavender's Blue"
- 3484. "The Banks of the Dee"
- 3485. "Little Chance"
- 3486. "Celebrated Working Man", "In The Bar-room", "Shovellin' Back the Slate"
- 3487. "The Bonny Pitt Laddie"
- 3488. "Byker Hill", "Walker Pits", "Walker Pit and Byker Shore"
- 3489. "The Iron Man"
- 3490. "Stanley Market"
- 3491. "Poverty Knock"
- 3492. "Macadam and Co."
- 3493. "Greenhill Farm"
- 3494. "The Knocking-Up Song"
- 3495. "Twenty-Pound Dog"
- 3496. "Three Jolly Fishermen"
- 3497. "The Old Yow"
- 3498. "The Shepherd and the Shepherdess"
- 3499. "Macalpine's Navvy Gang"
- 3500. "The Bold Miner"

=== 3501 to 3600 ===
- 3501. "The Miner's Life"
- 3502. "Down in a Coal Mine"
- 3503. "The Recruited Collier", "Jimmy's Enlisted"
- 3504. "Cushie Butterfield", "Lambton Worm" (See also Roud 2337)
- 3505. "The Rolling Sailor"
- 3506. "Pick Pick Pick"
- 3507. "Geordy Black"
- 3508. "The Collier's Lament"
- 3509. "The Donibristle Disaster"
- 3510. "Miner's Lifeguard", "A Miner's Life"
- 3511. "Blaydon Races"
- 3512. "The Hairst O' Rettie"
- 3513. "The Boys in Blue", "He's Coming to Us Dead", "Express Office"
- 3514. "Ten Thousand Miles Away", "On the Banks of that Lonely River", "Homesick Boy", "I Have an Aged Mother"
- 3515. "Milking Pails", "Mother, Mother", "Betsy's Gone A-Milking"
- 3516. "The Broke-Down Brakeman"
- 3517. "Ehren On the Rhine"
- 3518. "The Wreck at Maud"
- 3519. "A Restless Heart"
- 3520. "Mandy"
- 3521. "Don't Go Out Tonight My Darling"
- 3522. "Little Jim"
- 3523. "No Telephone in Heaven"
- 3524. "The Drownded Boy:
- 3525. "The Titanic"
- 3526. "The Great Titanic"
- 3527. "Pictures From Life's Other Side"
- 3528. "Madge", "Just Tell Them That You Saw Me"
- 3529. "In the Baggage Coach Ahead"
- 3530. "The Dying Girl's Message"
- 3531. "Jim Blake"
- 3532. "The Dying Nun"
- 3533. "The Juice of the Forbidden Fruit"
- 3534. "Charlie Brooks"
- 3535. "The Broken Engagement"
- 3536. "I'll Hang My Harp on the Willow"
- 3537. "Don't Forget Me, Little Darling"
- 3538. "I Love Little Willie"
- 3539. "Cruel Father"
- 3540. "Palms of Victory", "The Wayworn Traveler"
- 3541. "A Dying Soldier"
- 3542. "They Say I am Nobody's Darling"
- 3543. "The Prisoner at the Bar"
- 3544. "Gambling on the Sabbath Day"
- 3545. "Little Joe"
- 3546. "Little Moses"
- 3547. "Molly Flynn"
- 3548. "At Turner's Hill"
- 3549. "The Death of Nelson"
- 3550. "This Old Man"
- 3551. "Young Sandy"
- 3552. "Tom Block"
- 3553. "Old Barlow Was Blind"
- 3554. "Cock of the North"
- 3555. "Little Tommy Brown", "The Dirty Old Lady"
- 3556. "Fair Norwich Town"
- 3557. "The Falmer Murder"
- 3558. "Cows Won't Milk and Bulls Won't Roar", "The Ferrets and the Weasels"
- 3559. [no record]
- 3560. The Grand Revue at Dover
- 3561. "The Black and Rolling Eye"
- 3562. "Hole in Her Stocking"
- 3563. "I'm Stationed At Low Fell"
- 3564. "I Put My Hand Upon Her Head"
- 3565. no record
- 3566. "Johnny Used to Grind the Coffee Mill", "Fiddling the Till"
- 3567. "Micky Dunn's Last Night"
- 3568. "The Tunbridge Wells Murder"
- 3569. "Taglioni Coat"
- 3570. "Loss of Seven Clergymen"
- 3571. "The Heath Clas Hills Where the Shamrock Grow"
- 3572. "The Rambling Irishman", "The Banks of Sweet Lough Erne"
- 3573. "The Tamlaught Stone"
- 3574. "The Hare's Dream", "The Hare's Lament"
- 3575. "Glenarm Bay"
- 3576. "Willie Rambler"
- 3577. "Wild Slieve Gallon Brae"
- 3578. no record
- 3579. "Belfast Town", "The Cavehill Diamond"
- 3580. "The Footboy"
- 3581. "The Breaking of Omagh Jail"
- 3582. "Ten Thousand Miles", "Fare You Well, My Darling"
- 3583. "Trench Blues"
- 3584. "Ox-Driving Song", "The Waggoner"
- 3585. "Diamond Joe"
- 3586. "If He'd Be a Buckaroo"
- 3587. "Doney Gal"
- 3588. "My Bonny Irish Boy"
- 3589. "Pompey Smash" "The Ballad of Davy Crockett"
- 3590. "Too Late", "Now You Have Come Back to Me", "Lover's Return"
- 3591. "Lorena"
- 3592. "Joe Stiner", "Battle of Wilson Creek"
- 3593. "Skip to My Lou"
- 3594. "Old Joe Clark"
- 3595. "Going to Boston"
- 3596. "Hog Drovers"
- 3597. "Love Has Gained the Day"
- 3598. "The Jolly Union Boys"
- 3599. "Home on the Range"
- 3600. "Sloan Wellesley", "In the County of Innocent", "The Drowning of Young Robinson"

=== 3601 to 3700 ===
- 3601. "My Dearest Dear"
- 3602. "Swannanoa Tunnel", "Asheville Junction"
- 3603. "Harding's Defeat"
- 3604. "The Dreary Black Hills"
- 3605. "Seven Long Years", "My Father He Gave Me a Lump of Gold"
- 3606. "Come All You Young and Handsome Girls", "Little Willie", "When I Was in My Sixteenth Year"
- 3607. "Sally Buck"
- 3608. "The Rocky Mountain Top", "White Oak Mountain"
- 3609. "Betty Anne"
- 3610. "True Love From the Eastern Shore"
- 3611. "Every Night When the Sun Goes In", "Careless Love"
- 3612. "I Love My Love"
- 3613. "Samuel Young" (Laws dA34)
- 3614. "Daniel in the Lion's Den"
- 1615. "Jesse Cole"
- 3616. "Way Down the Ohio"
- 3617. "The Crow-Fish Man"
- 3618. "Lulie"
- 3619. "The Old Grey Goose", "Saturday Night My Wife Did Die"
- 3620. "Hold On", "Mary Wears a Golden Chain"
- 3621. "The Squirrel", "The Raccoon's Tail"
- 3622. "Snake Baked a Hoecake", "The Churning Song"
- 3623. "Phoebe in Her Petticoat"
- 3624. "The Tottenham Toad", "All Got a Mate But Me"
- 3625. "I Wonder Where Mariah's Gone"
- 3626. "One Cold Winter's Morning"
- 3627. "I Whipped My Horse"
- 3628. "Black Phyllis"
- 3629. "Victory Won at Richmond" (Laws dA37)
- 3630. "This Night We Part Forever", "Broken Vows"
- 3631. "Don't Forget Me Little Darling"
- 3632. "Roll the Old Chariot"
- 3633. no record
- 3634. "Rain and Snow"
- 3635. "Ibby Damsel"
- 3636. "The Lost Babe"
- 3637. "The Lonesome Dove"
- 3638. "Ha Ha Ha"
- 3639. "Noah's Ark"
- 3640. "Niagara Falls"
- 3641. "The Fateful Blow"
- 3642. "The Kissing Song", "Sock Her On Her Kisser"
- 3643. "Yonder Stands Young Couple", "The Marrying Play"
- 3644. "Shoot the Buffalo"
- 3645. "Early Sunday Morning", "The Dolly-Play Song"
- 3646. "Doctor Jones"
- 3647. "Up She Rises"
- 3648. "The Higher Up the Cherry Tree"
- 3649. "Fine Brick House", "Swing the Ladies"
- 3650. "The Chickens They Are Crowing", "My Pappy He Will Scold Me"
- 3651. "Reap Boys Reap"
- 3652. "Sally Anne"
- 3653. "The Opossum"
- 3654. "Liza Anne"
- 3655. "Sugar Babe"
- 3656. "Eliza Jane"
- 3657. "Give the Fiddler a Dram"
- 3658. "Gone to Cripple Creek"
- 3659. "Porto Rico"
- 3660. "Run Nigger Run"
- 3661. "Marina Girls"
- 3662. "O This Door Locked"
- 3663. "The Shad"
- 3664. "'Tis a Wonder"
- 3665. "Barber's Cry"
- 3666. "The Bridle and Saddle"
- 3667. "Betsy of Dramoor"
- 3668. "The Lass of Dunmore"
- 3669. "Anson Best"
- 3670. "Nat Goodwin"
- 3671. "The Song of Joaquin", "Wakken"
- 3672. "The Widow's Plea"
- 3673. "At the Jail"
- 3674. "A Laundry Song"
- 3675. "John Whipple's Mill"
- 3676. "How We Got Back to the Woods Last Year"
- 3677. "Bill Dunbar"
- 3678. "Young Conway"
- 3679. "The Cold Black River Stream"
- 3680. "The Grand River" (Laws dC35)
- 3681. "The Baskatong"
- 3682. "Hogan's Lake"
- 3683. "Vince Leahy"
- 3684. no record
- 3685. "Blood on the Saddle"
- 3686. "My Wife Went Away and Left Me", "Things Impossible"
- 3687. "Taxation of America"
- 3688. "The Lady Elgin"
- 3689. "Betty Brown"
- 3690. no record
- 3691. "The Sailor Boy's Dream"
- 3692. "Dear Kitty Gray"
- 3693. "It's Funny When You Feel that Way"
- 3694. "Farewell to Bonny Galway"
- 3695. "The Choice of a Wife"
- 3696. "The American Volunteer"
- 3697. "David Ward"
- 3698. "The War in Missouri in '61", "Martin, Tim, and Dan"
- 3699. "Ben Fisher and Wife"
- 3700. "The Bainbridge Tragedy"

=== 3701 to 3800 ===
- 3701. "A Melancholy Accident: The Death of M. Hodge"
- 3702. no record
- 3703. "Johnny Troy"
- 3704. "Thompson's Old Grey Mule"
- 3705. "Pat's Wedding"
- 3706. "The First Night's Courtship"
- 3707. "Teaching McFadden to Waltz"
- 3708. "The Three Fishermen", "Three Jews"
- 3709. "Old Sheep Went to Sleep"
- 3710. "Animal Song"
- 3711. "One Fine Day", "Badger Hill"
- 3712. "The Hen and the Duck"
- 3713. "The Fox and the Grapes"
- 3714. "Fond of Chewing Gum"
- 3715. "I'll Be All Smiles Tonight"
- 3716. "The Southern Wagon"
- 3717. "There's Nae Luck Aboot the Hoose"
- 3718. "We Are Coming Sister Mary"
- 3719. "Get Away Old Man Get Away"
- 3720. "My Love is On the Ocean"
- 3721. "The Song That Reached My Heart"
- 3722. "The Whummil Bore" (Child 27)
- 3723. "The Queen of Elfan's Nourice" (Child 40)
- 3724. "The Dead Horse Shanty"
- 3725. "All Bound Round With a Woolen String"
- 3726. "Away Down East"
- 3727. "The Bear Went Over the Mountain", "Silver Moonlight Winds are Blowing"
- 3728. "The Bunnit of Straw"
- 3729. "Fair Rosamund"
- 3730. "The Farmington Canal Song"
- 3731. "Fiddle-De-Dee"
- 3732. "First Families of Fall River"
- 3733. "Jolly Old Roger"
- 3734. "Julia Glover"
- 3735. [no record]
- 3736. [no record]
- 3737. "Vermont Sugar-Maker's Song", "Maple Sweet"
- 3738. "The Ocean Burial"
- 3739. "Old Pod-Auger Times"
- 3940. "The Little Market Woman", "The Old Woman and Her Eggs"
- 3741. "The Sawmill Song"
- 3742. "I Saw a Ship A-Sailing", "Duck Dance"
- 3743. "Sweet Kitty Clover"
- 3744. "Three Children Sliding on the Ice"
- 3745. "Too-ril-te-too"
- 3746. "Tyburn Hill"
- 3747. "The Washing Day"
- 3748. "Hey My Kitten"
- 3749. "I Had a Little Nut Tree"
- 3750. "The Mill"
- 3751. "The Oxen Song"
- 3752. "Scotland's Burning"
- 3753. "Three Blind Mice"
- 3754. "The Charming Young Widow"
- 3755. "I'll Give You One More as You Go"
- 3756. "The Arkansas Traveler"
- 3757. no record
- 3758. "The Dodger"
- 3759. "Just Another Broken Heart", "Flirting"
- 3760. "Do Not Heed Her Warning"
- 3761. "The Decision in the Gypsy's Warning"
- 3762. "Trust Him Not"
- 3763. no record
- 3764. "The Girl in the Blue Velvet Band"
- 3765. "Over the Garden Wall"
- 3766. "Sweet Fern"
- 3767. "Puttin' On the Style"
- 3768. "Kitty Clyde"
- 3769. "Three Leaved Shamrock"
- 3770. "Calomel"
- 3771. "The Old Bachelor", "The Crookery Maid"
- 3772. "Skye Boat Song"
- 3773. "Folks that Put on Airs"
- 3774. "Whoa Mule"
- 3775. "Sleepytown"
- 3776. "The Gallant Ninety-Twa"
- 3777. "The Muir of Culloden"
- 3778. "Bonny Woodhall"
- 3779. no record
- 3780. "Nairn River Banks"
- 3781. no record
- 3782. "When You and I Were Young Maggie"
- 3783. "Ythanside"
- 3784. "The Braes O' Invernessie"
- 3785. "Carries and Kye"
- 3786. "O Gin That I Were Mairrit"
- 3787. "The Collier Laddie"
- 3788. "Love's Adieu"
- 3789. "Oor Dochter Jean"
- 3790. "This is No My Ain House"
- 3791. "Admiral Byng and Brave West"
- 3792. "Old Rustic Bridge"
- 3793. "Courtin' in the Stable"
- 3794. "Cairn-o'-mount"
- 3795. "The Smuggler's Song"
- 3796. "My Mither She Feed Me"
- 3797. "The Duke of Argyle's Courtship"
- 3798. "When Fortune Turns Her Wheel"
- 3799. "Donald Blue"
- 3800. "The Guise O' Tough"

=== 3801 to 3900 ===
- 3801. "Caledonia", "Jean and Caledonia"
- 3802. "The Battle of Alford"
- 3803. "Queer Folks in the Shaws"
- 3804. "The Thurso Fishing Boat Disaster"
- 3805. "The Last Voyage of the Veteran"
- 3806. "The Loss of the Cospatrick"
- 3807. "The Shoemaker's Kiss"
- 3808. "The Highland Laddie"
- 3809. "Highland Harry"
- 3810. "The Middlesex Flora"
- 3811. "Grace Darling"
- 3812. "Flowers of the Forest"
- 3813. "The Banks of Inverness"
- 3814. "The Banks of Dee"
- 3815. "William and Jane"
- 3816. "Skerry's Blue-Eyed Jane"
- 3817. "Early Early"
- 3818. "The Green Banks of Banna"
- 3819. "Down in My Sally's Garden"
- 3820. "My True Love's Gone A-Sailing"
- 3821. "On the Banks of Sweet Loch Rae"
- 3822. "The Atlantic Steamship"
- 3823. "Three Men Lay On a Battlefield"
- 3824. "The Silver Herrings"
- 3825. "My Charming Sally Ann"
- 3826. "Terrence's Farewell"
- 3827. "Pat McCarthy"
- 3828. "Barney Blake"
- 3829. "Father O'Flynn"
- 3830. "Down By Yon Shady Harbour"
- 3831. "Have You Seen Maggie Riley"
- 3832. "The Black Bottle"
- 3833. "Two Lovers' Conversation"
- 3834. "The Rosy Banks So Green"
- 3835. "Little Minnie"
- 3836. "A Bold Young Sailor in London City"
- 3837. "The Ocean Bee"
- 3838. "Maggie Howie"
- 3839. "The Wreck of the Asia"
- 3840. "The Loss of the Antelope"
- 3841. "The Maggie Hunter"
- 3842. "The Wreck of the Belle Sheridan"
- 3843. "The Loss of the John Harvey"
- 3844. "Bonnie Lass O' Bekka Hill", "The Douglas"
- 3845. "The Plains of Waterloo"
- 3846. "On the Banks of the Don"
- 3847. "The Banks of the Dee"
- 3848. "The Soldier's Death"
- 3849. "The Great India War"
- 3850. "The Mason's Daughter"
- 3851. [changed number entry]
- 3852. "Fair Rosalind"
- 3853. "Lady Isabella's Tragedy"
- 3854. "The Unfortunate Grazier's Daughter"
- 3855. "Clerk Saunders" (Child 69)
- 3856. "Jock the Leg and the Merry Merchant" (Child 282)
- 3857. "The Maulster's Daughter of Marlborough", "The Longing Maid"
- 3858. "The Banks of Invermay"
- 3859. "The Teem Wa's", "Neighbour Hark"
- 3860. "Hey Bonnie Laddie", "Mount and Go"
- 3861. "The Parks of Keltie"
- 3862. "Bonnie Belleen"
- 3863. "There Was an Old Man Was Smoking His Pipe"
- 3864. "Black Joke"
- 3865. "As I Was A-Walking By Yon Green Garden"
- 3866. "Johnny Miller of Glenlee"
- 3867. "King Henry" (Child 32)
- 3868. "Young Doctor Stafford"
- 3869. "He's a Dark Man"
- 3870. "The Bonny Blue-Eyed Lassie"
- 3871. "The Lass O' Gowrie"
- 3872. "Mother Bunch", "Andrew Carr"
- 3873. "The Faughhill Shearing"
- 3874. "The Braes O' Killiecrankie"
- 3875. "Young Peggy" (Child 298)
- 3876. "The Laird of Wairston" (Child 194)
- 3777. "Lord Henry and Lady Ellenore"
- 3878. "The Queen of Scotland" (Child 301)
- 3879. "The Earl of Mar's Daughter" (Child 270)
- 3880. "Earl Crawford" (Child 229)
- 3881. "Charlie MacPherson" (Child 234)
- 3882. "Brown Robyn's Confession" (Child 57)
- 3883. "Child Owlet" (Child 291)
- 3884. "Lady Isabel" (Child 261)
- 3885. "Bonny Bee Hom" (Child 92)
- 3886. "The Holy Nunnery" (Child 303)
- 3887. "The New-Slain Knight" (Child 263)
- 3888. "The White Fisher" (Child 264)
- 3889. "The Knight's Ghost" (Child 265)
- 3890. "Thomas o Yonderdale" (Child 253)
- 3891. "Miss Gordon of Gight"
- 3892. [no record]
- 3893. "Auld Scour Abeen"
- 3894. "The Wee Bridalie"
- 3895. "The Little Man"
- 3896. "The Guise of Tyrie"
- 3897. "The Fause Lover"
- 3898. "Our John is Dowing"
- 3899. "Bonny Saint John"
- 3900. "Robin Redbreast"

=== 3901 to 4000 ===
- 3901. "Richard's Mary"
- 3902. "The Clerk's Twa Sons O Owsenford" (Child 72)
- 3903. "The Paddo", "The Maid and Fairy"
- 3904. "Blancheflour and Jollyflorice" (Child 300)
- 3905. "Willie and Fair Burd Ann"
- 3906. "Proud Maitland"
- 3907. "Barbara Blair"
- 3908. "Bonny John Seton" (Child 198)
- 3909. "Lord Livingstone" (Child 262)
- 3910. "Willie and the Earl Richard's Daughter" (Child 102)
- 3911. "Young Benjie" (Child 86)
- 3912. "Kemp Owyne" (Child 34)
- 3913. "The Old Miser"
- 3914. "Young Ronald" (Child 304)
- 3915. "Auld Matrons" (Child 249)
- 3916. "Chil Ether"
- 3917. "The Lady's Gown"
- 3918. "James Grant" (Child 197)
- 3919. "The Virginian Maid's Lament"
- 3920. "Hynd Hasting"
- 3921. "The Haughs O' Yarrow"
- 3922. "Captain Johnstoun's Last Farewell"
- 3923. "The Lass O' Glencoe", "Portmore"
- 3924. "The Laird O' Meldrum and Peggy Douglas"
- 3925. "Walter Lesly" (Child 296)
- 3926. "The Abashed Knight"
- 3927. "The Miller's Son"
- 3928. "Dugall Quin" (Child 294)
- 3929. "The Baron Turned Ploughman"
- 3930. "Geordie Downie"
- 3931. "The Bonny Lass of Anglesey" (Child 220)
- 3932. "Jock and Tam Gordon"
- 3933. "Nathaniel Gordon"
- 3934. "Giein' the Nowt Their Fother", "The Laird of Southland's Courtship"
- 3935. "Young Bearwell" (Child 302)
- 3936. "Guid Nicht An' Joy Be Wi' You A'"
- 3937. "John Bruce O' the Forenet"
- 3938. "Grinding Song"
- 3939. "The Milking Song"
- 3940. "Lescraigie", "Peggy"
- 3941. "Darahill"
- 3942. "The Howes O' King Edward"
- 3943. "Jock O' Rynie", "The Praise O' Huntley"
- 3944. "The High Rocks O' Pennan"
- 3945. "Bonnie Jeanie Shaw"
- 3946. "The Town O' Arbroath"
- 3947. "Kelvin's Purling Stream"
- 3948. "To Roll Her in My Plaidie"
- 3949. "Peggy O' Greenlaw"
- 3950. "The Gallant Shoemaker"
- 3951. "There Cam' a Laddie Frae the North"
- 3952. "Jamie and Jeanie"
- 3953. [changed number entry]
- 3954. "Alford Vale"
- 3955. "Robin Hood and the Bishop" (Child 143)
- 3956. "Robin Hood and the Newly Revived" (Child 128)
- 3957. "Robin Hood Rescuing Will Stutly" (Child 141)
- 3958. "The Noble Fisherman", "Robin Hood's Preferment" (Child 148)
- 3959. "The West Country Damosel's Complaint" (Child 292)
- 3960. "Sheath and Knife" (Child 16)
- 3961. "The Boy and the Mantle" (Child 29)
- 3962. "Burd Ellen and Young Tamlane" (Child 28)
- 3963. "St. Stephen and Herod" (Child 22)
- 3964. "Judas" (Child 23)
- 3965. "King Arthur and King Cornwall" (Child 30)
- 3966. "The Marriage of Sir Gawain" (Child 31)
- 3967. "King Henry" (Child 32)
- 3968. "The Laily Worm and the Machrel of the Sea" (Child 36)
- 3969. "Sir Aldingar" (Child 59)
- 3970. "King Estmere" (Child 60)
- 3971. "Old Robin of Portingale" (Child 80)
- 3972. "The Bonny Birdy" (Child 82)
- 3973. "Will Stewart and John" (Child 107)
- 3974. "Christopher White" (Child 108)
- 3975. "Crow and Pie" (Child 111)
- 3976. "Robyn and Gandeleyn" (Child 115)
- 3977. "Robin Hood and Guy of Gisborne" (Child 118)
- 3978. "Robin Hood and the Monk" (Child 119)
- 3979. "Robin Hood and the Potter" (Child 121)
- 3980. "Robin Hood and the Butcher" (Child 122)
- 3981. "The Jolly Pinder of Wakefield" (Child 124)
- 3982. "Robin Hood and the Tinker" (Child 127)
- 3983. "Robin Hood and the Prince of Aragon" (Child 129)
- 3984. "Robin Hood and the Scotchman" (Child 130)
- 3985. "Robin Hood and the Shepherd" (Child 135)
- 3986. "Robin Hood's Delight" (Child 136)
- 3987. "Robin Hood and the Pedlars" (Child 137)
- 3988. "Little John A Begging" (Child 142)
- 3989. "Robin Hood's Chase" (Child 146)
- 3990. "Robin Hood's Golden Prize" (Child 147)
- 3991. "Robin Hood's Birth, Breeding, Valor and Marriage" (Child 149)
- 3992. "Robin Hood and Maid Marian" (Child 150)
- 3993. "The King's Disguise, and Friendship with Robin Hood" (Child 151)
- 3994. "Robin Hood and the Golden Arrow" (Child 152)
- 3995. "Robin Hood and the Valiant Knight" (Child 153)
- 3996. "A True Tale of Robin Hood" (Child 154)
- 3997. "Hugh Spencer's Feats in France" (Child 158)
- 3998. "Durham Ford" (Child 159)
- 3999. "The Knight of Liddesdale" (Child 160)
- 4000. "Sir John Butler" (Child 165)

=== 4001 to 4100 ===
- 4001. "The Rose of England" (Child 166)
- 4002. "Thomas Cromwell" (Child 171)
- 4003. "Musselburgh Field" (Child 172)
- 4004. "Earl Bothwell" (Child 174)
- 4005. "The Rising of the North" (Child 175)
- 4006. "Northumberland Betrayed By Douglas" (Child 176)
- 4007. "The Earl of Westmoreland" (Child 177)
- 4008. "Rookhope Ryde" (Child 179)
- 4009. "King James and Brown" (Child 180)
- 4010. "Willie MacIntosh" (Child 183)
- 4011. "The Lads of Wamphray" (Child 184)
- 4012. "Dick o the Cow" (Child 185)
- 4013. "Kinmont Willie" (Child 186)
- 4014. "Hobie Noble" (Child 189)
- 4015. "Lord Maxwell's Last Goodnight" (Child 195)
- 4016. "The Battle of Philiphaugh" (Child 202)
- 4017. "The Baron of Brackley" (Child 203)
- 4018. "Loudon Hill" (Child 205)
- 4019. "The Lady of Arngosk" (Child 224)
- 4020. "The Slaughter of the Laird of Mellerstain" (Child 230)
- 4021. "The Coble o Cargill" (Child 242)
- 4022. "James Hatley" (Child 244)
- 4023. "Lady Elspat" (Child 247)
- 4024. "Lord Thomas Stuart" (Child 259)
- 4025. "Earl Rothes" (Child 297)
- 4026. "Lovewell's Fight"
- 4027. "Braddock's Defeat"
- 4028. "On the Eighth Day of November"
- 4029. "The Battle of Point Pleasant"
- 4030. "The Battle of Bridgewater"
- 4031. "The Sir Robert Peel"
- 4032. "Battle of Prairie Grove"
- 4033. "Andersonville Prison"
- 4034. No record
- 4035. "Mustang Gray"
- 4036. "John Garner's Trail Herd"
- 4037. "The Crooked Trail to Holbrook"
- 4038. "George Britton"
- 4039. "On the Trail to Idaho"
- 4040. "When I Was a Brave Cowboy"
- 4041. "The Llano Estacado"
- 4042. "Brown-Eyed Lee"
- 4043. "The Goldurn Wheel"
- 4044. "Windy Bill"
- 4045. "Annie Bree"
- 4046. "The Killer", "Dobie Bill"
- 4047. "Only a Cowboy"
- 4048. "The Bull Fight on the San Pedro"
- 4049. "Little Joe the Wrangler's Sister Nell"
- 4050. "To West Awhie to Say"
- 4051. "The Invasion Song"
- 4052. "The Broken Wedding Ring"
- 4053. "Les Reeder"
- 4054. "Chance McGear"
- 4055. "A Horse Teamster"
- 4056. "Shanty Teamster's Marsellaise"
- 4057. "'Twas on the Napanee"
- 4058. "The Kid"
- 4059. Frank Farrow
- 4060. "The Fatal Oak"
- 4061. "John Ladner" (Laws dC40)
- 4062. "John Robertson" (Laws dC41)
- 4063. "The Man from Conner's Crew" (Laws dC42)
- 4064. "Come All You Jack-Pine Savages" (Laws dC43)
- 4065. "When O'Connor Drew His Pay" (Laws dC44)
- 4066. "The Cook and the Teamster" (Laws dC45)
- 4067. "The Burning of Henry K. Robinson's Camp" (Laws dC46)
- 4068. "Drive on Sandy Stream" (Laws dC47)
- 4069. "Paul Bunyan's Big Ox" (Laws dC48)
- 4070. "Joe Thomas" (Laws dC49)
- 4071. "The Shanty Boy's Ill Fate" (Laws dC50)
- 4072. "The Dying Hoopmaker" (Laws dC51)
- 4073. "Young Forbest" (Laws dC52)
- 4074. "Tomah Stream" (Laws dC53)
- 4075. "Dixey Bull" (Laws dD29)
- 4076. "The Death of Captain Friend" (Laws dD30)
- 4077. "The Loss of the Sarah" (Laws dD31)
- 4078. [no record]
- 4079. "The Spanish Captain" (Laws dD33)
- 4080. "The Greenland Disaster" (Laws dD34)
- 4081. [no record]
- 4082. "The Loss of the Druid" (Laws dD37)
- 4083. "The Lost Boys of East Bay" (Laws dD38)
- 4084. "Sally Greer", "Nellie Greer" (Laws dD39)
- 4085. "The Schooner Kandahar" (Laws dD42)
- 4086. "Corbitt's Barkentine" (Laws dD43)
- 4087. "The Donzella and the Ceylon" (Laws dD44)
- 4088. [no record]
- 4089. [no record]
- 4090. "The Doom of Campbell, Kelly, and Doyle" (Laws dE29)
- 4091. "Hugh McGeehan" (Laws dE30)
- 4092. "Michael J. Doyle" (Laws dE31)
- 4093. "Thomas Duffy" (Laws dE32)
- 4094. "Quantrell" (Laws dE33)
- 4095. "Harrison Town" (Laws dE34)
- 4096. "Moonlight and Skies" (Laws dE35)
- 4097. "Cotton the Kid" (Laws dE37)
- 4098. "Story of George Mann" (Laws dE38)
- 4099. "The story of Gustav Ohr" (Laws dE39)
- 4100. "James Munk's Confession", "Come All You Good People" (Laws dE40)

=== 4101 to 4200 ===
- 4101. "The Tennessee Killer" (Laws dE41)
- 4102. "Talt Hall" (Laws dE42)
- 4103. "The Dying Desperado" (Laws dE46)
- 4104. "Bury Me Out on the Prairie", "I've Got No Use For Women" (Laws dE47)
- 4105. "Harry Orchard"
- 4106. "The Fate of Edward Hickman" (Laws dE49)
- 4107. "The Old Rock Jail Behind the Iron Gate" (Laws dE50)
- 4108. No record
- 4109. No record
- 4110. "The Murder of Colonel Sharp" (Laws dF38)
- 4111. "Polly Williams" (Laws dF39)
- 4112. "The Murder of Mrs. Broughton" (Laws dF30)
- 4113. No record
- 4114. "Gladys Kincaid" (Laws F41)
- 4115. "The Janie Sharp Ballet" (Laws dF43)
- 4116. "Maria Bewell" (Laws dF44)
- 4117. "Nell Cropsey" (Laws dF45)
- 4118. No record
- 4119. "The Murder of Charley Stacey" (Laws dF47)
- 4120. "William Baker" (Laws dF48)
- 4121. No record
- 4122. "John Ferguson" (Laws dF52)
- 4123. "The Murder of Lottie Yates" (Laws dF53)
- 4124. "Jesse Adams" (Laws dF54)
- 4125. "Elk River Boys" (Laws dF55)
- 4126. "The Murder of Marian Parker" (Laws dF56)
- 4127. "Little Marion Parker" (Laws dF57)
- 4128. "The Hennessy Murder" (Laws dF58)
- 4129. "The Millman Song" (Laws dF60)
- 4130. "Arch and Gordon" (Laws dF61)
- 4131. "The Death of Samuel Adams" (Laws dF62)
- 4132. No record
- 4133. No record
- 4134. "Martha Dexter" (Laws dG34)
- 4135. No record
- 4136. "The Hartford Wreck" (Laws dG36)
- 4137. "The Brush Creek Wreck" (Laws dG37)
- 4138. No record
- 4139. "The Bicera" (Laws dG39)
- 4140. "The Mines of Locust Dale" (Laws dG40)
- 4141. "The Wreck on the Somerset Road" (Laws dG41)
- 4142. "The Mcdonald Family"
- 4143. No record
- 4144. "Lee Bible" (Laws dG46)
- 4145. "West Palm Beach Storm" (Laws dG47)
- 4146. "Aaron Hart" (Laws dG48)
- 4147. "Only a Brakeman" (Laws dG49)
- 4148. No record
- 4149. "The Wreck of the Royal Palm" (Laws G51)
- 4150. "The Wreck of the Shenandoah" (Laws dG52)
- 4151. "Fire Tragedy" (Laws dG53)
- 4152. No record
- 4153. "Chankapin" (Laws dH33)
- 4154. "The Bear Hunters of 1836" (Laws dH34)
- 4155. "The Hog-Thorny Bear" (Laws dH35)
- 4156. "Bill Hopkins' Colt" (Laws dH36)
- 4157. "The Champion of Moose Hill" (Laws dH37)
- 4158. "Jim Clancy" (Laws dH38)
- 4159. No record
- 4160. "Old Joe" (Laws dH41)
- 4161. "I Was Sixteen Years of Age" (Laws dH42)
- 4162. "The Iron Mountain Baby" (Laws dH43)
- 4163. "As I Went Out For a Ramble" (Laws dH44)
- 4164. "Young Billy Crane" (Laws dH46)
- 4165. "Perigoo's House" (Laws dH48)
- 4166. "The Messenger Song" (Laws dH49)
- 4167. "Rufus's Mare" (Laws dH50)
- 4168. "Laura Belle" (Laws dH53)
- 4169. "Bugger Burns" (Laws dI21)
- 4170. No record
- 4171. No record
- 4172. "De Titanic" (Laws dI26)
- 4173. "God Moves on the Water" (Laws dI27)
- 4174. "Miami Hairikin" (Laws dI28)
- 4175. "Ella Speed" (Laws I6)
- 4176. "Devil Winston" (Laws I7)
- 4177. "Duncan and Brady"
- 4178. "Batson" (Laws I10)
- 4179. "Dupree" (Laws I11)
- 4180. "Poor Lazarus" (Laws I12)
- 4181. "Railroad Bill"
- 4182. "Bully of the Town" (Laws I14)
- 4183. "Stagger Lee"
- 4184. "These Bones Going to Rise Again" (Laws I18)
- 4185. "Staggerlee" (Laws I15)
- 4186. No record
- 4187. "Just a Wee Drop and Doris"
- 4188. No record
- 4189. "The Miners"
- 4190. "Strike the Bell"
- 4191. "John Adkins' Farewell"
- 4192. "Tom Dooley"
- 4193. "I Have No Mother Now"
- 4194. "I Used to Have a Father"
- 4195. "No Change in Me"
- 4196. "Come All Young Men"
- 4197. "I Loved a Lass"
- 4198. No record
- 4199. No record
- 4200. "Big Eyed Rabbit"

=== 4201 to 4300 ===
- 4201. "Sal's Got a Meatskin"
- 4202. "Shout Lula"
- 4203. "King William"
- 4204. "She'll Be Coming 'Round the Mountain"
- 4205. "All My Sins Been Taken Away"
- 4206. [no record]
- 4207. "When You Hear that Whistle Blow"
- 4208. "I Heard the Whistle Blowing"
- 4209. "Shortnin' Bread"
- 4210. "Went Up On the Mountain", "Gonna See My True Love"
- 4211. "Boil Them Cabbage Down"
- 4212. "Little Nellie"
- 4213. "Hebrew Children"
- 4214. "Dear Mother"
- 4215. "Parting Sweetheart"
- 4216. "O Pretty Girls Won't You List and Come"
- 4217. "'Twas a Dream 'Twas a Dream", "Orphan Child"
- 4218. "Beneath the Linden Tree", "I Saw My Gentle Mother"
- 4219. "I'll Sell My Hat I'll Sell My Coat"
- 4220. "I Asked That Girl to Marry Me"
- 4221. "Cod Liver Oil"
- 4222. "My Little Darling Used to Stand"
- 4223. "Willie's on the Dark Blue Sea"
- 4224. "Something Got a Hold of Me"
- 4225. "When the World's on Fire"
- 4226. [no record]
- 4227. "The Wandering Boy"
- 4228. "Wabash Cannonball"
- 4229. [no record]
- 4230. "Amber Tresses"
- 4231. [no record]
- 4232. "The Ship it Went A-Sailing"
- 4233. "Very First Time I Saw My Love"
- 4234. "Turkey Song"
- 4235. "Cluck Old Hen"
- 4236. "Standin' on the Walls of Zion"
- 4237. "Go Read the Third of Matthew"
- 4238. "Old Dan Day"
- 4239. "Bright Eyed Etta Lee"
- 4240. "North Stratford"
- 4241. "The Bulldog Song"
- 4242. "Ballad of Roaring Bet"
- 4243. "Four Cousins"
- 4244. "Bonnie Eloise"
- 4245. "Mama Sent Me to the Spring"
- 4246. "Lorena"
- 4247. "Turkey in the Straw"
- 4248. [no record]
- 4249. "Let Mr. McGuire Sit Down"
- 4250. "The Lovers' Farewell"
- 4251. "Pig in the Parlor", "Rowser"
- 4252. "Ain't I Glad to Be Out in the Wilderness", "Balm of Gilead"
- 4253. "Did You Ever Ever Ever"
- 4254. "The Skonk I Hunt"
- 4255. "The Spinning Wheel"
- 4256. "Kidd and the Bacon"
- 4257. "Get Along Old Mule"
- 4258. "Young Men and Maidens", "The Truth Twice Told"
- 4259. "Allan Water"
- 4260. "Allan Water" (duplicate)
- 4261. "A Tennessee Mountain Work Song"
- 4262. [changed number entry]
- 4263. "Just Before the Battle"
- 4264. "Time Enough Yet"
- 4265. "The Fair Damsel"
- 4266. "The Dying Prisoner"
- 4267. "The Soldier's Dying Wife"
- 4268. "Angel Band"
- 4269. "Daisy Deane"
- 4270. "The Southern Spy"
- 4271. "The Increase of Crime"
- 4272. "Lyda May"
- 4273. "Nelly Was a Lady"
- 4274. "I'll Be a Good Boy"
- 4275. "Cheyenne Boys", "Mississippi Girls"
- 4276. "I'm Working on a Building"
- 4277. "Just After the Battle Mother"
- 4278. "The Soldier's Funeral"
- 4279. "Young Caroline"
- 4280. "The Real McCoy"
- 4281. "Little Bird"
- 4282. "The Black Sheep"
- 4283. [changed number entry]
- 4284. "On Chickamauga's Battlefield", "Shallows Field"
- 4285. "Old Yellow's Dead"
- 4286. "The Drunkard's Wife"
- 4287. "The Widow's Lament"
- 4288. "Bird in the Cage"
- 4289. "In the Shadow of the Pines"
- 4290. "Sunny Tennessee"
- 4291. "The Sailor on the Deep Blue Sea"
- 4292. "The Bullwhacker"
- 4293. "The Faded Coat of Blue"
- 4294. "The Auld Wife Ayont the Fire"
- 4295. "There Gowans are Gay"
- 4296. "The Frowns that She Gave Me"
- 4297. "Come All Ye False Lovers"
- 4298. "William Bluet"
- 4299. "Take This Hammer"
- 4300. "Bad Tom Smith"

=== 4301 to 4400 ===
- 4301. "The Moonshiner"
- 4302. "The Gambler"
- 4303. "Ship Sailing By", "I Once Had a Father"
- 4304. "Who Am Dat A-Walking in De Co'n"
- 4305. "The Broken Down Tramp"
- 4306. "Stern Old Bachelor"
- 4307. "Peter Gray"
- 4308. "Bring Back My Blue-Eyed Boy"
- 4309. "We Shall Rise"
- 4310. "Six Months Ain't Long", "My Last Ole Dollar"
- 4311. [no record]
- 4312. "A Prisoner For Life"
- 4313. "Old Dog Blue"
- 4314. "Sadie Ray"
- 4315. "Little Darling Pal of Mine"
- 4316. "Engine Bells"
- 4317. "Will Ray"
- 4318. [no record]
- 4319. [no record]
- 4320. "Marching Round the Levee"
- 4321. "Abdul Abulbul Amir"
- 4322. "Break the News to Mother"
- 4323. "Billy's Dream"
- 4324. "A Hot Time in the Old Town"
- 4325. "Bill Bailey Won't You Please Come Home"
- 4326. "My Grandfather's Clock" (Henry Clay Work)
- 4327. "Cottage By the Sea"
- 4328. "Over the Left"
- 4329. "You're Nothing More to Me"
- 4330. "To Meet Again"
- 4331. "Why Did You Go?"
- 4332. "Broken-Hearted"
- 4333. "The Maple on the Hill"
- 4334. "Will You Love Me When I'm Old"
- 4335. "The Old Oaken Tree"
- 4336. "Hello Central Give Me Heaven"
- 4337. "Oh What I'd Give For a Mother"
- 4338. "Nobody's Darling"
- 4339. "Put Me In My Little Bed"
- 4340. "Put My Little Shoes Away"
- 4341. "Page From the Scrap-Book of Life"
- 4342. "The Belleville Convent Fire", "The Wynadotte's Farewell Song"
- 4343. "Shawneetown Flood"
- 4344. "The Death of Charlie Burger"
- 4345. "The Old Girl of Cairo Town"
- 4346. "Lorena"
- 4347. "As Welcome as Flowers in May"
- 4348. "The Miller Boy"
- 4349. "You're a Little Too Small"
- 4350. [no record]
- 4351. "The Jolly Shanty Boy"
- 4352. "The Tune the Old Cow Died On"
- 4353. "Her Bright Smile Haunts Me Still"
- 4354. "The Plains of Emu"
- 4355. "The Exile of Erin"
- 4356. "The Boatman"
- 4357. "Rattle on the Stovepipe"
- 4358. "Sandy Point"
- 4359. "The Roving Shantyboy"
- 4360. "The Raftsmen's Song"
- 4361. "Five Times in Camp Number Three"
- 4362. "The Squire Boys"
- 4363. "Hurry Up Harry"
- 4364. "The Homestead on the Farm"
- 4365. "King Henry Has Set Me Free"
- 4366. "Do They Miss Me at Home"
- 4367. "The Curtains of Night", "I'll Remember You Love in My Prayers"
- 4368. "Little Old Sod Shanty"
- 4369. "The New Limit Line"
- 4370. "Anstruther's Camp"
- 4371. "The Union From St. John's"
- 4372. "The Loss of the Ellen Munn"
- 4373. "The Camp at Hoover Lake"
- 4374. "The Lumberman in Town", "When the Shantyboy Comes Down"
- 4375. "Down on the Farm"
- 4376. "Cork Leg"
- 4377. "Uncle Joe"
- 4378. "Rocking the Baby to Sleep", "Tossing the Baby So High"
- 4379. "The Irish Rover"
- 4380. [no record]
- 4381. "Katie's Secret"
- 4382. "Chickadee"
- 4383. "My Jolly Shanty Boy"
- 4384. "Hauling Logs on the Maniwaki"
- 4385. "Hibernia's Lovely Jean"
- 4386. "Building a Slide"
- 4387. "I'm Seventy-Two Today"
- 4388. "My Mary Anne", "I Gave Her Kisses One"
- 4389. "The Soldier's Letter"
- 4390. "Killeavey's Pride"
- 4391. "Tipperary Man's Courtship"
- 4392. "Though Rocks and Hills Do Us Divide"
- 4393. "A Woman's the Joy and the Pride of the Land"
- 4394. "The Hidden Question"
- 4395. "I'll Go Seek for Another"
- 4396. "Green Grow the Rashes O"
- 4397. "Jane McInerney From Cork"
- 4398. "Come Tiddly Wink Someday"
- 4399. "Wanderin'"
- 4400. "For Sixteen Months I Courted Her"

=== 4401 to 4500 ===
- 4401. "Drill Ye Tarriers Drill"
- 4402. "Memories of the Miramichi"
- 4403. "I'm Ruined I'm Ruined Forever"
- 4404. "The Soldier Laddie"
- 4405. "The Loss of the Schooner Susan"
- 4406. "The Southern Cross"
- 4407. "The Loss of the Snorre"
- 4408. "The Loss of the Riseover"
- 4409. "The Prison of Newfoundland"
- 4410. "Petty Harbour Bait Skiff"
- 4411. "My Dear I'm Bound for Canaday"
- 4412. "The Maid of Newfoundland"
- 4413. "The Wreck of the Maggie"
- 4414. "Jerry Ryan"
- 4415. "Huntingdon Shore"
- 4416. "The Hole in the Wall"
- 4417. "The Wreck of the Steamship Florizel"
- 4418. "Fanny's Harbour Bawn"
- 4419. "The Loss of the Danny Goodwin"
- 4420. "Bold Larkin"
- 4421. "Star of Logy Bay"
- 4422. "My Father's Old Sou'wester"
- 4423. "The Master Watch"
- 4424. "The Loss of the Eliza"
- 4425. "The H'emmer Jane"
- 4426. "A Great Big Sea Hove in Long Beach"
- 4427. "Feller from Fortune"
- 4428. "The Dying Soldier"
- 4429. "The Squid Jiggin' Ground"
- 4430. "The Killigrew's Soiree"
- 4431. "Jack Hinks"
- 4432. "I's the B'y", "I'se the B'y"
- 4433. "Alonzo the Brave and His Fair Imogene"
- 4434. "The Banks of Newfoundland"
- 4435. "Bill Wiseman"
- 4436. "Drill Ye Tarriers"
- 4437. "The Rosy Banks of Green"
- 4438. "Mary Ann"
- 4439. "Baa, Baa, Black Sheep"
- 4440. "Will You Miss Me When I'm Gone"
- 4441. "My Sweetheart's a Cowboy"
- 4442. "Git Along Down Town"
- 4443. "Roll the Woodpile Down"
- 4444. "Night Herding Song"
- 4445. "The Married Man"
- 4446. "Great Grandad"
- 4447. "The Green Field and Meadows"
- 4448. "Lines Written on the Death of Anna Ross"
- 4449. "Our Cherries"
- 4450. "To the Young and Proud"
- 4451. "A Voice From the Dead"
- 4452. "Jumbo Was an Elephant"
- 4453. "The Cowboy's Meditation"
- 4454. "Mary Blane"
- 4455. "Over There", "Over Here", "The Flapjacks Tree", "In Kansas", "The Praties They Grow Small"
- 4456. "Shady Grove"
- 4457. "Greenmount Smiling Anne"
- 4458. "One More River", "Wide River to Cross"
- 4459. "Save My Mother's Picture from the Sale", "Don't Sell My Father's Picture"
- 4460. "Rosalie the Prairie Flower"
- 4461. "Dunderbeck"
- 4462. "The Birdies' Ball"
- 4463. "The Teams at Wanapitei", "In Eighteen Hundred and Eighty-Five"
- 4464. "You Can't Keep a Shantyboy Down", "Keeping the Working Man Down"
- 4465. "Old Holly Crab and I"
- 4466. "We Work for Hay and Company"
- 4467. "Trimble's Crew"
- 4468. "Whitney's Camp"
- 4469. "MacDonald's Camp"
- 4470. "A Gallant Ship"
- 4471. "Johnny Went Down in the Bucket"
- 4472. "Life in a Prairie Shack"
- 4473. "The Wreck of the Mary Summers"
- 4474. "Will the Roses Bloom in Heaven"
- 4475. "Two Convicts They Were Seated", "The Convict's Song"
- 4476. "Blue Eyes"
- 4477. "Once I Had a Sweetheart", "Soldier Boy"
- 4478. "False Now"
- 4479. "Poor Thing"
- 4480. "Clara Nolan's Ball"
- 4481. "The Jolly Cowboy"
- 4482. "I'm a Jolly Cowboy"
- 4483. "Song Ballad"
- 4484. "Old Napper"
- 4485. "The Quilting Party"
- 4486. "The Gin Song"
- 4487. "I'm Gonna Make it to My Shanty Ef I Ken"
- 4488. "Goin Out In Your Name"
- 4489. "The Prodigal Son"
- 4490. "Been A-Listening"
- 4491. "Turnip Greens"
- 4492. "Three Grains of Corn"
- 4493. "The Pioneer Preacher"
- 4494. "The Blue Juniata"
- 4495. "Henry Clay"
- 4496. "Going to the Mexican War"
- 4497. "The Gal I Left Behind Me"
- 4498. "A Hungry Confederate"
- 4499. "Civil War Song", "The Soldier's Fare"
- 4500. "The Battle of Vicksburg"

=== 4501 to 4600 ===
- 4501. "Yankee Doodle"
- 4502. "I Would Not Be Alone"
- 4503. "The Yankees are Coming"
- 4504. "The Homespun Dress", "The Southern Girl's Song"
- 4505. "Crows in the Garden"
- 4506. "Needle's Eye"
- 4507. "Sister Phoebe", "The Juniper Tree"
- 4508. "Rally Boys Rally"
- 4509. "Sally Waters", "Little Alexander"
- 4510. "Texas"
- 4511. "Roll Them Simelons"
- 4512. "Lillie Sweet Lillie"
- 4513. "The Poor Little Girls of Ontario"
- 4514. "Between the Forks and Carleton"
- 4515. "The Toronto Volunteers"
- 4516. "Pork, Beans, and Hardtack"
- 4517. "Prince Edward Island Adieu"
- 4518. "Anti-Confederation Song"
- 4519. "An Anti-Fenian Song"
- 4520. "The Free Slave"
- 4521. "Scarborough Settler's Lament"
- 4522. "The Honest Irish Lad"
- 4523. "The Battle of the Windmill"
- 4524. "The Battle of Queenston Heights"
- 4525. "Saskatchewan"
- 4526. "The Railroad Boy"
- 4527. "Klondike", "When the Ice Worms Nest Again"
- 4528. "The Jones Boys"
- 4529. "The Scow on Cowden Shore"
- 4530. "A Noble Fleet of Sealers"
- 4531. "A Fenian Song'
- 4532. no record
- 4533. "Ferryland Sealer"
- 4534. "The Lake of the Caogama"
- 4535. "The Honest Working Man"
- 4536. "Young MacDonald"
- 4537. "When the Ice Worms Nest Again"
- 4538. no record
- 4539. "My Bark Canoe"
- 4540. "Donkey Riding"
- 4541. "Jack Was Every Inch a Sailor"
- 4542. "The Badger Drive"
- 4543. "Old Grandma"
- 4544. "Smokey Mountain Bill"
- 4545. "The Wreck of the Julie Plante"
- 4546. "The Day Columbus Landed Here"
- 4547. no record
- 4548. "Squarin' Up Time"
- 4549. "Miss Bailey"
- 4550. "Land of the Silver Birch"
- 4551. "The Fisher Who Died in His Bed"
- 4552. "The Pedlar and Pack"
- 4553. "I Went to the Market"
- 4554. "The Antis of Plate Cove"
- 4555. "Flunky Jim"
- 4556. "Uncle Sam's Farm"
- 4557. "The Kippawa Stream", "The Roving Lumberman"
- 4558. "Conroy's Camp"
- 4559. "The Haggartys and Young Mulvanny"
- 4560. "The Falling of the Pine"
- 4561. "All Over the Ridges"
- 4562. "Holmes Camp"
- 4563. "I Went to the Woods"
- 4564. "The River Driver"
- 4565. "The Opeongo Line"
- 4566. "Old Adam"
- 4567. "Mary Had a William Goat"
- 4568. "New River Train"
- 4569. "Tying Apples on a Lilac Tree"
- 4570. "There Once Was a Maiden"
- 4571. "Hi Ho Jerum", "Rich Man and Poor Man"
- 4572. "The Ragman and the Bagman"
- 4573. "The Horse Named Napoleon"
- 4574. "Papa's Billie Goat"
- 4575. "Three Pigs"
- 4576. "The Presbyterian Cat"
- 4577. "Once There Was a Little Kitty"
- 4578. "The Whale"
- 4579. "The Lady and the Crocodile"
- 4580. "What Shall We Have for Dinner Mrs. Bond"
- 4581. "Three Craws"
- 4582. "Animal Fair"
- 4583. "The Blanch Frigate"
- 4584. "New Year's Eve Carol"
- 4585. "Greenside Wakes Song"
- 4586. "The Swearing In Song"
- 4587. "As Tom Was A-Walking"
- 4588. "Down to Yapham Town", "The Yorkshire Horse Dealer"
- 4589. "Swaggers"
- 4590. "Farwell to Alva's Woods and Braes"
- 4591. "Tochineal"
- 4592. "The Nabob", "The Silent Time"
- 4593. "Bogieside", "Adieu to Bogieside"
- 4594. "Farwell Tamintoul"
- 4595. "We Part My Love to Meet Nae Mair"
- 4596. "The Trumpet Sounds at Burreldales"
- 4597. "The Exiled Crofter's Lament"
- 4598. "Blythe Mormond Braes"
- 4599. "Pad the Road"
- 4600. "Grigor's Ghost"

=== 4601 to 4700 ===
- 4601. "Never Take the Hindshoe From a Mule"
- 4602. "I Walk the Road Again"
- 4603. "Friends and Neighbors"
- 4604. "Young Man Out West", "Will You Go Out West", "Go Up West"
- 4605. "The Plains of Illonis", "El-A-Noy"
- 4606. "The Newburgh Jail"
- 4607. "When McGuiness Gets A Job" "Last Winter Was A Hard One"
- 4608. "The Resurrection", "Free Salvation"
- 4609. "The Sailor's Hornpipe In Caxon Street"
- 4610. "Unhappy Jerymire", "The Barts of Jeremiah", "Unhappy Jeremiah", "Jeremiah", "Jerrymiah"
- 4611. "Cousin Jack", "Cousin Jack Song"
- 4612. No Record
- 4613. "Simple Little Nancy Brown"
- 4614. "Darkie Sunday School", "Young Folk, Old Folk, Everybody Come", "The Baptist Sunday School", "Bible Tales", "Darkie's Sunday School", "Sunday School", "Bible Stories", "Darky Sunday School", "I'll Tell You Bible Stories", "The Darkie Sunday School", "Mogos Nogos Everybody Come", "The Mormon Sunday School", "Young Folks, Old Folks", "The Darky Sunday School", "The Sunday School"~
- 4615. "Battleship Maine", "On The Shores of Havana", "The Battleship Maine"
- 4616. "The Yankee Man of War", "The British Man of War"
- 4617. "Jack Gardner's Crew"
- 4618. "Gip Along Josey", "The Jaybird", "Jim Along Jo", "Fire On the Mountain", "Jim Along Josie", "Jaybird, Jaybird", "The New Jim Along Josie", "Josie", "Fire I' The Mountains", "Tra La La La La", "Jaybird, Jaybird Sitting On A Limb", "Fire In The Mountains", "Jaybird Sitting On A Hickory Limb", "Jim Along Josey", "Jaybird Sitting On A Swingin' Limb", "A-Joggin' Along", "Fire On The Mountain, Run, Run, Run", "Hi Come Along", "Jim Along Josie", "Jim Along Joe", "My Ole Missus", "Fire In The Mountain", "Git Along Josie", "Hey Git Along Josie", "Hi Jim Along Josie", "Jango Melango Hey", "Jaybird Sat On A Hickory Limb", "Jaybird A-Settin'", "Greasy String", "Sal Let Me Chaw Your Rosin", "Get Along Josie", "Josey", "Injun Puttin' In The Pumpkin Pie",
- 4619. "Peg and Awl"
- 4620. "Not Far From Ballston"
- 4621. "In The Days When I Was Hard Up", "Days When I Was Hard Up", "The Days When I Was Hard Up", "Vagabond", "Hard Up" "I Was Hard Up", "Int He[sic] Days When I Was Hard Up",
- 4622. "The Banks of Miramichi"
- 4623. "The Fayette Brown"
- 4624. "Going Across the Mountain"
- 4625. "I'll Never Get Drunk Anymore", "I'll Never Get Drunk Again", "One Night When I Got Drunk", "As I Go Out On Sunday", "Rye Whiskey",
- 4626. "Trifling Women"
- 4627. "Lily Schull", "Lilie Shaw"
- 4628. "Storms May Rule the Ocean"
- 4629. "Roy Bean", "Judge Roy Bean"
- 4630. "Bob Stanford"
- 4631. "The Old Scout's Lament"
- 4632. "The Texas Cowboy", "I Am A Texas Cowboy", "I'm A Texas Cowboy"
- 4633. "The Buffalo Hunters' Song", "The Buffalo Hunters",
- 4634. "The Cowboys' Christmas Ball"
- 4635. "Experience"
- 4636. "Railroad Corral" (John Mills Hanson)
- 4637. "The Dirty Cook"
- 4638. "The Brannigan Band"
- 4639. "There Was Ham"
- 4640. no record
- 4641. "The Tough Longhorn"
- 4642. "The Eastern Shores of the Rio Grande"
- 4643. "Poor Lonesome Cowboy"
- 4644. "The Skeptic's Daughter"
- 4645. "California Joe"
- 4646. "Letter From Home Sweet Home"
- 4647. "Wal I Swan"
- 4648. "Anything"
- 4649. "Lovana"
- 4650. "My Mother-in-Law"
- 4651. "The Little Lost Child"
- 4652. "Married and Single Life", "Wild Rovers"
- 4653. "The Crying Family", "Imaginary Trouble"
- 4654. "The Calais Disaster"
- 4655. "Kathleen"
- 4656. "Joel Baker"
- 4657. "The Happy Child"
- 4658. no record
- 4659. "The Vermont Farmer's Song"
- 4660. "The Vermont Boys in Gardner"
- 4661. "There Was an Old Woman", "The Old Man's Three Sons"
- 4662. "Corydon and Caroline"
- 4663. "The Damsel's Tragedy", "The Cruel Mother-in-Law"
- 4664. "The Death of Mrs. Lydia Woodburn"
- 4665. "The Young Men's Song"
- 4666. "Lady Washington's Lamentation"
- 4667. "The Laird o' Lauderdale"
- 4668. "Jefferson and Liberty"
- 4669. "Young Strongbow"
- 4670. "The Song of the Vermonters 1799"
- 4671. "The Indian Student"
- 4672. "The Beckwith Tragedy"
- 4673. "Jonathan's Courtship"
- 4674. "Deacon's Daughter"
- 4675. "Old Kingston Jail"
- 4676. "Making My Will"
- 4677. "My Love is So Pretty"
- 4678. "Mulberry Disaster"
- 4679. "Saw Ye My Savior"
- 4680. "Boy Killed By a Falling Tree in Hartford"
- 4681. "Murder of John Dugar"
- 4682. "Christ in the Garden"
- 4683. no record
- 4684. "The Sword of Bunker Hill"
- 4685. "Cap'n Paul"
- 4686. "In the Dense Woods"
- 4687. no record
- 4688. "Cupid Benighted"
- 4689. "Believe Me Dearest Susan"
- 4690. "Baltimore", "Bound for Baltimore", "Up She Goes"
- 4691. "Highland Laddie"
- 4692. "Slav Ho"
- 4693. "John Cherokee"
- 4694. "Walk Along Miss Susianna Brown"
- 4695. "Paddy Doyle"
- 4696. "John Come Tell Us As We Haul Away"
- 4697. "Round the Corner Sally"
- 4698. "Liza Lee"
- 4699. "Sing Sally O"
- 4700. "The Nassau Homeward Bound"

=== 4701 to 4800 ===
- 4701. "Old Billy Riley"
- 4702. "Randy Dandy O"
- 4703. "Mademoiselle from Armentières"
- 4704. "Barnacle Bill"
- 4605. "Old Sailor's Song"
- 4706. "Around Cape Horn"
- 4707. "King Edwards"
- 4708. "Rocks in De Mountains"
- 4709. "I'm Bound Away to Leave You"
- 4710. "Roll, Alabama, Roll"
- 4711. "Run Let the Bullgine Run"
- 4712. "Chillingowullobadorie"
- 4713. "In De Morning"
- 4714. "Lovely Katie-o", "At Twenty-One"
- 4715. "The Slighted Suitor"
- 4716. no record
- 4717. "Gramachree Molly"
- 4718. "Nora Magee"
- 4719. "Castleroe Mill"
- 4720. "The Phoenix of Erin's Isle"
- 4721. "I'm Just a Common Lumberhick"
- 4722. "Cousin Harry"
- 4723. "Tab Scott"
- 4724. "Jack Simpson the Sailor"
- 4725. "The Horton's In"
- 4726. "Jim Porter's Shanty Song"
- 4727. "The Haven of Rest"
- 4728. "Daniel Sullivan" (Laws E22)
- 4729. "Dougherty's Boarding House"
- 4730. "Kingman Mills"
- 4731. "Great Judgment Morning"
- 4732. "Root, Hog, or Die"
- 4733. (repeat listing)
- 4734. (repeat listing)
- 4735. (repeat listing)
- 4736. "Chebungo Trail"
- 4737. "The Alphabet"
- 4738. "Lancashire Lass"
- 4739. "Sailors They Are Such a Sort"
- 4740. "Willie's Courtship"
- 4741. "Squire Curtis"
- 4742. no record
- 4743. "Sheep Shearing"
- 4744. "Be Careful in Choosing a Wife"
- 4745. "Michigania"
- 4746. "Old Settler's Song"
- 4747. "The Regular Army O"
- 4748. "The Handcart Song"
- 4749. "Echo Canyon"
- 4750. "The Ogallally Song"
- 4751. "Away High Up in the Mogliones"
- 4752. "Santa Barbara Earthquake"
- 4753. "Worried Man Blues"
- 4754. "What Was Your Name in the States"
- 4755. "The Lousy Miner"
- 4756. "My Sweetheart's the Mule in the Mines"
- 4757. "Me Johnny Mitchell Man"
- 4758. "Down Down Down"
- 4759. "The Cannonball"
- 4760. "Idaho"
- 4761. "Zack the Mormon Engineer"
- 4762. "Little Red Caboose Behind the Train"
- 4763. "Been on the Cholly So Long"
- 4764. "Brazos River"
- 4765. "The Loss of the New Columbia"
- 4766. "Rolling Home"
- 4767. "The Iron Merrimac"
- 4768. "Phil Sheridan"
- 4769. "The Bonnie Blue Flag"
- 4770. "The Southern Soldier"
- 4771. "Washington the Great"
- 4772. "The Braswell Boys"
- 4773. "Tom Halyard"
- 4774. "Seated One Day in a Beautiful Cafe"
- 4775. "The Dying Cowgirl"
- 4776. "The Cloudburst"
- 4777. "The Vulture of the Alps"
- 4778. "Little Bessie"
- 4779. "The Titanic"
- 4780. "Old Judge Duffy"
- 4781. no record
- 4782. "Everybody Works But Father"
- 4783. "The Stone Outside Dan Murphy's Door"
- 4784. "Red Wing"
- 4785. "The Wedding of Lochlain MacBain"
- 4786. "My Bonny Native Glen"
- 4787. "The Nut Brown Maiden"
- 4788. "The Frugal Maid", "Three Strings to My Bow"
- 4789. "The Faithful Lady"
- 4790. "Cocaine Bill", "Cocaine Bill and Morphine Sue"
- 4791. "Crabbie and Crickie"
- 4792. "Virgin Only Nineteen Years Old"
- 4793. "No One to Welcome Me Home"
- 4794. "Wheel Up My Barrow"
- 4795. no record
- 4796. "The Sash", "The Hat My Father Wore"
- 4797. "Glengarry-i-o"
- 4798. "Artie Campbell"
- 4799. "Unemployment Blues"
- 4800. "The Blarney Stone"

=== 4801 to 4900 ===
- 4801. "Star of the County Down" (Cathal McGarvey)
- 4802. "The Trans-Canada Highway"
- 4803. "The Garden Where the Praties Grow"
- 4804. "Bonnie Sweet Bessie the Maid of Dundee"
- 4805. "Doctor Pritchard"
- 4806. "John Martin Duffy"
- 4807. "The Little Indian Maid"
- 4808. "My Ma Was Born in Texas"
- 4809. "My California Boy"
- 4810. "One Night I Came Home to My Kitty"
- 4811. "Richmond on the James"
- 4812. "The Mac'ss and the O's"
- 4813. [no record]
- 4814. "Mangrum and Mynatt"
- 4815. "Song of the Cove Creek Dam"
- 4816. "Willie Moore"
- 4817. "The Steam Arm"
- 4818. "I Want to Marry"
- 4819. "Johnson's Hotel"
- 4820. "The Land of Mazzore"
- 4821. "Near the Shannon Side"
- 4822. "Little Annie Rooney"
- 4823. "The Precious Saving"
- 4824. "The Longest Name Song", "The Man With Many Names"
- 4825. "The Hobo's Grave"
- 4826. "There Was a Crooked Man"
- 4827. "The Big Ship Sails"
- 4828. "The Ball of Kirriemuir"
- 4829. "Roll Me Over"
- 4830. "Cosher Bailey"
- 4831. "The Wild West Show"
- 4832. "Watermelon Hanging on the Vine"
- 4833. "Johnston's Motor Car"
- 4834. "Sing Again That Sweet Refrain"
- 4835. "Lulu Had a Baby"
- 4836. "Good Ship Venus"
- 4837. "I Used to Work in Chicago"
- 4838. "The Irishman's Shanty"
- 4839. "Charlotte the Harlot"
- 4840. "The Grass that Grows on the Brim"
- 4841. "The Fireship", "Dark and Roving Eye"
- 4842. "Violate Me in Violet Time"
- 4843. "Christopher Columbo"
- 4844. "I'm a Romany Rai"
- 4845. "The Shearing's No' For You"
- 4846. "Kathleen"
- 4847. "The Tarves Rant"
- 4848. "Twa Heids are Better than Ane"
- 4849. "Brady"
- 4850. "Apple Brandy"
- 4851. "Kitty Maury", "As I Walked Out Into Her Hall"
- 4852. "True Blue Bill"
- 4853. "The Crawdad Song"
- 4854. "Never Let the Deal Go Down"
- 4855. "If You Want to Make a Preacher Cuss"
- 4856. "Crying Holy Unto the Lord", "On the Rock Where Moses Stood"
- 4857. "I Married Me a Wife"
- 4858. "Captain Jinks"
- 4859. "After the Ball"
- 4860. "The Letter That Never Came"
- 4861. "We Are Coming Sister Mary"
- 4862. "The Hawthorne Tree"
- 4863. "A Bird in a Gilded Cage"
- 4864. "I Saw Esau Kissing Kate"
- 4865. "The Sorrow of Marriage"
- 4866. "I Am an Old Bachelor", "My Terrible Pain"
- 4867. "I Fight Mit Sigel"
- 4868. "The Arizona Girls and Boys", "A Comical Ditty"
- 4869. "I'm Going to Fight Mit Sigel"
- 4870. "Down Went McGinty"
- 4871. "Uncle Ned"
- 4872. "Corporal Schnapps"
- 4873. "Just As the Sun Went Down"
- 4874. "On Eli's Sunny Hill"
- 4875. "The Newsboy", "The Drunkard"
- 4876. "On a Cold December Night"
- 4877. "Where Did You Get That Hat?"
- 4878. [repeat entry]
- 4879. "Tread on the Tail of Me Coat"
- 4880. "The Newsboy On the Train"
- 4881. "The Blind Boiler Maker"
- 4882. "Up in a Balloon"
- 4883. "Darling Nellie Gray"
- 4884. "Dermot Astore"
- 4885. "The Grumbling Wagoner"
- 4886. "The Hour Before Day"
- 4887. "My Little Octaroon"
- 4888. "The Beautiful Boy"
- 4889. "Willie Lee"
- 4890. "Comin' Back to Kansas"
- 4891. "On the Bed Ground in a Cow Camp"
- 4892. "The Hancock Boys"
- 4893. "Ogalley Song"
- 4894. "The Pretty Girl I Left Behind"
- 4895. "Weaver John"
- 4896. "There's No Place Like Home"
- 4897. "Are You Sleeping Maggie?"
- 4898. "The Kansas Jayhawker"
- 4899. "Beaula Land", "Webfoot Land", "The Kansas Fool"
- 4900. "The Dewey-Berry Song"

=== 4901 to 5000 ===
- 4901. "Old Cumberland Land" "The Cumberland"
- 4902. "Hickman's Boys"
- 4903. "The Raftsman's Song"
- 4904. "The New Market Wreck"
- 4905. "The Bible's True"
- 4906. "The Big Bend Tragedy"
- 4907. "The Arcade Building Moan"
- 4908. "Kirby Cole"
- 4909. "Sillicosis Is Killin' Me"
- 4910. "TVA Song"
- 4911. "She Sleeps Beneath The Norris Dam"
- 4912. "Tragedy of Spring City Tennessee"
- 4913. "Simple Little Nancy Brown"
- 4914. "A Mother's Love Is A Blessing"
- 4915. "She's Mean I Mean"
- 4916. "Just the Same Today"
- 4917. "God Moves in a Windstorm"
- 4918. "Spirit of the Lord Has Fell On Me"
- 4919. "Whoa Larry Whoa"
- 4920. "Ploughboy Down at the Farm"
- 4921. "Long Long Ago"
- 4922. "I am a Traveling Creature" "Mother Hold My Dying Head"
- 4923. "Faded Coat of Blue"
- 4924. "Jack Frost"
- 4925. "The Hand of God on the Wall"
- 4926. "Mister Bartender"
- 4927. "I Hate the Company Bosses"
- 4928. Down in the Valley to Pray
- 4929. "Gee Whiz What They Done to Me"
- 4930. "Why Do You Stand There In The Rain"
- 4931. "Thinking Tonight of an Old Southern Town"
- 4932. "I Love Letters From My Father"
- 4933. "O Death", "Oh Death", "Conversation with Death"
- 4934. "Precious Memories" "Dreadful Memories"
- 4935. "Come Let Us All Go Down" "Come on Friends and Let's Go Down" "Down the Picket Line"
- 4936. "I'm Going to Organize'
- 4937. "Christ Was a Way Worn Traveler"
- 4938. "Loving Nancy"
- 4939. "We're Going to Pump Out Lake Erie"
- 4940. "I'm Just Here To Get My Baby Out of Jail"
- 4941. "I've Only Been Down to the Club"
- 4942. "It Is No Secret"
- 4943. "Rounded Up In Glory"
- 4944. "The Last Great Roundup"
- 4945. "Don't Ya Hear Jerusalem Moan" "Preacher Blues'
- 4946. "Graveyard Blues"
- 4947. "Come Over and See Me Sometime"
- 4948. "He Never Came Back"
- 4949. "Buckskin Joe"
- 4950. "My Life's History"
- 4951. "Big Wicked Bill"
- 4953. "One Night In Cleveland" "The Canal Dance"
- 4954. "Bring On Your Hot Corn" "Green Corn"
- 4955. "Don't Go Ridin' Down That Old Texas Trail"
- 4956. "What You Gonna Name that Pretty Baby"
- 4957. "I Wish I Was a Mole In the Ground"
- 4958. "Going Down the Road Feeling Bad"
- 4959. "Nine Hundred Miles"
- 4960. "Dawsonville Jail"
- 4961. "The Day That I Played Baseball"
- 4962. "I Left Ireland and Mother Because We Were Poor"
- 4963. "A Single Life"
- 4964. "I Cannot Be Your Sweetheart" "Pale Moonlight"
- 4965. " My Pretty Quadroon"
- 4966. "Mollie Darling"
- 4967. "The Preacher and the Bear"
- 4968. "A Farmer's Life for Me"
- 4969. "Don't Stay After Ten"
- 4970. "Church in the Wildwood"
- 4971. "Twenty Froggies Went to School"
- 4974. "Guy Fawkes"
- 4975. "Shamus O'Brien"
- 4976. "Nora O'Neil"
- 4977. "I Want to Be A Cowboy"
- 4978. "In the Summer of Sixty"
- 4979. "Wyoming Song"
- 4980. "Out West"
- 4981. "The Horse Wrangler"
- 4982. "The Kinkaiders"
- 4983. "The Sheriff's Sale"
- 4984. "The Blue and the Gray"
- 4985. "Sweet Bunch of Daises"
- 4986. "A Violet from Mother's Grave"
- 4987. "A Light in the Window"
- 4988. "Wake Nicodemus"
- 4989. "Mary and Martha"
- 4990. "no record"
- 4991. "no record"
- 4992. "no record"
- 4993. "Ten Little Indians" "John Brown Had a Little Indian"
- 4995. "Murfreesboro'
- 4996. "Jimmy Brown the Newsboy"
- 4997. "Answer to Twenty-One Years"
- 4998. "The Vicar of Bray"
- 4999. "Hey My Kitten"
- 5000. "Miss Fogarty's Christmas Cake" "The Trinity Cake" "Faggerty's Cake"

=== 5001 to 5100 ===
- 5001. "Irish Song"
- 5002. "no record"
- 5003. "Gonna Buy Me A Horse and Buggy"
- 5004. "These Corns of Mine"
- 5005. "Share 'Em"
- 5006. "Why Can't I Catch a Beau"
- 5007. "Yonder Comes a Young Man"
- 5008. "Betsy My Darling Girl"
- 5009. "When the Roses Bloom Again for the Bootlegger"
- 5010. "Old Alec Brown"
- 5011. "Big Jim in the Barroom"
- 5012. "Jump, Isabel, Slide Water"
- 5013. "Down in the Diving Bell" "Diving Belles"
- 5014. "Nancy Lee"
- 5015. "The Texas Gambler"
- 5016. "Sunflower Chorus on Micanopy People"
- 5017. "Herlong's Train"
- 5018. "Down in the Harbor of Havana"
- 5019. "I Can Whip the Scoundrel"
- 5020. "Poor Old Slave"
- 5021. "General Patterson"
- 5022. "Revolutionary War Song
- 5023. "Yankee Doodle" "Boston Tea Party"
- 5024. "Now Moses"
- 5025. "Heaven's My Home"
- 5026. "I've a Long Time Heard"
- 5027. "Mary Wore Three Links of Chain"
- 5028. "Soldier of the Cross"
- 5029. "The Old Bee Makes the Honey Comb" "Bees of Paradise"
- 5030. "My Mule"
- 5031. "Turkey Hammock"
- 5032. "Loupy Lou" "Here We Go Loo-By Loo" "Hullabaloo" "Looby Light" "Lubin"
- 5033. "Sugar Lump" "Ladies Rocking"
- 5034. "Old Brass Wagon" "Little Brass Wagon"
- 5035. "no record"
- 5036. "Irish Trot"
- 5037. "no record"
- 5038. "Paw-Paw Peeling" "Paw-Paw Patch" "Pawpaw Land"
- 5039. "Sweet Pinks and Roses"
- 5040. "Did You Ever See a Lassie?"
- 5041. "no record"
- 5042. "Flying Squirrel"
- 5043. "Birdie Birdie"
- 5044. "The ABC Song"
- 5045. "The Old Fox"
- 5046. "The Jolly Irishman"
- 5047. "I Want to Go Back to Georgia"
- 5048. "Ben Butler" "The Yankee Soldier"
- 5049. "Chicken Foot"
- 5050. "As I Went Over Yonders Pond"
- 5051. "Bacon in the Smoke House" "Sugar in the Gourd"
- 5052. "Prettiest Little Girl in the Country"
- 5053. "Long Sought Home" "Jerusalem, My Happy Home" "Ring Jerusalem"
- 5054. "The Sweet Trinity"
- 5055. "Brethren We Have Met to Workship" "Holy Manna'
- 5056. "no record"
- 5057. "Come and Jine"
- 5058. "Minister's Farewell"
- 5059. "Gwine Tell-A My Lord, Daniel"
- 5060. "When I Was a Rich Man"
- 5061. "Beautiful Bill"
- 5062. "The Farmer is the Man That Feed Them All"
- 5063. "The Cat Came Back"
- 5064. "The Tune the Old Cow Died On"
- 5065. "Whistling Rufus"
- 5066. "The Child of the Railroad Engineer" "The Engineer's Child" "The Sick Child" "Red or Green" "The Red and Green Lights"
- 5067. "Geordie's Courtship" "I Would Rather A Garret" "Plooman Geordie" Geordie and Miss Tiptoe"
- 5068. "The Maid and the Squire"
- 5069. "The Birken Tree"
- 5070. "The Birks of Aberfeldy"
- 5071. "no record"
- 5072. "Learn to Drive a Car"
- 5073. "My Name is Bold Frank McHugh" "Bold Frank McHugh"
- 5074. "The Cow That Went Astray" "The Oul Cow"
- 5075. "Wonderful Duck" "The Duck from Drummuck" "The Wee Duck"
- 5076. "Wild or Tame"
- 5077. "The Newtownberry Carman" "The Carman and the Highwayman"
- 5078. "The Drowning of the Boat"
- 5079. "My Little Fiddle" "The Fiddle"
- 5080. "Bonny Wee Charlie"
- 5081. "Three Bunches of Black Ribbons"
- 5082. "You Boys of the City"
- 5083. "Lovely Anne"
- 5084. "I'll Sing You A Song"
- 5085. "The Wild Irishman in London" "Mick Dolan" "Erin Go Brath"
- 5086. "He's Waited Long for Me"
- 5087. "The Hills of Glen Swilly" "Glenswilly" "Glen O'Lee" "The Hills of Glensuili"
- 5088. "The Banks of Newfoundland"
- 5089. "What Wondrous Love Is This" "Wonderous Love"
- 5090. "The Texas Cowboy"
- 5091. "Shanty Teamster's Marseillaise"
- 5092. "Make Me a Cowboy Again For a Day" "Moving Picture Cowboy" "Backward Turn Backward"
- 5093. "no record"
- 5094. "An Old Prohibition Song"
- 5095. "The Wyoming Nester"
- 5096. "The Santa Fe Trail" "Along Side the Old Santa Fe Trail"
- 5097. "Billy the Kid"
- 5098. "Punchin' the Dough"
- 5099. "My Gal on the Rio Grande"
- 5100. "By the Silvery Rio Grande"

=== 5101 to 5200 ===
- 5101. "The Cattleman's Prayer" "The Cowman's Prayer'
- 5102. "The Cowboy"
- 5103. "The Hell-Bound Train"
- 5104. "Hell in Texas" "Someone's Opinion of Arizona"
- 5105. "There Came A Poor Woman From Sandy Row" "A Poor Widow" "The Old Lady Of Botany Bay" "There Came an Old Woman"
- 5106. "The Wee Faloorie Man"
- 5107. "My Gallant Brave Militiaman"
- 5108. "no record"
- 5109. "I Once had A Granny"
- 5110. "Oh Go Ye In By Yonder Town"
- 5111. "Wedding of Bean Rock Hollow"
- 5112. "The Clerks Of Parch's Cove"
- 5113. "I'm Going To The West" "Going West"
- 5114. "Golden Chain"
- 5115. "When the Parley Dew is Faded"
- 5116. "Jolly Neighbor"
- 5117. "The Smeller Song"
- 5118. "Rag Pat"
- 5119. "When the World's On Fire" "What Ya Gonna Do"
- 5120. "Let That Liar Alone"
- 5121. "There She Stands a Lovely Creature" "Loch Dhui" "Ower Yon Hill There Lives A Lassie"
- 5122. "The Convict's Song"
- 5123. "By Klibreck and Ben Loyal"
- 5124. "The Shepherd's Song"
- 5125. "Piper MacNeil"
- 5126. "The Kielder Hunt"
- 5127. "The Lads That Was Reared Among Heather"
- 5128. "Herd Laddie O The Glen"
- 5129. "The Bonnie Wee Tramping Lass"
- 5130. "Jock Gheddes and the Soo"
- 5131. "The Lassie Gathering Nuts"
- 5132. "A Dainty Ducke"
- 5133. "Up and Awa Wi The Laverock" "Thee Laverock"
- 5134. "MacCrimmon's Lament" "Round Cuillin's Peak"
- 5135. "A Beggar A Beggar"
- 5136. "Willie's Ghost"
- 5137. "Roy's Wife"
- 5138. "When I Was No but Sweet Sixteen"
- 5139. "Sling Me to Sleep"
- 5140. "The Daft Piper"
- 5141. "Cow With the Iron Tail"
- 5142. "Pittenweem Jo"
- 5143. "You Cana Put it On To Sandy"
- 5144. "Moss of Balloch Fair" "Marna Fair" "The Mussellballagh Fair" "Peter Fair"
- 5145. "King Fareweel"
- 5146. "Hieland Rory"
- 5147. "The Haughs of Cromdale"
- 5148. "The Mains O' Fogieloan"
- 5149. "Bonnie Lassie Will Ye Gang"
- 5150. "The Wondering Shepherd Laddie"
- 5151. "The Plewin Match"
- 5152. "The Shepherd Lad O' Rhynie"
- 5153. "The Lucky Ploughboy"
- 5154. "The Banks of Rosshire"
- 5155. "The Banks and Braes of Dunphail"
- 5156. "The Bonny Lady"
- 5157. "The Motor Car"
- 5158. "A Glorious Wedding" "McGinnis and His Cross-Eyed Pet" "The Wedding McGinnis To His Cross-Eyed Pet"
- 5159. "George Morris"
- 5160. "My Last Farewell to Stirling"
- 5161. "The Straw Man" "Mrs. Greig of Sandlaw"
- 5162. "The Week After the Fair" "Jock and Meg"
- 5163. "John Mitchell"
- 5164. "The Bold Tenant Farmer"
- 5165. "Craigie Hill"
- 5166. "St. Peter's Day Was A-Dawning"
- 5167. "The Gay Oul'Hag"
- 5168. "Lovely Johnny"
- 5169. "no record"
- 5170. "The Cow That Drank the Poteen"
- 5171. "Brockage Brae"
- 5172. "Kate of Ballinamore"
- 5173. "On Yonder Hill There Sits a Hare"
- 5174. "The Blackbird of Avondale"
- 5175."Erin's Lovely Home"
- 5176. "Gosford's Fair Demesne"
- 5177. "Carrickmannon Lake"
- 5178. "The Fisher's Cot" "Banks of Sweet Lough Neagh"
- 5179. "The Worst Girl in the School"
- 5180. "The Black Sheep of the Family"
- 5181. "The Benefit Concert"
- 5182. "I'm a Mortal Unlucky Old Chap"
- 5183. "The Stag-Hunting Ballad"
- 5184. "Babbacombe Lee" "Toll the Bell Sammy O"
- 5185. "Sheelicks"
- 5186. "no record"
- 5187. "The Turfman From Ardee"
- 5189. "The White Rose"
- 5190. "Good Mother Hen"
- 5191. "no record"
- 5192. "The Hunting Song"
- 5193. "Dick Turpin's Ride to York"
- 5194. "The Blacksmith Song"
- 5195. "The Ploughman Is a Happy Soul"
- 5196. "The Little Lamb Went Straying"
- 5197. "Moses Ritoora-Li-Ay"
- 5198. "no record"
- 5199. "All You Paddies Lay Down"
- 5200. "The Hammers of Syradale"

=== 5201 to 5300 ===
- 5201. "no record"
- 5202. "The Captain on the Sea"
- 5203. "The Cycling Champion of Ulster"
- 5204. "Gra Machree"
- 5205. "The Soft Country Chiel"
- 5206. "Riverhead Line"
- 5207. "Teddy O'Neill"
- 5208. "Maggie Murphy's Home"
- 5209. "I'll Forgive But I'll Never Forget"
- 5210. "Whistling at the Plough"
- 5211. "Betsy Bell"
- 5212. "The Bonnie Wee Lassie Fae Gouroch"
- 5213. "The Flower Show"
- 5214. "Will There Be Any Travellers in Heaven"
- 5215. "Can Of Spring Water"
- 5216. "Why don't you love the old love"
- 5217. "The Pride of Kilkee"
- 5218. "The Beautiful Hands of the Priest"
- 5219. "Michael Dwyer"
- 5220. "The Christmas Letter
- 5221. "Mac and Shanahan"
- 5222. "The Rineen Ambush"
- 5223. "Misses Limerick Kerry And Clare"
- 5224. "Emmet's Farewell"
- 5225. "Beautiful Beautiful Ireland"
- 5226. "Farmer Michael Hayes"
- 5227. "Who Is The Lady"
- 5228. "Farewell to Miltown Malbay"
- 5229. "no record"
- 5230. "no record"
- 5231. "My Far Down Cailin Bay"
- 5232. "Loved By A Man"
- 5233. "The Bycicle"
- 5234. "Banna Strand"
- 5235. "The Home I Left Behind"
- 5236. "Miss Green"
- 5237. "The Men of County Clare"
- 5238. "My Bonny Boy In Blue"
- 5239. "no record"
- 5240. "For Ireland I Won't Tell Who Is She"
- 5241. "Evalina The Female Sailor"
- 5242. "The Scolding Wife"
- 5243. "The Old Indian"
- 5244. "Eight Years In Cherry Hill"
- 5245. "Western Courtship"
- 5246. "Mrs. Russell had a bustle"
- 5247. "Shanghai Rooster"
- 5248. "The Old Maid's Song"
- 5249. "Pop Goes the Weasel"
- 5250. "Why Don't The Boys Propose?"
- 5251. "New Shoes"
- 5252. "Second-Hand Clothes"
- 5253. "I bought my coat of a tailor"
- 5254. "Busker's Song"
- 5255. "Katie Lee and Willie Gray"
- 5256. "My wild Irish rose"
- 5257. "Dad's Dinner Pail"
- 5258. "I shust came over from Shermany"
- 5259. "Little birdie in the tree"
- 5260. "Baby's Got A Tooth"
- 5261. "Look me in the eye, Johnny"
- 5262. "The Converted Indian Maid"
- 5263. "Have Courage My Boy to Say No"
- 5264. "The Leprechaun"
- 5265. "My Mother's Prayer"
- 5266. "Pretty Pond Lilies"
- 5267. "A Pallet of Straw"
- 5268. "House of Ill Fame"
- 5269. "The Nonsense Song", H Mi Rinkum
- 5270. "I'll be Level With Her"
- 5271. "When I Took Our Nance to Church"
- 5272. "no record"
- 5273. "Come Back Paddy Reilly
- 5274. "The Leprechaun"
- 5275. "The Half-Door"
- 5276. "no record"
- 5277. "If you ever go over to Ireland"
- 5278. "Here I am Amongst You"
- 5279. "Rody Mccorley"
- 5280. "Dicky Dash"
- 5281. "Lovely Glenshesk"
- 5282. "The Banks of Mourne Strand"
- 5283. "Poor Jim the newsboy"
- 5284. "General Owen Roe"
- 5285. "The Irish Ain't Much"
- 5286. "The Flying Trapeze"
- 5287. "Ta-Ra-Ra Boom-De-Ay"
- 5288. "Ta-Ra-Ra Boom-De-Ay"
- 5289. "Nancy Bell"
- 5290. "The Urris Drowning Tragedy"
- 5291. "no record"
- 5292. "Bloomin' Maid of Galway Town"
- 5293. "Drinking Good Whiskey"
- 5294. "The Devil and Baliff McGlynn"
- 5295. "Heathery Hills"
- 5296. "Dritheairin-O-Mo-Chroidhe"
- 5297. "Wee Paddy Molloy"
- 5298. "I'm No' Comin 'Oot The Noo"
- 5299. "The Happy Old Days That's Away"
- 5300. "The Three Gallant Sons"

=== 5301 to 5400 ===
- 5301. "Cucanandy" "Cucanandy-Nandy" "She Didn't Dance"
- 5302. "The Cappabwee Murder"
- 5303. "Sweet Lisbweemore"
- 5304. "The Darling Sweet Girl of Macroom"
- 5305. "Nice Little Jenny from Ballinasloe"
- 5306. "no record"
- 5307. "If Those Lips Could Only Speak"
- 5308. "Trousers on the Door"
- 5309. "Once To The Line"
- 5310. "Twixt Love and Duty"
- 5311. "November Keady Fair"
- 5312. "The Galtee Farmer" "Enniscorthy Fair" "The Rusty Mare"
- 5313. "Bowton's Yard"
- 5314. "Old Billy Pimple"
- 5315. "It's Nothing to Do With Me"
- 5316. "My Heart is as Light as a Feather" "A Lancashire Lad"
- 5317. "Bugs and Fleas"
- 5318. "The Lawyer and the Cow"
- 5319. "Come Inside You Silly Bugger Come Inside" "The Lunatic Asylum"
- 5320. "Our Fred"
- 5321. "Will You Come to Abyssinia"
- 5322. "The Miler's Daughter"
- 5323. "When the Old Dun Cow Caught Fire"
- 5324. "Ballard Strand"
- 5325. "The Flag of Old England"
- 5326. "The Family Ointment"
- 5327. "Erin's Lovely Lee"
- 5328. "The Gander"
- 5329. "Erin the Green"
- 5330. "The White Seed"
- 5331. "Lovely Annie"
- 5332. "An Buinnean Bui"
- 5333. "The Song of Temptation"
- 5334. "The Glens of Sweet Mayo"
- 5335. "The Bogs of Shanaheever"
- 5336. "There Was a Man He Was mad"
- 5337. "The Nurse Pinched the Baby"
- 5338. "no record"
- 5339. "The Hornet and The Peacock"
- 5340. "Logan's Lament" "Tommy and the Apples"
- 5341. "The Death of Colonel Crafford"
- 5342. "no record"
- 5343. "Ohio"
- 5344. "I'm a Tight Little Irishman"
- 5345. "no record"
- 5346. "Go to Saint Pether"
- 5347. "Barney O'Lean"
- 5348. "The Bunch of Violets"
- 5349. "Ballaghy Fair" "I Went to the Fair at Bonlaghy"
- 5350. "Soulva Bay"
- 5351. "The Cassie Stones" "I'm An Able-Bodied Irish Lad"
- 5352. "You'll Want Me Back One Day"
- 5353. "The Gentleman of the Army" "Paddy Whack of Ballyhack"
- 5354. "no record"
- 5355. "The Animals Come In One By One" "The Old Ark" "Old Noah" "How the Ark Was Filled"
- 5356. "How I Wish I Was Single Again"
- 5357. "When I Was Single"
- 5358. "Two Little Lads"
- 5359. "The Girl With the Stripped Stockings On"
- 5360. "Andy Johnson Darkies He's Your Moses"
- 5361. "The Wealthy Farmer"
- 5362. "The Blessed Zulu War" "Give My Love to Nancy"
- 5363. "Green on the Green"
- 5364. "Jan"
- 5365. "List Our Merry Carol"
- 5366. "no record"
- 5367. "Live Herrings"
- 5368. "Son of Labour"
- 5369. "Young Morgan"
- 5370. "Ellen Brown"
- 5371. "As I Went Out Walking One Morning In May
- 5372. "Bernie Reilly's Song"
- 5373. "Mucking About In the Garden"
- 5374. "Yes I Am Contented"
- 5375. "If You Meet a Vessel In Darkness"
- 5376. "Master and Man"
- 5377. "Studying Economy"
- 5378. "The Volunteer Organist" (William B. Gray and George L. Spaulding)
- 5379. "Two Irish Maltese"
- 5380. "Cocktail Joe"
- 5381. "Golden Kippers"
- 5382. "Goodbye Beer"
- 5383. "Maggie May"
- 5384. "Pass Around the Grog"
- 5385. "Standard Bread"
- 5386. "Banks of the Nile"
- 5387. "Good For Nothing Man"
- 5388. "Oh Where Oh Where"
- 5389. "no record"
- 5390. "In the Bushes At the Bottom of the Garden"
- 5391. "Mary Anne"
- 5392. "no record"
- 5393. "For Me"
- 5394. "The Kiethen Hairst" "Rhubbub" "Our Little Garden Sub-Bub"
- 5395. "no record"
- 5396. "no record"
- 5397. "The Reed Cutter's Daughter"
- 5398. "Butlins"
- 5399. "Father's In the Pig Sty"
- 5400. "The Day the Pub Burned Down"

=== 5401 to 5500 ===
- 5401. "I'm The Boss"
- 5402. "no record"
- 5403. "The Cot in the Corner"
- 5404. "The Back O' Bennachie"
- 5405. "May Morning Dew"
- 5406. "The Boghead Crew"
- 5407. "Cuckoo's Nest" (See also Roud 1506)
- 5408. "The Tinker's Wedding"
- 5409. "The Brave Ploughman Laddie"
- 5410. "You Girls of Equal Station"
- 5411. "Oor Fairm Toon"
- 5412. "Cranberry Song"
- 5413. "The Bold McIntyres"
- 5414. "Reuben Wright and Phoebe Brown"
- 5415. "Summer Has Come"
- 5416. "My Susanna"
- 5417. "Oh Sam"
- 5418. "Jimmy Brown Had a Grey Mare"
- 5419. "A Beau Came A-Courting"
- 5420. "What Shall I Give to Thee?"
- 5421. "A Few More Months"
- 5422. "A West Virginia Farmer"
- 5423. "Dear Old Village Churchyard"
- 5424. "Sinclair's Defeat"
- 5425. "Poor Pilgrim of Sorrow"
- 5426. "When I Set Out For Glory"
- 5427. no record
- 5428. "I Will Arise"
- 5429. "Rock of Ages"
- 5430. "Amazing Grace"
- 5431. no record
- 5432. "Jesus Lover Of My Soul"
- 5433. "The Church's One Foundation"
- 5434. "Go Down Moses"
- 5435. "Swing Low, Sweet Chariot"
- 5436. "It's Me O Lord"
- 5437. "Lord I Want to Be Christian"
- 5438. "Npbody Knows the Trouble I've Seen"
- 5439. "Wade in the Water"
- 5440. "Margaret Gray"
- 5441. no record
- 5442. "The Stratton Mountain Tragedy"
- 5443. no record
- 5444. "Vermont Sugar Maker's Song"
- 5445. "The Hoboes Grand Convetion"
- 5446. no record
- 5447. "Regimental Song"
- 5448. "Tom Twist"
- 5449. "Wadham's Song"
- 5450. "Two Little Kittens"
- 5451. "What the Old Hen Said"
- 5452. "Girls and Boys Come Out to Play"
- 5453. "Up the Street"
- 5454. "West River Railroad"
- 5455. "All Is Well"
- 5456. "The Bright Orange Heroes of Comber"
- 5457. "You Never Miss the Water Til the Well Runs Dry"
- 5458. "The Yankee Retreat"
- 5459. "Bull Run"
- 5460. "War Song"
- 5461. "Old Glory"
- 5462. "Mother Is the Battle Over"
- 5463. "Old Joe Camp"
- 5464. no record
- 5465. "Immortal Washington"
- 5466. no record
- 5467. "The First Banjo"
- 5468. "Jonah and the Whale"
- 5469. "Push Along, Keep Moving"
- 5470. "The Frozen Logger" (James Stevens)
- 5471. "The Logger's Sweetheart"
- 5472. "The Housewife's Lament"
- 5473. "The Drover's Dream"
- 5474. "The Dogs' Meeting"
- 5475. "Ye Sons of Australia"
- 5476. "On the Banks of the Murray"
- 5477. "Little Fishes"
- 5478. "Jim Jones at Botany Bay"
- 5479. "The Convict Maid"
- 5480. "The Ballad of the Catalpa"
- 5481. "The Disheartened Ranger"
- 5482. "Come All Ye Lonesome Cowboys"
- 5483. "The Cowboy Song"
- 5484. "Locked in the Walls of Prison"
- 5485. "The Cassville Prisoner"
- 5486. "The Bald Knobber Song"
- 5487. "I'll Be a Better Boy and Do No More"
- 5488. "The Fate of Harry Young"
- 5489. "They Put Me Up to Kill Him"
- 5490. "McCarthy's Widow"
- 5491. "Put On Your Old Gray Bonnet"
- 5492. "Aunt Dinah's Quilting Party"
- 5493. "Ireland Must Be Heaven For My Mother Came From There"
- 5494. "Pat O'Reilly"
- 5495. "A Little Bit of Heaven", "And They Called it Ireland"
- 5496. "Over the Hills to the Poorhouse"
- 5497. "The Irish Jaunting Car"
- 5498. "Kitty, the Wicklow Girl"
- 5499. "Since James Went on the Stage"
- 5500. "Bernard Riley"

=== 5501 to 5600 ===
- 5501. "McSorley's Twins"
- 5502. "The Californian's Lament" "Gold of California"
- 5503. "no record"
- 5504. "Tibbie Fowler"
- 5505. "The Souters of Selkirk"
- 5506. "The Rock and the Wee Pickle Tow"
- 5507. "For the Sake of Somebody" "My Heart is Sair for Somebody"
- 5508. "The Mautman"
- 5509. "Widow Are Ye Waking"
- 5510. "Charley Is My Darling"
- 5511. "The Humble Beggar"
- 5512. "Comin' Thro' the Rye"
- 5513. "My Wife Has Ta'en The Gee"
- 5514. "Patie's Wadding"
- 5515. "Jocky's Fou and Jenny's Fain"
- 5516. "Such a Parcel of Rogues in a Nation" (Hogg 36)
- 5517. "Ye Jacobites by Name" (Hogg 34) (see also Roud V31021)
- 5518. "Muirland Willie"
- 5519. "When She Cam Ben She Bobbit" "The Laird O'Cockpen"
- 5520. "The Country Lass"
- 5521. "John Come Kiss Me Now" "Come and Kiss Me Robin"
- 5522. "Good Morrow Fair Mistress" "Woe to You Women"
- 5523. "Kind Robin Lo'es Me"
- 5524. "As I Came O'er the Cairney Mount"
- 5525. "no record"
- 5526. "Sir John Malcolm"
- 5527. "O Can Ye Sew Cushions"
- 5528. "Adam Cameron"
- 5529. "False Mallie"
- 5530. "Begone Bonnie Laddie" "The Days Are Awa' That I Hae Seen" "Come Back Bonnie Laddie"
- 5531. "The Bonny Woods of Hatton"
- 5532. "The Flower of France and England O"
- 5533. "no record"
- 5534. "The Belt Wi' Colours Three"
- 5535. "The Beauty of Garmouth"
- 5536. "For A' That and A' That"
- 5537. "It's Braw Sailin' On the Sea'
- 5538. "The Flowers of Fochabers"
- 5539. "Johnny's Got His Jean O"
- 5540. "The Bonnie Mason Laddie"
- 5541. "Peggy in the Morning"
- 5542. "Bogie's Braes"
- 5543. "Caledonia"
- 5544. "Sweet Tayside" "The Ploughman's Bonny Lassie"
- 5545. "Davie An' His Kye Thegither"
- 5546. "Fair Maid of Glasgow Town"
- 5547. "Nellie Douglas"
- 5548. "I Love My (I) (As I Cam' Owre Yon High High Hill)
- 5549. "Pitcaithly's Wells"
- 5550. "The Maid of Don"
- 5551. "Toddlin' But And Toddlin' Ben"
- 5552. "The Pedlar" "The House O'Glenneuk"
- 5553. "This is The Night My Johnnie Set"
- 5554. "Mither, I Maun Hae A Man"
- 5555. "O But I'm Weary"
- 5556. "The Scolding Wife" "The Sporting Bachelors" "The Wicked Wife"
- 5557. "A Guid Guid Wife"
- 5558. "no record"
- 5559. "I'm To Be Marrit In May"
- 5560. "no record"
- 5561. "The King of the Fairies"
- 5562. "Cradle Lullaby"
- 5563. "I'll Cheer Up My Heart"
- 5564. "The Constant Lover"
- 5565. "The North Highlands"
- 5566. "no record"
- 5567. "The Star of Banchory's Lands"
- 5568. "The Monymusk Lads"
- 5569. "The Gloamin' Star at E'en"
- 5570. "Cathie and Me"
- 5571. "I Wonder Wha'll Be My Man"
- 5572. "The Braes O' Broo"
- 5573. "The Mill O'Lour"
- 5574. "The Woods Of Rickarton"
- 5575. "Sowens for Sap"
- 5576. "Mullnabeeny (Mill of Boyndie)"
- 5577. "Auld Luckie of Brunties"
- 5578. "no record"
- 5579. "The Praise of Ploughmen"
- 5580. "Little Benton"
- 5581. "The Plooin' Match"
- 5582. "The Ploughman"
- 5583. "Portnockie Girl"
- 5584. "Oh, Ye've Been False, or, The curse"
- 5585. "Boyndlie's Braes"
- 5586. "Gentle Johnny My Jigalo"
- 5587. "Harrowing Time"
- 5588. "New Mills"
- 5589. "Between Stanehive and Laurencekirk"
- 5590. "Tak It, Man, Tak It"
- 5591. "The Working Chap" "I'm a Workin' Chap"
- 5592. "Cameloun"
- 5593. "The Gallant Shearers"
- 5594. "The Herd Laddie"
- 5595. "The Harvest Home"
- 5596. "The Herd Laddie's Lament"
- 5597. "The Braw Servant Lasses"
- 5598. "When the Day's on the Turn"
- 5599. "A Plooman's Lad for Me" "The Plooman's Bride I'll Be"
- 5600. "Ye're Noo On Bogieside"

=== 5601 to 5700 ===
- 5601. "Watty's Wooing"
- 5602. "Tipperty's Jean"
- 5603. "Jacky Tar with His Trousers On"
- 5604. "no record"
- 5605. "Queen Victoria's Welcome to Deeside"
- 5606. "Last Parting of Burns and Bonnie Jean"
- 5607. "Miss Forbes's Farewell to Banff" "Farewell Ye Fields"
- 5608. "The Wars O'Germanie"
- 5609. "In Low Germanie"
- 5610. "A Wee Drappie O't"
- 5611. "And Sae Will We Yet"
- 5612. "Ilka Blade O' Grass Keps Its Ain Drap O' Dew"
- 5613. "The Below the Banks of Skene"
- 5614. "I Wish My Granny Saw Ye" "Johnny Raw"
- 5615. "The Sports O' Glasgow Green"
- 5616. "Danny Sim's Sow"
- 5617. "Sir John Gordon"
- 5618. "The Gallant Grahams"
- 5619. "The Loch O' The Auds"
- 5620. "Jock Scott"
- 5621. "Charlie Mackie"
- 5622. "My Geordie O My Geordie O"
- 5623. "Janet Jamieson"
- 5624. "The Hireman Chiel"
- 5625. "Maggie Lauder"
- 5626. "Maggie Lauder (Sequel To)"
- 5627. "The Donside Emigrant's Farewell"
- 5628. "Fair Margaret of Craignaratie"
- 5629. "The Burnie"
- 5630. "The Beauty of Buchan"
- 5631. "The Road to Peterhead"
- 5632. "The Hobbies"
- 5633. "Jeannie and Johnnie"
- 5634. "The Den O'Aldbar"
- 5635. "The Milkwhite Lammie"
- 5636. "The Sauchen Tree"
- 5637. "Auld Eddie Ochiltree"
- 5638. "Bonny Paisley"
- 5639. "The Buchan Laddie" "Coortin' Owre Slow"
- 5640. "Burke and Hare"
- 5641. "Uncle John's Fiddle"
- 5642. "My Aunt Jane"
- 5643. "The Auld Maid" "Maidens of Sixty-Three"
- 5644. "The Masons" "The Mason Lads"
- 5645. "Bogie"
- 5646. "The Shepherd on the Hill"
- 5647. "no record"
- 5648. "The Broon Cloak"
- 5649. "The Banks of Sweet Dundee"
- 5650. "The Eclipse"
- 5651. "The Ardlaw Crew"
- 5652. "Ye Needna Come An' Flatter's"
- 5653. "Bannocks O' Barley Meal"
- 5654. "The Drunken Wife O' Gallowa"
- 5655. "John Ochiltree"
- 5656. "The Miller"
- 5657. "Maggie's Tocher"
- 5658. "Tullochgorum"
- 5659. "My Wife's a Wanton Wee Thing"
- 5660. "Jenny's Babee"
- 5661. "The Clothes Horse"
- 5662. "Shift Up a Little Bit Farther"
- 5663. "Spotty Dick"
- 5664. "Maas Simkins"
- 5665. "My Brother's A T.D."
- 5666. "The Horney Crew"
- 5667. "The Shepherd Boy"
- 5668. "Farrell's Hill"
- 5669. "The Kildallon Brown Red"
- 5670. "Dobson's Grove"
- 5671. "Clover Hill"
- 5672. "Rathfriland On the Hill"
- 5673. "The Diamond Green"
- 5674. "The Toney Wine"
- 5675. "The Ducks of Magherlin"
- 5676. "The Nightingale"
- 5677. "Big Lynch the Policeman"
- 5678. "Time to Make the Hay"
- 5679. "Come Awa'"
- 5680. "Join the British Army", "The Lass of Killiecrankie"
- 5681. "The Kildare Rake"
- 5682. "The Tinkerman"
- 5683. "John Magowan"
- 5684. "The Irish Boy", "Bonny Irish Boy" (distinct from Roud 565)
- 5685. "no record"
- 5686. "The Sportin' Henry Pat"
- 5687. "She Lived Beside the Anner"
- 5688. "John Montgomery"
- 5689. "no record"
- 5690. "Sweet Lough Guile"
- 5691. "no record"
- 5692. "The Irthing Water Hounds"
- 5693. "My Johnny"
- 5694. "The Lisburn Lass"
- 5695. "The Orphan Boy"
- 5696. "There's None Like a Mother if ever So Poor" "Ever So Poor"
- 5697. "Long Life to Young Jimmy"
- 5698. "Murder of Mountnesson"
- 5699. "Come All You Merry Sportsmen"
- 5700. "Annie Dear I Am Called Away"

=== 5701 to 5800 ===
- 5701. "I Know Where I'm Going"
- 5702. "Someone in Somerset"
- 5703. "I Be Terribly Shy"
- 5704. "The Shirt Me Father Wore"
- 5705. "Meet An Irishman"
- 5706. "Norah" "Where is My Nora"
- 5707. "Come Come Away"
- 5708. "The Barnyards" "The Sun Is Over the Hiltops"
- 5709. "The Big Ship"
- 5710. "The Chimney Sweeper"
- 5711. "Foreign Lander"
- 5712. "Old Tyler"
- 5713. "Captain Webster"
- 5714. "The Shrew Wife" "Before the Daylight in the Morning" "Dirty Nell"
- 5715. "Johnny, Oh Johnny"
- 5716. "Fathers Now Our Meeting is Over"
- 5717. "The Sun Will Never Go Down"
- 5718. "The Day is Past and Gone"
- 5719. "I'm Going that Way"
- 5720. "Blue-Eyed Girl" "Flying Around My Pretty Little Miss"
- 5721. "The Tobacco Song" "Tobacco Union" "Social Union"
- 5722. "Where the Soul Never Dies"
- 5723. "Darlin' Cory"
- 5724. "The Rolling Store"
- 5725. "The Nowhere Road"
- 5726. "That Bloody War"
- 5727. "no record"
- 5728. "The Horse Traders"
- 5729. "The Blue Ridge Mountains"
- 5730. "The Buachaill Rua"
- 5731. "Sugar Baby"
- 5732. "I'm a Long Time Traveling Away From Home"
- 5733. "Poor Man"
- 5734. "Poor Soldier"
- 5735. "Shulls Mills"
- 5736. "Blackberry Wine"
- 5737. "Satan, Your Kingdom Must Come Down"
- 5738. "Everybody's Got to Be Tried"
- 5739. "no record"
- 5740. "Little White Robe"
- 5741. "Shake Hands with Mother Again"
- 5742. "Little Birdie" "Dark Hollow"
- 5743. "Epiphany / Brightest & Best"
- 5744. "Sweet Rivers of Redeeming Love"
- 5745. "Twilight A -Stealing"
- 5746. "no record"
- 5747. "Turn, Julie-Ann, Turn"
- 5748. "Juba'
- 5749. "Neighbor Girl"
- 5750. "The Old Whiskey Jug"
- 5751. "The Keith and the Hiles Line"
- 5752. "River Drivers' Song"
- 5753. "There is a Land of Pleasure"
- 5754. "Goddess Diana"
- 5755. "The Bachelor's Lament"
- 5756. "The Wells O'Wearie"
- 5757. "Wearie's Well"
- 5758. "South Ythsie"
- 5759. "Donside"
- 5760. "I've Got Rings on My Fingers"
- 5761. "Bumpity Bump"
- 5762. "The Black Tail Range"
- 5763. "Ten Thousand Cattle"
- 5764. "Jim the Roper"
- 5765. "Lone Star Trail"
- 5766. "Walking John"
- 5767. "Jeannie the Flower of Kildare"
- 5768. "The Young Oysterman"
- 5769. "Dick the Jiner"
- 5770. "Annie Dear Good-Bye"
- 5771. "Symon and Janet'
- 5772. "The Adventures of Larry M'Flinn"
- 5773. "Green Upon the Cape"
- 5774. "Hector MacDonald"
- 5775. "Vive La Republican"
- 5776. "Flora MacDonald's Lament"
- 5777. "Lewis Gordon" "Oh Send Me Lewis Gordon Hame"
- 5778. "Culloden Moor" "The Tartan Plaidy" "Prince Charlie"
- 5779. "Culloden Moor"
- 5780. "Culloden Field"
- 5781. "The Sow's Tail to Geordie"
- 5782. "There'll Never Be Peace"
- 5783. "The Massacre of Glencoe"
- 5784. "The Campbell's Are Comin"
- 5785. "The Battle of Roslin"
- 5786. "Give Us A Song" "Songs of the Camp"
- 5787. "The Soldier's Last Letter to His Sweetheart"
- 5788. "The Drums Beat to Order"
- 5789. "Bonny Mally Stewart"
- 5790. "Calder's Braes"
- 5791. "Back Again" "Donald's Safe Come Back Again"
- 5792. "The Gallant Soldier"
- 5793. "The Green Plaid"
- 5794. "The Brisk Young Rover"
- 5795. "The Pewter Tailor"
- 5796. "Colonel Hay"
- 5797. "Noble Huntly"
- 5798. "Here's to the Black Watch" "The Gallant Forty-Twa"
- 5799. "The Tam O'Shanter Hat"
- 5800. "Sea Song"

=== 5801 to 5900 ===
- 5801. "Lady Anne"
- 5802. "Come All Ye Blubber Hunters" "Eelie Bob"
- 5803. "The Whaler's Lamentation"
- 5804. "Lovely Ann"
- 5805. "Poor Old Robinson Crusoe"
- 5806. "The Fishermen Hanged the Monkey"
- 5807. "Bonnie Jeannie Gordon"
- 5808. "The Sailor Laddie"
- 5809. "The Laddie Wi' The Tarry Trews" "The Mill" "A Sailor"
- 5810. "The Tailor and the Sailor"
- 5811. "Jean and Her Sailor Lad"
- 5812. "Come Ashore Jackie Tar" "The Lad That's Far Awa"
- 5813. "The Sailor Bold"
- 5814. "Came Ye O'er Frae France"
- 5815. "Geordie's Wig"
- 5816. "The Bonniest Lad That Ever I Knew"
- 5817. "Welcome Royal Charlie"
- 5818. "The Whigs Are A'rinnin'"
- 5819. "King George IV's Visit to Ediburgh"
- 5820. "The Battle Of Aboukir Bay"
- 5821. "Nelson's Fame and England's Glory"
- 5822. "The Sailor's New Leg" "Pull Boys Merrily" "Oh My Comrades You Must Know"
- 5823. "Bony Lost it Fairly"
- 5824. "Battle of Waterloo"
- 5825. "Scots Soldiers True"
- 5826. "The Russian Bear" "Come A "Ye Buchan Laddies"
- 5827. "Our Brave Scotch Lads"
- 5828. "The Highlander's War-Cry at the Battle of Alma"
- 5829. "Jeannie O'Planteenie"
- 5830. "The Female Soldier"
- 5831. "The Butcher's Daughter"
- 5832. "Donald and His Dog" "Donald's Adventure"
- 5833. "The Greenock Railway"
- 5834. "The Iron Horse"
- 5835. "Jock Tamson's Tripe"
- 5836. "John Lovie'
- 5837. "The Wife O' Gateside"
- 5838. "The Braes of Yarrow"
- 5839. "Yarrow Streams" "Yarrow Vale"
- 5840. "The Lady of Dun"
- 5841. "The Lass O' The Lecht"
- 5842. "The Lasses of Kinghorn" "Kinghorn Ferry"
- 5843. "The Battle of Corriemuchloch"
- 5844. "The Fraserburgh Meal Riot"
- 5845. "The Farmer Candidate"
- 5846. "Stumpie the Lawyer"
- 5847. "Mcallum's Lament" "The Bonnie Woods of Cawdor"
- 5848. "My Dog and I"
- 5849. "John Gunn"
- 5850. "I'm Nae Awa' To Bide Awa'" "I'm Not Going Away" "My Ain Kate"
- 5851. "Robin the Smuggler"
- 5852. "The Proud Pedlar" "The Lady and Poor Pedlar"
- 5853. "The Laird O' Grant"
- 5854. "The Drunken Exciseman" "The Exciseman In a Coal Pit"
- 5855. "The Absent-Minded Man"
- 5856. "Tobacco Plenty"
- 5857. "The Wee Wifikie"
- 5858, "John Highlandman's Remarks on the City of Glasgow"
- 5859. "Paddy's Voyage to Glasgow"
- 5860. "Poor Jock Frae the Country"
- 5861. "Big Kilmarnock Bonnet' "Farmer Broon"
- 5862. "Jock Sheep"
- 5863. "The Jolly Sportsman" "The Sportsboy"
- 5864. "The Miller's She-Ass"
- 5865. "The China Merchant"
- 5866. "Kate's Big Shirt"
- 5867. "The Unfortunate Boot"
- 5868. "The Maskin Rung" "The Holland Green"
- 5869. "Jock Hamilton", "Duke Hamilton", "Lord Hamilton"
- 5870. "The Wee Midgie Meer"
- 5871. "The Legend of Pot Sunk Ann"
- 5872. "The Ghaist O' Fernden"
- 5873. "The Baron of Gartley"
- 5874. "The Warlock Laird O' Skene"
- 5875. "Hooly and Fairly"
- 5876. "The Barley Bree" "The Highland Heather"
- 5877. "The Land O' Cakes"
- 5878. “My Heart is in the Highlands”
- 5879. "Matty Broon's Soo (Tam Gibb and the Soo)"
- 5880. "The Auld Man's Mare's Dead"
- 5881. "The Bonnie Fisher Lass"
- 5882. "My Wheelie Goes Round"
- 5883. "The Bonnie Mason Laddie"
- 5884. "I Wish That You Were Dead Goodman"
- 5885. "The Son of the Seven"
- 5886. "Our Feet's Cauld"
- 5887. "Get Up Goodwife and Shake Your Feathers" "Raise Up Auld Wife" "Go to the Devil and Shake Yourself" "Orkney Hogmanay Song"
- 5888. "The Bonnie Breist-Knots"
- 5889. "The Blythsome Bridal"
- 5890. "The Teetotal Mill"
- 5891. "Watty and Meg"
- 5892. "Come Hame To your Lingels"
- 5893. "Drap O' Capie O"
- 5894. "Tobacco Pipes and Porter"
- 5895. "There Was First Guid Ale"
- 5896. "Glendronach"
- 5897. "The Irish Shore"
- 5898. "Dance Boatman Dance"
- 5899. "The Smith's A Gallant Fireman"
- 5900. "Tired O' Workin' Lyauvie's Braes"

=== 5901 to 6000 ===
- 5901. "Darrahill"
- 5902. "Ellon Market"
- 5903. "The Greedy Gled O' Mains"
- 5904. "Mains O' Elrick"
- 5905. "Reid Hoose"
- 5906. "Benton"
- 5907. "The Benton Crew"
- 5908. "Frae the Martimas Term"
- 5909. "Netherthird"
- 5910. "Netherha'"
- 5911. "This is Halloween" "Hallowe'en Rhyme"
- 5912. "The Glass Market"
- 5913. "Brannan Fair O'Banff"
- 5914. "There Was A Fair"
- 5915. "The Bothy Lads O'Forfar" "Tattie Jock"
- 5916. "Geordie Williamson"
- 5917. "I Left Inverquhomery"
- 5918. "There's a Set O' Farmers here About"
- 5919. "Straloch
- 5920. "On the Sixteenth O' October"
- 5921. "Nethermill"
- 5922. "I've Sair'd Wi'men"
- 5923. "Jamie Broon"
- 5924. "Potterton"
- 5925. "The Mains O' Culsh"
- 5926. "Come A 'Ye Buchan Laddies"
- 5927. "There's Nae Luck at Tullo's Toon"
- 5928. "The Goodman's Song"
- 5929. "The Mains O' Boyndie"
- 5930. "Marafray"
- 5931. "no record"
- 5932. "Likewise We Hae a Hoosemaid"
- 5933. "The Northessie Crew"
- 5934. "The Kiethen Hairst"
- 5935. "My Ploughman Boy"
- 5936. "The Jolly Ploughman Lad"
- 5937. "The Ploughman Chiel and the Ploughman Laddie"
- 5938. "The Laddie That Hauds The Plough"
- 5939. "The Fyvie Ploughmen"
- 5940. "Then Some Wi Pins" "The Ploughing Match"
- 5941. No record.
- 5942. "Ah Smiler Lad"
- 5943. "The Inverquhomery Ploughing Match"
- 5944. "The Dalmuir Ploughing Match"
- 5945. "Ca' Hawkie Through the Water"
- 5946. "Jocky and His Owsen"
- 5947. "Herdie Derdie"
- 5948. "Cowaye"
- 5949. "The Muirland Farmer"
- 5950. "Depression"
- 5951. "The Frostit Corn"
- 5952. "Lord Fife"
- 5953. "A Song of Welcome"
- 5954. "There's Tillydeask"
- 5955. "Sa Up and Rise"
- 5956. "It Wasna Sae"
- 5957. "My Love's A Plooman"
- 5958. "Come All You Jolly Ploughboys"
- 5959. "The Dusty Miller"
- 5960. "Crook and Plaid"
- 5961. "The Buchan Road"
- 5962. "Boyndlie Road"
- 5963. "The Toll Bar"
- 5964. "The Freemason's Song"
- 5965. "John Buchan, Blacksmith"
- 5966. "The Compass and Sqare"
- 5967. "The Rules of Masonry"
- 5968. "The Plumb and Level"
- 5969. "Wi' His Apron On"
- 5970. "Adam in the Garden"
- 5971. "The Spinnin' O't"
- 5972. "The Free Gardener"
- 5973. "O Mither! Ony Body"
- 5974. "My Lovie Was a Shoemaker"
- 5975. "The Cobbler"
- 5976. "The Weaver Lad"
- 5977. "Beggars and Ballad Singers"
- 5978. "The Scavenger's Brigade"
- 5979. "There Lives a Man in Ardes Town"
- 5980. "The Auld Mare's Lament"
- 5981. "Trusty"
- 5982. "Duncan M'Callipin"
- 5983. "Duncan MacKallikin"
- 5984. "John Fox"
- 5985. "The Hare's Lament"
- 5986. "Fin We Gang Up Tae London"
- 5987. "O Janet Bring Me Ben My Sunday Coat"
- 5988. "The Berwick Freeman"
- 5989. "The Hills O' Gallowa'"
- 5990. "The Land of the West"
- 5991. "Hainan's Waal"
- 5992. "The Hill O' Callivar"
- 5993. "Mountblairy"
- 5994. "Monquhitter's Lonely Hill"
- 5995. "The Tarland Laws"
- 5996. "The Bodies O' The Lyne O' Skene"
- 5997. "Oh Cruel"
- 5998. "The Den O' Aldbar"
- 5999. "Peterhead"
- 6000. "The Newburgh Salmon Dinner Song"

=== 6001 to 6100 ===
- 6001. "O Ugie Tho Nae Classic Stream"
- 6002. "Rothiemay"

=== 6101 to 6200 ===
- 6101. "The Wicked Captain"
- 6102. "The Glead"

=== 6201 to 7000 ===
- 6287. "Kate Dalrymple"
- 6294. "Auld Lang Syne"
- 6306. "The Farmer in the Dell"
- 6308. "(Here We Go Gathering) Nuts in May"
- 6319. "Blackwaterside", "Bonny Irish Maid", "Lovely Irish Maid", "Irish Maid"
- 6329. "The Blarney Roses"
- 6363. "Handsome John"
- 6364. "Midnight Special"
- 6381."Old Rattler"
- 6389. "Chicken in the Bread Tray" "Granny Will Your Dog Bite"
- 6393. "The House of the Rising Sun"
- 6423. "Old-Time Religion"
- 6475. "Last Valentine's Day", "Black Sloven"
- 6486. "Pat-a-cake, pat-a-cake, baker's man"
- 6487. "Little Bo Peep"
- 6489. "Hickory Dickory Dock"
- 6547. "'Til Next Market Day"
- 6555. "Ballad of the Erie Canal"
- 6562. "Annan Water" (Child 215 App.)
- 6599. "The Ee-rye-ee Canal"
- 6574. "The False Hearted Lover"
- 6673. "When Johnny Comes Marching Home"
- 6677. "Hop High Ladies the Cake's All Dough" "Hop High Ladies (Uncle Joe)"
- 6678. "Idumea"
- 6695. "The Colorado Trail"
- 6696. "Big Rock Candy Mountain"
- 6701. "John the Revelator"
- 6702. "This Train"
- 6711. "Long John"
- 6739. "The George Aloe and the Sweepstake" (Child 285)
- 6740. "Young Andrew" (Child 48)
- 6858. "Fitba' Crazy", "Football Crazy" (James Curran)
- 6897. "I Am a Youth"
- 6936. "Now Westlin Winds" (Robert Burns)
- 6955. "Will My Soul Pass Through Ireland"
- 6960. "Three Wee Glasgow Molls"

=== 7001 to 8000 ===
- 7024. "Old Jimmy Johnson"
- 7025. "The Great, Highway Wind that Blew The Low Post Down"
- 7026. "Old Man, Old Man' "Old Man Can I Have Your Daughter"
- 7027. "The Train that Carried My Girl From Town"
- 7028. "Old Jawbones"
- 7029. "Battle of Fisher's Hill"
- 7030. "Jay Legg"
- 7043. "Angeline"
- 7046. "Danville Girl"
- 7050. "John Dolan"
- 7051. "Old Phoeba Ice"
- 7052. "Charming Betsy"
- 7053. "Logging On Bear Fork"
- 7054. "Joe and Mary"
- 7055. "On The Cumberland Land"
- 7056. "West Fork Girls"
- 7098. 'You've Got to Walk the Lonesome Valley" "Lonesome Valley"
- 7148. "Hey How My Johnny Lad"
- 7374. "On the Banks of the Old Tennessee"
- 7382. "See That My Grave Is Kept Clean" (Blind Lemon Jefferson)
- 7480. "Columbus Stockade Blues"
- 7444. "Great Speckled Bird"
- 7445. "Whip-Poor-Will"
- 7501. "He's Got the Whole World in His Hands"
- 7508. "Snow Deer"
- 7603. "Ten Green Bottles"
- 7622. "Mary Had a Little Lamb"
- 7627. "Somebody's Stole My Little White Dog" "Way Down in Rackensack"
- 7657. "It Ain't Gonna Rain No Mo'" (Wendell Hall)
- 7666. "Twinkle, Twinkle Little Star"
- 7682. "Drunkard's Hiccoughs"
- 7686. "My Home's Across the Blue Ridge Mountains"
- 7689. "Sitting on Top of the World"
- 7734. "A Wise Old Owl"
- 7882. "Here We Go Round the Mulberry Bush"
- 7883. "Golden Slippers"
- 7841. "When This Old Hat Was New"
- 7899. "Polly Put the Kettle On"
- 7922. "The Muffin Man"
- 7925. "Ring a Ring O'Roses"
- 7989. "Harp Without a Crown", "The Girls of Dublin Town", "The Gals o' Dublin Town"
- 7992. "Hallelujah, I'm a Bum"

=== 8001 to 9000 ===
- 8125. "Welcoming Poor Paddy Home"
- 8136. "Ned of the Hill" (English version of Éamonn an Chnoic) (See also Roud V28517)
- 8147. "The Cow Ate the Piper"
- 8148. "How Many Miles to Babylon?"
- 8179. "Annie Laurie"
- 8187. "The Braes o' Killiecrankie"
- 8194. "Lyke-Wake Dirge"
- 8215. "The Old Turf Fire", "My Little Marble Hall"
- 8231. "Dixie"
- 8234. "All For Me Grog", "Across the Western Ocean"
- 8240. "Pit Lie Idle"
- 8247. "Hi, canny man" (Harry Nelson)
- 8249. "Pit Lie Idle"
- 8276. "False, False"
- 8287. "Bully in the Alley"
- 8293. "Sebastapol"
- 8312. "Farewell to Cotia"
- 8337. "Hark! The Herald Angels Sing"
- 8358. "Angels from the Realms of Glory"
- 8368. "Lydia Pinkham", "The Ballad of Lydia Pinkham", "Lily the Pink"
- 8388. "The Bastard King of England"
- 8399. "The Castlereagh River"
- 8402. "Bless 'Em All" (words: Fred Godfrey, music: Robert Kewley)
- 8460. "Over the Hills and Far Away"
- 8503. "The Country Wedding" "Haste to the Wedding"
- 8513. "Bonnie Dundee" (Walter Scott)
- 8694. "Come Under My Plaidie"
- 8709. "The Broom of Cowdenknowes / How Blythe, Ilk Morn, Was I to See"

=== 9001 to 10,000 ===
- 9134. "I Shall Not Be Moved"
- 9139. "Copshawholme Fair"
- 9164. "We're All Surrounded"
- 9176. "Blackberry Grove"
- 9212. "Black, White, Yellow and Green", "There Was an Old Woman"
- 9234. "Cob Coaling" Song
- 9266. "Down by the Glenside", "The Bold Fenian Men"
- 9305. "Galtee Farmer"
- 9373. "How Do You Do"
- 9375. "I Knew An Old Woman Who Swallowed a Spider"
- 9397. "How Stands the Glass Around"
- 9424. "The Red Light Saloon"
- 9435. "Leaving of Liverpool"
- 9439. "Johnny Come Down the Backstay"
- 9520. "The Jacket Green" (Michael Scanlan)
- 9534. "The Shaver"
- 9536. "Waltzing Matilda" (Banjo Paterson)
- 9564. "My Old Kentucky Home"
- 9579. "Where the River Shannon Flows"
- 9595. "On the Banks of the Wabash, Far Away"
- 9596. "Marching Through Georgia"
- 9598. "The Bonnie Banks o' Loch Lomond"
- 9601. "Old Black Joe", "Poor Old Joe" (Stephen Foster)
- 9611. "Clementine"
- 9612. "The Preacher and the Slave"
- 9614. "Oh! Susanna" (Stephen Foster)
- 9618. "Hanging on the Old Barbed Wire"
- 9621. "She Was Poor but She Was Honest"
- 9633. "Creggan White Hare"
- 9634. "The Rising of the Moon"
- 9695. "On the Banks of the Wabash, Far Away", "The Lonely Woods of Upton"
- 9701. "Oh My Monkey Jacket"
- 9741. "The Three O'Donnells"
- 9742. "The Three Flowers"
- 9753. "Mursheen Durkin"
- 9833. "The Great American Bum"
- 9859. "The Runaway Train"
- 9949. "The Moonshine Can"

=== 10,001 to 11,000 ===
- 10017. "I'm Alabama Bound"
- 10030. "Corrine, Corrina", aka "Sweet Alberta"
- 10050. "Woman Woman I Seen Yo' Man"
- 10051. "You Talk about Your Greenbacks"
- 10052. "Rock About My Saro Jane"
- 10053. "I Wanna Go Home"
- 10054. "Raise a Rukus Tonight"
- 10055. "Shorty George"
- 10056. "See See Rider"
- 10057. "Dink's Song"
- 10058. "Cackling Hen"
- 10059. "Buckeye Jim"
- 10060. "Ox Driver's Song"
- 10061. "Pick a Bale of Cotton"
- 10062. "Take a Whiff On Me" "Take a Drink on Me"
- 10063. "Ain't No More Cane on This Brazos"
- 10064. "Almost Done"
- 10065. "Another Man Done Gone"
- 10066. "The Grey Goose"
- 10067. "Poor Little Jesus"
- 10068. "He Never Said A Mumbling Word"
- 10069. "Soon One Mornin' Death Come Creepin" "Soon One Morning"
- 10070. "Can't You Line 'Em"
- 10071. "Great Gettin' Up Mornin'"
- 10072. "Sometimes I Feel Like a Motherless Child"
- 10074. "Joshua Fit the Battle of Jericho"
- 10075. "Gospel Plow" "Keep Your Hands On That Plow"
- 10082. "Keep On the Sunny Side"
- 10098. "Sweet Sixteen"
- 10124. "Eskimo Nell"
- 10146. "Those Little Red Drawers That Maggie Wore"
- 10232. "My Father's a Lavatory Cleaner"/"Shine Your Buttons with Brasso"
- 10242. "In the Shade of the Old Apple Tree"
- 10259. "Do Your Ears Hang Low?"
- 10263. "I Don't Want to Join the Army"
- 10266. "Jack and Jill"
- 10338. "Pump Away"
- 10391. "They're Moving Father's Grave to Build a Sewer"
- 10433. "Keep Your Lamp Trimmed and Burning"
- 10447. "The Wee Wee Song"
- 10465. "The Chinese Bum-boat Man"
- 10477. "Empty Bed Blues"
- 10493. "Hitler Has Only Got One Ball"
- 10499. "D-Day Dodgers"
- 10508. "Quartermaster's Stores"
- 10513. "Salonika"
- 10516. "The Kriegie Ballad"
- 10517. "The Valley of Jarama" (See also Roud 24111)
- 10523. "Far Far From Ypres", "Mop It Down", "Here's to the Good Old Whisky/Beer", "Drink It Down"
- 10529. "When This Bloody War Is Over", "When This Lousy War Is Over"
- 10531. "Glorious", "Drunk Last Night"
- 10541. "Michael Finnegan"
- 10612. "Henry Joy"
- 10621. "A Land Where We'll Never Grow Old" "Never Grow Old"
- 10678. "The Lord Bless Charlie Mott", "God Bless Charlie Mopps", "Charlie Mopps (the Man Who Invented Beer)"
- 10682. "My Brother Sylvest"
- 10733. "The Old Game Cock", "Every Morning"
- 10764. "The Mountains Of Mourne" (Percy French)

=== 11,001 to 12,000 ===
- 11235. "It's a Long Way to Tipperary"
- 11254. "I'm Bound Away"
- 11257. "The Intoxicated Rat"
- 11284. "One, Two, Buckle My Shoe"
- 11500. "I Ask That Gal"
- 11501. "Bow-Wow and Bo-Wee"
- 11502. "The Garden Hymn"
- 11503. "Jesus Walked in Galilee" "Judas"
- 11504. "Pretty Boy Floyd"
- 11505. "More Pretty Girls Than One"
- 11506. " Hey Lolly Lolly"
- 11507. "The Ranger's Command"
- 11508. "Lonesome Day"
- 11509. "Hard Ain't It Hard"
- 11510. "Poor Boy"
- 11520. "Lost John"
- 11543. "Otto Wood the Bandit"
- 11549. "My Cabin Home"
- 11586. "Itsy Bitsy Spider"
- 11594. "The Little Black Train Is Coming"
- 11616. "Scraping Up Sand in the Bottom of the Sea"
- 11659. "Ain't It a Shame"
- 11661. "Salty Dog"
- 11667. "Backwater Blues"
- 11668. "Black Betty"
- 11681. "Goodnight, Irene"
- 11684. "Grey Goose"
- 11687. "Good Morning Blues"
- 11694. "Meeting at the Building"
- 11726. "Way Down Yonder" "The Alabama Way"
- 11727. "Miss Terrapin and Miss Toad" "As I Went (Down) The New Cut Road"
- 11730. "The Prisoner's Song"
- 11733. "Hand Me Down My Walking Cane"
- 11735. "Foggy Mountain Top"
- 11765. "Hesitation Blues"
- 11768. "Camptown Races"
- 11771. "The Traveling Coon", "Traveling Man"
- 11823. "Mary Don't You Weep"
- 11861. "Jehovah, Hallelujah"
- 11870. "Way Down Below"
- 11886. "Down by the Riverside", "Ain't Gonna Study War No More"
- 11924. "Come By Here", "Kum-by-yah"
- 11938. All My Trials
- 11971. "Do Lord Remember Me"
- 11975. "Michael Row the Boat Ashore"

=== 12,001 to 13,000 ===
- 12149. "Ragged but Right"
- 12153. "Jordan Is a Hard Road to Travel"
- 12442. "Jump Jim Crow"
- 12463. "The Murder of Mary Tuplin"
- 12172. "The Old Ship of Zion"
- 12497. "The Hayseed"
- 12551. "The Devil and the Feathery Wife"
- 12598. "The Monkeys Have No Tails in Zamboanga"
- 12657. "Blackbirds and Thrushes"
- 12675. "The Saucy Arethusa", "The Arethusa"
- 12682. "Early One Morning"
- 12708. "The Rambling Gambler"
- 12764. "Nobody Likes Me", "Guess I'll Eat Some Worms"
- 12783. "Carnival of Venice"
- 12809. "Blest Be the Tie That Binds"
- 12817. "Christmas is Coming"
- 12824. "I Love Little Pussy"
- 12946. "My Love Is Like a Red Red Rose"
- 12983. "Rub-a-dub-dub"

=== 13,001 to 14,000 ===
- 13026. "Humpty Dumpty"
- 13027. "Little Jack Horner"
- 13028. "See Saw Margery Daw"
- 13029. "Hot Cross Buns"
- 13153. "Diamonds In The Rough"
- 13188. "A-Tisket, A-Tasket"
- 13190. "Oranges and Lemons"
- 13191. "Sing a Song of Sixpence"
- 13204. "Green Peas Mutton Pies"
- 13252. "The Rosabella"
- 13268. "Eight Bells"
- 13392. "The Harp that Once Through Tara's Halls" (Thomas Moore)
- 13449. "Home Sweet Home"
- 13497. "Peter Peter Pumpkin Eater"
- 13512. "Ten Little Indians"
- 13530. "One, Two, Three, Four, Five"
- 13589. "Comin' Thro' the Rye" (Robert Burns)
- 13642. "The Shoals of Herring" (Ewan MacColl)
- 13711. "Wee Willie Winkie"
- 13743. "The Road by the River" (Frank O'Donovan)
- 13849. "Bluebells of Scotland"
- 13867. "The Minstrel Boy" (Thomas Moore)
- 13880. "Old Folks At Home" (Swannee River)
- 13889. "The Banks O' Doon"
- 13902. "Jack Be Nimble"
- 13926. "Hard Travelin'"
- 13930. "Make Me a Pallet on the Floor"
- 13941. "O Dem Golden Slippers"
- 13943. "Hook and Line"
- 13968. "Babylon is Fallen"
- 13983. "When the Saints Go Marching In"

=== 14,001 to 15,000 ===
- 14001. "Alec's Lament"
- 14002. "Bachelor's Hall"
- 14003. "Mick Riley"
- 14004. No record
- 14005. "There's Nothing to Be Gained by Roving"
- 14006. "If I Had As Many Wives"
- 14007. "Baby's Ball"
- 14008. "Three Little Mice"
- 14009. "Eh Lor! Miss Molly"
- 14010. "We're Marching Round and Round Singing Game"
- 14011. "The Tramp"
- 14012. "The Fatal Run"
- 14013. "New Market Wreck"
- 14014. "The Wreck of the Norfolk and Western Cannon Ball"
- 14015. "Ben Dewberry's Final Run"
- 14016. "The Wreck of No.52"
- 14017. "The Wreck of the Sportsman"
- 14018. "The Dying Engineer"
- 14019. "The Wreck of the Virginian"
- 14020. "The Wreck of the Virginian No.3"
- 14037. "Shall We Gather At the River"
- 14056. "Érin grá mo chroí", "Own Native Lands Far Away"

=== 15,001 to 16,000 ===
- 15144. "Hello Stranger"
- 15158. "Solidarity Forever"
- 15159. "Which Side Are You On?"
- 15161. "So Long, It's Been Good to Know Yuh" (Woody Guthrie)
- 15162. "Sixteen Tons" (Merle Travis)
- 15176. "If It Wasn't for Dicky" (Lead Belly)
- 15211. "Rock Island Line"
- 15220. "Go Tell It On the Mountain"
- 15295. "Are You Washed in the Blood"
- 15381. "Goodbye, My Lover, Goodbye"; not to be confused with Goodbye My Lover Goodbye
- 15417. "Devil's Dream"
- 15418. "Hey Betty Martin" "Pretty Betty Martin"
- 15419. "After the Ball"
- 15420. "Three Little Angels"
- 15472. "Do Your Ears Hang Low?"
- 15479. "Leather Britches"
- 15530. "The Lady and the Swine"
- 15534. "The Factory Girl" (c.f. 1569)
- 15532. "Follow the Drinkin' Gourd"
- 15581. "Benny Havens oh" (See also Roud V8648)
- 15600. "When First to This Country a Stranger I Came"
- 15632. "Sleep On Beloved"
- 15634. "The John B. Sails"
- 15712. "My Body Has Tuberculosis"
- 15724. "Watermelon"
- 15989. "Talking Blues"
- 16000. "Cotton Fever"

=== 16,001 to 17,000 ===
- 16001. "Woman's Tongue Will Run Forevermore"
- 16002. "Texas Girl"
- 16003. "There's Nothing Like A Song"
- 16004. "The Tinware Man"
- 16005. "Sparkling Blue Eyes" "The Ramshackle Shack"
- 16006. "The T and P Line"
- 16007. "The Silent Sea"
- 16008. "Chittlin' Cookin' Time In the Cheatham County"
- 16009. "Disappointed in Love"
- 16010. "Barroom Blues"
- 16011. "Chain Gang"
- 16012. "Little Bunch of Roses"
- 16013. "Darlin' Baby"
- 16014. "Hillbilly Gal"
- 16015. "The Highway Hobo"
- 16016. "Good Night Greeley"
- 16017. "The German Kaiser"
- 16018. "I'll Get Along Without You Very Well"
- 16019. "I'm Leaving You This Lonesome Song"
- 16020. "MacKay's Goat" "About a Goat" "I Bought a Goat"
- 16071. "Tennessee Waltz"
- 16143. "The Free Train"
- 16151. "In Dem Long Hot Summer Days", "Old Riley"
- 16162. 'Billy in the Lowlands" "Billy in the Low Ground"
- 16339. "Star light, star bright"
- 16347. "Somebody Stole Our Big Black Dog"
- 16378. "This Land Is Your Land"
- 16397. "Linstead Market"
- 16412. "Lost Johnny"
- 16577. "The Tailor and the Mouse"
- 16629. "Hobo's Lullaby"
- 16636. "Lamorna"
- 16652. "Our Sarah"
- 16718. "Sullivan's John"
- 16787. "The Deil's awa' wi' th' Exciseman" (Robert Burns)
- 16813. "When I First Came To This Land"
- 16814. "It's Raining, It's Pouring", "It's Raining"
- 16821. "Poor Man's Heaven" (Carson Robison)
- 16822. "Going Down the River" "Boating Up Sandy"
- 16847. "Rye Straw" "Johnny Gray"
- 16874. "Swell My Net Full"
- 16898. "While Shepherds Watched Their Flocks"
- 16907. "After Aughrim's Great Disaster", "Seán Ó Duibhir A' Ghleanna"
- 16916. "Remember, Remember the Fifth of November"
- 16932. "Molly Malone"
- 16945. "The Cotton Mill Song"
- 16962. "Kiss Me Goodnight, Sergeant Major"

=== 17,001 to 18,000 ===
- 17004. "Mop It Down", "Drink Her Down", "Here's to the Good Old Beer"
- 17709. "Awake Arise Good Christians"
- 17043. "Fraulein"
- 17141. "Let Union Be In All Our Hearts"
- 17244. "I Know What It Means to Be Lonesome"
- 17321. "No Depression in Heaven"
- 17329. "Sweet Heaven in My View"
- 17558. "Cocaine", "Simply Wild About My Good Cocaine"
- 17575. "The Old Cabin Home"
- 17586. "Pretty Little Widow"
- 17590. "Sugar in the Gourd"
- 17591. "Sauerkraut Song"
- 17592. "When the Sunset Turns the Ocean Blue to Gold"
- 17593. "Sal's Gone to the Cider Mill"
- 17594. "In the Woodpile"
- 17595. "The Death of Edward Harkin"
- 17596. "Drifting Too Far From the Shore"
- 17597. "My Mother Told Me" "A Naughty Girl" "Rubber Dolly"
- 17598. "Four Cent Cotton"
- 17599. "The Darktown Strutters' Ball"
- 17600. "Alabama Jubilee"
- 17601. "It Tickles Me"
- 17602. "Dance the Georgia Poss"
- 17603. "Broken Bed Blues"
- 17604. "Black Cat Blues:"
- 17605. "Bamalong Blues"
- 17606. "Travelin' Railroad Man Blues"
- 17607. "The New Talkin' Bout You"
- 17608. "no record"
- 17609. "Lawdy Lawdy Blues"
- 17610. "String Band Blues"
- 17624. "The Sinking of the Reuben James"
- 17635. "Sail Away Ladies"
- 17648. "The Gypsy Countess"
- 17672. "Delia's Gone", "Delia"
- 17692. "Fishing Blues"
- 17701. "Poor Boy Blues", "Poor Boy, Long Ways From Home"
- 17717. "Whispering Hope"
- 17740. "One Day While Working At My Plough" "Mother Magpie" "A Comic Duett"
- 17741. "'Twas Down in the Low Countrie"
- 17742. "Orange Blossom Special"
- 17743. "Pullman Passenger Train"
- 17744. "Riding on the Elevated Railroad"
- 17745. "What the Engine Done"
- 17746. "The Freemason's Son"
- 17747. "Newfoundland and Sebastopol"
- 17748. "Near to the Isle of Portland"
- 17749. "The Merchants of Fogo"
- 17750. "The Murder of Young Somers"
- 17760. "The London Steamer"
- 17768. "This Little Light of Mine"
- 17770. "Cock a doodle doo"
- 17771. "The Weaver and the Factory Maid"
- 17774. "The Music Man"
- 17840. "When Wilt Thou Save the People" (Ebenezer Elliott)
- 17859. "Just Because (You Think You're So Pretty)"
- 17913. "The Eighth of January" "The Battle of New Orleans"
- 17930. "O Mary What You Weepin' About"
- 17931. "When Jesus Brought the Light To Me"
- 17932. "Bonaparte's Retreat"
- 17933. "Book of Revelation"
- 17934. "Looking Like Me Brother" "The Twins" "My Brother John and I" "Crooked-Legged John"
- 17935. "Bugle Call To Heaven"
- 17936. "Cabin in the Hills of Caroline"
- 17937. "The Cabin on the Hill"
- 17938. "Walking Down Canal Street"
- 17939. "The Cane Press"
- 17940. "Careless Soul"

=== 18,001 to 19,000 ===
- 18130. "You Are My Sunshine" (Jimmie Davis, Charles Mitchell)
- 18160. "Riley Riley"
- 18229. "The Mountains of Mourne"
- 18257. "Does the Spearmint Lose Its Flavor on the Bedpost Overnight"
- 18267. "Eeny, meeny, miny, moe"
- 18278. "Rise Up Shepherds and Follow"
- 18324. "I'm Going Back to Dixie"
- 18341. "Angelina Baker"
- 18411. "Nine Times a Night"
- 18437. "I'll Fly Away"
- 18506. "Little Red School House"
- 18510. "Long Black Veil" (Danny Dill, Marijohn Wilkin)
- 18521. "Nobody Knows You When You're Down and Out" (Jimmy Cox)
- 18556. "Brown's Ferry Blues"
- 18564. "Two Little Boys" (Theodore F. Morse, Edward Madden)
- 18669. "Good Old Mountain Dew"
- 18815. "London Lights"
- 18829. "Must I Be Bound?"
- 18830. "Beam of Oak"
- 18834. "There Is a Tavern in the Town"
- 18836. "The Dogger Bank"
- 18867. "How Can a Poor Man Stand Such Times and Live?"
- 18905. "Outward and Homeward Bound"
- 18955. "Where Has My Little Dog Gone"
- 18956. "Goodbye, Dolly Gray"

=== 19,001 to 20,000 ===
- 19019. "Coulters Candy" (Robert Coltart)
- 19028. "Lulle Lullay", "The Coventry Carol"
- 19096. "Rain Rain Go Away"
- 19103. "The Man of Double Deed"
- 19109. "The Wren Song"
- 19132. "There was an Old Woman Who Lived in a Shoe"
- 19234. "Postman Postman"
- 19235. "Round and round the garden"
- 19236. "Row, Row, Row Your Boat"
- 19237. "Taffy was a Welshman"
- 19297. "This Little Piggy"
- 19299. "Solomon Grundy"
- 19334. "Old Mother Hubbard"
- 19335. "Policeman Policeman"
- 19478. "Hey Diddle Diddle"
- 19479. "Jack Sprat"
- 19526. "Monday's Child"
- 19532. "Georgie Porgie"
- 19536. "Lucy Locket"
- 19557. "Leaning on the Lamb"
- 19621. "Tom, Tom, the Piper's Son"
- 19626. "Mary, Mary, Quite Contrary"
- 19631. "Pease Porridge Hot"
- 19639. "Ride a cock horse to Banbury Cross"
- 19689. "Hark, Hark! The Dogs Do Bark"
- 19695. "Three wise men of Gotham"
- 19712. "Doctor Foster"
- 19744. "The Man in the Moon"
- 19745. "Peter Piper"
- 19772. "As I was going to St Ives"
- 19777. "Simple Simon"
- 19798. "Roses Are Red"
- 19800. "Tweedledum and Tweedledee"
- 19808. "On Ilkla Moor Baht 'at"

=== 20,001 and above ===
- 20004. "If wishes were horses, beggars would ride"
- 20096. "One for Sorrow"
- 20105. "Bell Bottom Trousers"
- 20174. "In Marble Halls", "In Marble Walls"
- 20420. "You Might Easy Know a Doffer"
- 20605. "Little Miss Muffet"
- 20612. "Little Robin Redbreast"
- 20764. "Streets of Forbes"
- 20854. "This Is the House That Jack Built"
- 20960. "San Francisco Bay Blues"
- 21028. "Poor Little Kitty Puss"
- 21098. "The Rout of the Blues"
- 21100. "The Sailor's Alphabet"
- 21113. "The Ryans and the Pittmans", "We'll Rant and We'll Roar"
- 21256. "Ben Backstay"
- 21280. "As We Parted At the Gate"
- 21377. "Jesus Hold My Hand"
- 21397. "The Man in the Moon"
- 21449. "Pay Me My Money Down"
- 21522. "Old Bill Mosher's Ford"
- 21715. "Whiskey you're the Devil"
- 21859. "Darby Kelly" (John Whitaker, Thomas Dibdin)
- 21931. "Tomorrow Shall Be My Dancing Day"
- 22062. "Spancil Hill" (Michael Considine)
- 22229. "Boar's Head Carol"
- 22317. "Shine On, Harvest Moon"
- 22417. "The Old Rugged Cross" (George Bennard)
- 22430. "Where is My Mama" "De Clouds Are Gwine To Roll Away"
- 22518. "All Around My Hat" (see also Roud 567)
- 22568. "The Night Visiting Song", "The Cocks Are Crowing", "Adieu Unto All True Lovers"
- 22620. "Awake Awake (You/Ye) Drowsy Sleeper(s)", "Arise Arise", "Cruel Father", "The Drowsy Sleeper", "Who Comes Tapping to My Window", "The Maiden's Complaint", "I'll Lock You Up in Your Bedchamber", "Who's There Who's There Under My Window", "Awake Awake Ye Drowsy Souls", "O Who is that that Raps (At My Window)", "Lovely Molly", "Single I'll Go to My Grave", "Let the Hills and Valleys Be Covered With Snow" (Laws M4) (English versions – see Roud 22621 for American versions)
- 22621. "(The) Silver Dagger" (Laws G21), "(The/O/You) Drows(e)y Sleeper(s)", "Willie and Mary", "(Kattie/Katie/Katy) Dear", "(Oh/O) Molly (Dear) (Go Ask Your Mother)", "Awake Arise (You Drowsy Sleeper)", "Who's that Knocking (At My Window)", "Awake (O) Awake", "Wake Up (You Drowsy Sleeper)", "(Who Is That Under My) Bedroom Window", "Love Will Find a Way", "Raft-man's Song", "Death of William and Nancy", "Georgy Boy", "An Ardent Lover", "(The) Shining Dagger", "Arise Arise", "Maggie and Willie", "Who Taps At My Bedroom Window", "Wake Oh Wake You Drowsy Sleeper", "Charlie and Bessie", "Sleepy Desert", "Little Willie", "Sluggard Lover", "Willie Darling", "Awake Awake My Old True Lover", "The Droopery Sleeper", "Who is At My Window Weeping", "Annie Girl", "Hark Hark Who's At My Window", "The Broken Token" (American versions – see Roud 22620 for English versions)
- 22645. "Uncle Pen"
- 22827. "Cawsand Bay"
- 22834. "Because He Was a Bonny Lad"
- 22910. "Down in those Valleys"
- 23107. "I Should Very Much Like to Know"
- 23373. "Leaky Ship"
- 23553. "Down at the Old Bull and Bush"
- 23565. "Danny Boy" (Frederic Weatherly)
- 23582. "The Dying Rebel"
- 23614. "Blackbird's Nest"
- 23650. "Streets of Laredo" (Laws B1)
- 23663. "Angels We Have Heard on High"
- 23978. "Ladies Auxiliary" (Woody Guthrie)
- 24111. "Jarama Valley" (see also Roud 10517)
- 24351. "The Bonny Cuckoo"
- 24484. "Three Acres and a Cow"
- 24754. "Good King Wenceslas"
- 24755. "O Come, All Ye Faithful"
- 27616. "This Old House"
- 24791. "The Lark in the Clear Air" (Samuel Ferguson)
- 24820. "The Ryebuck Shearer"
- 24862. "Wreck of the Titanic"
- 24978. "The Woad Song" (William Hope-Jones)
- 24991. "Mary Went to a Tea Party"
- 24996. "King Caractacus"
- 25304. "Away in a Manger"
- 25389. "All Things Bright and Beautiful" (Cecil Frances Alexander)
- 25608. "What Child Is This?"
- 25618. "Blue Skirt Waltz"
- 25620. "Rose of San Antone"
- 25621. "Wings Over the Navy"
- 25622. "The West a Nest and You"
- 25623. "For You"
- 25624. "Till We Meet Again"
- 25625. "Beautiful Girls of the Prairies"
- 25626. "I Hear a Rhapsody"
- 25627. "Till the Lights of London Shine Again"
- 25628. "Ferryboat Serenade"
- 25629. "Man With the Mandolin"
- 25630. "There'll Always Be An England"
- 25700. "I've Got a Pocketful of Dreams"
- 25701. "Little Old Cathedral in the Pines'
- 25702. "Some Day Sweetheart"
- 25703. "My Blue Heaven"
- 25704. "Good Night Sweetheart"
- 25705. "Sweet Mystery of Life"
- 25706. "Pete Knight's Last Ride"
- 25708. "My Little Swiss and Me"
- 25709. "Beautiful Blue Danube"
- 25710. "Carolina Lullaby"
- 25778. "All Through The Night"
- 25779. "Manitoba"
- 25792. "Far Away in Australia"
- 25804. "Jingle Bells" (James Lord Pierpont)
- 25813. "Minnie the Moocher"
- 25822. "Chicken Reel"
- 25903. "The Harvest Moon is Shining"
- 26301. "Deck the Halls" (Thomas Oliphant)
- 26530. "The House on the Hill"
- 26531. "How Dunville Grew"
- 26532. "How Great Thou Art"
- 26533. "How is That for High"
- 26534. "Hunting Song"
- 26535. "Hymn of Praise"
- 26536. "I Wanna Go Home"
- 26537. "I Am A Man From Newfoundland"
- 26538. "I Am a Newfoundlander"
- 26539. "I Am An Old Bachelor"
- 26540. "I Came Back Here to the Home Land"
- 26713. "The Little Drummer Boy", "The Carol of the Drum" (Katherine Kennicott Davis)
- 26736. "Lord of the Dance" (Sydney Carter)
- 26771. "The Manchester Rambler" (Ewan MacColl)
- 27114. "Quick's new speech for the fifth of November on the downfall of Guy Fawkes"
- 27546. "Scots Wha Hae" (Robert Burns)
- 27659. "Soldier's Joy"
- 27660. "Smoke on the Water"
- 27661. "Sing to Me Of Heaven"
- 27662. "Sing Low and Sing Lay"
- 27663. "Silver Bells"
- 27664. "She's My Gal" "Balls of Changle Shee"
- 27665. "She'll Trifle on You"
- 27666. "She Gave Everything Away"
- 27667. "She Forgot to Bring Him Back"
- 27668. "She Broke My Heart When She Said You All"
- 27669. "Searching for His Grave" "Soldier's Grave"
- 27670. "Saviour Calls I Will Answer"
- 28881. "Nearer, My God, to Thee" (Sarah Flower Adams)
- 29549. "The Humour Is On Me Now"
- 29877. "Sailor's Prayer"
- 30935. "The Owl and the Pussy-Cat"
- 30368. "Little Rabbit"
- 31270. "When the Old Sun Was A-Crawlin'"
- 31271. "In A Storm At Sea"
- 31272. "no record"
- 31273. "In the Shade of the Tree"
- 31274. "Irish Washerwoman"
- 31275. "Hush-A-Bye Baby"
- 31276. "The Jolly Boatman"
- 31277. "Down the River"
- 31278. "The Scioto Valley Mills"
- 31279. "The Old Skipper"
- 31376. "Mississippi Sawyer"
- 32459. "I Do Like to Be Beside the Seaside"
- 36252. "Take Me Out to the Ball Game" (Albert Von Tilzer, Jack Norworth)
- 38763. "Man From the Daily Mail"
- 39669. "The Boys of the Old Brigade"
- 41583. "Katie Daly"
- 42601. "Train Blues"
- 44320. "She Cost Me Seven and Six Pence"
- 44321. "Sign of the Fires By Night"
- 44322. "Sing Tra-La-La-La-La Tiddy Wink"
- 44323. "Skeleton Rag"
- 44324. "Snowbird"
- 44325. "So Glad I'm Here'
- 44326. "Some Says Peter Some Say Paul"
- 44327. "Sourwood Peaks"
- 44328. "Square With the World"
- 44329. "Street of Glencairn"
- 44330. "Sweetheart Kick Me"
- 43551. “Joe Hill”
- 43597. "Over the Waves" "Tommy My Lad"
- 44499. "Faded Love"
- 45058. "Scarlet Ribbons (For Her Hair)" (Jack Segal, Evelyn Danzig)
- 46420. "Ding Dong" (George Ratcliffe Woodward)
- 47125. "Wednesday Night Waltz"

=== "B" prefix ===
- B24532. "The Sandgate Dandling Song"

=== "V" prefix ===
- V652. "Five O'Clock in the Morning"
- V783. "Down by the Old Garden Gate"
- V2816. "The Long Lost Child", "Lament for the Long Lost Child"
- V2894. "Little Rose"
- V4266. "The Vicar of Bray"
- V4761. "Hope The Hermit"
- V5007. "Cheer! Boys, Cheer! For the Fall of Sebastopol"
- V7466. "Seán Ó Duibhir a’ Ghleanna", "John O'Dwyer of the Glen"
- V8648. "Benny Havens Oh" (see also Roud 15581)
- V11404. "The Dolefull Dance and Song of Death", "Shaking of the Sheets"
- V11800. "I Remember the Hour When Sadly We Parted"
- V11801. "If Ere That Dreadful Hour"
- V11802. "The Nightingale's Note" "It Is The Hour"
- V11803. "Love's Delightful Hour"
- V11805. "The Lone Starry Hours"
- V11806. "Sweet Hour of Prayer"
- V11807. "The Sweet Social Hour"
- V11808, "Oh Sweet is the Hour"
- V11809. "There's Some Spell in this Hour" "To Hear a Sweet Goldfinch's Sonnet"
- V11810. "This is the Hour When Memory Wakes"
- V11915. "Maid of LLanwellyn"
- V11958. "I Belong to Glasgow" (Will Fyffe)
- V13849. "Kelly The Boy From Killane" (Patrick Joseph McCall)
- V15486. "Pomona"
- V16241. "Gospel Raft"
- V16366. "Tom Of Bedlam"
- V18192. "Cricket on the Hearth"
- V18439. "Guy Fawkes"
- V18701. "It was a lover and his lass" (William Shakespeare, Thomas Morley)
- V20125. "Battle of New Orleans"
- V23070. "Pocahontas" "The Chieftain's Daughter
- V23285. "Don't Forget Your Old Shipmate"
- V25265. "The Land Song"
- V27650. "no record"
- V27651. "The Apple Stall"
- V27652. "The Bride's First Night"
- V27653. "Keep Off the Grass"
- V27654. "Anthony's Address to the Romans" "Cholera Morbus"
- V27655. "Lamentation on the Foul Charges Made on the Redemptionist Fathers"
- V27656. "Garibaldi's Visit to England"
- V27657. "The Auld House At Hame"
- V27658. "The Languishing Lover"
- V27659, "The Secret Lover" "I Languish for the One That Ne'er Thinks of Me'
- V27660. "If Languishing Eye Without Language Can Move"
- V28517. "Ned of the Hill" (English version of Éamonn an Chnoic) (See also Roud 8136)
- V28639. "Down by the Sally Gardens" (W. B. Yeats, believed to have been inspired by Roud 386)
- V31021. "Ye Jacobites by Name" (Robert Burns) (See also Roud 5517)
- V31022. "Such a Parcel of Rogues in a Nation" (Robert Burns)
- V31204. "Smiles"
- V32851. "Tim Evans" (Ewan MacColl)
- V33250. "The Yorkshire Irishman"
- V34542. "I Can't Find Brummagem"
- V35719. "If It Wasn't for the 'Ouses In Between"
- V38186. "Drowned Lovers" (see also Roud 91)
- V39245. "My Love's in Germany"
- V43780. "Always"
- V44081. "Will ye go to Sheriffmuir"
- V45381. "The Red Flag" (Jim Connell)
- V48016. "The Town in Danger of a Siege"
- V48257. "The Labourers' Union"
- V53398. "Proper Cup of Coffee" (Bert Lee, R. P. Weston)
- V53400. "Down Below" (Sydney Carter)
- V56772. "Soap, Starch and Candles"
- V57582. "My Gal"
- V58618. "Smiles"
- V64378. "The Eighth of January or the Victory at New Orleans'
- V64973. "The Humours Of Whiskey"
- V70096. "Westering Home" (Hugh S. Roberton)

== See also ==
- List of the Child Ballads
- List of Irish ballads
- Roud Folk Song Index ("Roud numbers")
- Child Ballads ("Child numbers")
- George Malcolm Laws ("Laws numbers")
