= List of the Child Ballads =

List of ballads collected by Francis James Child

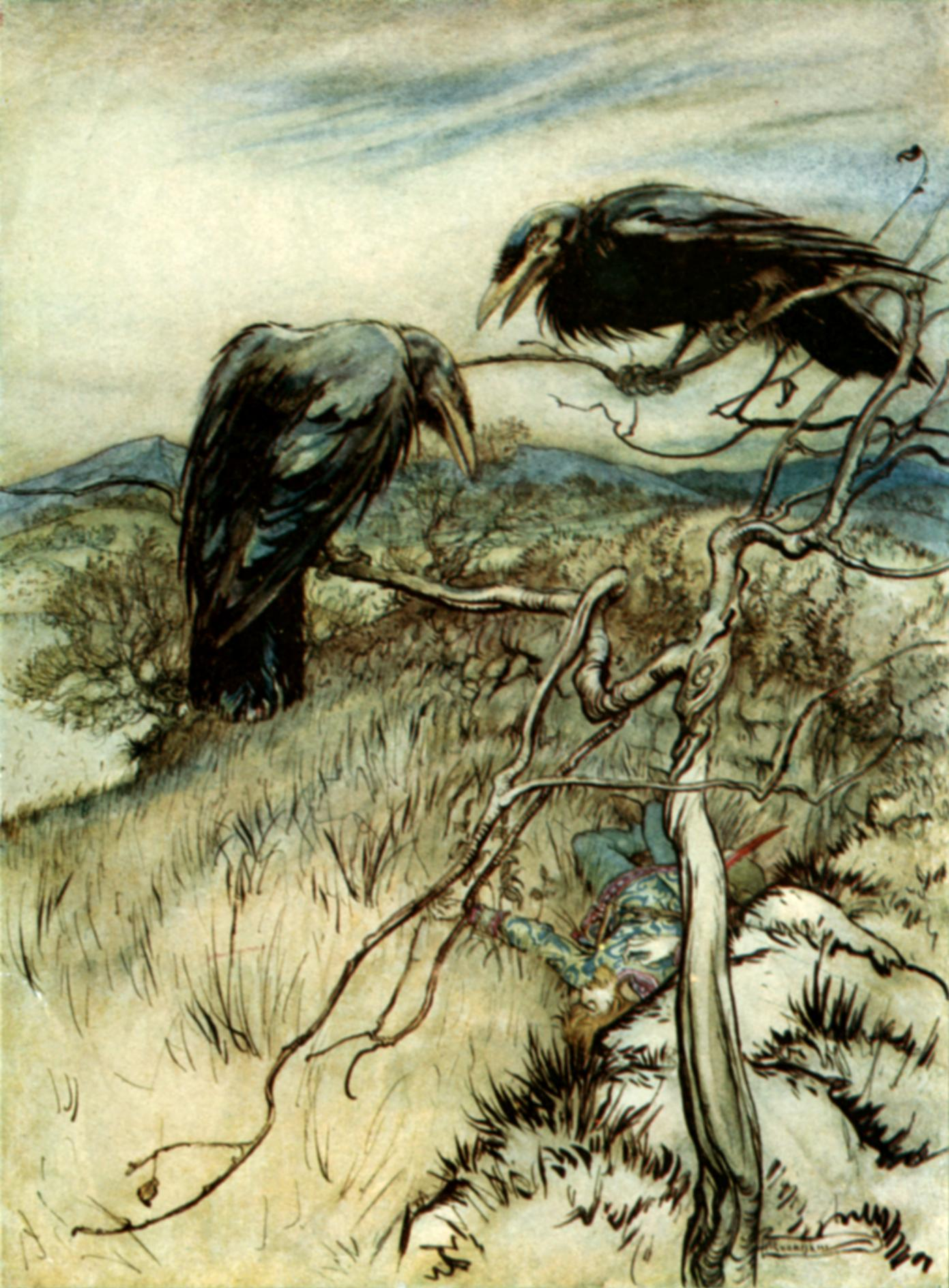
"The Three Ravens", an Arthur Rackham illustration of Child Ballad 26.

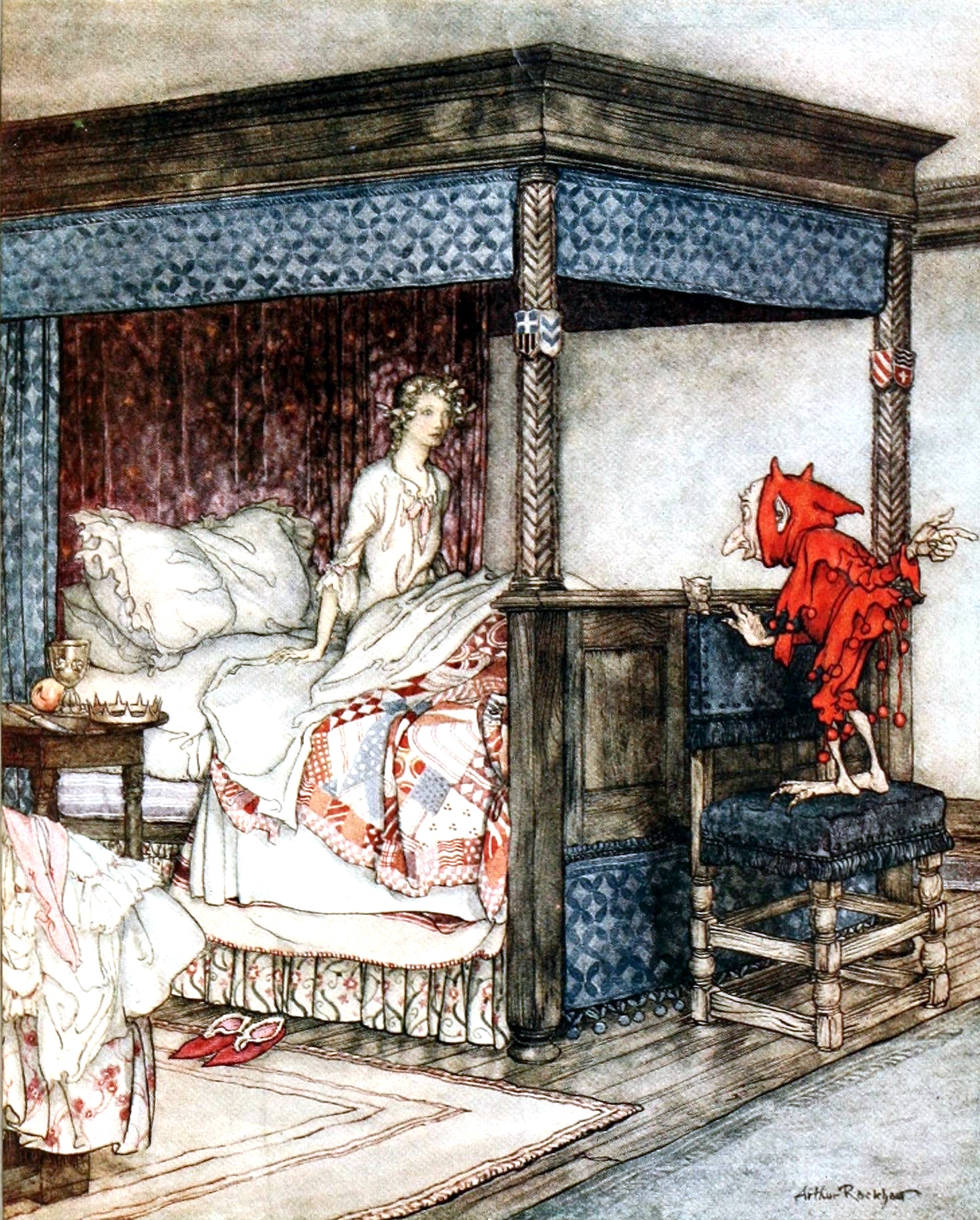
"‘O waken, waken, Burd Isbel", from "Young Beichan", Child Ballad 53.

The Child Ballads is the colloquial name given to a collection of 305 ballads collected in the 19th century by Francis James Child and originally published in ten volumes between 1882 and 1898 under the title The English and Scottish Popular Ballads.

== The ballads ==
Following are synopses of the stories recounted in the ballads in Child's collection. Since Child included multiple versions of most ballads, the details of a story can vary widely. The synopses presented here reflect the summaries in Child's text, but also rely on other sources as well as the ballads themselves.

The Child Ballads
Number	Title	Synopsis
1	Riddles Wisely Expounded	A knight courts three sisters. He promises to marry the youngest if she can answer his riddles. When she does, he either marries her, or in an early variation, reveals he is the Devil.
2	The Elfin Knight	Depending on the variation, a man, king or "elfin" knight offers to marry a woman if she completes his preposterous tasks. She replies to the requests with her own challenges, equally impossible.
3	The Fause Knight Upon the Road	While traveling, a schoolboy meets the devil disguised as a knight. The boy survives by matching wits with the false knight, finding a suitable comeback to each of his remarks.
4	Lady Isabel and the Elf Knight	A knight courts Lady Isabel, promising to marry her if she rides away with him. When they reach the forest (or seashore), he prepares to murder her, as he did seven others. Using her wits, Lady Isabel tricks the knight and slays him.
5	Gil Brenton	Gil Brenton brings his bride home, but she learns he will cut off her breasts if he finds she is not a virgin. Not only had she slept with someone before, a lord she met in the wood, but she is now pregnant. When the truth finally comes out, it is revealed the lord in question was Gil Brenton.
6	Willie's Lady	Willie weds a lady, but his mother, who is a witch, disapproves of the bride. She casts a spell to prevent her from bearing a child. Willie tricks his mother with a fake baby made of wax, and in a rage his mother blurts out the secret to breaking the spell.
7	Earl Brand	The Earl falls in love with a lady of high nobility. Her father disapproves, and when the couple runs off, he sends his sons after them. The Earl slays most of their pursuers but is severely wounded. The lovers continue their flight until the Earl's condition worsens and he dies.
8	Erlinton	Erlinton locks his daughter in her bower to keep her from sin. Her true love Willie comes in the night and spirits the daughter away. Erlinton sends his knights in pursuit. Willie slays all but one of his attackers, and the couple escapes.
9	The Fair Flower of Northumberland	A Scottish knight is captured by the Earl of Northumberland. The knight persuades the Earl's daughter to free him, promising to marry her as soon as they get to Scotland. When they reach his home, he tells her to go back, that he already has a wife and children. After begging the knight to take her as a servant or kill her, the fair flower returns home to face disgrace.
10	The Twa Sisters	A knight courts an older sister while favoring a younger one. When the two sisters go down by the water, the older drowns the younger. The girl's body is recovered and made into an instrument. As the knight and older sister are about to wed, the instrument sings out the truth.
11	The Cruel Brother	A knight and lady are to marry, but they fail to ask her brother John's consent. At their wedding, John stabs her. She lives long enough to make bequests to members of her family. When asked what she would will to her brother, she replies, "The gallows-tree to hang him on."
12	Lord Randal	Lord Randal's mother asks him a series of questions about his day. He gives accurate but short answers, each time begging for rest. Finally, his mother fears he has been poisoned, and Lord Randal admits that he has been. In making his final bequests, he reveals his lover is the murderer.
13	Edward	Edward's mother questions him about the blood on his coat or knife. After several evasions, he admits to murdering his brother or father. She then asks what he will leave his family. Despondent, he promises his wife grief and sorrow, his son a weary world and his mother the fires of hell.
14	Babylon; or, The Bonnie Banks o Fordie	Three sisters encounter a robber who threatens to murder each if they refuse to become his wife. After he kills two of the maids, the youngest reveals she has a brother who is an outlaw who will surely retaliate. The attacker then realizes the girls are his sisters and kills himself.
15	Leesome Brand	Leesome Brand went to court when ten years old. An eleven-year-old girl fell in love with him, but nine months later, called on him to saddle horses, take her dowry, and flee with her. They headed to his mother's house, but she went into labour on the way. He went off to hunt, but violated a prohibition she laid on him, either not to hunt a milk-white hind, or to come running when called, and she and his son died. He went home and lamented this to his mother.
16	Sheath and Knife	A sister is pregnant with her brother's child. She asks him to kill her, or dies in childbirth. He buries both of them and grieves. The sheath and knife represent his sister and child.
17	Hind Horn	A man leaves his sweetheart while in possession of a ring which will turn pale when she is unfaithful to him. When the ring grows pale, he comes back and finds that she is about to be married to someone else. He exchanges clothes with a beggar, begs for wine from her, and slips the ring in the glass. She recognizes him and abandons her bridegroom.
18	Sir Lionel	Sir Lionel encounters a lady who tells him a boar has slain her lord and 30 of his men. The knight kills the murderous boar and is confronted by its owner - a giant in some versions, a wild woman in others - who demands payment. In the end, the knight slays the boar's owner.
19	King Orfeo	King Orfeo's wife is stolen away by the fairies. He plays his instrument for the fairies in order to win her back.
20	The Cruel Mother	A young woman becomes pregnant while unmarried. She kills her child (sometimes two children) after it is born and later sees its ghost.
21	The Maid and the Palmer (The Samaritan Woman)	A palmer begs a cup from a maid who is washing at the well, so that he could drink from it. She says she has none. He says that she would have, if her lover came. She swore she had never had a lover. He says that she has borne nine babies and tells her where she buried the bodies. She begs some penance from him. He tells her that she will be transformed into a stepping-stone for seven years, a bell-clapper for seven, and spend seven years in hell.
22	St. Stephen and Herod	Depicts the martyrdom of Saint Stephen as occurring, with wild anachronism, under Herod the Great, and claims that that was the reason for St. Stephen's Day being the day after Christmas.
23	Judas	Christ gives Judas 30 pieces of silver to buy food for the Apostles; on his way to the market, Judas is waylaid by his sister, who lulls him to sleep and steals the money. Unwilling to confess his loss, Judas sells Christ to the Romans for the same amount.
24	Bonnie Annie	Annie, a merchant's daughter, falls in love with a sea captain and goes to sea with him, in some variants while pregnant. Something goes wrong, and the sailors determine that Annie is the cause of it. She makes the captain throw her overboard. He escapes, recovers her body, and buries her.
25	Willie's Lyke-Wake	Willie sets up his wake and lies in his winding cloth. His love discovers this and pleads with her father to let her go to him. When he does, and she enters the room, Willie rouses himself and declares that he will marry her at once.
26	The Three Ravens (or Twa Corbies)	A number of ravens see a dead knight and speculate about how they either cannot eat him because his hawk, hounds, and lady are watching him, or can eat him because he has been abandoned.
27	The Whummil Bore	The narrator served the king seven years and "saw his daughter only once" - meaning saw her naked, through a whummil bore. She was being dressed by her maids.
28	Burd Ellen and Young Tamlane	Burd Ellen is weeping. Young Tamlane tells her to rock her son. She tells him to rock the child himself, she has done more than her share. Instead, he goes to sea, with her curse.
29	The Boy and the Mantle	A boy comes to King Arthur's court with an enchanted mantle that cannot be worn by an unfaithful wife. Guinevere tries to wear it, and so does every other lady in the court; only one can wear it, and only after she confesses to kissing her husband before their marriage. Other boys also bring a wild boar, that can not be cut by a cuckold's knife, and a cup that a cuckold can not drink from without spilling it, and these also reveal that every wife at court has been unfaithful.
30	King Arthur and King Cornwall	After bragging about the excellence of his famed Round Table, King Arthur is told by Guinevere that another king has an even better one. Arthur and his company leave their kingdom (here Brittany rather than Great Britain) in disguise searching for this king, and eventually come to Cornwall, where the resident monarch offends them with a series of boasts about his magical items, the child he fathered on Guinevere, and Arthur's comparative mediocrity. All go off to bed, and the Knights of the Round Table make a series of vows against Cornwall's boasts, such as Gawain's declaration that he will make off with Cornwall's daughter.
31	The Marriage of Sir Gawain	Gawain marries a loathly lady in order to save King Arthur from death. It is later revealed that she is a beautiful lady under a spell.
32	King Henry	King Henry encounters a hideous woman while hunting. Out of courtesy, he salutes her, only to find her making incredible demands, first the flesh of his animals and finally that he bed her. When he does, he finds her transformed into a beautiful woman.
33	Kempy Kay	A deformed suitor courts an ugly maiden. Their grotesqueness is described in great detail, and in the end, the match is made.
34	Kemp Owyne	The heroine is turned into a worm (dragon), usually by her stepmother, who curses her to remain so until the king's son comes to kiss her three times. When he arrives, she offers him a belt, a ring, and a sword to kiss her, promising the things would magically protect him; the third time, she turns back into a woman. In some variants, he asks who enchanted her, a werewolf or mermaid; she says it was her stepmother and curses her into a monstrous creature, permanently.
35	Allison Gross	It tells the story of "the ugliest witch in the north country" who tries to persuade a man to become her lover and then punishes him by a transformation.
36	The Laily Worm and the Machrel of the Sea	A young man, transformed into a laily (loathly, or loathsome) worm, tells his story: his father married an evil woman as his stepmother, and she transformed him into a worm and his sister into a mackerel. His sister combed his hair every Saturday. He has killed seven knights, and if the man he was speaking to was not his father, he would be the eighth. His father sends for the stepmother, who claims his children are at court. He makes her use her silver wand to turn his son back, and then her magic horn to summon the fish, although the daughter holds back rather than let the stepmother transform her again. The father burns the stepmother at the stake.
37	Thomas Rymer	A minstrel meets an elfin lady under a tree and has to serve her in elf land for seven years.
38	The Wee Wee Man	The narrator meets with a very small man. He lifts an enormous stone and throws it, and she thinks that if she were as strong as Wallace, she could have lifted it to her knee. She asks him where he lives, and he has her come with him to a hall where there is a lady, sometimes explicitly called the fairy queen, and her ladies, usually twenty-four and so beautiful that the ugliest would make a fit queen of Scotland, but they, and the wee, wee man, instantly vanish.
39	Tam Lin	A young woman saves her lover from being used for the teind on Hallows Eve.
40	The Queen of Elfan's Nourice	A mortal woman laments being taken from her four-day-old son. The Queen of Elfland promises that if she nurses the queen's child, she will be returned. The Queen then points out their path: the road to Elfland, rather than to Heaven or Hell.
41	Hind Etin	Lady Margaret goes to the woods, and her breaking a branch is questioned by Hind Etin, who takes her with him into the forest. She bears him seven sons, but laments that they are never christened, nor she herself churched. One day, her oldest son goes hunting with Hind Etin and asks him why his mother always weeps. Hind Etin tells him, and then one day goes hunting without him. The oldest son takes his mother and brothers and brings them out of the woods. In some variants, they are welcomed back; in all, the children are christened, and their mother churched.
42	Clerk Corvill	Clerk Colvill, ignoring the advice of his lady or his mother, goes to a body of water, where a mermaid seduces him. His head starts to ache, and the mermaid tells him he will die of it. He goes home and dies. In some variants, she offers that he may go to sea with her instead of dying, and he refuses.
43	The Broomfield Hill	A man and a woman make a wager that she cannot visit him in the greenwood without losing her virginity, or she makes a tryst and realizes she can either stay and be foresworn, or go and lose her virginity. She goes, sometimes after advice from a witch-wife, and puts him in an enchanted sleep; then, leaving tokens that she had come and gone. He wakes and taxes those with him—his goshawk, his servingmen, his horse, or his hound—that they did not wake him, but they answer it was impossible. He is angry that he did not manage to take her virginity and, in many variants, murder her afterward.
44	The Twa Magicians	A blacksmith threatens to deflower (take the virginity of) a lady, who vows to keep herself a maiden. A transformation chase ensues, differing in several variants, but containing such things as she becomes a hare and he catches her as a greyhound, she becomes a duck and he becomes either a water dog or a drake. In the Child version of the ballad she does not escape, but in other common renderings, she does.
45	King John and the Bishop	King John, covetous of the bishop of Canterbury's wealth, compels him on pain of death to answer three impossible questions. The bishop's shepherd appears in disguise to substitute in his place, and answers the questions cleverly in riddle fashion, after which the appeased king rewards the shepherd and spares the bishop.
46	Captain Wedderburn's Courtship	Versions differ, but generally a captain meets a lady walking in the woods or through an estate. Sometimes he takes her to where he is staying. In all variants, she says she will not marry or sleep with him without his answering riddles. She asks them. He answers them all, and they are married and/or he takes her to bed.
47	Proud Lady Margaret	A man arrives at the heroine's castle to woo her. She is frequently critical of him, on the grounds that his clothing shows him to be no gentleman. In most variants, he taxes her with riddles such as "What's the first thing in flower?" (primrose), and in the end, she accepts his suit. He reveals that he is her brother and a ghost, sometimes after she has said she will go with him and he must forbid, as it will kill her. He tells her he has come to curb her haughtiness.
48	Young Andrew	Andrew seduces Helen and tells her he will fulfill his promise to marry her only if she brings him her father's gold. She does. He robs her not only of it but all her clothing. She goes home, naked. Her father is furious. Her heart breaks, killing her, and her father regrets it. Meanwhile, Andrew encounters a wolf in the woods, and it kills him; the gold still lies by his body.
49	The Twa Brothers	Two brothers are wrestling when a blade that one of them is carrying mortally wounds the other; occasionally, one of them stabs the other intentionally. Attempts to staunch the blood are not successful, and the dying brother tells the living one (usually) how to bury him, and (always) a long list of excuses to give the rest of the family, about his traveling to distant locations, to avoid admitting his death, ending with the injunction to tell his true love the truth.
50	The Bonny Hind	A squire persuades a maiden to lie with him. Afterward, she asks his name, and he reveals that he is a lord's son. She calls him a liar: she is that lord's daughter. The horror-struck son reveals that he was long at sea. She stabs herself to death, and he buries her. He goes home and grieves for a "bonny hind", no matter what his father does to distract him.
51	Lizie Wan	The heroine—Lizie, Rosie, Lucy—is pregnant with her brother's child. Her brother murders her. He tries to pass off the blood as some animal he had killed—his greyhound, his falcon, his horse—but in the end must admit that he murdered her. He sets sail in a ship, never to return.
52	The King's Dochter Lady Jean	The heroine goes to the woods. A man meets her, tries to woo her, and rapes her. He asks her name, and they learn that they are brother and sister. In some variants, he kills her; in most, she goes home, and is tasked by her family for why she ails, and she and her brother both die when they meet there.
53	Young Beichan [or Young Bekie]	The hero is thrown into a dungeon in a far country. His captor's daughter frees him, and he pledges to marry her. On returning home, however, he is forced to marry. She arrives in time to stop the wedding.
54	The Cherry-Tree Carol	Mary, the mother of Jesus, asks her husband Joseph to pick her fruit from a tree. When he refuses, Jesus causes the tree to bend its branches down to her.
55	The Carnal and the Crane	A carnal tells a crane about the birth of Jesus: that he was born in a stable, of a virgin, and slept in a manger; that the Magi told King Herod of the birth, Herod said that if it were true, the cock on his table would revive and crow, and the cock did so; that Herod ordered the Massacre of the Innocents, that St. Joseph had to flee to Egypt and beasts worshiped Jesus on the way; that a husbandman's seed were miraculously sown and brought to harvest when Jesus passed, he reported that to Herod, and Herod, assuming that the growth has been natural, pulled back because he would never have been able to catch them if they were three-quarters of the year ahead.
56	Dives and Lazarus	The rich man Dives or Diverus makes a feast. The poor man Lazarus comes to Dives' door and repeatedly begs 'brother Dives' to give him something to eat and drink. Dives answers that he is not the brother of Lazarus, denies Lazarus food and drink, and sends his servants to whip him and his dogs to bite him. However, the servants are unable to whip Lazarus, and the dogs lick his sores instead of biting him. As both men die angels fetch Lazarus to heaven, and serpents take Dives to hell. In version A, Dives asks Lazarus for a drop of water, and complains about his eternal punishment.
57	Brown Robyn's Confession	Brown Robyn goes to sea. When those aboard are unable to see any lights in the sky, they "cast kevels" (drew lots) to determine Brown Robyn is to blame. Robyn confesses to incestuous relations with his mother, who bore him two children, and his sister, who bore five or, in other variants, to killing his father. He tells them to tie him to a piece of wood and let him sink or swim. He swims. Our Blessed Lady, with her "dear young son", appears to him and asks him if he would return to his men or come to heaven with her and her child. He asks to go to heaven. She tells him that it is not for any good he has done but for confessing his sin that he may come.
58	Sir Patrick Spens	Sir Patrick is ordered by the king to bring the King of Norway's daughter home. A storm comes up while they are sailing back to Scotland from Norway and the crew of the ship are drowned.
59	Sir Aldingar	Sir Aldingar is spurned by the queen and attempts to get revenge on her by putting a leper in her bed. A child saves her from the stake by championing her in a trial by combat.
60	King Estmere	King Estmere's brother Alder the Younger urges him to marry King Adland's daughter, and suggests that he look at the lady himself, rather than be deceived by any description. Once there, King Adland warns them that she put off the King of Spain, but he has her come down and she agrees to marry him, despite the threats of the King of Spain. King Estmere leaves, the King of Spain attacks, and the daughter sent a page after King Estmere to warn him of her danger. Adler is the son of a magician-woman and enchants King Estmere into the shape of a harper and himself into his boy. They infiltrate the castle, Alder kills the King of Spain, and the two fight off all his men. King Estmere and the daughter marry.
61	Sir Cawline	Sir Cawline falls ill for love of the king's daughter; she attends him. He desires to prove himself worthy of her; she sends him to vanquish the elvish king. He then defeats a giant threatening to wed her, and survives a lion attack before marrying her.
62	Fair Annie	A lord tells Fair Annie to prepare a welcome for his bride, and to look like a maiden. Annie laments that she has borne him seven sons and is pregnant with the eighth; she can not look like a maiden. She welcomes the bride but laments her fate, even wishing her sons evil, that they might be rats and she a cat. The bride comes to ask her why she grieves, and then asks her what her family was before the lord stole her. Then she reveals that she is Annie's full sister and will give her her dowry, so that Annie can marry the lord instead of her; she is a maiden still and so can return home.
63	Child Waters	The pregnant Margaret, or Faire Ellen, is told by Child Waters (or Lord John) that she should bide at home. In some variants, he offers her lands to support his child, and she tells him that she would rather have one kiss from him than all his lands. He tells her that she must dress his footpage and will suffer—in some variants, even worse conditions that his horse and hound. She still goes with him. After they arrive at home, she gives birth. Child Waters gives her the best bed in his castle to lie in and promises that they will marry on the same day that she is churched.
64	Fair Janet	Janet is in love with Willie, but her father insists on her marrying a French lord. They attempt to flee, but she goes into labor and can not escape. She hands their baby to Willie, for his care, and he delivers the baby to his mother and goes to the wedding. Janet is ill and dies during the dancing. In many variants, the bridegroom swears that no church bells will ring for her, and Willie that they all will. In most, Willie dies within a day, and those where he does not, the story cuts off.
65	Lady Maisry	The heroine—Maisry, Janet, Margery, Marjory, Susie—becomes pregnant (sometimes after rejecting many Scottish lords). She declares that she will not surrender her (often English) true love. Her family goes to burn her. A page boy goes to fetch the true love, but he arrives too late.
66	Lord Ingram and Chiel Wyet	Lord Ingram and Chiel Wyet are brothers who fall in love with the same woman, Maisry. She falls in love with Wyet and becomes pregnant by him. Her father arranges the marriage to Lord Ingram. At the wedding, he learns of the baby; he may offer to claim the baby as his own, and she refuses, or he refuses. Lord Ingram and Chiel Wyet kill each other. Lady Maisry goes mad, resolving to beg, or go on pilgrimage, until she dies, and more for Lord Ingram than Chiel Wyet.
67	Glasgerion	Glasgerion is a king's son and a harper. He harps before another king, whose daughter arranges a tryst with him. He tells his servant to ensure that he wakes in time to make the tryst. The servant goes in his place and rapes the princess. She learns the truth and kills herself, sometimes because she can not offer herself as Glasgerion's bride. Glasgerion kills his servant and either kills himself as well or goes mad.
68	Young Hunting	A woman's lover, Young Hunting, tells her he is off to meet another whom he loves more. When he goes to kiss her (in other versions, she gets him drunk, and they sleep together), she mortally stabs him with a pen knife. She then learns from a bird that he loved only her, but all she cares about is disposing of the corpse.
69	Clerk Saunders	The earl's son and May Margaret are determined to wed, a union is opposed by her seven brothers. When the two are discovered in bed, the brothers stab him to death for her to find when she awakes.
70	Willie and Lady Maisry	The lady invites Willie to her room, and on his way, he kills her father's guards including her brother. She welcomes him in, but her father discovers them together and slays Willie with his sword. The lady dies of a broken heart.
71	The Bent Sae Brown	Willie travels to stay overnight with the king's daughter. As he leaves, she warns him that her three brothers are hiding in the brown grass. He slays them, and their mother appeals to the king, who rules in favor of the lovers.
72	The Clerk's Twa Sons O Owsenford	The clerk's two sons go abroad to study. When they are caught sleeping with the mayor's daughters, the mayor condemns them to death. Their father tries to buy their freedom, but the mayor refuses, and the two are hanged.
73	Lord Thomas and Fair Annet	Lord Thomas asks his mother whether he should marry the beautiful Annet or the "nut-brown" girl with a dowry. The mother prefers the wealthy girl. Thomas consents, but invites Annet to the wedding. Jealous, the brown girl stabs Annet. Thomas then kills her and himself.
74	Fair Margaret and Sweet William	Fair Margaret espies the marriage procession of her lover Sweet William and another woman from her high chamber window. Depending on the variation, Margaret either commits suicide or dies of a broken heart. Her ghost then appears before Sweet William to ask him if he loves his new bride more than herself, and William replies he loves Margaret better. In the morning, William commences to search for Margaret. Upon arriving at her estate, Margaret's family shows William the corpse. In some versions, Sweet William dies of heartbreak as well, and they are buried beside each other.
75	Lord Lovel	A lord tells his lady he is going away. After a time he longs to see her so he returns, hears of her death and dies of grief. They are buried together and a lovers' knot grows.
76	The Lass of Roch Royal	A woman comes to Gregory's castle, pleading to be let in; she is either pregnant or with a newborn son. His mother turns her away; sometimes she tells her that he went to sea, and she goes to follow him and dies in shipwreck. Gregory wakes and says he dreamed of her. He chases her, finds her body, and dies.
77	Sweet William's Ghost	A lover, usually named William or a variant, appears as a ghost to his love, usually Margaret or a variant. He asks her to release him from his promise to marry her. She may insist that he actually marry her, but he says that he is dead; she may insist that he kiss her, but he says that one kiss would kill her; she may insist on some information about the afterlife, and he tells her some of it; he may tell her that his promise to marry her is a hellhound that will destroy him if she does not free him. In the end she always releases him from his promise, although in some versions she then dies upon his grave.
78	The Unquiet Grave	A man mourns his true love for "a twelve month and a day". At the end of that time, the dead woman complains that his weeping is keeping her from peaceful rest. He begs a kiss. She tells him it would kill him. When he persists, wanting to join her in death, she explains that once they were both dead their hearts would simply decay, and that he should enjoy life while he has it.
79	The Wife of Usher's Well	A woman from Usher's Well sends her sons away to school, only to find a few weeks later that they had died. She grieves their loss, cursing the winds and sea for their return. They do return, as ghosts, and convince her to let them rest in peace.
80	Old Robin of Portingale	Old Robin takes a young bride who immediately begins an affair with Sir Gyles. Warned by a page of their plot to have him killed, Robin slays Gyles and cuts off his wife's breasts and ears. Before going off to the Holy Land, he makes the page his heir.
81	Little Musgrave and Lady Barnard (or "Matty Groves")	A noble lady seduces a commoner. They are caught in bed by her husband who kills her lover in a duel. He then also kills her after she expresses a continuing preference for the lover over him.
82	The Bonny Birdy	A knight is riding when a bird asks him why he is about so late and tells him his wife is with her lover. It had been a wild bird until the lover caught it and gave it to his love. She did not feed it well, so it is telling her story. It flew with the knight to her bower, and sang of how the lover should be away. The lady asks what reason there is for him to leave, and the bird sings that a man in bed with another man's wife should always leave quickly. The knight enters the bower and kills the lover.
83	Child Maurice	The hero sends tokens to his lady and asks her to see him in the woods. Her lord learns of it and comes to where he will meet her, and kills him under the impression that he is her paramour. He brings back the head, and the lady confesses that he was her illegitimate son. Her lord is deeply grieved and declares he would never have killed him if he had known.
84	Bonny Barbara Allen	A young man lies dying for the love of Barbara Allen; he has a servant summon her to his bedside for solace, but she does little but scorn him. Denied his true love, the hero succumbs to illness; in some versions, he leaves her an inheritance before dying. Upon hearing the church bells of his funeral, Barbara Allen regrets her decision and senses that her own death is near. She too dies of heartbreak, and they are buried beside one another.
85	Lady Alice	Seeing a fine corpse being carried by, Lady Alice is told it is Giles Collins, her lover. She asks the bearers to leave it, saying she too will be dead by the next evening. Alice and her lover are buried apart, but the roses from his grave grow to reach her breast, at which point they are severed by the parish priest.
86	Young Benjie	Two lovers, Benjie and Marjorie, quarrel, and in anger she vows to seek another. A proud man, he throws her in a stream to drown. Marjorie's three brothers discover the body, and as they watch over the corpse, her spirit reveals it was Benjie who murdered her. The brothers offer to behead or hang him, but she asks them to poke out his eyes and take him to the stream every seven years as penance for his sin.
87	Prince Robert	Prince Robert's mother poisons him when he marries Fair Eleanor against her wishes. Dying, he sends for his bride but she arrives too late. Her only request is Robert's ring, but the mother refuses, and Eleanor dies from a broken heart. The two are buried apart, but a birch and brier grow from their graves to entwine as a sign of their love.
88	Young Johnstone	Johnstone tells his wife that he has killed her brother. To secure his love, she hides him in her secret bower from 24 knights who come in pursuit. After feeding the knights, they leave, but when she comes to him, Johnston awakens to stab her with his sword, apparently not meaning to. In another version, he stabs himself and dies.
89	Fause Foodrage	Three kings woo a lady, and the king who marries her is slain not long afterwards by a rebel, Fause Foodrage. The murderer spares the queen and offers to spare the child she bears if it turns out to be a girl. When a boy is born, the queen switches him for a girl. Some years later, the boy learns of his heritage, avenges his father's death, and marries the girl.
90	Jellon Grame	Jellon Grame kills his lover Lillie Flower with whom he has had a child, fearful of what her father will do. He then raises the boy as his sister's son. One day Jellon reveals his deed to the boy, who slays him with an arrow.
91	Fair Mary of Wallington	Seven sisters are destined to die in childbirth. After five succumb, the sixth, Fair Mary, vows never to wed, but is married off, becomes pregnant, and expecting to die after three days labor, has the child cut from her body. The youngest is doomed to the same fate, as her mother (in a variant) insists on marrying her off.
92	Bonny Bee Hom	A lady laments her absent love but vows to wait for him. Meanwhile, she has given him a ruby ring that will protect him and also tell whether she is either dead or untrue. After a year and a day, as he sails for home, the talisman turns dark indicating her death. Heartbroken, he too dies and their souls fly up to heaven.
93	Lamkin	Lamkin, a mason, builds a castle for his lord, but goes unpaid. As the lord leaves on a journey, he warns his wife to secure the castle, fearful of reprisal, but Lamkin gains entrance and kills the lord's infant son and wife. The lord returns to find the castle red with blood.
94	Young Waters	Young Waters rides into court to greet the king and catches the queen's attention. A wily lord asks her who is fairest face she has seen, and she replies "Young Waters." Jealous, the king has him thrown in prison, and despite his wife's pleas, has him executed.
95	The Maid Freed from the Gallows	A woman is sentenced to hang her from the gallows tree. Members of the woman's family - her father, mother, sister and brother - refuse to pay a bribe to the hangman, but her husband offers her weight in gold and saves her.
96	The Gay Goshawk	A Scottish squire sends a letter by goshawk to an English lass, pledging his love. Her father refuses to allow them to marry, but she asks him to promise to have her buried in Scotland should she die. She feigns her death by taking a sleeping potion. When her body is taken to Scotland, her love comes to mourn her. She awakens - in some variants, after he kisses her - and the two are united.
97	Brown Robin	The king's daughter falls in love with lowly Brown Robyn and sneaks him into her bower. To sneak him out, she dresses Robyn as one of her ladies. In a variant, he is shot by a suspicious porter, who is hanged at the daughter's request. In another, the two are allowed to marry.
98	Brown Adam	Brown Adam, a smith, builds a house for himself and his love after being banished by his family. One day, he returns from hunting to find a knight trying to woo his lady and then threatening her life when she refuses his bribes. Brown Adam saves her, cutting off the knight's hand with his sword.
99	Johnie Scot	Johnie, a brave knight serving in the English court, impregnates the king's daughter. He returns to Scotland, and when he sends for his love, he learns she has been imprisoned. Johnie's best friend offers his 500 bowmen, and they attack the palace, defeating the king's forces.
100	Willie O Winsbury	While the king is away, his daughter becomes pregnant by the hero, William or Thomas. The king threatens to hang him, but is struck by his beauty and offers him the heroine and gold. The hero accepts the lady but declares that he has both gold and lands enough of his own.
101	Willie O Douglas Dale	Willie, a Scottish lord serving in the English court, falls in love with and impregnates the king's daughter, Dame Oliphant. In fear of his life, the two flee and take shelter in the woods. After their son is born, they enlist the help of a shepherdess in sailing for Willie's homelands, where she becomes the lady of Douglas Dale.
102	Willie and the Earl Richard's Daughter	Willie, in service of Earl Richard, impregnates the earl's daughter. Fearing Richard's wrath, the couple escapes to the woods, where their son is born. They name him Robin Hood (though the ballad is not considered part of the Robin Hood cycle). In a variant, the mother dies, and the earl makes the boy his heir.
103	Rose the Red and White Lily	Rose and Lily lose their mother, and their father weds an evil woman who has two sons. The sons each fall in love with a stepsister - Bold Arthur with Rose and Brown Robin with Lily - but their mother sends her sons away. The girls disguise themselves as men and run off in search of their loves. After a series of adventures, the couples are reunited and marry.
104	Prince Heathen	Prince Heathen murders Lady Margery's family, takes her virginity and while waiting for his child to be born, suffers cruelties upon Margery to break her will. Only when he succeeds - she is close to death in one variant and dies in another - does he find love for her.
105	The Bailiff's Daughter of Islington	A squire's son falls in love with the bailiff's daughter. His family opposes the relationship, and he is sent to London for a seven-year apprenticeship. After seven years, the daughter disguises herself and sets out to find if he is still true. Encountering him along the way, she begs a penny. When he inquires about the bailiff's daughter, she says she is dead. He is heartbroken, and with that, she reveals herself and offers to wed.
106	The Famous Flower of Serving-Men	Fair Elise's husband and child are murdered by agents of her mother. She cuts her hair, disguises herself as a man and as Sweet William becomes a servant at the king's court. She serves the king well enough to be named chamberlain. When the king eventually learns the truth, he marries her.
107	Will Stewart and John	Will Stewart falls in love with the Earl of Mar's daughter. Will has his brother John, who is wiser, speak to the daughter on his behalf. The daughter is moved but sets a challenge, which Will satisfies, but the earl refuses to allow them to marry. Will falls ill and again his brother talks with the daughter, who agrees to marry. Twelve months later, they bear a son and gain the earl's acceptance.
108	Christopher White	The Earl of Edinburgh, a wealthy merchant, comes upon a maid who mourns that her lover, Christopher White, has been banished from England. The earl offers more and more gold for her hand, and she tells him that if she would be false to her lover, she would be untrue to him. Finally, she relents and they marry. Within a few months, she sends for Christopher, and they run off with the gold. The merchant laments her loss but admits he had been warned.
109	Tom Potts	A lady of stature, in love with a servant, Tom Potts, refuses a lord's offer of marriage. Her father in anger orders the wedding. The daughter calls for Tom, who challenges the groom. After he wins several contests, the father sanctions their marriage and names Tom his heir.
110	The Knight and Shepherd's Daughter	A knight takes a maid's virginity, and she appeals to the king. The knight tries to bribe her, but she insists on marriage. After they wed, it is revealed that she is of nobility.
111	Crow and Pie	A man woos a maid in a forest. She refuses his offers, warning "the crow shall byte yow." He forces himself on her, and when she protests, he retorts "the pye hathe peckyd yow." The ballad then warns young women to beware of the possibility of rape.
112	The Baffled Knight	A knight meets a maid swimming and proposes intimacy. She convinces him to wait until they reach her father's house. When they do, she locks him out and mocks his gullibility.
113	The Great Silkie of Sule Skerry	A woman mourns that she does not know her son's father. A man appears to reveal he is the father and that he is a silkie, a changeling in the form of a man on land and a seal at sea. In exchange for a purse of gold, he takes the son and predicts she will marry a "gunner" (a harpoonist) whose first shot will kill both him and their son.
114	Johnie Cock	Despite his mother's warning, Johnie goes poaching in woods. He is betrayed to a group of foresters, but fights them off.
115	Robyn and Gandeleyn	While hunting with his servant Gandeleyn, Robyn kills a deer and mysteriously is slain by an arrow himself. Gandeleyn searches for the killer and finds Wrennok the Dane. He challenges Wrennok to a duel with bows and avenges his master's death.
116	Adam Bell, Clim of the Clough, and William of Cloudesly	Three outlaws hide in the forest. William leaves to visit his wife and children and is arrested after being betrayed by an old woman. He is sentenced to hang, but Adam and Clim stage a daring rescue. The outlaws seek the king's pardon, but he refuses until the queen intervenes. To show his prowess as an archer, William shoots an apple from his son's head.
117	A Gest of Robyn Hode	The adventures of Robin Hood are recounted in a ballad of 456 stanzas. The cast includes Little John, and the Sheriff of Nottingham. Covered are Robin's travels, his robberies, his relations with the king and his betrayal and death.
118	Robin Hood and Guy of Gisbourne	Little John and Robin argue, and John leaves in a huff, only to be captured by the Sheriff. Meanwhile, Robin encounters Sir Guy who was hired to kill him. They fight, and Robin is stabbed, but he cuts off Guy's head with his sword. Robin then rescues John, who shoots an arrow through the Sheriff's heart.
119	Robin Hood and the Monk	Robin decides to attend mass and is turned in by a monk he had robbed. Little John, accompanied by Much the miller's son, sets off to rescue Robin. They encounter the monk and kill him for his treachery. John and Much trick the king into giving them letters that enable them to access the prison and rescue Robin.
120	Robin Hood's Death	Feeling ill, Robin goes to get himself bled, but is betrayed by the prioress, who attempts to bleed him to death. Robin realizes what is happening and calls for Little John to save him, but it is too late.
121	Robin Hood and the Potter	Robin demands a toll from a potter, who fights him and wins. Robin buys his pots and trades clothing to go into Nottingham in disguise. He sells the pots, giving some to the Sheriff's wife. She invites him home, where he offers to take the Sheriff to Robin. Robin's men surround and rob the Sheriff in Sherwood Forest, but Robin sets him free because of the wife's hospitality.
122	Robin Hood and the Butcher	Robin meets a butcher and buys his meats. He goes into Nottingham and sells the goods at ridiculously low prices. At the invitation of other butchers, Robin attends a dinner with the Sheriff, who offers to buy some cattle. They ride into Sherwood Forest to see the steeds, and Robin and his men rob the Sheriff of his gold.
123	Robin Hood and the Curtal Friar	Robin is told of a friar who may be a match for Little John. Robin seeks out the friar and finds him by the river. He forces the monk to carry him across, but is thrown off. The two battle for hours, and eventually Robin's men and the friar's dogs enter the fray. After Little John shoots 20 of the dogs, the friar agrees to peace, and Robin invites him to join his band.
124	The Jolly Pinder of Wakefield	Robin, Scarlet, and John overhear a pinder (the townsman charged with impounding stray animals) brag that no one will trespass on Wakefield under his watch. When they approach the pinder, he turns them away. A fight ensues, and the pinder gets the better of things. Impressed, Robin invites him to join his band. The pinder agrees to accept the offer as soon as his present job is done.
125	Robin Hood and Little John	Robin meets John Little, a man seven feet tall, while crossing a narrow bridge. Neither will give way, and the two agree to fight with staffs. Robin is dunked. After he summons his men, Robin invites John to join them. He accepts and is renamed Little John in a whimsical reference to his size.
126	Robin Hood and the Tanner	Arthur the tanner ventures into Sherwood Forest to see the deer. Robin pretends to be a keeper and challenges him. The two fight with staffs for hours. Finally, Robin calls a halt, reveals his identity and summons Little John with his horn. John offers to take over the battle, but Robin praises Arthur's skill, says his hide has been tanned. He invites the tanner to join them, which he does.
127	Robin Hood and the Tinker	A tinker tells Robin he has a warrant from the king for the outlaw Robin Hood and asks his help for a share of the 100-pound bounty. At Robin's urging, they go to Nottingham and visit an inn, where the tinker becomes drunk and falls asleep. Robin takes the warrant and the tinker's money and leaves him with the bill. The tinker catches up with Robin and a fight ensues with the tinker getting the better of it. Robin blows his horn to be rescued by his men, but in admiration offers 100 pounds for the tinker to become one of them.
128	Robin Hood and the Newly Revived	Robin sees a young stranger bring down a deer at 40 yards and offers him a place in his band. The stranger insults Robin, threatening him, and the two engage in a battle of swords. Robin strikes a fierce blow only to have a greater one returned. Impressed, he asks the stranger's identity, and the young man replies he has just killed his father's steward and is seeking refuge in the woods with his uncle, whom some call Robin Hood. Robin names his nephew Scarlet, declaring him second only to Little John.
129	Robin Hood and the Prince of Aragon	The Prince of Aragon, a Turk and an infidel, has encircled London, demanding its princess as his wife, unless three champions can defeat him and his two giants. Robin Hood, Little John and Robin's nephew Will Scadlock take the challenge and succeed, thus gaining pardon. Will marries the princess and reunites with his father, who thought he was dead.
130	Robin Hood and the Scotchman	Robin offers to employ a Scotsman if he can demonstrate his strength. The Scot beats Robin, who declares his opponent the strongest he has ever fought and hires him as a bowman.
131	Robin Hood and the Ranger	A forester stops Robin from killing a deer, and the two fight, first with swords and then with staffs. Robin is beaten and summons his men. The forester joins them, and in celebration they shoot a doe and feast.
132	The Bold Pedlar and Robin Hood	Robin and John chance upon a pedlar. Each wrestles the pedlar and loses. The pedlar tells them he is Gamble Gold, a fugitive for killing a man. Robin declares that if so, then he must be his cousin. In merriment, they go to a tavern to dine and drink.
133	Robin Hood and the Beggar, I	A beggar asks Robin's charity, and they fight. When the beggar wins, Robin trades his horse and clothing for the beggar's rags. Disguised, he goes to Nottingham where he finds three of his band about to be hanged. Robin summons a hundred archers, who drive off the Sheriff and free his men.
134	Robin Hood and the Beggar, II	Robin demands money from a beggar. When he refuses, Robin draws his bow, only to be beaten senseless with the beggar's staff. Three of Robin's men find him and set out to avenge their friend's disgrace. When they catch up with the beggar, he tricks them and escapes.
135	Robin Hood and the Shepherd	Robin meets a shepherd and demands money. The shepherd refuses, and Robin puts up 20 pounds on a fight for the shepherd's bottle and bag. After hours of fighting, the shepherd wins. Robin blows his horn, and Little John shows up to fight the shepherd but gets thrashed as well.
136	Robin Hood's Delight	Robin Hood, Little John, and Will Scarlock meet three keepers in the forest. A fight breaks out, and after six hours the foresters prevail. Robin invites them to a tavern in Nottingham, offering to pay for the wine. They drink for three days and become friends.
137	Robin Hood and the Pedlars	Robin Hood, Little John and Will Scarlet are hunting in Sherwood when they meet three pedlars. They try to stop the pedlars, but after Robin shoots an arrow into one of their packs, a fight ensues. Robin takes a blow to the head and appears to be dead. One of the pedlars administers a healing balsam to Robin who regains consciousness and throws up the balsam.
138	Robin Hood and Allan-a-Dale	Robin notices a young man, Alan-A-Dale, is cheery one day and dejected the next. He learns Alan was to be married, but his love has now been promised to an elderly knight. Robin dons a disguise, interrupts the wedding and with the help of his men, ensures Alan and his lover are married.
139	Robin Hood's Progress to Nottingham	At age 15, Robin falls in with 15 of the King's foresters. He tells them he wants to compete in an archery contest and is taunted. To prove himself, Robin wagers he can kill a deer at a great distance. When he does, the foresters refuse to pay, and he kills them all. Pursued by the people of Nottingham, Robin escapes into the forest.
140	Robin Hood Rescuing Three Squires	An old woman tells Robin her three sons are to be killed for poaching. He meets a beggar who confirms the tale. Exchanging his clothes for the beggar's, Robin goes to Nottingham in disguise, summons his men and rescues the three.
141	Robin Hood Rescuing Will Stutly	Will Stutly, one of Robin's band, is to be hanged for killing two of the Sheriff's men. Robin and his men swear to rescue him. At the gallows, Little John leaps from a bush and unbinds Will. Robin and his band join in and send the Sheriff and his men fleeing.
142	Little John a Begging	Robin sends out Little John disguised as a beggar. Little John meets up with beggars who do not want his company. They fight, and Little John wins. He finds the beggars are carrying hundreds of pounds, which he takes back to Sherwood.
143	Robin Hood and the Bishop	Spying a bishop and his company, Robin fears being captured and hanged. He appeals to an old woman to trade clothes. Disguised, he returns to his men. The old woman is mistaken for Robin and is taken. Robin and his band rescue the woman, take the bishop's money and force him to say a mass for them.
144	Robin Hood and the Bishop of Hereford	The bishop and his company are expected to pass by. Robin and six of his men dress as shepherds and kill a deer. Drawing the bishop's attention, they tell of the killing. The bishop tries to take them to the king, but Robin blows his horn to summon a band of 70. They force the bishop to dine with them, take three hundred pounds and extract a mass (or in a variation, a dance).
145	Robin Hood and Queen Katherine	Robin becomes friends with Queen Katherine. King Henry offers a wager that his archers cannot be excelled, and the queen calls on Robin and his men to take the challenge on her behalf. Under assumed names, Robin's men prevail. They reveal their identities, but the king, having promised not to be angry with the queen's archers, invites Robin to join his court, an offer he declines.
146	Robin Hood's Chase	In a sequel to Child 145, King Henry has a change of heart and pursues Robin through many towns. With the king close behind, Robin has the bright idea to return to London to see the queen and seek an audience with the king. When Henry finally returns, tired and vexed, the queen asks him to pardon Robin and thus the chase ends.
147	Robin Hood's Golden Prize	Disguised as a friar, Robin seeks alms from two priests who pretend they were robbed earlier and have no money. Robin forces them to pray for some, but after an hour, the priests still claim poverty. Robin finds they have 500 pounds in gold, which he takes. Giving the priests 50 pounds each, Robin requires they take oaths of honesty, chastity and charity and lets them go.
148	The Noble Fisherman, or, Robin Hood's Preferment	Passing himself off as a fisherman, Robin is hired to work a widow's ship. His shipmates mock his lack of seamanship, but when a French vessel threatens them, Robin kills all of the attackers with his bow and captures their cargo of gold. Out of admiration, Robin's offer to share the take is turned down, and in response he proposes using the gold to build a refuge for the oppressed.
149	Robin Hood's Birth, Breeding, Valor and Marriage	Robin is the son of a forester who has outshot all the great outlaws of the time. One Christmas, Robin and his mother visit his uncle, a member of the gentry who names Robin his heir and appoints Little John his page. Later, Robin takes Little John to join his band in Sherwood Forest, where he meets and marries Clorinda, queen of the shepherds.
150	Robin Hood and Maid Marian	As the Earl of Huntington, Robin is forced to part from his love, Maid Marian, and take up the life of an outlaw in the forest. Marian goes in search of Robin disguised as a page. When they meet, he too is disguised. They take to swords, and when Robin is wounded, she recognizes his voice. A banquet is held in celebration, and the two live happily ever after.
151	The King's Disguise, and Friendship with Robin Hood	Intrigued by the tales of Robin's exploits, King Richard goes in search of the outlaw disguised as an abbot. When he finds Robin, Richard presents himself as a messenger of the king. He tests Robin's loyalty and when satisfied reveals his identity. The king pardons Robin, who joins the court and regains his noble status.
152	Robin Hood and the Golden Arrow	The Sheriff stages an archery contest to trap Robin. Though forewarned, Robin decides to compete. Dressed in disguise, Robin wins the prize, a golden arrow. At Little John's suggestion, Robin uses an arrow to send a letter to the Sheriff revealing who had won.
153	Robin Hood and the Valiant Knight	The king sends Sir William and 100 bowman to capture Robin. Sir William goes alone to ask the outlaw to surrender, but he refuses. A battle ensues, the knight is killed and Robin takes ill. A monk is called in to let Robin's blood, and he dies.
154	A True Tale of Robin Hood	The Earl of Huntington lives beyond his means and becomes indebted to an abbot. Outlawed, the Earl takes the name Robin Hood. He and his band live by robbing and are cruel to the clergy, kind to the poor. The tale recounts many of the adventures covered in other ballads.
155	Sir Hugh, or, The Jew's Daughter	A boy, Sir Hugh, accidentally kicks his ball into the garden of a home whose owner is Jewish. When the boy goes to fetch it, he is enticed inside by the owner's daughter. She murders him. From beyond the grave, Sir Hugh gives his mother instructions for his burial, asking that a prayer book be placed at his head and a Bible at his feet.
156	Queen Elanor's Confession	Queen Eleanor is dying. She wishes to make her confession but is fearful an English priest might reveal her indiscretions. When she calls for a French priest instead, King Henry guesses the reason and proposes to Earl Marshall that they disguise themselves as French clerics to trick the queen. Eleanor confesses her sins, but the king cannot act because of an oath to the earl.
157	Gude Wallace	Wallace, a Scot, meets a woman who says 15 Englishmen are at the inn looking for him. He tells her he would go there if he had the money, and she gives him 20 shillings. At the inn, he injures the captain and kills the others. After eating, he meets another 15 Englishmen at the door and defeats them as well.
158	Hugh Spencer's Feats in France	Sir Hugh is sent as ambassador to France to ask the king whether there will be peace or war. The answer is war. He defeats the French queen's knight, and then kills scores of the king's guard. Finally, the king asks for peace.
159	Durham Field	While Edward III is at war in France, the young Scottish King David Bruce invades England with a large force. After early successes, he fares badly at Durham field, where he is wounded and captured. Taken to London, David meets Edward who has returned with another prisoner, the King of France (John II).
160	The Knight of Liddesdale	The one stanza that survives mentions the Lord of Liddesdale, William Douglas. Active during the reign of David Bruce, son of Robert the Bruce, Douglas was assassinated by his kinsman and godson, also Lord William Douglas.
161	The Battle of Otterburn	Greatly outnumbered Scottish forces under Sir James Douglas battle the English army under Ralph Neville, 1st Earl of Westmorland and Henry Percy, 1st Earl of Northumberland. Douglas dies, but the Scots prevail.
162	The Hunting of Cheviot (The Ballad of Chevy Chase)	Henry Percy, Earl of Northumberland, leads a large hunting party on the land of Scottish nobleman James Douglas. A bloody battle ensues. The two earn each other's respect, but in the end, both die.
163	The Battle of Harlaw	Highlanders march to Harlaw where they engage in a bloody battle with local armies. The Highland leader is slain, and the locals prevail.
164	King Henry Fifth's Conquest of France	King Henry dispatches a page to collect a tribute of gold owed by the King of France, who instead sends three tennis balls to teach the young English king to play. In response, Henry raises an army and defeats the French.
165	Sir John Butler	Sir John's uncle and his men invade Butler hall and murder him. Lady Butler is in London and dreams her husband's fate. After confirming the death, she seeks justice from the king who refuses to take the lives of three for the death of one.
166	The Rose of England	An allegorical telling of Henry VII's winning of the crown from Richard III. The red rose of Lancaster, Henry VI, is murdered by a white boar, Richard. The seed of the rose, Henry VII gains support of the old eagle, Lord Stanley. A battle ensues, the Battle of Bosworth, the boar is slain, and the red rose flourishes again.
167	Sir Andrew Barton	London merchants complain to King Henry VIII that the Scottish pirate Sir Andrew is ruining their trade. The king dispatches a force under Lord Howard. The pirate's ship is overtaken, and in a fierce battle, Sir Andrew is mortally wounded.
168	Flodden Field	Scotland's James IV declares war on England. Queen Margaret, sister of Henry VIII, tries to dissuade her husband, and Lord Howard backs the queen. Enraged, James vows to punish them when he returns, but the Scots lose 12,000 at the Battle of Flodden Field, and James is slain.
169	Johnie Armstrong	Johnie, a border raider and member of the powerful Armstrong family, accepts a summons to the Scottish court. Despite promising Johnie and his men safety, the king (James V) orders their execution. Armstrong draws his sword and dies fighting.
170	The Death of Queen Jane	Queen Jane, suffering a hard labor, begs for the child to be removed surgically. King Henry fears losing her and refuses. When she falls unconscious, her attendants open her sides to deliver the baby. Jane dies, and many mourn, but none more than the king.
171	Thomas Cromwell	The ballad survives only as a fragment. An unknown party asks the king for Thomas Cromwell's head. Following the king's orders, two earls fetch Thomas, who refuses to give a confession and is hanged.
172	Musselburgh Field	The Scots suffer a catastrophic defeat by Edward VI's forces. The ballad, though historically inaccurate, recounts the Battle of Pinkie Cleugh, the last large-scale encounter between the Scottish and English armies.
173	Mary Hamilton	Mary Hamilton, servant to Queen of the Scots, Mary Stuart, has an affair with the king and becomes pregnant. Out of guilt, she casts her newborn into the sea. The crime is witnessed, and she is condemned to hang.
174	Earl Bothwell	The French Queen, residing at the Scottish court, proposes to marry Lord David Riccio. Jealous, the King of Scotland has Riccio murdered, stabbed with 12 daggers. Several lords vow the King must die. They blow up his chamber with gunpowder and led by Lord Bothwell, hang him from a tree. Anger spreads across Scotland, and the Queen must flee to England.
175	The Rising in the North	The Earls of Westmoreland and Northumberland, suspected of treason, lead a rebellion (over religion as well as the right of Mary, Queen of Scots, to the throne). The earls gather a force of 13,000 rebels but are defeated by a far larger English army.
176	Northumberland Betrayed By Douglas	William Douglas entices the Earl of Northumberland, Thomas Percy, to participate in a shooting match in Scotland. William's sister, Mary, warns Percy that her brother is a traitor. The Earl fails to heed the warning and sets sail with Douglas, who turns him over to the English under Lord Hunsden.
177	The Earl of Westmoreland	After the rebellion's failure, Earl Neville of Westmoreland seeks refuge in Scotland, finding protection in Lord Hume's castle. Realizing he is unsafe, the Earl takes to sea and finally is given refuge by the Spanish Queen, who appoints him head of the army protecting Seville from heathen forces. Victorious, Neville is granted numerous rewards.
178	Captain Car, or, Edom o Gordon	Captain Carr (or Gordon) seeks shelter in the castle of Lord Hamilton, who is away. He demands Lady Hamilton surrender the castle and sleep with him. She refuses and fires upon the invaders. Carr sets the castle afire, killing Lady Hamilton, her three children and the other inhabitants.
179	Rookhope Ryde	Thieves raid Rookhope while authorities are away during the Northern uprising. The residents take up arms, kill four of the thieves and capture eleven others.
180	King James and Brown	Douglas threatens to slay King James, the Prince of Scotland. The Englishman Brown refuses to betray the King and takes the traitor prisoner. Douglas swears loyalty and is pardoned, only to attack Edinborough. Brown defeats Douglas again, and the King names him an earl.
181	The Bonny Earl of Murray	The Earl of Murray, a brave warrior, is slain by the Earl of Huntly, despite the King's orders to bring Murray to the court alive.
182	The Laird O Logie	The King captures young Logie, Queen Margaret's lover. When her pleas for his life are refused, she tricks Logie's guard into releasing him. Margaret and her lover escape and later marry.
183	Willie MacIntosh	William of the Macintosh clan threatens to burn Auchindown castle as revenge for the Earl of Murray's murder. Risking death at the hands of the Earl of Huntly, he succeeds.
184	The Lads of Wamphray	The Johnstones of Wamphray parish raid the Chrictons' stable. Their leader William, known as Galiard, mistakenly steals a blind horse and is captured and hanged. As revenge, William's nephew Will of Kirkhill kills five of the Chrictons and drives the others from their land.
185	Dick o the Cow	Johnnie Armstrong and his brother Willie stage a raid for booty but find nothing of value. Instead, they take three cows from the fool Dick o the Cow and three bed covers from Dick's wife. In retaliation, Dick steals three horses, selling two of them to his master and his master's brother.
186	Kinmont Willie	Despite a truce, the border raider William Armstrong of Kinmont is captured by forces under Lord Scroope and imprisoned. Willie's friends, led by the "bold Buccleuch", stage a daring raid on Carlisle Castle and rescue him.
187	Jock o the Side	Jock (for John) is captured in a raid and is imprisoned at Newcastle Castle. Hobby Noble and five men scale the castle's walls, break down the prison door, and rescue John.
188	Archie o Cawfield	Archie is imprisoned at Dumfries for raiding. His two brothers and eight others rescue him. Pursued by a force of 100, they manage to escape by crossing a flooded river.
189	Hobie Noble	Hobie, an Englishman, flees to Scotland after committing crimes as a raider, including rescuing Jock o the Side. Betrayed by Sims o Maine, Hobie is captured and taken to Carlisle. Rather than confess or like Sims, become a traitor, he chooses to die.
190	Jamie Telfer of the Fair Dodhead	The Captain of Bewcastle raids Fair Dodhead, stealing Jamie's herd of ten cows. In desperation, Jamie runs about the countryside to gather a force to pursue the raiders. Though they suffer some casualties, the avengers badly wound the Captain, take him prisoner, and turn over his 33 cows to Jamie.
191	Hughie Graeme	Sir Hugh of Graham steals the Lord Bishop's horse and is captured. Attempts to ransom him are unsuccessful. From the gallows, Hughie reveals that he committed the crime to avenge the bishop's seduction of his wife.
192	The Lochmaben Harper	On a wager, a blind harper sets out to steal King Henry's brown horse, but on his wife's advice, leaves his mare's newborn foal at home. By good fortune, the harper meets the king who asks to hear some harping. After lulling everyone to sleep, the harper ties the king's horse to his own and sends her home to her foal. The next day the harper cries both his mare and his foal have been stolen. The king promises the harper a better mare and also pays for the foal.
193	The Death of Parcy Reed	Parcy captures the raider Whinton Cosier, whose clan vows revenge. After a long day of hunting with his neighbors, the Halls, Parcy falls asleep. The Halls betray him by disabling his weapons and awaken him just as the Crosiers are approaching. Defenseless, Parcy is brutally maimed.
194	The Laird of Wariston	Laird Wariston abuses his wife (Jean Kincaid). With the help of a nurse, she hires a servant to murder him. After being arrested and tried, Lady Wariston is beheaded.
195	Lord Maxwell's Last Goodnight	Lord Maxwell takes his revenge on the Johnstones. While awaiting execution, he bids adieu to family, friends and places he has known.
196	The Fire of Frendraught	Lady Frendraught (Clan Crichton) invites brothers Lord John and Rothiemay (Clan Gordon) to spend the night at Frendraught Castle, presumably to allay a feud between the families. A fire breaks out in the middle of the night, and the brothers find the door to their chamber locked. Lady Frendraught regrets Lord John must die, but not Rothiemay.
197	James Grant	In a ballad fragment, James Grant is attacked in a feud with other members of Clan Grant who are supported by Clan Gordon. James escapes to the highland hills.
198	Bonny John Seton	Baron John Seton prepares his will, anticipating death as forces from the north and south gather for the Battle of Brig o' Dee. The Highlanders are routed by cannon, Seton is killed, and the Lowlanders despoil his body.
199	The Bonnie House o Airlie	The forces of Argyle attack Airlie Castle, home of James Ogilvy who is away visiting King Charles. Lady Airlie is asked for a kiss in exchange for sparing the castle. When she refuses, the attackers plunder the home.
200	The Gypsy Laddie	A lady forsakes her luxuries to run off with a band of gypsies. Returning home to find his lady gone, the lord tracks her down. He bids her to return, but she refuses.
201	Bessy Bell and Mary Gray	Bessie and Mary build a bower to avoid the plague but are stricken anyway. They hoped to be buried in the churchyard with their noble kin, but since this was not allowed, they were buried in a field.
202	The Battle of Philiphaugh	Sir David leads 3,000 Scots to Philiphaugh. Chancing upon an aged man, he asks where to find Montrose and his army of the north. The man not only leads David to Montrose but gives him the strategy for defeating his 15,000 soldiers. Sir David's army prevails.
203	The Baron of Brackley	Invery comes to Brackley's door and calls for him to come out. With only a few men on hand, Brackley refuses, but his wife Peggy shames him into confronting Invery. Outnumbered, Brackley and his supporters are slain. Brackley's wife rejoices, but his young son vows revenge.
204	Jamie Douglas	A lady laments that her marriage to Lord Douglas was ruined by accusations of adultery. Despite his wife's pleas that the claims are untrue, Douglas sends her away.
205	Loudon Hill, or, Drumclog	Clavers comes upon a superior force at Loudon Hill. His cornet warns of what awaits, but Clavers accuses him of cowardice. He leads an attack anyway, only to be defeated.
206	Bothwell Bridge	Earlston joins the Covenantars at Bothwell Bridge. Monmouth, who heads the English forces, welcomes the Scots but demands they put down their weapons. When they refuse, Monmouth's army attacks, routing the Scots.
207	Lord Delaware	In response to the king's desire for a new tax, Delamere asks to hang all the poor, for better they hang than starve. A Dutch (French) lord suggests Delamere be stabbed for his affront to the king, and the Duke of Devonshire offers to fight on Delamere's behalf. Striking the lord with his sword, Devonshire finds he is wearing the king's armor while he himself is fighting bare. Affirming his allegiance to the church and throne, he too makes a plea for the poor.
208	Lord Derwentwater	The king (George I) sends a letter summoning Lord Derwentwater to London. Understanding the letter's meaning, the lord sheds a tear. His wife urges him to make his will, and he leaves his estate to her and their children. Arriving in London, Derwentwater is declared a traitor for supporting James III. Before being beheaded, he offers the 50 pounds he is carrying to the poor.
209	Geordie	Depending on the variation, Geordie is arrested for killing either a man or the king's deer. When Geordie's lady learns his fate, in most variations she raises the ransom for his release, while in others, Geordie is either beheaded or hanged despite her efforts.
210	Bonnie James Campbell	Bonnie James Campbell leaves on his horse, presumably for battle, but the horse returns home without him. Variants use the name George Campbell. However, the identity of the Campbell referenced remains unclear.
211	Bewick and Graham	Two aging fathers cajole their sons into a fight, even though the young men are best of friends. They fight with swords, and when one mortally wounds the other, the victor falls on his own weapon in grief.
212	The Duke of Athole's Nurse	The Duke's nurse finds her lover has given his heart to another. She sends her seven brothers to a tavern to kill him. When the lover sees the brothers coming, he knows his life is in danger and begs the landlady for help. She obliges, providing a disguise that saves him.
213	Sir James the Rose	Sir James kills a squire and flees. His lover, a nurse, is questioned. At first, she lies, but then inexplicably reveals his hiding place. James is captured and killed, much to his lover's regret.
214	The Braes o Yarrow	Nine noblemen court a lady but she prefers a servant as her lover. Forced to fight, the lover kills or wounds most of his adversaries, only to be stabbed from behind by the last of them. The lady grieves, and in some versions dies of sorrow.
215	Rare Willie Drowned in Yarrow, or, the Water o Gamrie	Willie drowns in the Yarrow, and his lover finds his body. The ballad has many variants, though in most the lover is determined to share Willie's grave.
216	The Mother's Malison, or, Clyde's Water	Against his mother's wishes, Willie sets out to see his lover, May Margaret. He crosses the raging Clyde, only to be turned away by Margaret's mother. On his return, he drowns in the Clyde. Margaret wakens from a dream about Willie and learns he had just been there a short time ago. She sets out in pursuit and also drowns, to sleep with "sweet Willie" in Clyde's water.
217	Broom of the Cowdenknowes; or, Bonny May	A young shepherdess falls in love with a passer-by. She becomes pregnant and is banished from her country. The shepherdess seeks her lover and finds he is a wealthy lord. They marry, but she longs for her homeland and the "bonnie broom" (a Scottish flower).
218	The False Lover Won Back	A young man deserts his lover for a fairer maid who lives far away. His former love follows him from town to town. Trying to get her to return home, he bribes her with gifts. In the end, he falls in love with her again and as a final gift buys her a wedding gown (or ring).
219	The Gardener	A gardener promises to dress a lady in flowers if she will marry him. Not interested, she suggests he wear a wintry outfit of snow, wind and rain.
220	The Bonny Lass of Anglesey	English lords come to court to "dance and win the victory." The king, facing defeat, summons his secret weapon, the bonny lass of Anglesey who out dances them all.
221	Katharine Jaffray	A Scottish lord woos a maid, Katharine Jaffray. A wealthier English lord courts the same lass and wins her family's support. The first lover comes to their wedding backed by a body of armed men. He carries the bride away and in some variations, a bloody fight ensues.
222	Bonny Baby Livingstone	Glenlion abducts Bonny Baby Livingston and takes her to his home in the Highlands. One of Glenlion's sisters helps her send a letter to Johny, her true love, who comes with armed men and takes Baby home. In other variants, her lover arrives to find her dead.
223	Eppie Morrie	Willie and his companions abduct a young woman, Eppie Morrie, who has refused to marry him. After failing to get a minister to administer the vows, he tries to force himself on her, but she fights him off. A band of armed men, led by her lover John Forsyth, arrive to rescue her.
224	The Lady of Arngosk	In a fragment, the Highlandmen come and take away the Lady of Arngosk. After they dress her in a petticoat and silk gown, their leader draws her sword to force her to follow him. She refuses to go with him or any Highland man.
225	Rob Roy	Rob Roy and his 20 men surround a wealthy lady's house and steal her away. A priest marries them without her consent. Rob Roy then bids the lady to be content, telling her of his noble background.
226	Lizie Lindsay	A young man courts Lizzie Lindsay, but neither she nor her parents approve. When he reveals he is a Highland lord, she has a change of heart. They marry, and he makes her lady of his castle.
227	Bonny Lizie Baillie	Lizie leaves Castle Cary to visit her sister. She takes an excursion to the island in Loch Menteith where she meets Duncan Grahame, who courts her. Lizie's parents strongly disapprove because he is a Highlander. After returning home, she runs off with Duncan and they marry.
228	Glasgow Peggie	A young Highlander comes to Glasgow and falls in love with bonny Peggie. Despite her parents' protests, Peggie rides off with him. She soon expresses regrets about giving up the fineries of her home. It is then he reveals he is a wealthy nobleman and wants to make her a lady.
229	Earl Crawford	Lillie marries the Earl and soon bears a son. Jealous, she accuses the Earl of loving the boy more than her. They quarrel, and the Earl sends Lillie and their son to her father's home. Though the father appeals, the Earl bars her return. Lillie dies of a broken heart, and when the Earl learns his wife's fate, he too dies.
230	The Slaughter of the Laird of Mellerstain	In a fragment, John Hately, the Lord of Mellerstain, is slain in a family feud. When her husband's body arrives, his wife staggers at the sight of his blood and wonders if things had been different, would the story of the Lord's murder received more attention.
231	The Earl of Errol	The Earl marries Kate Carnegie. When they fail to produce a child, she proclaims that he is not a man and tells her father to forgo paying her dowry. To disprove the charge, the Earl takes a mistress who in nine months delivers him a son.
232	Richie Story	The Earl of Wigton's youngest daughter falls in love with a footman, Richie Story. Though courted by noblemen, she vows to marry none but Richie even if it means giving up her life of luxury.
233	Andrew Lammie	Annie, a miller's daughter, falls in love with Andrew, Lord Fyvie's trumpeter. Her father bitterly opposes their desire to marry. While Andrew is away, her parents try to dissuade Annie with beatings, and when her brother beats her, she dies.
234	Charlie MacPherson	Charlie arrives in Kinaldie with his men hoping the marry Helen. Instead, he finds Helen is about to wed another in Whitehouse. His party travels to Whitehouse only to find Helen is already a bride. Wishing her well, Charlie leaves with a heavy heart.
235	The Earl of Aboyne	While the Earl of Aboyne is away in London, his wife Margaret receives word that he is courting another. Upon the Lord's return, she welcomes him, not letting on until he asks for a kiss. When she scorns him for his indiscretion, he departs again for London. The bonny Margaret becomes gravely ill and dies, much to her husband's regret.
236	The Laird o Drum	The Lord of Drum woos a poor working girl. Skeptical of his intentions, she sends him to her father, who gives consent. The Lord's brother, however, opposes the union as beneath their bloodline. The Lord replies he is marrying a woman who will "work an(d) win" rather spend.
237	The Duke of Gordon's Daughter	The Duke of Gordon's daughter Jean falls in love with Captain Ogilvie. To stop the match, Gordon tries to have Ogilvie executed, but the King only demotes him. The two marry anyway and live in poverty, until Jean can no longer bear it and returns to her family. Ogilvie inherits an earldom and fetches his wife and children.
238	Glenlogie, or, Jean o Bethelnie	Jeanie, still in her teens, falls in love with Glenlogie, a Gordon who is already promised to wed. Her family urges Jeanie to look elsewhere, but she is smitten. A letter from her father's chaplain changes Glenlogie's mind, and he marries bonnie Jeanie.
239	Lord Saltoun and Auchanachie	Jeanie Gordon loves Auchanachie, but her father forces her to wed the aging but wealthy Lord Saltoun. On their wedding night, she refuses to sleep with her husband. Jeanie's father has the maidens cut off her gown. With that, she faints and dies. Auchanachie, who has just returned from the sea, asks to see where Jeanie lies. After kissing her cold lips, he too is dead.
240	The Rantin Laddie	A young woman bears the bastard child of a ranting laddie. Scorned by friends and family, she sends a letter to the laddie, who turns out to be the Earl of Aboyne. The Earl, learning of the lady's circumstances, dispatches a large force to bring her to the castle as his wife.
241	The Baron o Leys	On a folly as a ranting laddie, the Baron impregnates a girl. She demands he either marry her, pay a fee or lose his head. The Baron's wife learns her husband has had a child and offers to sell her lands and fineries to save him from scorn.
242	The Coble o Cargill	David Drummond, a butler from Cargill, has two mistresses, one in Balathy and the other in Kercock. Jealous, the lover from Balathy bores seven holes in Drummond's coble (a flat-bottomed boat), and he drowns while crossing the River Tay.
243	James Harris (The Daemon Lover)	A man, usually the Devil, returns to his former lover after a long voyage. Learning she has married a ship carpenter and has had a baby boy, he entices her to sail away with him. They are not long at sea when she misses her son. On the horizon, she sees a beautiful hill. Her lover tells her it is heaven, but they are headed in another direction, toward their final destination, hell. The ballad is also known as "The House Carpenter".
244	James Hatley	Sir Fenwick steals the king's jewels and frames James, who is sentenced to hang. The king's daughter steals the prison keys to ask James if he is the thief. She believes his story and arranges a duel between James and Fenwick. Mortally wounded, Fenwick confesses the crime.
245	Young Allan	While drinking with other skippers, Allan brags about his ship's speed. A sizable bet is made, and a race arranged. When a storm breaks out, Allan turns over the helm to a bonny lad, who steers the ship safely to land and wins the hand of Allan's daughter.
246	Redesdale and Wise William	At a drunken gathering, Redesdale brags he can win the fancy of any lady. Wise William places a wager Redesdale cannot gain the favor of his sister. Secretly, William sends a letter to his sister informing her of the bet. When his efforts to woo the sister fail, Redesdale sets fire to her house. Everyone escapes, and Redesdale loses his land.
247	Lady Elspat	Lady Elspat and Sweet William agree to wed, but her mother learns of their plans and has him imprisoned for damaging the castle and stealing her jewels. In a hearing before the Lord Justice, Lady Elspat accuses her mother of lying. The Lord Justice believes her and sets William free so the two can marry.
248	The Grey Cock, or, Saw You My Father?	John comes to his lassie's door when her mother and father are asleep. She lets him in, and they make love. The lassie bids him to stay until the grey cock crows, but he is sent away an hour earlier than expected when the crow mistakes the moon for daylight.
249	Auld Matrons	Willie comes to Annie's door and is let in. When he expresses concern about the old woman he saw sitting by the fire, Annie assures him the woman is harmless. As the two are about to make love, the old woman informs the sheriff that Willie is in bed with his daughter. Willie's brother Lord John comes to the rescue and fights off the sheriff and his men.
250	Henry Martyn [aka Henry Martin]	Three Scottish brothers cast lots to determine who shall take to sea as a pirate. Henry, the youngest, is chosen. He soon encounters an English merchant ship. In the battle that ensues, the English ship is sunk, but Henry suffers a mortal wound.
251	Lang Johnny More	Johnny, who is 14-feet tall, hails from a clan of Scottish giants. On a visit to London, he falls in love with the king's daughter. The king has Johnny drugged and condemns him to death. Johnny is able to send a message to his kin, two of whom come to his rescue. Convinced by the heroics of the giants and their threats, the king allows Johnny and his daughter to wed.
252	The Kitchie-Boy	A lady falls in love with Willie, the kitchen boy. When she makes her feelings known, Willie fears her father will have him hanged. The daughter uses her dowry to have a fine ship built and sends off Willie with the idea of having him return in the guise of a nobleman. The ruse works. Her father accepts Willie as a fit suitor, and the two are wed.
253	Thomas o Yonderdale	Thomas takes Lady Maisry's virginity. Later, he learns she has borne his child. Touched, he promises to marry her upon his return from a voyage. While overseas, Thomas courts another, but in a dream Lady Maisry reminds him of his promise and their son. He returns and at the wedding both prospective brides show up. True to his first love, Thomas sends the other away.
254	Lord William, or, Lord Lundy	Sweet William falls in love with Janet, Lord Lundy's only daughter. While William is overseas, the father learns of the affair and arranges for Janet to marry another. William shows up at the wedding in his finest armor, forces the groom aside and marries her instead.
255	Willie's Fatal Visit	Willie spends the night with Meggie, a maid. She bids the cock to crow at the break of day, but the cock awakens them an hour early. Fearful they have overslept, Willie leaves hurriedly. Along the way, he meets a ghost who rebukes him for traveling in sin and not having said a prayer. The ghost tears Willie apart and hangs his head over Meggie's chair.
256	Alison and Willie	Alison invites Willie to her wedding, but he says he will only come as the groom. She tells him he will never see the day and will soon forget her. Willie rides off, and his heart torn, he dies. When a letter arrives at Alison's wedding telling of Willie's fate, she stops the ceremony and like Willie, succumbs to a broken heart.
257	Burd Isabel and Earl Patrick	Patrick delays again and again on his promise to marry Isabel if she bears him a son. After wishing a hundred evils on himself should he wed another, he marries a duke's daughter anyway. When he comes to take their child, Isabel refuses to give up the boy and reminds Patrick of his vow. As he tries to ride off on his horse, the curse takes effect.
258	Broughty Wa's	While Helen's lover Glenhazlen is visiting her at Broughty Castle, armed Highlanders surround them and carry off the young woman. Distraught, she throws herself in a stream. One of her abductors (though possibly her lover) leaps in after her and drowns. Helen manages to escape, congratulating herself for having learned to swim the waters of Broughty.
259	Lord Thomas Stuart	Lord Stuart marries a young countess and gives her Stratboggie and Aboyne as her morning gift. They ride out to view the lands, and he falls gravely ill and returns home. When no cure works, he asks his father to give his wife her dowry and land, though he expresses regret over leaving no heir. The countess returns home to find him dead.
260	Lord Thomas and Lady Margaret	Lord Thomas goes hunting, and Lady Margaret pursues him. He orders she be taken far away and hunted as a deer. In the woods, Lady Margaret meets a tall young man and begs his protection. In exchange, she marries her rescuer. When Lord Thomas shows up at their house, Lady Margaret poisons him. As he lays dying, Lady Margaret promises him a proper burial, calling it more than he would have done for her.
261	Lady Isabel	Lady Isabel's stepmother accuses Isabel of being her father's "whore" and plans to poison her. Isabel, whose true love is overseas, wishes to escape. While attending church, she meets her real mother who tells Isabel that if she takes the poison, she will sleep in a better place. Isabel follows her mother's advice. As she lays dying, Isabel tells the stepmother that her bed is in the lowest hell while hers is in the high heavens. In the end, the stepmother goes mad.
262	Lord Livingstone	Two squires, Livingston and Seaton, seek the favor of a lady. She chooses Lord Livingston, and the two are wed. Seaton demands a duel, and Livingston is slain. After seven years pass, his wife dies of heartbreak.
263	The New-Slain Knight	A knight spies a maiden sleeping under a hedge and awakens her. He tells her has just seen a dead man in her father's garden. Fearful her lover has been murdered, she asks for a description. The details fit, and she laments she has no father for her child. The knight offers to marry her, but she refuses. The knight then sheds his disguise, reveals he is the lover and declares he is convinced her love is true.
264	The White Fisher	Married only a month, Willie learns a "popish" (Catholic) priest had tricked his wife and is the father of their expected child. When a son is born, his wife tells Willie to cast the babe into the sea. Instead, Willie gives the boy to his own mother. Returning home, he finds his wife in tears over the "white fisher" she has sent to the sea. Willie cheers her, revealing their son is in his mother's care.
265	The Knight's Ghost	A lady learns her husband, a knight, has been killed in battle. Scornful of his men for not fighting harder to protect him, she invites them to the castle, gets them drunk and locks them in the cellar, throwing the keys into the sea. While she sleeps, her husband's ghost appears. He declares his men could not have done more and asks his wife free them. Before departing, the ghost tells her future.
266	John Thomson and the Turk	John Thomson has been fighting the Turks for three years, when his lady comes to visit. Instead of heading home for Scotland, she becomes mistress to a Turkish leader. A year passes before Thomson learns his lady is missing. Disguised as a pilgrim, he is admitted to the Turk's castle, where his wife hides him in the cellar only to betray him. Before he can be hanged, Thomson summons his men, kills the Turk and hangs his wife.
267	The Heir of Linne	The heir of a Scottish lord gambles away his fortune and is reduced to begging. Having learned his lesson, he remembers a letter from his father. The letter reveals that chests of gold are hidden in his former castle. Pretending to beg money from the steward who bought his lands, the heir tricks him into selling them back.
268	The Twa Knights	Two close friends, both knights, make a wager that one of them can seduce the other's wife. After several attempts, he appears to be successful, but the lady sends a niece in her place. Fooled, the squire sleeps with the girl. In the end, the wife proves she has been faithful, and the other knight marries the niece.
269	Lady Diamond	Lady Daisy, the daughter of a cruel king, sleeps with the kitchen boy and becomes pregnant. The king has the lover murdered and has his heart presented to Daisy in a gold cup. When she dies of grief, the king regrets his rage.
270	The Earl of Mar's Daughter	The Earl's daughter promises a golden cage to a dove if he will come home with her. At night, the dove becomes her lover, and she bears seven sons. The daughter refuses to marry until her father threatens to kill the dove. The dove turns into a goshawk and leads a mighty flock of storks and swans to the wedding to rescue the bride.
271	The Lord of Lorn and the Flas Steward	The young Lord of Lorn delights his father with his schoolwork and is sent to France to study. His steward, who promises to care for the son, instead starves him, sells his clothes and sends him off to beg. The steward, who passes himself off as the Lord of Lorn, courts the Duke's daughter. By chance, she meets the real lord, and the truth comes out. The false steward dies a painful death, and the heir of Lorn marries the daughter.
272	The Suffolk Miracle	A maiden of noble birth falls in love with a farmer's son. Her father sends the girl away to live with her uncle, and in her absence, the lover dies of heartbreak. One night, her lover comes to bear her home on a fine steed. As they ride together, she ties a handkerchief around his head. When she returns to her father, he reveals her lover is dead. The lover's grave is dug up, and the handkerchief is found around his skull.
273	King Edward the Fourth and a Tanner of Tamworth	While hunting, King Edward meets a tanner who does not recognize him. The king tries several times to engage the tanner but is rebuffed each time. Finally, the king summons his party of noblemen. At first, the tanner thinks they are thieves, but then realizes the truth and fears for his life. Pleased with the tanner, the king grants him an estate.
274	Our Goodman	Our goodman comes home to find a strange horse. He asks his goodwife, and she says it is not a horse but a cow. Puzzled, he declares he has never seen a cow with a saddle. Each time he returns home, there is a different item and another unlikely explanation. Finally, he finds a man. His wife tells him it is not a man but a milking maid, to which our goodman replies he has never seen a milking maid with a beard.
275	Get Up and Bar the Door	A husband asks his wife to bar the door, but she is busy cooking and refuses. They agree that whoever speaks first must bar the door. Two travelers chance upon the house, and receiving no responses to their greetings, they help themselves to food and drink. When one of the strangers proposes to kiss the wife, the husband protests, and having spoken first, must bar the door.
276	The Friar in the Well	A friar solicits a maiden. She asks for money, and when the friar comes to pay her, she tricks him into falling into a well. The friar asks for help, but she reminds him that St. Francis did not teach friars to seduce maidens. Finally, she pulls him out but refuses to return the money, saying he must pay for fouling the water.
277	The Wife Wrapt in Wether's Skin	Robin has married above his station, and his wife refuses to bake, brew, wash, or wring. Unable to beat her, he strips off a sheep's skin, wraps it around her and thrashes the hide instead. The tact works, and she promises to be a good wife.
278	The Farmer's Curst Wife	The devil comes for a farmer's wife. The farmer welcomes him and expresses hope that the devil and his wife will never part. Once in hell, the woman is as ill behaved as she was at home. Fearful for the others in hell, Satan bundles up the woman and returns her to her husband.
279	The Jolly Beggar	A beggar asks a farmer for lodging and is given food, drink and a place by the fire. In the middle of the night, the farmer's daughter comes to bar the door, and they sleep together. The daughter accuses the beggar of being a nobleman, and when he assures her he is not, she turns him out. In the end, we find he is a lord with 24 knights.
280	The Beggar-Laddie	A nobleman disguised as a beggar convinces a young woman of standing to be his lassie. Traveling from town to town, she feels ashamed. When they arrive at his father's house, to her surprise they are welcomed in. The two wed the next day.
281	The Keach i the Creel	A clerk falls in love with a maiden, but her parents keep her locked up. The clerk has his brother make a ladder with a pulley for lowering a basket (creel) down the chimney. Suspecting someone is with her daughter, the mother sends the husband to look, but he finds the girl pretending to pray. The mother looks for herself and gets caught in the creel. As the brother pulls her up, the wife screams a thief has taken her. The father, tired of the commotion, says he hopes he will keep her.
282	Jock the Leg and the Merry Merchant	A merchant befriends a stranger, unaware that he is the notorious thief Jock the Leg. While on the road, Jock tries to take the merchant's pack, and in a fight, the merchant has the better. Jock summons his bowmen. When the merchant slays five of Jock's men, Jock invites the merchant to join his band. The merchant refuses not only that but also the thief's friendship.
283	The Crafty Farmer	A farmer on his way to pay his rent is overtaken by a highwayman. The farmer tells him his money is safe in his saddle, and when the thief pulls out a pistol, the farmer throws the saddle over a hedge. As the thief goes to fetch it, the farmer steals his horse. Arriving at the landlord's house, the farmer pays his rent of 40 pounds and then finds 600 pounds in the thief's bags.
284	John Dory	John Dory, presumably a pirate, goes to Paris to seek a pardon from the king for him and his men. In return, Dory proposes to defeat the English. Back at sea, Dory encounters an English ship under a Cornish man named Nicholl. A battle ensues, and Dory is captured.
285	The George Aloe and the Sweepstake	Two English merchant ships are bound for Safee. The George Aloe anchors, while the Sweepstakes sails on. The Sweepstakes is attacked by a French ship and its crew thrown overboard. The George Aloe pursues the French ship and avenges the fates of their fellow Englishmen.
286	The Sweet Trinity (The Golden Vanity)	The basic story from the main variants: The Trinity or Vanity has been captured or threatened by a foreign galley, and a cabin boy is called on to rescue her. He asks about payment and is promised gold, land and the captain's daughter, depending on the variant. He then uses an auger to drill holes in the bottom of the enemy vessel and sink it. The ballads vary on the boy's payment and fate.
287	Captain Ward and the Rainbow	Captain Ward, based on the early 17th century English pirate Jack Ward, seeks peace with the king, offering a handsome ransom. The king declares he will not yield to a rover and sends the Rainbow and 500 men to capture Ward. However, the privateer's might proves superior, and the Rainbow returns home to tell the king of their defeat.
288	The Young Earl of Essex's Victory over the Emperor of Germany	Queen Elizabeth dispatches a powerful fleet under the young Earl of Essex to face the vast navy under Germany's Emperor. The Emperor, who is impressed by the English forces, puts his son in command. Victorious, the Earl captures the Emperor's son and refuses a ransom. Instead, he chooses to take the son back to England to stand before the Queen. The tale has no historical basis.
289	The Mermaid	Sailors see a mermaid on a rock with a comb and mirror in hand. Mermaid sightings are an omen foretelling shipwreck, and the sailors lament the families they are leaving behind. In the end, their gallant ship sinks and they drown.
290	The Wylie Wife of the Hie Toun Hie	Over drinks, a young man declares his desire to lie with a particular bonny lassie. He pays the hostler's wife to lure the girl. After he has his way with her, she asks his name. Depending on the version, he tells her he is the earl's son, second son (and therefore landless) or a highland squire. All variants end with their marrying.
291	Child Owlet	Lady Erskine tries to seduce her husband's nephew, Child Owlet, but is refused. Out of revenge, she stabs herself and accuses the nephew of raping her. The husband has Child Owlet torn apart by wild horses.
292	The West Country Damosel's Complaint	A maiden asks her lover William to either marry her or end her life. He cruelly tells her to go live in the woods. After three months, she is exhausted by the experience and begs her sister for alms. The sister, who is apparently her rival, drives the maiden back into the forest, where she lies down and dies.
293	John of Hazelgreen	A man overhears a lady weeping for the love of Sir John. He proposes she marry his eldest son instead, and she refuses. Ignoring her protest, he takes her shopping for fine gown. When they arrive at the man's estate, the son turns out to be Sir John.
294	Dugall Quin	Dugall, a Highlander who appears to be from humble circumstances, courts young Lissie who is of high standing. Despite her father's opposition, she cannot resist him. Assured of her love, Dugal proposes giving her nine mills, one for each of her maids, and making her lady of bonny Garlogie.
295	The Brown Girl	A young man writes to a maid he has courted that he cannot marry her because she is so brown and he favors another of fairer skin. She sends the letter back, telling him she does not care whether he fancies her. Months pass and he writes again to say he is lovesick for her. She visits his bedside and laughing at him, pledges to dance on his grave.
296	Walter Lesly	Walter induces a maiden with drink and kidnaps her. Interested in her mother's money more than her beauty or standing, he proposes to marry the girl. When he falls asleep, she escapes. Barefoot, the girl outruns Walter's men over moss and moor, hill and dale, to reach home safely.
297	Earl Rothes	Lady Ann pursues an adulterous affair with Earl Rothes. Her young brother fails to dissuade her despite promises of a dowry and marriage to a marquis. The earl, threatened by the brother for debasing his sister, gives up the relationship.
298	Young Peggy	Peggy secretly meets her lover, Jamie, against her family's wishes. They run away to get married. Peggy's father gives chase but by the time he catches up the wedding papers are signed.
299	Trooper and Maid	A soldier sleeps with a maiden and the next morning goes to war. She pursues him and begs him to marry her. He replies he will when "cockle-shells grow siller bells."
300	Blancheflour and Jollyflorice	Blancheflour, a maid in the service of the queen, falls in love with young prince Jollyflorice, despite the queen's warning. The queen has her sent off on a wild steed without a bridle. The prince rescues her and proposes marriage.
301	The Queen of Scotland	In the king's absence, the queen tries to seduce Troy Muir. When he turns her down, she attempts to punish Troy by having him lift a stone in her garden where a serpent dwells. A passing maid distracts the snake by cutting off her breast for him. Troy is saved. He marries the girl, and miraculously her breast regrows in time to suckle their child.
302	Young Bearwell	Bearwell and the mayor's daughter fall in love. When she hears false rumors spread about him, the daughter arranges his escape by ship. Courted by others, she yearns for Bearwell and through a messenger, learns he has gained high status in a foreign court.
303	The Holy Nunnery	Willie's parents oppose his relationship with Annie. Vowing never to kiss another, she becomes a nun. For seven years, Willie is lovesick. Hoping to save him, his mother dresses Willie as a lady. When he visits the nunnery, Annie recognizes him but refuses to break her vows.
304	Young Ronald	Ronald, a noble squire, falls in love with the king's daughter. Rejected, he becomes lovesick but returns to promise to fight long and hard for her. She presents a challenge: that Ronald take on a three-headed giant who has been threatening her father. The young squire slays the giant and wins the princess's hand.
305	The Outlaw Murray	The King of Scotland demands homage from Murray who has laid claim to lands in Ettrick Forest. When the king comes with his army to attack the outlaw, Murray and his men beg mercy. The king tells them the only mercy they will get will be the gallows, Murray repeats his plea, saying he won his lands from the enemy. The king relents and in return for Murray's loyalty appoints him sheriff of Ettrick Forest.
