= Dick o the Cow =

Traditional song

Dick o the Cow (Roud 4012, Child 185) is an Anglo-Scottish border ballad. The ballad tells the story of a man who regains his stolen cows.

== Synopsis ==
John Armstrang raids England, but finds only six sheep, which would humiliate him to steal. He asks his companion, Billie, about a man they met; Billie says that he's a simpleton, named Dick o the Cow. They steal his three cows.

Dick gets permission from his lord to go to Liddesdaile for revenge. There, they taunt him. He steals two horses. John chases after him, on horseback, and they fight. Dick fells him and now has three horses. He sells one horse for money and a good milk cow. With his lord's leave, he moves to avoid the Armstrongs.

== See also ==
- List of the Child Ballads
- Scottish mythology
- English folklore
