= Young Johnstone =

Traditional song

Song
- Genre: Border ballad

"Young Johnstone" (Roud 56, Child 88) is an Anglo-Scottish border ballad that exists in several variants. The ballad tells the story of a woman killed either by her brother or lover, depending on the variant.

== Synopsis ==
Several variants open with the heroine's brother and lover drinking together. One of them proposes that they each marry the other's sister. One of them kills the other: often, the brother's reason is that the other has refused to marry his sister but intends to keep her as his mistress.

In one variant, the love seeks refuge with his mother and his sister and is turned away.

In all variants, the surviving man seeks refuge with the heroine, confessing to having killed her brother or her love. She hides him. When his pursuers are gone, he stabs her. She remonstrates, and he promises to get her doctors if she lives out the hour, but she tells him the wound will be mortal before then.

== See also ==
- List of the Child Ballads
- Scottish mythology
- English folklore
