= Lord Thomas Stuart =

Traditional song

Lord Thomas Stuart (Roud 4024, Child 259) is an Anglo-Scottish border ballad.

== Synopsis ==
Thomas Stuart wooes the Countess of Balquhin and gives her, as her morning gift, Strathboggie and Aboyne. She insists on seeing them. They ride off, and he takes ill. He sends her on.

His father asks if anyone can cure him, but he says that every leech has tried. He tells his father to give his wife her dowry and his morning gift, but says it would have been better for her if she had had a son to be his heir.

His wife returns, and seeing the commotion, fears that her lord is dead.

== See also ==
- List of the Child Ballads
