= The Fair Flower of Northumberland =

British ballad

"The Fair Flower of Northumberland" (Roud 25, Child 9) is a folk ballad.

== Synopsis ==
A Scottish knight is imprisoned by the Earl of Northumberland (or another high official). The knight persuades the Earl's daughter, the titular fair flower, to free him, promising to marry her in Scotland. As soon as they reach his home, he tells her to return to Northumberland as he already has a wife and children. She pleads with him to take her as a servant or to kill her, both of which he refuses. She returns to her home, either alone or with an escort hired by the Scottish knight. In some variants, her father or stepmother complains of how easily her love was won, but in all, her mother or father blames the seduction on Scottish treachery and says that she will have gold and lands to get her a husband.

== Commentary ==
There are no variants of this ballad in other languages than English and Scots, though many of the elements have parallels. Parts of it parallel "The Nut-Brown Maid", where the hero tells the heroine that he has nothing to give her, and is plighted to another women, but in that ballad, that is only a test, and he reveals himself as her true and wealthy lover.

Many of the same motifs are found in Child Ballad 48, "Young Andrew".

As an example of the same elements in other traditions, several Serbian and Bulgarian ballads about the epic hero Prince Marko have a fairly similar plot: Marko is imprisoned in an Arab country, but is secretly aided and set free by the daughter of the Arab king in exchange for his promise to take her with him and marry her - a promise that he soon regrets and breaks. In some versions, she then asks him to take her at least as his slave, or else kill her. However, unlike the British ballads, the Balkan versions have Marko actually kill the Arab maiden; his motive is that as an Arab she is dark-skinned, which is considered unattractive, and/or that he is afraid of being mocked by his friends at home for having an Arab wife. He then builds numerous monasteries, churches, fountains, roads and other public facilities in her memory, striving to atone for his sin towards her and God.

== See also ==
- List of the Child Ballads
