= The Keach i the Creel =

Traditional song

The Keach I' the Creel (Roud 120, Child 281), also known as The Ride in the Creel or The Wee Toun Clerk, is an English-language folk song, originating from England and Scotland sometime in the early 1800s.

== Synopsis ==
A young woman tells a man that her parents keep her too close for them to meet. The man has his brother make a ladder and a pulley to hoist a basket (creel) down the chimney; the ladder takes him to the chimney, and riding in the large creel he is lowered into her bedroom. Her mother guesses there is a man in the daughter's bed and sends the father. She hides her lover and persuades her father she was praying. Her mother, still suspicious, goes herself. She trips and is caught ("keach" being catch, "keach i' the creel" being "the catch in the basket" - usually referring to fish caught and stored in a basket slung from the fisherman's hip or shoulder) in the creel and tossed all about in it; the father professes that he's fed up with all of them, for he's had no rest all the night with the goings-on.

== Recordings ==
This ballad has been recorded by:

- Ewan MacColl on The English and Scottish Popular Ballads, vol. 2 (1956)
- Ian Campbell Folk Group on Cock Doth Craw (1968)
- Jean Redpath on Ballad Folk (1977)
- Martin Carthy and Dave Swarbrick on Skin and Bone (1992)
- Eliza Carthy and Nancy Kerr on Shape of Scrape (1995)
- Paul Brady, on Welcome Here Kind Stranger (1978) and The Liberty Tapes (2003)
- Subway to Sally on 1994
- Megson on Contradicshun (2019)

== See also ==
- List of the Child Ballads
