= Kempy Kay =

Traditional song

"Kempy Kay", also known as "King Knapperty" (Roud 32, Child 33) is an English-language folk song.

== Synopsis ==
A deformed suitor woos a hideous maiden, each of whom is described in bawdy detail. Finally, they exchange disgusting gifts, and the match is made.

== See also ==
- List of the Child Ballads
