= Will Stewart and John =

Traditional song

Song by Traditional
- Genre: folk music

Will Stewart and John is an English-language folk song, catalogued as Roud 3973 and Child 107.

== Synopsis ==
Will Stewart and John are brothers; John is the younger and wiser. Will falls sick for the love of the Earl of Mar's daughter. John leaves him, claims to have quarrelled with him, and enters the earl's service. John woos the daughter for his brother and refuses to speak for himself. The daughter agrees to meet with Will and describes how it should be done.

This revives Will, who then matches everything she demanded. Her mother refuses to let the daughter meet with him alone, but he wins a kiss from her. He asks the earl for leave to marry her, and the earl refuses, threatening to beat his daughter. Will says that if he beats her, he will have to fight all his men; John says that if he had to refuse, he might have done so courteously.

Will and John were summoned to parliament at Edinburgh. They meet the earl of Mar there. Will declares his blood is high, he being the king's cousin. The king says the earl hates him more for that but gives him an earldom and makes his brothers lords.

Will takes ill for his love. John dresses as a beggar to get to the lady, but is the stoutest beggar that people have seen. He throws down many beggars on his way. He reaches the lady and tells her that his brother is ill. She agrees to meet Will again and they marry at once. Twelve months later, she has a son. They send word to her father, who demands that he marry her. John says that they will give her back, and the earl agrees that Will shall be the Earl of Mar after him, if he will marry her.

== See also ==
- List of the Child Ballads
