= The Carnal and the Crane =

Ballad for children

"The Carnal and the Crane" (Child 55, Roud 306) is an English Christmas carol. It depicts a conversation between two birds—apparently, although the species of the "carnal" has never been identified with any certainty, though crow is generally assumed.

== Synopsis ==
A carnal tells a crane about the birth of Jesus: that he was born in a stable, of a virgin, and slept in a manger; that the Magi told King Herod of the birth, Herod said that if it were true, the cock on his table would revive and crow, and the cock did so; that Herod ordered the Massacre of the Innocents, that Saint Joseph had to flee to Egypt and beasts worshipped Jesus on the way; that a husbandman's seed were miraculously sown and brought to harvest when Jesus passed, he reported that to Herod, and Herod, assuming that the growth has been natural, pulled back because he would never have been able to catch them if they were three-quarters of the year ahead.

== Variants ==
While no very old manuscripts have been found, internal evidence points to the work being older than the texts. It includes several popular legends of the life of Jesus.

The miraculous restoration of a rooster to life is a common motif in European ballads; it frequently appears in a tale in which an innocent person condemned to death is miraculously saved from death, and in which someone expresses disbelief in that miracle as it was unlikely as the rooster's resurrection. This story, with St. Stephen featuring as the hero, appears in Child Ballad 22, "Saint Stephen and Herod".

== See also ==
- List of the Child Ballads
- List of Christmas carols
- List of folk songs by Roud number
