= Young Peggy =

Traditional song

Young Peggy (Roud 3875, Child 298) is an English-language folk song.

== Plot ==
The title character Peggy is secretly meeting her lover Jamie against the wishes of her family, who call him a loon and a rogue. The two run off together in the middle of the night. Peggy's father gives chase but by the time he catches up with them, they have already signed the wedding papers.

== See also ==
- List of Child Ballads
