= The Young Earl of Essex's Victory over the Emperor of Germany =

Traditional song

Song

The Young Earl of Essex’s Victory Over the Emperor of Germany (Roud 123, Child 288), also known as Queen Elizabeth's Champion or Great Britain's Glory, is an English-language traditional folk song. With variations, the main story tells of an earl who goes to sea and confronts the German ships. The earl defeats the German emperor's son.

== Synopsis ==
The earl takes to sea. In some variants, his love, Nelly, pleads him to stay and reminds him of what happened to Benbow. Soon after departing, the earl comes across the ships of the German emperor. They hail each other, and the earl's proud greeting causes the emperor's son to ask for ships to go against him. They fight, and the earl defeats and capture's the emperor's son. The emperor tries to ransom him back, but the earl insists on bringing him prisoner before the queen.

== See also ==
- List of the Child Ballads
- Scottish mythology
- English folklore
