= Burd Isabel and Earl Patrick =

Traditional song

Burd Isabel and Earl Patrick or Burd Bell (Child 257, Roud 107) is a traditional folk song, framed with explicit warnings about loving above your station.

== Synopsis ==
Burd Isabel, a servant, becomes pregnant. When she bears a son, Earl Patrick, the boy's father, resolves to marry her, but is persuaded not to, by his family. Soon, he marries a duke's daughter. He resolves to bring his son to his home, but first he sends his aunt (or great-aunt) and then goes himself, to the same effect: Burd Isabel refuses to give her son up.

== See also ==
- List of the Child Ballads
