= Jock the Leg and the Merry Merchant =

Traditional song

Jock the Leg and the Merry Merchant (Roud 3856, Child 282), sometimes just called Jock the Leg, is an English-language folk ballad. The ballad tells of a merchant who defends himself from a thief. The story is similar to those of Robin Hood, except that the merchant does not join the band of thieves.

== Synopsis ==
Jock the Leg and a merchant meet. As they come across a tavern-house, Jock tries to get him to pay his way. In the middle of the night, Then Jock wakes him and tells him they should be on their way. The merchant says he cannot go by Barnisdale or Coventry, fearing Jock will rob him. Jock says he will protect him, though he eventually tries to rob the merchant. The two fight until bloody, and Jock persuades him to let him blow his horn. This summons his 24 bowmen. The merchants challenges them. If six bowmen and Jock fight him and are able to get him one foot from his pack, he will give it to them. The merchant grabs the pack, wields a broadsword, and defeats all seven. Jock invites the merchant to have him join them. Refusing to join the "robber-band," the merchant parts, promising to call Jock a thief if they ever meet again.

== Commentary ==
This story matches many Robin Hood ballads, in which Robin meets and fights a stranger. Unlike Robin, Jock's summoning his men with his horn does not end the fray, and the stranger rejects his invitation.

== See also ==
- List of the Child Ballads
- Scottish mythology
- English folklore
