= The Crafty Farmer =

Traditional song

The Crafty Farmer is Child ballad 283, existing in several variants.

== Synopsis ==
A farmer is traveling with a sum of money—sometimes because he must pay his rent for a long period of time, sometimes because he has sold a cow—when he falls in with a highwayman. He either admits to the money, or the highwayman has overheard where he keeps it. The highwayman demands it and the farmer throws the money (in saddlebags or sewed in coat) off the road. The highwayman goes after it, and finds it empty, or filled with straw. The farmer steals the highwayman's horse, and finds valuables in the highwayman's saddlebags.

== See also ==
- List of the Child Ballads
