= Christopher White (ballad) =

English-language folk ballad

"Christopher White" (Roud 3974, Child 108) is an English-language folk ballad.

== Synopsis ==
A maid bemoans the absence of her lover, Christopher White. A merchant offers to marry her instead. She tells him that if she was false to her lover, she would be false to him. He offers more and more until he persuades her. She marries him, sends a letter to her lover with money, and when he comes, runs off with him and much of the merchant's treasure. The merchant laments, but acknowledges that she told him she would be false to him if she were false to her lover.

== See also ==
- List of the Child Ballads
