= Sir Cawline =

Traditional song

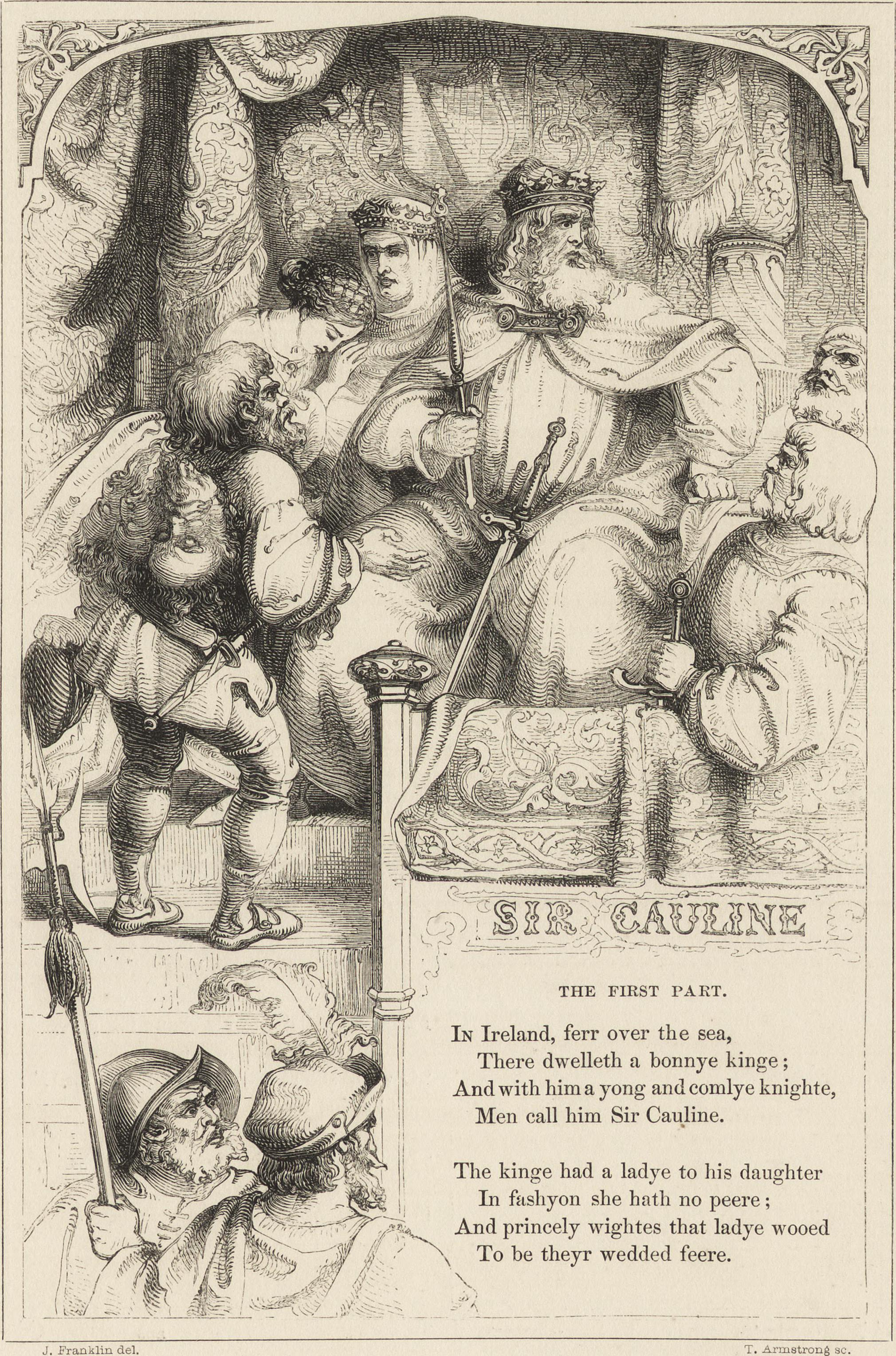
Sir Cauline from The Book of British Ballads (1842)

Sir Cawline (Roud 479, Child 61) is a traditional English-language folk song. A fragmentary form exists in The Percy Folio.

== Synopsis ==
Sir Cawline falls love with the king's daughter and falls ill from it. She tells him that he must do some great deed to be worthy of her: he must keep watch all night on the Eldritch Hill, and the Eldritch (meaning Elf) king has meant that no man has lived through that.

Sir Cawline goes, the king challenges him, and they fight with swords. Sir Cawline strikes him down, and the king's lady pleads for his life. Sir Cawline spares him but brings back his eldritch sword as proof.

In some variants, the king agrees to the marriage at this point.

In others, a giant demands the princess, and Sir Cawline must fight him, using the eldritch sword. The king agrees to the marriage, but a false steward releases a lion to try to kill him, and Sir Cawline must kill it. Then the marriage is performed, and Sir Cawline and the princess have fifteen sons.

== Variants ==
There are noteworthy parallels between this tale and the romance, The History of Sir Eger, Sir Graham, and Sir Gray-steel.

== See also ==
- List of the Child Ballads
