= Judas (ballad) =

13th century English ballad

"Judas" (Roud 3964, Child 23) is one of the oldest surviving English folk ballads, dating back to at least the 13th century. Francis Child numbered it No. 23 in his collection.

== Synopsis ==
Jesus gives Judas 30 pieces of silver to buy food for the Apostles; on his way to the market, Judas is waylaid by his sister, who lulls him to sleep and steals the money. Unwilling to confess his loss, Judas sells Christ to the Romans for the same amount.

== See also ==
- List of the Child Ballads
