= The Queen of Scotland =

Traditional song

The Queen of Scotland (Child ballad 301, Roud number 3878) is a folk song.

== Synopsis ==
The Queen of Scotland tries to lure Troy Muir to her bed. When she fails, she directs him to lift a stone in her garden, and a hungry snake emerges. A woman cut off her breast to appease the beast, and the wound healed within an hour. Troy marries her. Nine months later, she bears a son, and her breast was restored.

== See also ==
- List of the Child Ballads
