= The Twa Knights =

The Twa Knights is a traditional Scottish ballad. It was collected by Francis James Child as Child ballad number 268. It is highly possible that the ballad was popularly unknown in Scotland, and only known through print. It has since been given the Roud number of 303.

== Synopsis ==
The story belongs to the Aarne-Thompson Type 882: the wager on the wife's chastity.

It starts with two best friends, or "brothers sworn": one a knight, and the other a squire. They begin talking about women, and the unwed squire dourly declares that there cannot be more than nine good women in the world. The knight declares that he is lucky, for his wife is one of them. To test the truth of this claim, the squire suggests a plan where the knight goes off to sea for six months. He wagers his life that he will be able to gain the love of the lady before six months have passed. The knight insists that they lengthen the period to nine months, and then wagers all his lands on his wife's faithfulness.

Once the knight has left, the squire tries at once to win the love of the "gay lady". At first approaches her directly, but she spurns his advances. Next the squire wins the aid of his foster-mother with "fifty guineas and three." The foster-mother fakes care for the lady and is able to convince her to send all of her servants out to work the fields. Once the house is empty, the foster-mother lulls the gay lady to sleep and then leaves. The scheming old woman delivers all the keys to the house to the young squire, who goes in and wakes the lady in her bedchamber. He insists that they make love, but the knight's wife spurns him, saying that it would be a sin to sully her husband's bed. Instead, she agrees that she will come to his bed the next day.

The next day, the gay lady sends her niece, Maisry, to the squire in her place. The squire is unable to detect the deception and sleeps with the girl, taking her ring and her ring-finger as tokens of the night.

The knight returns after the agreed time has ended, and is greeted by the squire. The squire insists that he has won the knight's lands and shows the finger as proof. The knight, distraught, goes to punish his wife. When he gets to the castle, however, the lady is able to show him that her hand is whole and tell to him the plot that saved her chastity. The knight summons both Maisry and the squire, and gives Maisry the choice of whether to stab her lover or wed him. After some thought, Maisry decides to marry the squire, and the ballad ends with a nod to her wisdom.

== Parallels ==
Within the Child collection, the story bears remarkable similarity to "Redesdale and Wise William," which is ballad number 246. This version focuses on two friends, Redesdale and Wise William, who wager on the chastity of William's sister. Redesdale bets with his lands, and William with his life. The sister spurns all advances, even when Redesdale burns down her house. Redesdale loses the bet and pays happily, convinced of the sister's goodness. Despite the differences of ending and the distinction of sister rather than wife, the tales are obviously related and both fit within the Aarne-Thompson Type 882.

Outside of the collection, a parallel story and possible source is found in many versions of the Greek tale, "Maurianos and His Sister." Some scholars have even compared it to Shakespeare's Cymbeline.

== Language ==
Like a far more famous poem from the same period, Tae a Moose, "The Twa Knights" is written in the Scots language. This can be easily observed from the title, which uses the word "Twa" instead of the English "Two." Here is a sample of the original ballad along with an English translation. The section comes near the beginning of the song, when the wager is first being made.

‘There’s nae gude women,’ the squire did say,
‘Into this place but nine;’
‘O well falls me,’ the knight replied,
‘For ane o them is mine.’

‘Ye say your lady’s a gude woman,
But I say she is nane;
I think that I could gain her love
Ere six months they are gane.

‘If ye will gang six months away,
And sail upon the faem,
Then I will gain your lady’s love
Before that ye come hame.’

‘O I’ll gang till a far countrie,
And far beyond the faem,
And ye winna gain my lady’s love
Whan nine lang months are gane.’

'There's no good women,' the squire did say,
'In this place but nine;'
‘O well falls me,’ the knight replied,
‘For one of them is mine.’

‘Ye say your lady’s a good woman,
But I say she is none;
I think that I could gain her love
Before six months are gone.

‘If ye will go six months away,
And sail upon the foam,
Then I will gain your lady’s love
Before that ye come home.’

‘O I’ll go to a far country,
And far beyond the foam,
And ye will not gain my lady’s love
Whan nine long months are gone.’
