= The Earl of Westmorland (ballad) =

The Earl of Westmorland (ballad) or "The Earle of Westmorlande" is a Scottish ballad, catalogued as Child Ballad 177 and with a Roud Index number of 4007. It is related to the events in the ballads "The Rising in the North" (Child Ballad 175) and "Northumberland betrayed by Douglas" (Child Ballad 176). The ballad opens with the following verse:

How long shall fortune faile me now,
And keepe me heare in deadlye dreade?
How long shall I in bale abide,
In misery my life to leade?

== Synopsis ==
The ballad discusses the failure of the Rising of the North, in which in November 1569, the earls of Northumberland and Charles Neville, 6th Earl of Westmorland had fought to reestablish the Catholic religion and sought to install Mary Stuart as the successor to Elizabeth I on the English throne. Convinced that they had the support of the then pope, Pius V, and the Spanish crown in the matter - a theme which emerges in the ballad - they involved 7,000 to 8,000 of their tenants in the fight.

After the failure of the battle, the ballad recounts the flight of the eponymous Earl of Westmorland to Hume castle. After a brief period at Hume castle, Westmorland flees once more, before finding favour with the Queen of Seville. The ballad ends on a positive note as noble Nevill says that he will be the Queen’s champion.

== See also ==
- The Rising of the North
- Charles Neville, 6th Earl of Westmorland
- The Child Ballads
- Folk music
