= Young Ronald =

Traditional song

"Young Ronald" (Roud 3914, Child 304) is a traditional English-language folk ballad.

== Synopsis ==
Young Ronald falls in love with the daughter of the King of Linn. She tells him she's too young, his mother tells him that she's refused many, and Ronald takes to his bed. His father weeps for his son's illness, and Ronald rouses himself, to ride back to the princess. She tells him that her father is going against a giant, and she wants him to be among the knights, well-dressed, and to take a magical ring that will stop bleeding among any of his men who are wounded, and keep him from losing blood. When he tells his father, his father gives him a hundred men. When the three-headed giant appears, the king promises his daughter and a third of his lands to whoever faces it. Ronald kills it, marries the daughter, and becomes the king's heir.

== See also ==
- List of the Child Ballads
