= Young Andrew =

Traditional song

- Ballad by Unknown
- Catalogue: Child Ballad 48
- Text: by unknown

"Young Andrew" (Roud 6740, Child 48) is a traditional folk song.

== Synopsis ==
Andrew seduces Helen and tells her he will fulfill his promise to marry her only if she brings him her father's gold. She does. He robs her not only of it but all her clothing. She goes home, naked. Her father is furious. Her heart breaks, killing her, and her father regrets it. Meanwhile, Andrew encountered a wolf in the woods, and it killed him; the gold still lies by his body.

== Variants ==
This ballad contains motifs from both "Lady Isabel and the Elf-Knight" (Child 4) and "The Fair Flower of Northumberland" (Child 9).

This tale is found in German, Polish, and Danish variants.

== See also ==
- List of the Child Ballads
