= Glenlogie =

Traditional song

Glenlogie (Roud 101, Child 238, also called Bonnie Jeannie o Bethelnie) is an English-language folk song, either from Scotland or from the Anglo-Scottish borders.

== Synopsis ==
Jeannie, fifteen, sixteen or seventeen depending on which variant is counting, but clearly the “flower o’ them all”, sees Glenlogie (a.k.a. John Gordon) at a banquet (inevitable since he has been prancing around town showing off all weekend) and falls in love. He politely declines the offer and rides away to some battlefield. Various attempts to persuade her that he's unsuitable for her, either by offering another match or by pointing out the disparity of their stations, are unavailing. She takes to her bed in distress. Her father's literate chaplain writes a pointed letter to Glenlogie scolding him for causing the young woman's (apparently severe to the point of medical danger) distress. After a bit of posturing for his mates (“Huh. Women!”) Glenlogie has a conscience attack and rides back to see Jeannie at Banchory. He pretends he's there to provide medical expertise but she's not having it, explaining that he is a dolt and the pain is in her heart. He agrees to marry her and does.
