= Earl Rothes =

Traditional song

Earl Rothes (Roud 4025, Child 297) is an English-language folk song. Child offers no comment on the ballad beyond its basic story, listing it among the final ballads in a five-volume work that covered 305 of the form.

== Synopsis ==
Lady Ann romantically pursues Earl Rothes, even though he is married. The lady's young brother, unhappy with her behavior, tries to get her to give up the adulterous affair by offering to pay her dowry and arrange a marriage with a marquis. She refuses and chooses to stay with the earl until their child is born. The brother threatens the earl and vows to thrust a sword through him as soon as he is old enough to carry a sword. The story ends with the earl leaving Lady Ann.

== See also ==
- List of the Child Ballads
