= Lady Elspat =

Traditional song

Lady Elspat (Roud 4023, Child 247) is an English-language folk song.

== Synopsis ==
Elspat agrees to meet with Sweet William, but her brother's page overhears them and tells her mother, who imprisons them. When the justice comes to town, the mother accuses him of breaking into her castle and robbing her. Elspat tells that he and she are in love, and her mother objects because William has no great lands. The justice frees William, tells them that William is his oldest sister's son, and gives them as much land as a horse of his can ride about in a day.

== See also ==
- The Bent Sae Brown
