= Hugh Spencer's Feats in France =

Ballad for children

Hugh Spencer's Feats in France is Child Ballad 158. It is Roud number 3997.

== Synopsis ==
Sir Hugh is sent as ambassador to France to ask the king whether there will be peace or war. The answer is war. He defeats the French queen's knight, and then kills scores of the king's guard. Finally, the king asks for peace.
