= The Bent Sae Brown =

Traditional song

The Bent Sae Brown (Roud 3322, Child 71) is an English-language folk song.

== Synopsis ==
Willie crosses land and sea to his love Annie. She tries to turn him away: her parents and brothers want her never to meet him. He tells her to cover her eyes and carry him to bed, so she can swear that she did not see him come in, and he never trod in her bower. Her mother sends her sons to find him. Two, when they fail, will go back to bed; the third says they should wait in "the bent sae brown" for him.

Willie takes his horse, though Annie is afraid because of her brothers. They attack him, and he fights and kills them all.

Their mother goes to court; Annie follows and arrives at the same time. The mother tells the king that one of his knights robbed her. The king knows it can only be Willie. The mother accuses him of breaking into her house, robbing her, making Annie a whore, and killing her sons. Annie declares he had done none of it but kill her sons, and they were in armor while Willie was not. The king agrees to pardon Willie if Annie will kiss him. She does so, and she and Willie go singing home.

== Variants ==
This appears to be derived from Clerk Saunders and another ballad, which does not exist separately in English, but is common in Danish and Swedish.

== See also ==
- Lady Elspat
