= The Duke of Gordon's Daughter =

Traditional song

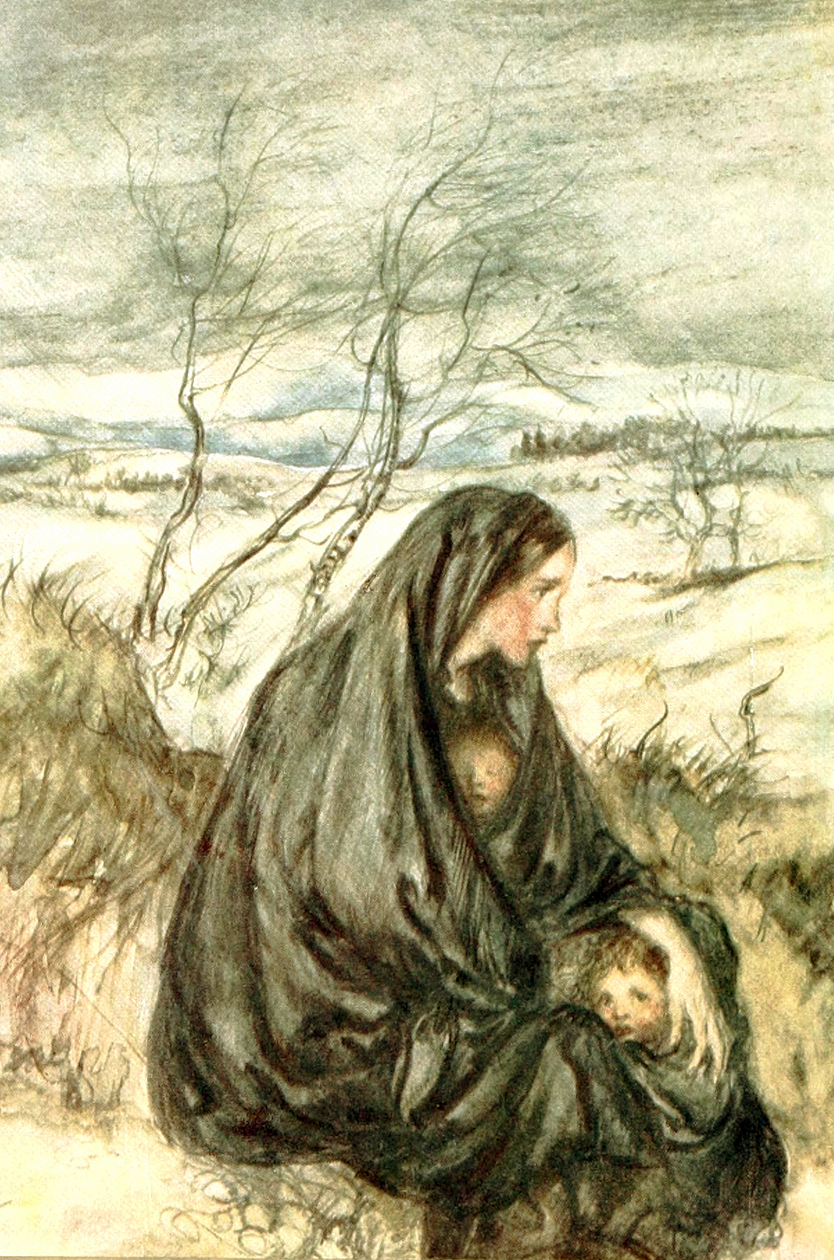
Illustration by Arthur Rackham

The Duke of Gordon's Daughter is #237 of the Child Ballads (Roud 342), the collection of 305 ballads from England and Scotland, and their American variants, collected by Francis James Child in the late nineteenth century. The collection was published as The English and Scottish Popular Ballads between 1882 and 1898 by Houghton Mifflin in ten volumes and later reissued in a five volume edition.

== Synopsis ==
Lady Jean falls in love with Captain Ogilvie and runs away with him. The duke tries to have him executed, but the king consents only to have him demoted. Lady Jean finds following after him in poverty, with children, unbearable and goes back to her family, where she is welcomed. Then Captain Ogilvie inherits an earldom. He goes to get his wife and children. The duke would make him welcome, but he refuses to step inside, only to fetch away Jean and the children.
