= Robyn and Gandeleyn =

15th-century English ballad

Robyn and Gandeleyn is an English ballad. The poem is in Sloane Manuscript 2593, a document of lyrics and carols which dates from around 1450. It was first printed by Joseph Ritson in his 1790 collection Ancient Songs. It was later republished in the second half of the 19th century in an anthology of traditional English and Scottish ballads by Francis James Child known as the Child Ballads, where it is Child Ballad 115. Child also divided the continuous text into seventeen stanzas.

The ballad has attracted interest from scholars of Robin Hood due to the similarity of Robyn's name and the involvement of both precise archery and a dangerous forest as motifs. Despite this similarity, Child and other scholars generally believe that the ballad is not directly connected to Robin Hood's legend. If it really is a reference to Robin Hood, it would be one of the earliest attested stories, along with Robin Hood and the Monk.

== Plot ==
Robyn lyth in green wode bowndyn
I herde a carpyng of a clerk
Al at yone wodes end
Of gode Robyn and Gandeleyn
Was there non other gynge

— Robyn and Gandeleyn, Stanza 1

Robyn kills a deer, but is then shot and killed by an arrow. His servant Gandeleyn looks about for the killer and finds Wrennok of Donne, a young archer (described as a "little boy"). They exchange words, and Gandeleyn says they shall shoot at a mark of each other's hearts. Wrennok fires first but his shot misses. Gandeleyn fires second and cleaves his heart in two, killing Wrennok. The ballad concludes with Gandeleyn declaring Wrennok cannot boast of killing both Robyn and his servant.

== Analysis ==
In general, most scholars believe the Robyn in this ballad to be unrelated to the more famous Robin Hood. There appear to be more differences than similarities between Robyn and Gandeleyn and Robin and Little John. Despite the belief it is unlikely to be directly related, the ballad is often included in collections of Robin Hood literature due to being a relevant example of folklore of perceptions of the medieval greenwood as a place of sudden violence and duels over affairs of honor.

Child's division into stanzas is generally thought to work well enough. The work largely has a rhyme scheme of ABCB, also known as a ballad stanza, although there are several six-line stanzas that integrate awkwardly. The work may have been recited rather than sung, and thus is closer to a poem than a song. Transcription errors, such as a presumably accidental repetition of two lines, leads to suspicion that the Sloane manuscript 2593 was copied hastily and potentially inaccurately, but any differences with an older, lost version can only be speculated on.

Other opinions have been offered as well, often suggesting that the Robyn described may have been a poacher and thus the ballad was about poaching. A thin possibility holds out a connection to The Tale of Gamelyn, a story found in some manuscripts that included The Canterbury Tales, but there is nothing to connect Gamelyn and Gandeleyn aside from their similar names. The author Robert Graves offered the eccentric view that the ballad was really about birds, and described the New Year's hunting of a wren (=Wrennok?) in vengeance for a robin (=Robyn?) murdered in midsummer.
