= Young Waters =

Traditional song

Song
- Genre: Ballad

"Young Waters" (Roud 2860, Child 94) is an English-language folk song.

== Synopsis ==
The queen sees Young Waters ride to court. A clever lord asks her to name the comeliest man in the whole company (at court), and her answer is 'Young Waters' is the fairest face that ever my eyes did see'. The king is angry that she did not except him from that declaration. She tries to appease him, but the king throws Young Waters in prison and executes him.

== Commentary ==
The ballad is often supposed to be based on a historical occurrence, but no such event has been located that matches it.

A very similar Scandinavian ballad names King Magnus Ladulås and his wife Helvig as the king and queen. Folke Lovmandson finds favor with many ladies of court, especially the queen; a page stirs the king's suspicion; the innocent knight is rolled down the hill in a barrel set with knives.
