= Earl Crawford =

Traditional song

Earl Crawford (Roud 3880, Child 229) is an English-language folk song.

== Synopsis ==
Earl and Lillie Crawford, a married couple, had a son. Lillie began to complain that Earl spent more time doting upon their son more than he does her. He becomes angry when he hears this, and he sends his wife to live with her father. Lillie's father appeals, but Earl is steadfast. Eral says he will not take Lillie back into his home. When Lillie received this news it is said that she died of heartache. Earl then hears of his wife's passing and dies of heartache as well. Earl and Lillie's son is left all alone.
