= Jellon Grame =

Traditional song

Jellon Grame is a murder ballad, listed as Child ballad number 90.

== Synopsis ==
A woman goes to the greenwood to plead with her lover. When he threatens to kill her, she pleads for her baby's life. He cuts her open and takes out the baby, raising it as his sister's son. But one day, when his son wants to know why his mother never sees him, he tells the truth, pointing out the specific tree as her grave. His son kills him on the spot.

== Variants ==
Child ballad 89 Fause Foodrage has affinities to this ballad.
