= The Knight's Ghost =

Traditional song

The Knight's Ghost (Roud 3889, Child 265) is a traditional English-language folk ballad. It tells the story of a woman who learns that her husband has died in battle, after which she locks his men in a cellar and throws the keys in the sea. Her husband's ghost appears to ask that she release his men, assuring her they fought bravely. Francis Child drew the ballad from Buchan's Ballads of the North of Scotland.

== Synopsis ==
A woman goes to bring her son to the shore to greet her husband, but she receives news that he has been killed in Dunfermling. She invites his men to the castle to drink and takes them down 53 steps to the cellar. She gets them drunk, locks them in the cellar, and throws the keys into the sea. That night her husband's ghost appears at the foot of her bed with the keys and tells her to unlock the cellar. He says his men could not have fought harder for him, wading in red blood to the knee. She asks him when she will die, but he tells her that he has no more power than God has granted him. He assures her she will go to heaven, but before she dies she will remarry to a greater knight than he. They will have nine children: six daughters, and three sons who will fight for king and country. One son will be a duke, the second a knight, the third a laird.

== See also ==
- Scottish mythology
- English folklore
