= Lord Delaware (ballad) =

Folk song

Lord Delaware (also known as "Lord Delamere", "The Long-armed Duke", or "Devonshire's Noble Duel With Lord Danby") is a traditional ballad listed by Thomas Lyle in his Ancient Ballads and Songs. While the author and origins of the song are unknown, Lyle mentions that it has been recognized since the early 17th century. He further speculates that the song is tribute to Sir Thomas De la Mare (circa 1377). It has a Roud index number of 88.

== Synopsis ==
In response to the king's desire for a new tax, Delamere asks to hang all the poor, for better they hang than starve. A Dutch (French) lord suggests Delamere be stabbed for his affront to the king, and the Duke of Devonshire offers to fight on Delamere's behalf. Striking the lord with his sword, Devonshire finds he is wearing the king's armor while he himself is fighting bare. Affirming his allegiance to the church and throne, he too makes a plea for the poor.
