= Auld Matrons =

Traditional song

Auld Matrons (Roud 3915, Child 249) is a traditional English-language folk ballad.

== Synopsis ==
Willie comes to his love, Annie, and she urges him to come to bed. He is wary of the auld Matrons, sitting by the fire, but Annie says she never moves. As soon as they're gone, auld Matrons wakes the sheriff with the news that his daughter's abed with a lover. The sheriff rouses his men. Annie hears them coming and wakes Willie. After they exchange arrows, Willie blows his horn, summoning his brother, John, who wounds and kills many of the men. Willie curses auld Matrons.
