= The Rantin Laddie =

Traditional song

The (Bonnie) Rantin' Laddie or Lord Aboyne (Child # 240, Roud # 103) is a traditional Scottish folk ballad telling of the valiant rescue of his lover by a noble Highland lord.

== Synopsis ==
The singer tells how she has a love affair with Lord Aboyne (the Rantin' Laddie) but turns down the opportunity to marry him. It transpires that he has got her pregnant and now she must sit in the hall nursing her baby, scorned by family, friends and even servants. However, the kitchen boy takes pity on her and agrees to take a letter to her lover. When Lord Aboyne receives the news he is both gladdened to hear from her but also furious about her mistreatment. He assembles a force of five hundred armed men on horseback and marches across the Highlands to take her back to Castle Aboyne where she will be cared for as "his ain dear lady". Some versions end with a warning to girls about Lowland men who will be false but, instead, to choose a Highland laddie, who will be prepared to do battle for their lovers like the hero of this ballad.

== Lyrics ==
Aft hae I played at the cards and the dice
Wi' my ain dear rantin' laddie;
But noo I maun sit in my father's kitchen nook,
And sing baloo to my bastard bairnie.

My father dear he knows me not,
My mother's quite forgot me;
My frien's and relations they a' slight me,
And the servants they do hate me.

Gin I had but ane o' my father's merry men,
As aftimes I've had many,
That wad rin on to the gates o'Aboyne
Wi'a letter to my rantin' laddie.

Is your love a laird, or is he a lord,
Or is he but a caddie,
That ye sae aft call on his name,
Your own dear rantin' laddie ?

My love's nae a laird, nor is he a lord,
Nor is he but a caddie;
But he's earl ower a' the lands o' Aboyne,
He's my own dear rantin' laddie.

Ye sall hae nane o' your father's merry men,
As afttimes ye've had many,
That will rin on to the gates o' Aboyne,
Wi' a letter to your rantin' laddie.

Oh, where will I get a bonnie wee lad
That will carry a letter cannie,
That will rin on to the gate o' Aboyne
Wi' a letter to my rantin' laddie?

It's here am I, a bonnie wee lad
That will carry a letter cannie,
That will rin on to the gate o' Aboyne
Wi' a letter to your rantin' laddie.

As he gang up by bonnie Deeside
The birks they were bloomin' bonnie
And there he spied the Earl o' Aboyne
Doon amang the bushes sae bonnie.

Fan he lookit the letter on,
And oh but he was sorry,
Oh they hae been cruel, and they've been unkind,
To my ain dear rantin' lassie.

Her father dear he knows her not,
Her mother's quite forgot her;
Her frien's and relations they a' slight her,
And the servants they do hate her.

But I will raise an hundred men,
And oh but they'll shine bonnie;
And I'll mount them all on milk-white steeds,
To bring home my rantin' lassie.

As they rode down through Buchanshire,
And Buchanhire shone bonnie,
Rejoice, rejoice, ye Buchan maids a',
Rejoice and be na sorry.

Gin ye lay your love on a lowland lad,
He'll do all he can to slight ye;
Gin ye lay your love on a highland lad,
He'll do all he can to raise you.

== Recordings ==
- Ewan MacColl on The English And Scottish Popular Ballads: Vol. 1 - Child Ballads
- Alan Lomax on Folk Songs of England, Ireland, Scotland & Wales: Vol. 2
- Jean Redpath on First Flight (1989)
- Gerda Stevenson on the BBC's Robert Burns website
- Gordon Bok and Cindy Kallet on Neighbors
