= Alison and Willie =

Traditional song

Alison and Willie (Child 256, Roud 245) is a folk song, which is fragmentary in form.

== Synopsis ==
Willie is in love with Alison. She asks him to her wedding; he says only if he is the bridegroom; she declares that will never be and he will forget her. He rides on, thinking only of her, sees animals, where a knight can not catch one, and realizes that he will never win her. His heart breaks.

The text breaks off.

Alison receives a letter, calls off the wedding, and dies.
