= Lord Ingram and Chiel Wyet =

Traditional song

Lord Ingram and Chiel Wyet (Roud 46, Child 66) is an English-language folk song.

== Synopsis ==
Lord Ingram and Chiel Wyet are brothers who fall in love with the same woman, Maisry. She falls in love with Wyet and becomes pregnant by him. Her father arranges the marriage to Lord Ingram. At the wedding, he learns of the baby; he may offer to claim the baby as his own, and she refuses, or he refuses. Lord Ingram and Chiel Wyet kill each other. Lady Maisry goes mad, resolving to beg, or go on pilgrimage, until she dies, and more for Lord Ingram than Chiel Wyet.
