= Redesdale and Wise William =

Traditional song

Redesdale and Wise William (Roud 243, Child 246) is an English-language folk ballad. The ballad tells of a man who wagers and loses his lands over an attempt to win a woman's affection.

== Synopsis ==
While "drinking wine" and having "an unruly time", Redesdale tells William he can win the love of any lady. William rashly says his sister will not give him her favor, and bets his head against Redesdale's lands. Redesdale throws him into prison, but he writes a letter and sends it to his sister. Redesdale's attempt to woo her are unsuccessful even at getting a glimpse of her. When he sets the house afire, in different variants, the women escape or a shower puts outs the blaze. Redesdale admits defeat, frees William, and gives him his lands.
