= Northumberland Betrayed By Douglas =

Traditional song

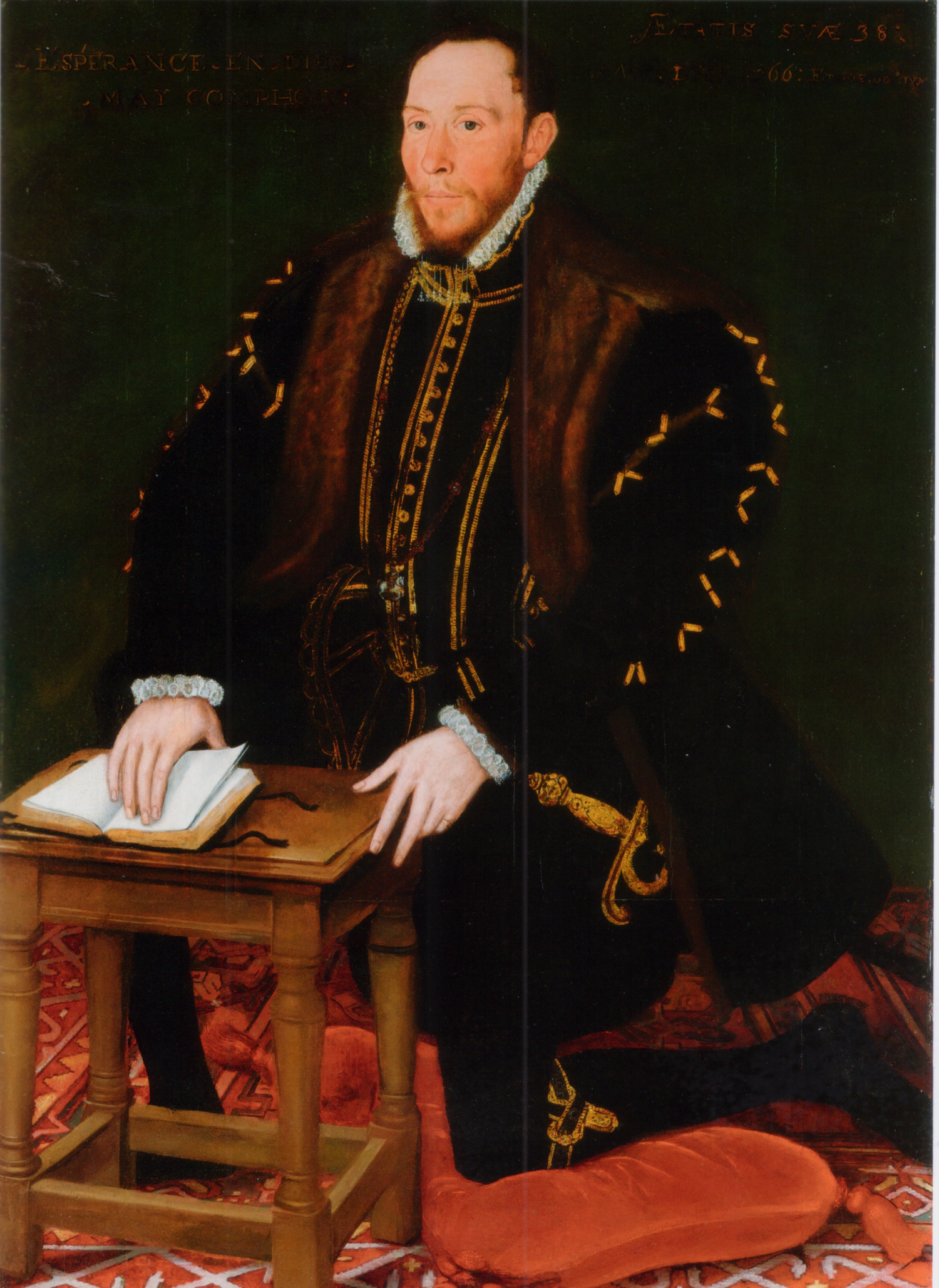
- Northumberland Betrayed By Douglas, a ballad which centres on Thomas Percy, 7th Earl of Northumberland, and his escape with his wife, to Scotland

Song
- Published: c. 1765
- Songwriter(s): Unknown

Northumberland Betrayed By Douglas (also Northumberland Betrayed by Dowglas) is an English-language folk song, catalogued as Child ballad 176 and Roud Folk Song Index number 4006. It tells of the Seventh Earl of Northumberland fleeing to Scotland.

== Synopsis ==
The Earl of Northumberland, Thomas Percy, escapes to Scotland and is taken into custody. Despite his protestations of virtue, he is passed from hand to hand, ending in the custody of Douglas. Earl Percy sets sail, with the mindset that he will be freed, but instead ends up under the control of Lord Hunsden.
