= Border ballad =

Song genre from the Anglo-Scottish border

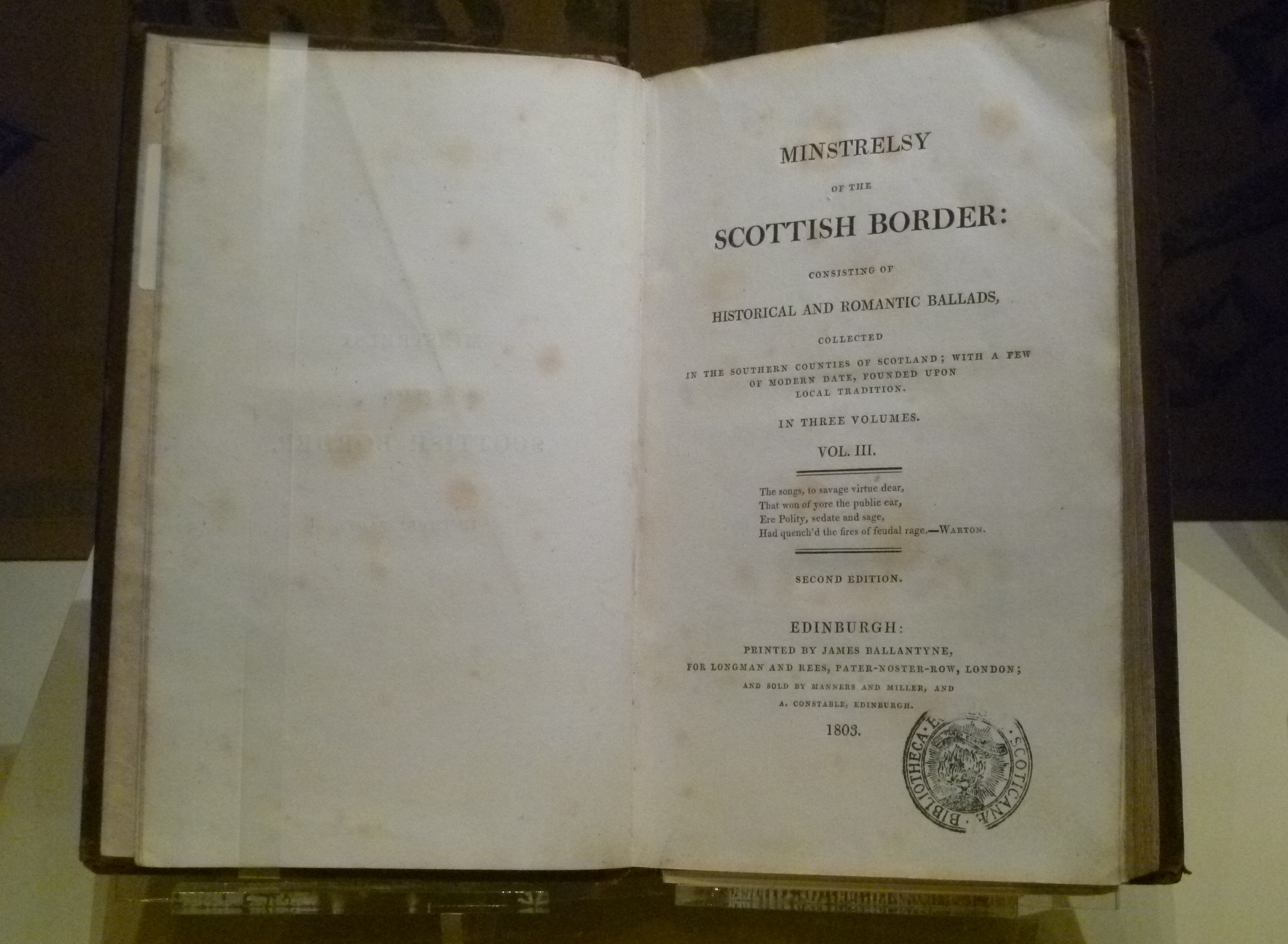
A copy of Scott's Minstrelsy of the Scottish Border in the National Museum of Scotland

Border ballads are a group of songs in the long tradition of balladry collected from the Anglo-Scottish border. Like all traditional ballads, they were traditionally sung unaccompanied. There may be a repeating motif, but there is no "chorus" as in most popular songs. The supernatural is a common theme in border ballads, as are recountings of raids and battles.

== Ballad types ==
The ballads belong to various groups of subjects, such as riding ballads like "Kinmont Willie"; historical ballads like "Sir Patrick Spens"; comic ballads like "Get Up and Bar the Door"; and those with supernatural themes including "Thomas the Rhymer" (also known as "True Thomas" or "Thomas of Erceldoune") and "Tam Lin".

== Writings about ==
Some of the earliest known references (in Middle Scots) to the ballads appeared in The Complaynt of Scotland (1549). Sir Walter Scott wrote about border ballads in Minstrelsy of the Scottish Border, first published in 1802–03. A. L. Lloyd said of the ballads:

The bare rolling stretch of country from the North Tyne and Cheviots to the Scottish southern uplands was for a long time the territory of men who spoke English but had the outlook of Afghan tribesmen; they prized a poem almost as much as plunder, and produced such an impressive assembly of local narrative songs that some people used to label all our greater folk poems as 'Border ballads'.

== See also ==
- Child Ballads
- List of the Child Ballads
