= Get Up and Bar the Door =

Traditional song

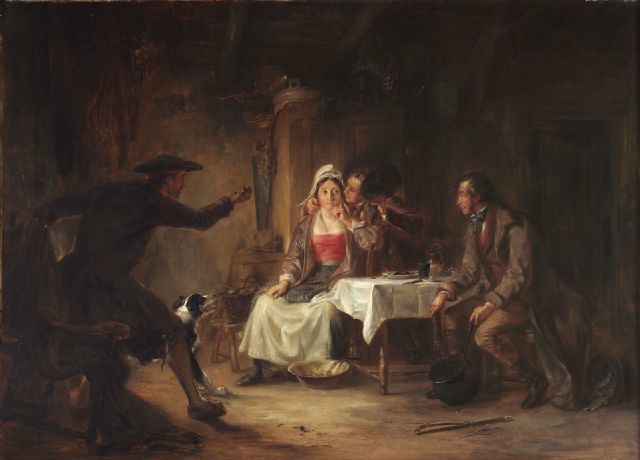
Illustration by Alexander George Fraser of Get Up and Bar the Door

Get Up and Bar the Door is a medieval Scots ballad about a battle of wills between a husband and wife. It is Child ballad 275 (Roud 115). According to Child, it was first published by David Herd.

== Synopsis ==
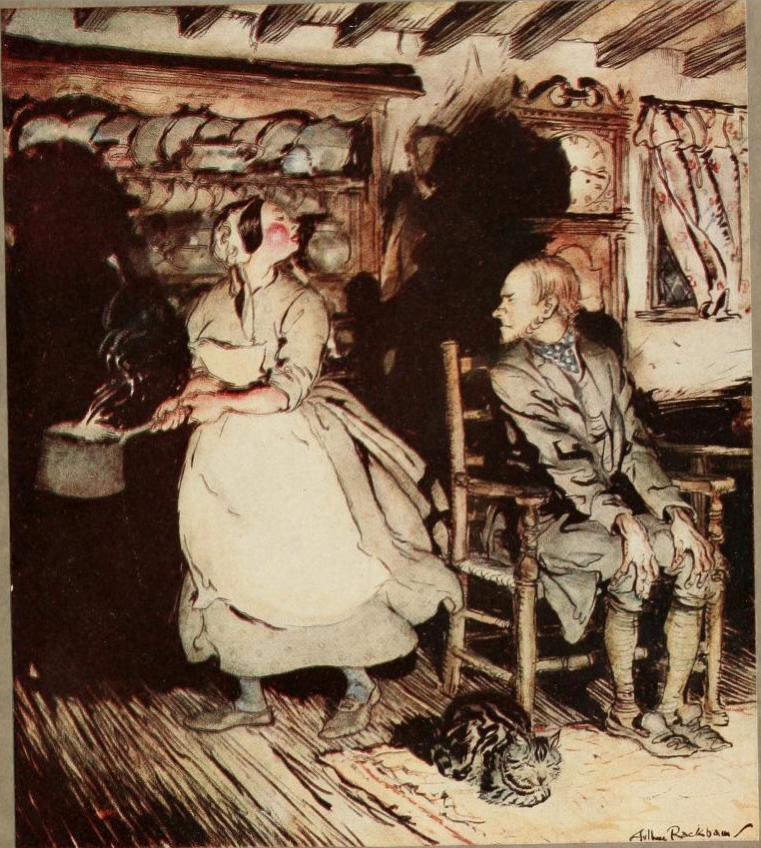
Illustration by Arthur Rackham of Get Up and Bar the Door

The story begins with the wife busy in her cooking of the pudding and household chores as well. As the wind picks up, the husband tells her to close and bar the door. They make an agreement that the next person who speaks must bar the door or close the door, but the door remains open. At midnight two thieves enter the house and eat the puddings that the wife has just made. The husband and wife watch them, but still neither speaks out of stubborn pride. Amazed, one of the thieves proposes to molest the wife and kiss her. Finally, the husband shouts "Will ye kiss my wife before my een, and scald me with pudding-broth?" The wife, having won the argument, gives three skips on the floor and says to her husband: "Goodman, you've spoken the foremost word, Get up and bar the door."

In some versions, the husband is named as Johnie Blunt of Crawford Moor. Child notes that the song was used by Prince Hoare to provide one of the principal scenes in his musical entertainment, No Song, No Supper, performed at Drury Lane in 1790.

Among many things, this folk ballad talks about the sense of lasting competition in a relationship. The man and the woman are too stubborn to do something that will benefit both. The ballad observes a possible consequence of being stubborn when carried to ludicrous lengths, since by being stubborn they lost their Martinmas puddings and left their persons and household open to crime.

== Recordings ==
- Martin Carthy - Shearwater (as "John Blunt")
- Ewan MacColl sang it on "The English and Scottish Popular Ballads (The Child Ballads) Volume I" (1956)
- Maddy Prior and June Tabor sang a version on "No More to the Dance" as "The Barring o' the Door" (1988)
