= List of editiones principes in languages other than Latin or Greek =

In classical scholarship, the editio princeps (plural: editiones principes) of a work is the first printed edition of the work, that previously had existed only in manuscripts, which could be circulated only after being copied by hand. The following is a list of literature works in languages other than Latin or Greek.

== Before 1400 ==
Date	Author, Work	Languages	Printer	Location	Comment
704-751	Uṣṇīṣa Vijaya Dhāraṇī Sūtra	Chinese translation		Bulguksa	The Great Dharani Sutra is believed to be the oldest surviving printed text in the world.
868	Diamond Sutra	Chinese translation	Wang Jie		This is the oldest printed text with a specific date.
953	Four Books and Five Classics	Chinese	Feng Dao		
983	Chinese Buddhist canon	Chinese			This edition contained either 1,076, 1,081 or 1,087 texts according to different sources. A list of these texts can be found here: . Only 14 fascicles from this edition currently survive.
1003	Records of the Three Kingdoms	Chinese			
1035	Records of the Grand Historian	Chinese			
1050	Huainanzi	Chinese			The only original copy of this edition was lost in 1945, although facsimile copies exist. The earliest extant edition is the Daozang redaction of 1445.
1111-1118	Daozang	Chinese			The earliest extant edition was printed in 1445.
1180	Classic of Mountains and Seas	Chinese	You Mao		
1341	Ballad of Mulan	Chinese			Printed as part of the Music Bureau Collection (Yuefu shiji). An earlier Southern Song edition may exist but doesn't have a date.

== 15th century ==
Date	Author, Work	Languages	Printer	Location	Comment
1472	Dante Alighieri, Divine Comedy	Italian	Johann Numeister and Evangelista Angelini da Trevi	Foligno	
1476	Geoffrey Chaucer, The Canterbury Tales	Middle English	William Caxton	Westminster	
1477	The Travels of Marco Polo	German translation	Friedrich Creussner	Nuremberg	
1480	Brut Chronicle	English	William Caxton	Westminster	
1480	Robert de Boron, Prose Merlin	Italian translation	Michele Tramezzino	Venice	
1485	Thomas Malory, Le Morte d'Arthur	Middle English	William Caxton	Westminster	
1488	Prose Lancelot	French	Jean Le Bourgeois, Jean du Pré	Rouen, Paris	
1489	Prose Tristan	French	Jean Le Bourgeois, Anthoine Vérard	Rouen	
1495	Joseph and Aseneth	French	John de Vigny		
1498	Vulgate Merlin	French	Antoine Verard	Paris	

== 16th century ==
Date	Author, Work	Languages	Printer	Location	Comment
c. 1510	A Gest of Robyn Hode	Middle English	Jan van Doesbroch	Antwerp	
1512	Genesis Rabbah	Hebrew		Constantinople	
1512	Il-yeon, Samguk yusa	Korean			Earliest extant edition.
1512	Kim Pusik, Samguk sagi	Korean			Earliest extant edition.
1514	Alphabet of Sirach	Hebrew		Salonica	
1520-3	Talmud	Hebrew, Aramaic	Daniel Bomberg	Venice	
1522	Luo Guanzhong, Romance of the Three Kingdoms	Chinese			
1524–25	Bible	Hebrew	Daniel Bomberg	Venice	Edition included masoretic notes, Aramaic targums and Rashi's commentary, see Mikraot Gedolot.
1537-38	Quran	Arabic	Paganino Paganini	Venice	The first-ever printed Quran in Arabic.
1558-1560	Zohar	Aramaic		Mantua	
1562	Sefer Yetzirah	Hebrew		Mantua	Includes four commentaries.
1599	Nihon Shoki	Japanese			Contains only the first two books. The whole Nihon Shoki was published in 1610.

== 17th century ==
Date	Author, Work	Languages	Printer	Location	Comment
1636	Krákumál	Old Norse and Latin translation	Ole Worm	Amsterdam	
1643	Anglo-Saxon Chronicle	Old English and Latin translation	Abraham Whelock		
1644	Kojiki	Japanese		Kyoto	
1663	Robin Hood's Progress to Nottingham	English	W. Gilbertson	London	
1663	Robin Hood Newly Revived	English	W. Gilbertson	London	
1663	The Jolly Pinder of Wakefield	English	W. Gilbertson	London	
1663	Robin Hood and the Bishop	English	W. Gilbertson	London	
1663	Robin Hood and the Butcher	English	W. Gilbertson	London	
1663	Robin Hood Rescuing Will Stutly	English	W. Gilbertson	London	
1663	Robin Hood and the Beggar	English	W. Gilbertson	London	
1663	Robin Hood and Queen Katherine	English	W. Gilbertson	London	
1663	Robin Hood and the Tanner	English	W. Gilbertson	London	
1663	Robin Hood and the Curtal Friar	English	W. Gilbertson	London	
1663	The Noble Fisherman	English	W. Gilbertson	London	
1663	Robin Hood and the Shepherd	English	W. Gilbertson	London	
1663	Robin Hood's Golden Prize	English	W. Gilbertson	London	
1663	Robin Hood's Chase	English	W. Gilbertson	London	
1663	Little John A Begging	English	W. Gilbertson	London	
1663	Robin Hood's Delight	English	W. Gilbertson	London	
1665	Snorri Sturluson, Prose Edda	Icelandic, Danish and Latin translations	P. J. Resenius	Copenhagen	
1665	Völuspá	Icelandic, Danish and Latin translations	P. J. Resenius	Copenhagen	
1665	Hávamál	Icelandic, Danish and Latin translations	P. J. Resenius	Copenhagen	
1697	Arabic Infancy Gospel	Arabic and Latin translation	Heinrich Sike	Utrecht	
1697	Heimskringla	Icelandic, Swedish and Latin translations	Johan Peringskiöld	Stockholm	

== 18th century ==
Date	Author, Work	Languages	Printer	Location	Comment
1704-1717	One Thousand and One Nights	French translation	Antoine Galland	Paris	
1728	Benvenuto Cellini, Vita di Benvenuto Cellini	Italian	Antonio Cocchi	Naples	
1730	Questions of Ezra	Armenian		Constantinople	
1732	Baha ad-Din ibn Shaddad, The Life of Saladin	Arabic and Latin translation	Albert Schultens	Leiden	
1737	Völsunga saga	Icelandic, Swedish and Latin translation	Eric Julius Biörner	Stockholm	
1737	Tale of Ragnar Lodbrok	Icelandic, Swedish and Latin translation	Eric Julius Biörner	Stockholm	
1761	Kālidāsa Shakuntala	Sanskrit		Calcutta	
1765	The Boy and the Mantle	Middle English	Thomas Percy	London	
1773	Tale of Ragnar's Sons	Old Norse and Latin translation	Jacob Langebek		
1780	Orkneyinga saga	Old Norse and Latin translation	Jonas Jonaeus	Copenhagen	
1782	Egil's Saga			Hrappsey	
1785	Bhagavad Gita	English translation	Charles Wilkins	London	
1787	Vafþrúðnismál	Icelandic and Latin translation	Arnamagnæan Institute	Copenhagen	
1787	Grímnismál	Icelandic and Latin translation	Arnamagnæan Institute	Copenhagen	
1787	Skírnismál	Icelandic and Latin translation	Arnamagnæan Institute	Copenhagen	
1787	Hárbarðsljóð	Icelandic and Latin translation	Arnamagnæan Institute	Copenhagen	
1787	Hymiskviða	Icelandic and Latin translation	Arnamagnæan Institute	Copenhagen	
1787	Lokasenna	Icelandic and Latin translation	Arnamagnæan Institute	Copenhagen	
1787	Þrymskviða	Icelandic and Latin translation	Arnamagnæan Institute	Copenhagen	
1787	Hrafnagaldr Óðins	Icelandic and Latin translation	Arnamagnæan Institute	Copenhagen	
1787	Baldrs draumar	Icelandic and Latin translation	Arnamagnæan Institute	Copenhagen	
1787	Alvíssmál	Icelandic and Latin translation	Arnamagnæan Institute	Copenhagen	
1787	Fjölsvinnsmál	Icelandic and Latin translation	Arnamagnæan Institute	Copenhagen	
1787	Hyndluljóð	Icelandic and Latin translation	Arnamagnæan Institute	Copenhagen	
1787	Sólarljóð	Icelandic and Latin translation	Arnamagnæan Institute	Copenhagen	
1788	Bhagavata Purana	French translation	Mariedas Poullee	Paris	
1795	Robin Hood and the Potter	Middle English	Joseph Ritson	London	

== 19th century ==
Date	Author, Work	Languages	Printer	Location	Comment
1802	Ywain and Gawain	Middle English	Joseph Ritson	London	
1802	Sir Launfal	Middle English	Joseph Ritson	London	
1802	Libeaus Desconus	Middle English	Joseph Ritson	London	
1804	Sir Tristrem	Middle English	Sir Walter Scott	Edinburgh	
1806	Bhagavad Gita	Sanskrit	Sir William Jones		
1806-1810	Ramayana	Sanskrit and English translation	William Carey and Joshua Marshman	Serampore	This 3-volume edition contains only the first two books of the Ramayana. The first complete edition of the Ramayana was published by Gaspare Gorresio in 1843–1850 in Paris.
1806	Robin Hood and the Monk	English	Robert Jamieson	Edinburgh	
1810	Sir Cleges	Middle English	Henry Weber	Edinburgh	
1815	Beowulf	Old English and Latin translation	Grímur Jónsson Thorkelin	Copenhagen	
1816	Kena Upanishad		Rammohun Roy	Calcutta	
1816	Isha Upanishad		Rammohun Roy	Calcutta	
1817	Katha Upanishad		Rammohun Roy	Calcutta	
1817	Mandukya Upanishad		Rammohun Roy	Calcutta	
1818	Mundaka Upanishad		Rammohun Roy	Calcutta	
1819	Stanzaic Morte Arthur	Middle English	Thomas Ponton	London	
1819	Ascension of Isaiah	Ethiopic	Richard Laurence	Oxford	
1821	Book of Enoch	English translation	Richard Laurence		
1823	Devi Mahatmya	English translation	Cavali Venkata Ramasswani	Calcutta	
1830	Bhagavata Purana	Sanskrit	B.C. Bandopadhyaya	Calcutta	
1834-1839	Mahabharata	Sanskrit		Calcutta	
1837	Mahāvaṃsa	Pali and English translation	George Turnour	Colombo	
1838	Book of Enoch	Ethiopic	Richard Laurence		
1838	Kālidāsa Kumārasambhava	Sanskrit and Latin translation	Adolphus Fridericus Stenzler	London	
1838	Owain, or the Lady of the Fountain	Middle Welsh and English translation	Lady Charlotte Guest		
1838	Chrétien de Troyes, Yvain, the Knight of the Lion	Old French	Lady Charlotte Guest		
1839	Peredur son of Efrawg	Middle Welsh and English translation	Lady Charlotte Guest		
1839	Sir Gawain and the Green Knight	Middle English	Frederic Madden	London	
1839	The Awntyrs off Arthure	Middle English	Frederic Madden	London	
1839	Sir Gawain and the Carle of Carlisle	Middle English	Frederic Madden	London	
1839	The Greene Knight	Middle English	Frederic Madden	London	
1839	King Arthur and King Cornwall	Middle English	Frederic Madden	London	
1839	The Wedding of Sir Gawain and Dame Ragnelle	Middle English	Frederic Madden	London	
1840	Kālidāsa Mālavikāgnimitram	Sanskrit and Latin translation	Otto Fridericus Tullberg	Bonn	
1840	Geraint and Enid	Middle Welsh and English translation	Lady Charlotte Guest		
1840	Vishnu Purana	English translation	H. H. Wilson	London	
1842	Culhwch and Olwen	Middle Welsh and English translation	Lady Charlotte Guest		
1842	The Avowing of King Arthur	Middle English	John Robson	London	
1842	Egyptian Book of the Dead	Ancient Egyptian	Karl Richard Lepsius	Leipzig	
1843	The Dream of Rhonabwy	Middle Welsh and English translation	Lady Charlotte Guest		
1843	Epistle to the Laodiceans		R. Anger	Leipzig	
1843	Samaveda	Sanskrit	J. Stevenson	London	
1843	Hotsuma Tsutae	Japanese	Michimasa Ogasawara	Kyoto	
1844	Sir Perceval of Galles	Middle English	J. O. Halliwell	London	
1847	Alliterative Morte Arthur	Middle English	J. O. Halliwell	Brixton	
1847	Fagrskinna		Peter Andreas Munch	Oslo	
1848	Solomon and Saturn	Old English	J. N. Kemble	London	
1849	Sahih Muslim	Arabic	Azim al-Din and Ghulam Akbar		
1849-1874	Rigveda	Sanskrit	Max Müller	London	
1850	Wycliffe Bible	Middle English	Josiah Forshall and Frederic Madden		
1850	Chrétien de Troyes, Lancelot, the Knight of the Cart	Old French	W.J.A. Jonckbloet	The Hague	
1851	Markandeya Purana	Sanskrit and English translation	Krishna Mohan Banerjea	Calcutta	
1851-1853	Sahih al-Bukhari	Arabic	Ahmad Ali Saharanpuri		
1852-1859	Yajurveda	Sanskrit	Albrecht Weber	Berlin	
1853	Conflict of Adam and Eve with Satan	German	August Dillmann		
1853-1877	Lalitavistara Sūtra	Sanskrit	Rajendralal Mitra	Calcutta	
1855	Apocalypse of Elijah	Hebrew	Adolf Jellinek		
1855	Dhammapada	Pali and Latin translation	Vincent Fausboll	Copenhagen	
1856	Atharvaveda	Sanskrit	Rudolf von Roth, William Dwight Whitney	Berlin	
1856	Chrétien de Troyes, Erec and Enide	Old French	Immanuel Bekker		
1856	Popol Vuh	Spanish	Carl Scherzer	Vienna	
1857	Brahmanda Purana	Sanskrit	Venkateshvara Steam Press	Bombay	
1857	Linga Purana	Sanskrit		Bombay	
1859	Book of Jubilees	Ethiopic	August Dillmann		
1863	Apocalypse of Abraham	Old Church Slavonic	N. S. Tikhonravov	St. Petersburg	
1866	2 Baruch	Syriac	Antonio Maria Ceriani	Milan	
1866-68	Chrétien de Troyes, Perceval, the Story of the Grail	Old French	Charles Potvin		
1870	Tain Bó Fraích	Irish and English translation	J. O'Beirne Crowe		
1873-1879	Agni Purana	Sanskrit	Rajendralal Mitra	Calcutta	
1874	Matsya Purana	Sanskrit	Jagaddhitecchu Press	Poona	
1875	Kurma Purana	Sanskrit in Telugu characters	Vartamanatarangini Press	Madras	
1876	Ganesha Purana	Sanskrit	Jagaddhitecchu Press	Poona	
1876-1878	Aided Con Culainn	English translation	Whitley Stokes	Paris	
1877-1897	Jataka	Pali and English translation	Vincent Fausboll	London	
1878	Tochmarc Étaíne	Irish	Edward Müller	Paris	
1879-1883	Vinaya Pitaka	Pali	Hermann Oldenberg	London	
1880	Second Book of Enoch	Old Church Slavonic	A. Popov	Moscow	
1880	Compert Con Culainn	Irish	Ernst Windisch	Leipzig	
1880	The Tale of Mac Da Thó's Pig	Irish	Ernst Windisch	Leipzig	
1880	Fled Bricrenn	Irish	Ernst Windisch	Leipzig	
1880	Serglige Con Culainn	Irish	Ernst Windisch	Leipzig	
1882-1897	Mahāvastu	Sanskrit	Emile Senart	Paris	
1883	Cave of Treasures	German translation	Carl Bezold	Leipzig	
1883-1885	Compert Conchobuir	Irish and English translation	Kuno Meyer	Paris	
1883-1885	Aided Conrói maic Dáiri	Irish	Kuno Meyer	Paris	
1884	Epic of Gilgamesh	English translation	Leonidas Le Cenci Hamilton		This translation incorrectly calls the main character Izdubar instead of Gilgamesh and takes many liberties with the story. Partial translations were previously published by George Smith in 1876 and H.F. Talbot in 1877. The first translation to call him Gilgamesh was the William Muss-Arnolt translation of 1901.
1884-1904	Samyutta Nikaya	Pali	Leon Feer	London	6 volumes
1885	Sutta Nipata	Pali	Vincent Fausboll	London	
1885-1900	Anguttara Nikaya	Pali	Richard Morris	London	
1886	Divyavadana	Sanskrit	Edward Byles Cowell, R.A. Neil	Cambridge	Two Chinese translations of the Ashokavadana had previously been published as part of the Chinese Buddhist canon in 983. Excerpts had also been published in French translation in 1844 by Eugène Burnouf.
1887	Aided Meidbe	English translation	Kuno Meyer		
1887	Táin Bó Flidhais	Irish	Ernst Windisch	Leipzig	
1887	Táin Bó Dartada	Irish	Ernst Windisch	Leipzig	
1887	Táin Bó Regamain	Irish	Ernst Windisch	Leipzig	
1887	Táin Bó Regamna	Irish	Ernst Windisch	Leipzig	
1888	Cave of Treasures	Syriac	Carl Bezold	Leipzig	
1888	Aided Derbforgaill	Irish and German translation	Heinrich Zimmer	Berlin	
1888-1925	Majjhima Nikaya	Pali	V. Trenckner, Robert Chalmers, Caroline Rhys Davids	London	4 volumes
1889	Mesca Ulad	Irish	William M. Hennessy	Dublin	
1890	Tochmarc Emire	Irish	Kuno Meyer	Paris	
1890-1911	Digha Nikaya	Pali	T.W. Rhys Davids and J.E. Carpenter	London	
1891	Tochmarc Ferbe	Irish and German translation	Ernst Windisch	Leipzig	
1892	Aided Chonchobuir	French translation	Marie-Henri d'Arbois de Jubainville	Paris	
1892	Imthechta Tuaithe Luachra 7 Aided Fergusa	Irish and English translation	Standish Hayes O'Grady	London	
1892	Cath Ruis na Ríg	Irish and English translation	Edmund Hogan	Dublin	
1893	Slavonic Life of Adam and Eve	Old Church Slavonic	V. Jagic	Vienna	
1893	Aided Guill meic Garbada ocus Aided Gairb Glinne Ríge	Irish and English translation	Whitley Stokes	Paris	
1893	Buddhacarita	Sanskrit	E. B. Cowell	Oxford	
1894	Pyramid Texts	Ancient Egyptian	Gaston Maspero	Paris	
1895	Brahma Purana	Sanskrit	Hari Narayana Apte	Poona	
1895	The Voyage of Bran	Irish and English translation	Kuno Meyer	London	
1897	Pararaton	Old Javanese and Dutch translation	Jan Laurens Andries Brandes	Batavia	
1899	Apocalypse of Zephaniah		Georg Steindorff	Leipzig	
1900	Ladder of Jacob	German translation	N. Bonwetsch		
1900	Testament of Isaac	Coptic	I. Guidi	Rome	
1900	Testament of Jacob	Coptic	I. Guidi	Rome	

== 20th century ==
Date	Author, Work	Languages	Printer	Location	Comment
1901	Enuma Elis	Babylonian	Leonard William King	London	A partial English translation was published by George Smith in 1876. A complete translation by King was published in 1902.
1901	Ana Kurnugê, qaqqari la târ	Akkadian	Peter Jensen		First transliterated edition. The first cuneiform edition was by François Lenormant in 1873.
1902	Nagarakretagama	Old Javanese	Jan Laurens Andries Brandes	Batavia	
1903	Tochmarc Luaine 7 aided Arthirne	Irish and English translation	Whitley Stokes	Paris	
1904	Táin Bó Cúailnge	English translation	L. Winifred Faraday	London	
1904	Aided Áenfir Aífe	Irish and English translation	Kuno Meyer	Dublin	
1905	Kebra Nagast	Ethiopic and German translation	Carl Bezold	Munich	
1906	Aided Ceit maic Mágach	Irish and English translation	Kuno Meyer	Dublin	
1906	Aided Cheltchair mac Uthechair	Irish and English translation	Kuno Meyer	Dublin	
1906	Aided Fergusa maic Roig	Irish and English translation	Kuno Meyer	Dublin	
1906	Aided Laegairi Buadaig	Irish and English translation	Kuno Meyer	Dublin	
1907-1910	Apocalypse of Peter	Ethiopic and French translation	Sylvain Grebaut		
1909	Odes of Solomon	Syriac	James Rendel Harris	Cambridge	
1913	Epistula Apostolorum	Ethiopic and French translation	Louis Guerrier	Paris	
1915	Nergal and Ereshkigal	Babylonian	J.A. Knudtzon	Leipzig	
1916	Cath Airtig	Irish and English translation	R. I. Best		
1921	Tochmarc Treblainne	Irish	Kuno Meyer		
1922	Cath Leitrich Ruide	Irish and French translation	Margaret E. Dobbs	Paris	
1923	Cath Findchorad	Irish and English translation	Margaret E. Dobbs		
1926	Cath Cumair	Irish	Margaret E. Dobbs		
1926-1927	Cath Aenaig Macha	Irish	Margaret E. Dobbs		
1927	Tibetan Book of the Dead	English translation	Walter Evans-Wentz	London	
1928	3 Enoch	Hebrew and Modern English translation	Hugo Odeberg		
1935	Coffin Texts Spells 1-75	Ancient Egyptian	Adriaan de Buck	Chicago	
1937	Inanna's Descent to the Nether World	Sumerian	Samuel Noah Kramer		A more complete version was published by Kramer is 1942.
1938	Coffin Texts Spells 76-163	Ancient Egyptian	Adriaan de Buck	Chicago	
1947	Coffin Texts Spells 164-267	Ancient Egyptian	Adriaan de Buck	Chicago	
1951	Coffin Texts Spells 268-354	Ancient Egyptian	Adriaan de Buck	Chicago	
1954	Coffin Texts Spells 355-471	Ancient Egyptian	Adriaan de Buck	Chicago	
1956	Coffin Texts Spells 472-786	Ancient Egyptian	Adriaan de Buck	Chicago	
1959	Gospel of Thomas	Coptic and English translation	Antoine Guillaumont		French, German and Dutch translations were published at the same time.
1961	Coffin Texts Spells 787-1185	Ancient Egyptian	Adriaan de Buck	Chicago	
1963	Apocalypse of Adam	Coptic	Alexander Böhlig and Pahor Labib	Halle	
1963	Coptic Apocalypse of Paul	Coptic	Alexander Böhlig and Pahor Labib	Halle	
1965	Atra-Hasis	Babylonian	W.G. Lambert, A.R. Millard	London	An incomplete English translation of the epic was published by George Smith in 1876. After the discovery of additional tablets, a complete English translation was published by Lambert and Millard in 1969.
1968	Apocryphon of James	Coptic	Michel Malinine	Zürich	
1976	The Book of Giants	Aramaic	J. T. Milik	Oxford	
