= Forresters Manuscript =

Book of 21 English Robin Hood ballads

The Forresters Manuscript is a quarto book of 21 English Robin Hood ballads (including two versions of one ballad, The Jolly Pinder of Wakefield), believed to have been written sometime in the 1670s. It's named the Forresters Manuscript after the first and last ballads in the book, which are both titled in the book, Robin Hood and the Forresters.This manuscript remained undiscovered and unknown for over 300 years after it was written until it turned up at an auction house in 1993, where it was found by the Bristol bookseller A. R. Heath, sold to the London book-dealer Bernard Quaritch Ltd., and then came to rest in the British Library. It was then published for the first time in 1998 as Robin Hood: The Forresters Manuscript, edited by Stephen Knight.

While all 21 ballads had already been published in broadside ballads and garlands in the 17th and 18th centuries, 13 of the ballads in Forresters are noticeably different from how they appear in the broadsides and garlands, 9 of these ballads being substantially longer. 4 of the ballads in Forresters would be the earliest known versions of these ballads. The Forresters Manuscript has been praised by scholars for improving the ballads from how they appeared in the broadsides and garlands. When Stephen Knight and Thomas H. Ohlgren published Robin Hood and Other Outlaw Tales in 1997, they included the Forresters versions of The Noble Fisherman and Robin Hood and Queen Katherine, citing the Forresters versions as the best versions of these ballads.

== The manuscript ==
The original quarto is in the British Library, known as Additional MS 71158. The book is made of binding of smooth dark brown calf, containing 102 unpaginated leaves of paper. Most of the paper is watermarked similar to an example dated to London in 1677, with the first and last few pages containing the watermark "I C O", denoting the papermaker I. Coulard, who was active circa 1671-1686. These watermarks, and the fact that the last 4 ballads appear to be directly copied from the 1670 Robin Hood Garland, have led scholars to conclude the manuscript was written in the 1670s.

The handwriting in the manuscript appears to be by two people. Hand A wrote all of the first 4 ballads, and the opening stanzas of the rest, including all of ballads 9, 10B, and 16. Hand B wrote the bulk of ballads 5-8, 10A, 11-15, and 17-21. Knight speculated that, "the supervisor was a person of leisure, who found the mechanics of copying taxing, and from ballad 5 on usually employed a professional to complete each text."

== Contents ==
Of the 21 ballads in the Manuscript, 17 had previously been published individually as broadsides. 16 of those ballads (the exception is Robin Hood and the Tinker) were later published together in the 1663 Robin Hood Garland. All 16 of these ballads were then later reprinted in the 1670 Robin Hood Garland. Of these 16 ballads, 6 of them have noticeably longer versions in Forresters. The 4 remaining ballads in Forresters had never been published before, and the Forresters versions of these ballads are the earliest known versions. One of these, Robin Hood and Allan-a-Dale, would be published as a broadside in the 1670s around the same time the Forresters Manuscript was being written, and the broadside version is actually longer. The remaining 3 previously unpublished ballads would not be published until the 18th century. All 3 of the 18th century versions are noticeably shorter than the versions in Forresters.

== Possible purpose of the manuscript ==
Steven Knight speculated that the original editor of the manuscript was planning to publish their own garland, one that would outdo the 1663 garland. All the ballads in the 1663 Garland were based on the ballads as they appeared in the earlier broadsheets (except for a shorter, alternate version of Robin Hood and Queen Katherine, which was published in the garland along with the broadside version of the same ballad). The original editor of Forresters appears to have been relying on older, longer manuscripts, now lost, without having to shorten them to fit on a broadsheet. Knight further speculated that the editor was initially unaware of the 1670 garland, and when they found out about it, it upset their plans for publishing their own garland. That might explain why the last 4 ballads in the Manuscript seem to be directly copied from the 1670 garland.

== Differences between Forresters and the broadsides ==
The following chart is a list of the ballads in the Forresters Manuscript in the order in which they appear in the manuscript. Most of the ballads in Forresters have different titles from the broadside ballads, generally less dramatic and attention-getting. For different versions to be described as "nearly identical", both versions have the same number of stanzas, where each line conveys the same meaning, even if the words are different.

An * before a Broadside Title indicates that there is also another version of the ballad in the Percy Folio. Since none of the Percy Folio versions are complete, the number of stanzas in these versions are not counted.

Differences Between Forresters and Broadsides
Forresters Title	Broadside Title	Child Ballad No.	Number of Stanzas in Forresters	Number of Stanzas in Broadsides	Major Differences
Robin Hood and the Forresters I	Robin Hood's Progress to Nottingham	139	21	16	In Forresters, the opening stanza reveals Robin was raised by someone named Randolph. In Forresters, when Robin first talks to the forresters, one of them tries to wrestle Robin, but Robin defeats him. Then the wager starts. In both versions, Robin kills 14 of the forresters with his arrows leaving the last survivor "he that first began the fray", who tries to flee, but Robin fires another arrow, "and fetcht him back again". In the broadsides, there follows an extra stanza of Robin mocking the last forrester before firing another arrow "That split his head in twain." In Forresters, there is no such follow-up (presumably, the last forrester was instantly killed when Robin "fetcht him back again" with the arrow). In both versions, the people of Nottingham rise up to pursue Robin. In the broadsides, "Some lost legs and some lost arms" in pursuit of Robin. In Forresters, only one man is able to catch up to Robin, but Robin "knock'd him oer the pate." The broadsides end with the people of Nottingham burying the forresters. Forresters ends with Robin returning to Loxley, reuniting with Randolph, and they celebrate with drinks.
Robin Hood and the Bride	Robin Hood and Allan-a-Dale	138	22	27	This is essentially two different ballads of the same story. In Forresters, the young man Robin helps is unnamed. In the broadsides, Robin asks his name and he gives it as "Allin a Dale" (sic). Little John and Nick the Miller's son are mentioned only in the broadsides. In Forresters, the intended groom is only described as rich. In the broadsides, he is a wealthy, grave, old knight. In Forresters, the person performing the wedding is referred to as a priest. In the broadsides, he is a bishop. In Forresters, Robin and his men promptly storm the church where the wedding is being held, causing the priest and the clerk to hide, while the intended groom flees. In the broadsides, Robin first disguises himself as a harper to the wedding, blowing his horn to summon his men and Allin. No one hides (and it isn't mentioned what happens to the intended groom, the wealthy, grave, old knight, or how he reacts). In Forresters, Robin orders the priest and clerk to come out of hiding and perform the wedding for the young man and the bride. They do so. In the broadsides, the bishop refuses to perform the wedding, so Robin takes off the bishop's coat, puts it on Little John, and Little John performs the wedding. Forresters ends with Robin making the father of the bride give his consent for the wedding. There is no mention of the father in the broadsides. Instead, the broadsides end with Robin and his men returning to the forest, possibly with Allin and his bride going with them.
Robin Hood and the Old Wife	Robin Hood and the Bishop	143	29	23	In the broadsides, Robin's antagonist is a bishop. In Forresters, it is the Sheriff of Nottingham. While both versions tell essentially the same story, the poetry is entirely different. It is basically two ballads of the same story. Will Scarlet appears in the Forresters version, but not in the broadsides. The broadsides end with Robin tying the bishop to a tree, forcing him to sing a mass, then letting him go, riding on his horse while holding its tail. Forresters ends with the Sheriff just fleeing at once at the sight of Robin and his men, while Robin pays the old wife twenty pounds.
Robin Hoods Fishing	The Noble Fisherman	148	46	28	For much of the ballad, the Forresters will take two stanzas to convey the same meaning that the broadsides convey with one stanza. In Forresters, when Robin takes aim at the French pirate ship, he asks the Master of his ship where he should fire his arrow, and the Master tells him to aim at the steersman. When Robin kills the steersman, another French pirate takes the helm, and Robin kills him too. No other pirate will take the helm after that. In Forresters, when Robin and the fishermen board the pirate ship they find three survivors (but with no mention of what they do with them). In both versions, Robin takes his share of the gold found on the pirate ship and pledges to give half of it to the widow who sponsored him. In the broadsides, he uses the other half to make a "habitation" for the "opprest" (sic). In Forresters, he uses that half to make a chapel.
Robin Hood and the Sheriffe	Robin Hood and the Golden Arrow	152	70	33 (in a Garland, c. 1741)	In Forresters, the first 23 stanzas is a lengthy prologue where Robin returns to his men in the forest from his Fishing adventure (see directly above) where Little John brags that he recently stole the Sheriff of Nottingham's silverware. Soon after the Sheriff is waylaid in the forest by Friar Tuck and Scadlok, who take him to dine with Robin and his men, where the Sheriff can see they're eating off the Sheriff's own silverware. Then they let him go and the Sheriff goes off to see King Richard to complain of Robin Hood, which is the point in the story where the Garland version begins. Both versions then tell essentially the same story, with Forresters adding several additional stanzas that don't alter the story too differently from the Garland version. The biggest difference is in the final stanzas. In Forresters, the final stanza announces this is the end of this story of Robin Hood. In the Garland, the final stanza announces that the end of Robin Hood will soon follow. This is because in the Garland, this ballad was followed by the ballad Robin Hood and the Valiant Knight, which contains an account of the death of Robin Hood.
Robin Hood and the Sheapard	Robin Hood and the Shepherd	135	24	28	The broadsides have 4 stanzas that aren't in Forresters. Otherwise, the two versions are nearly identical.
Robin Hood and the Bishopp	Robin Hood and the Bishop of Hereford	144	39	(in a Garland, c. 1741) 21; (in Elizabeth Cochrane's Song-Book, c.1730) 11	In Forresters, Little John appears at the start. In the Garland and the Song-Book, he doesn't appear until Robin blows his horn and his merry men, Little John among them, surround the bishop. In Forresters, it is Little John's idea for Robin and the men initially with him to disguise themselves as shepherds. In the Garland only, Little John directly threatens to kill the bishop. In the Garland and Forresters, Robin and his men steal 300 pounds from the bishop. In the Song-Book, they steal 100 pounds. In the Garland, the bishop is made to dance with Robin. In the Song-Book, the bishop is made to sing a mass. In Forresters, the bishop is made to dance with Robin, sing a mass, and formally forgive Robin and his merry men.
Robin Hood and the Butcher	*Robin Hood and the Butcher	122	51	30	In Forresters, Robin is with Little John when he spies the butcher and asks Little John to approach him. Little John refuses because the butcher has a dog and Little John's afraid the dog will attack. Robin kills the dog with an arrow. The butcher challenges Robin to a fight, but Robin uses his sword to chop off the top of the butcher's staff. He then buys the butcher's cart and its meats for a generous price the butcher's pleased with. In the broadsides, there's no dog or Little John at the start, and no initial hostility between Robin and the butcher as Robin buys the butcher's cart and its meats. In the fragmented version of the Percy Folio, there is no Little John at the start, but there is the butcher's dog, who attacks Robin which is why Robin kills it. A fight then starts between Robin and the butcher, but the outcome is missing. In all versions, Robin goes to Nottingham posing as a butcher. In Forresters, he stops at the Sheriff's house and buys wine and ale from the Sheriff's wife. The next day, "a proud sarjant" (sic) shows Robin where in town he can sell his meats. In the Percy fragment also, Robin buys wine and ale from the Sheriff's wife, but there's no passing of days and no "proud sarjant". In all versions, Robin sells his meats so cheaply that he quickly sells out of all his meats, but makes very little money off of it. The other butchers invite Robin to dine with them at the Sheriff's house. In the broadsides, they dine there immediately; in the Percy fragment, they dine there later in the day (and a portion of the ballad after this is lost); in Forresters, they dine there the next day. In Forresters, it is mentioned that the Sheriff's wife pours out the drinks. In both the broadsides and Forresters, while dining at the Sheriff's house, Robin spends so freely, that everyone's convinced he is an unthrifty heir. The Sheriff asks Robin if he has any horned beasts to sell. Robin claims he has hundreds. The Sheriff offers to buy them for three hundred pounds if Robin will take him to them. In Forresters and the Percy fragments, Robin takes the Sheriff and seven of the butchers to the forest; in the broadsides the Sheriff goes with Robin to the forest alone. In all versions, Robin takes the Sheriff to see some deer in the wild and claims they're his. That is when the Sheriff realizes he has been tricked. Robin then blows his horn and his merry men arrive and surround the Sheriff. In Forresters and the broadsides, Little John is among the merry men. In the broadsides, this is Little John's first appearance in the ballad. None of the surviving Percy fragments of this ballad mention Little John. The broadsides end with Robin taking all the Sheriff's money and sending him back on his horse, telling the Sheriff to commend Robin to the Sheriff's wife (the only mention of her in the broadsides). In Forresters, Robin ties the Sheriff to a tree, but gives the seven butchers with him meat and lets them go. He takes most of the Sheriff's money, leaves him two shillings and lets him go. Both Forresters and the Percy fragments end with the Sheriff returning home to his wife and telling her of his encounter. The conversation's a little different in the two versions, but in both versions, the Sheriff's wife voices her approval of Robin and the Sheriff promises not to go after him.
Robin Hood and Queen Catherin	*Robin Hood and Queen Katherine	145	66	(in the broadsides) 42; (in the 1663 Garland) 35	All versions start with Robin and his men stealing gold from the king's messengers and giving it to the queen, gaining her favor. In Forresters, the next scene is of the king and queen agreeing to an archery contest between his archers and hers for a wager. This was also apparently true in the Percy fragments, but most of that part is lost. In the broadsides, we only learn of the archery contest when the Queen's page tells Robin of it; in the Garland, the contest is mentioned near the start, but not the talk between the king and queen. In the broadsides and the Garland, we only learn of the wager at the start of the contest. All versions name the queen as Katherine (or Catherin in Forresters), but only the Percy fragments name the king as Henry, in the other versions, he is unnamed. Both the broadsides and the Garland mention someone named Clifton taking part in the archery contest, but don't explain who he is. Only in Forresters is it revealed that "Clifton" is the alias used by Little John in the archery contest. In all versions Robin offers to the Bishop of Hereford to pay back half the gold he stole from him. Only in the Percy version, the bishop rebukes Robin for this, saying it is not such a good deed to return the Bishop's own money that Robin had previously stolen from him. The Garland version is the only one that ends with the king making Robin the Earl of Huntington.
Robin Hood and the Pinder of Wakefield I	*The Jolly Pinder of Wakefield	124	35	11 (Child makes it 13 with two 2-line stanzas)	In Forresters, the pinder is named George a Green, in the broadsides he is unnamed. In the broadsides, the pinder fights Robin, Little John, and Will (it is unclear if he fought them all at once or one at a time) until he breaks all their swords. In Forresters, he only fights Robin, but the fight lasts until sunset and they agree to resume the fight the next day. Will offers to end the fight by shooting the pinder with an arrow, but both Little John and Robin rebuke him for this cowardice. In overhearing the argument, the pinder finds out for the first time that the man he has been fighting is Robin Hood, and eagerly agrees to join him. In the broadsides, Robin makes the offer to the pinder to join his men after the fight, and the pinder accepts, with no mention on whether the pinder ever knows that he is Robin Hood. In both versions, the pinder promises to join Robin and his Merry Men after the pinder's master has paid him on an upcoming holy day. In the broadsides, that day is Michaelmas, in Forresters, it is Easter. In both versions, the pinder takes Robin and his men to his home to dine. In Forresters, his wife is mentioned and named Genney.
Robin Hood and the Pinder of Wakefield II	*The Jolly Pinder of Wakefield	124	11	11 (see note on Child above)	Nearly identical
Robin Hood and the Fryer	*Robin Hood and the Curtal Friar	123	42	41	In the Percy fragments, Robin asks the friar to carry him across the stream by appealing to his charity. The friar complies because he realizes he hasn't done a good deed in a while. In the broadsides and Forresters, Robin threatens him. In the Percy fragments, when the friar orders his dogs to attack Robin and his men, Robin begs him to stop, and the friar calls off his dogs without a fight. In the broadsides and Forresters, Robin doesn't beg him to stop until after Robin and his men fight the friar's dogs. There are two stanzas in Forresters that are not in the broadsides. There is one stanza in the broadsides that is not in Forresters. Otherwise, the two versions are nearly identical.
Robin Hood and the Preists	Robin Hood's Golden Prize	147	24	24	Aside from the title, both versions are nearly identical.
Robin Hood and the Begger	Robin Hood and the Beggar I	133	31	31	Nearly identical
Robin Hood and the Tincker	Robin Hood and the Tinker	127	42	42	Nearly identical
Robin Hood and Will Scathlock	Robin Hood Rescuing Will Stutly	141	38	38	In the broadsides, Robin rescues Will Stutly, in Forresters, he rescues Will Scathlock (or Scatlock). So every time Will's last name is mentioned it is always Stutly in the broadsides, while in Forresters, it is either Scathlock or Scatlock. Otherwise, the two versions are nearly identical.
Robin Hood and the Stranger	Robin Hood Newly Revived	128	25	25	Forresters has an extra stanza after Robin greeting the Stranger where he asks him where he is from. Otherwise, nearly identical until the end. At the end, Robin names his cousin Scathlock in Forresters, and Scarlet in the broadsides. Both versions end with two lines from Robin declaring he, Little John, and Will are going to be "three of the bravest outlaws…in the North Country". In Forresters, those last two lines are placed at the end of the previous 4 line stanza, making the only 6 line stanza in the ballad. In the broadsides, those last two lines are separated as the start of a final 4 line stanza where the last two lines refer to a "second part" of Robin Hood. In the broadsides, this ballad made up only the first half of the broadside sheet. In the second half, there was a brief, unrelated, 7 stanza ballad that was later expanded and published separately as Robin Hood and the Scotchman.
Robin Hood and the King	The King's Disguise, and Friendship with Robin Hood	151	64	44 (in a Garland, c. 1753)	Forresters has an introductory stanza not in the Garland version. Stanzas 2-55 of the Forresters version is mostly identical to stanzas 1-43 of the Garland version, with Forresters having 14 stanzas that aren't in the Garland, while the Garland has 3 stanzas that aren't in Forresters. One of Forresters' additional stanzas features Little John, while the Garland version doesn't mention him. Some of the stanzas involving the dinner Robin hosts for the disguised King and his men are arranged differently in the Garland from the way they're arranged in Forresters. The Garland ends with a concluding stanza promising to follow up with the end of Robin Hood. Forresters ends with a 9-stanza epilogue detailing Robin's end. In this epilogue, Robin lives at the King's court for 3 years, goes to the Kerklees (sic) monastery with the King's permission, falls ill there, and has a friar bleed him out. But the friar betrays Robin, bleeding him out enough to kill him. The prioress then arranges for Robin's burial.
Robin Hood and the Tanner	Robin Hood and the Tanner	126	37	37	Nearly identical
Robin Hoods Chace	Robin Hood's Chase	146	24	24	Nearly identical
Little Johns Begging	*Little John a Begging	142	22	22	Nearly identical
Robin Hood and the Forresters II	Robin Hood's Delight	136	24	24	Nearly identical
