= Arthur o' Bower =

British nursery rhyme/Poem

"Arthur o' Bower" is a short British nursery rhyme or rhymed riddle originally published in 1805 but known, on the evidence of a letter by William Wordsworth, to have been current in the late 18th century in Cumberland. The title character is a personification of a storm wind, sometimes believed to represent King Arthur in his character as storm god or leader of the Wild Hunt. The Roud Folk Song Index, which catalogues folk songs and their variations by number, classifies this rhyme as 22839.

== Text ==
The wording of this nursery rhyme varies slightly from source to source.

The following is the text of "Arthur o' Bower" taken from its first appearance in print:

To be sung in a High Wind

Arthur o'Bower has broken his band,
He comes roaring up the land.
King of Scots with all his power
Cannot turn Arthur of the Bower.

== Origins and usage ==
The folklorists Iona and Peter Opie believed that "Arthur o' Bower" was a rhyme of some antiquity, arguing that there was a similarity – though this has been contested – to the opening lines of the ballad Robin Hood and the Tanner, printed c. 1650:

In Nottingham, there lives a jolly Tanner,
His name is Arthur a Bland:
There is never a 'Squire in Nottinghamshire
Dare bid bold Arthur stand.

They also compared this fragment of a Scottish ballad collected c. 1815:

The great Bull of Bendy law
Has broken his band and run awa,
And the king and a' his court
Canna turn that bull about.

They surmised that the name Bower was a corruption of the Scottish word Bowder, meaning "a blast or squall of wind".

William Wordsworth (1770–1850) wrote in 1823 that as a child he used to hear this rhyme "in the time of a high wind". An anonymous contributor to The Spectator in 1893 recalled that in the 1830s "Whenever we children were so happy as to be tearing about in a high wind, we shouted or sang ["Arthur o' Bower"] as we ran...In fact, it was an understood necessary accompaniment to the wind, and was sometimes performed swinging with the waving branches of a tree-top."

== Publication ==
In May 1804 Charles Lamb, having been enlisted by his friend Eliza Fenwick to find materials for a projected children's book, wrote to Wordsworth's sister Dorothy to ask if she could provide anything. In a now lost letter Dorothy sent Lamb a number of items, which Lamb duly acknowledged as "Arthur o' Bower and his brethren". The following year "Arthur" appeared under the imprint of the publisher Benjamin Tabart in Songs for the Nursery Collected from the Works of the Most Renowned Poets, one of the first anthologies of nursery rhymes, edited (presumably) by Fenwick and with illustrations by William Marshall Craig. "Arthur" was subsequently included in the anonymous Mother Goose's Quarto, or Melodies Complete (c. 1825), Robert Chambers' The Popular Rhymes of Scotland (1842), James Orchard Halliwell's The Nursery Rhymes of England (1846), and elsewhere.

== Interpretation ==
The central figure of the rhyme, Arthur o' Bower, has long been identified as King Arthur, perhaps in his aspect as a storm god. Alternatively, he may be King Arthur as the leader of the Wild Hunt, supernatural hunters in the night sky, belief in which apparently originated as an explanation for the weird noises made by high winds. King Arthur figures as a Wild Huntsman in the local folklore of various places in England, Scotland and France, and he has been recorded in this role since the 13th century. Robert Graves believed Arthur's Bower to be a pre-Christian Otherworld to which the souls of kings and heroes were conveyed after death.

== Influence and adaptations ==
An early adaptation of the rhyme came in the 1820s from Sir Walter Scott's grandson John Hugh Lockhart, then a child under five years old, who had witnessed a flood of the River Tweed. His version was later remembered as running

The waters of Tweed have broken the law,
And they've come roaring down the haugh.
Grandpapa and all his men
Cannot turn them back again.

In Beatrix Potter's 1903 children's picture book Tale of Squirrel Nutkin the title character recites "Arthur o' Bower".

W. H. Auden, in a commentary on his poem "Winds", the first of the Bucolics, wrote that "Arthur o'Bower as a name for the wind is taken from a nursery riddle".

Peter Warlock's set of twelve songs called Candlelight: A Cycle of Nursery Jingles, written in 1923 and published in 1924, includes a setting of "Arthur o' Bower", marked tumultuosissimamente (most tumultuously), the text of which was taken from Nurse Lovechild's Legacy (1916).
