= The King's Disguise, and Friendship with Robin Hood =

Traditional ballad

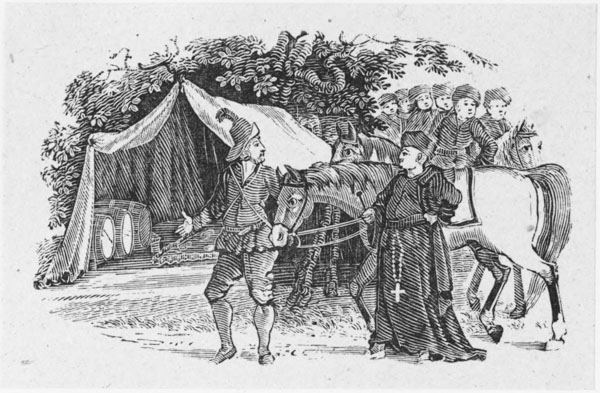
1885 illustration of the disguised king's visit

The King's Disguise, and Friendship with Robin Hood is an English ballad of Robin Hood. It is a relatively late work in the corpus, found in the Forresters Manuscript from the 1670s. The work seems loosely based on the 7th and 8th fyttes of A Gest of Robyn Hode which recounts the end of Robin Hood's outlawry after an encounter with the king. Unlike Gest, the king is not acting out of the need to suppress Robin; additionally, The King's Disguise and Friendship uses the 17th century updates to the legend that places Robin as contemporaneous with King Richard's reign. In the late 1800s, Francis James Child included it in his influential collection, the Child Ballads, as #151.

== Plot ==
'Well, Robin Hood,' then says the king,
'If I could thy pardon get,
To serve the king in every thing
Would'st thou thy mind firm set?'

'Yes, with all my heart', bold Robin said,
So they flung off their hoods;
To serve the king in every thing,
They swore they would spend their bloods.

— The King's Disguise, Stanzas 27–28

King Richard decides he must see Robin Hood and disguises himself as an abbot and his men as monks. Robin finds them and disbelieves him when he says they are royal messengers, but affirming he has done no harm to the innocent, brings them to an entertainment. They feed them and have an archery contest. The King asks if Robin could receive a pardon, would he serve the King? Robin says he would. The King reveals himself, they go to Nottingham to eat with the sheriff, and Robin goes to court to serve the King.

== Analysis ==
Joseph Ritson was dismissive of the literary merits of the ballad, writing in 1795 that the work seemed "to have been written by some miserable retainer to the press, merely to eke out the book; being, in fact, a most contemptible performance."

The final two lines of the work seem to segue into Robin Hood and the Valiant Knight (an account of Robin's death), although the "garlands" (collections) of Robin Hood tales that included this generally interposed Robin Hood and the Golden Arrow between this ballad and Valiant Knight. The Forresters Manuscript version of the ballad instead immediately launches into an account similar to that of the 8th fytte of A Gest of Robyn Hode which describes Robin's death at Kerklees (sic) Monastery.

Like many other Robin Hood ballads, the work adopts a rhyme scheme of ABCB that rhymes the second and fourth line of each stanza, also known as a ballad stanza. The melody it was sung to is unknown; the garland versions unhelpfully say "to a Northern Tune".

The historical King Richard really did move around in disguise while passing through Germany on his return from the Crusades, although his attempt to sneak through failed and he was held captive for a ransom.

== Adaptations ==
Many movie versions of the Robin Hood story conclude with the appearance of King Richard in disguise, returning from the Crusades.

This ballad was adapted into the final episode of the first season of the television series Robin of Sherwood. However, King Richard is portrayed more antagonistically in that version. Robin joins Richard's service, but Little John realizes that King Richard has little interest in Robin's advice and is treating him as a court jester. Robin is initially disbelieving, but when he speaks out against the King's plans to raise taxes for his war against Philip II of France, Richard decides he has gone too far, and Robin must escape from the King's assassins back to Sherwood Forest.
