= Piotr Müller =

Polish politician (born 1989)

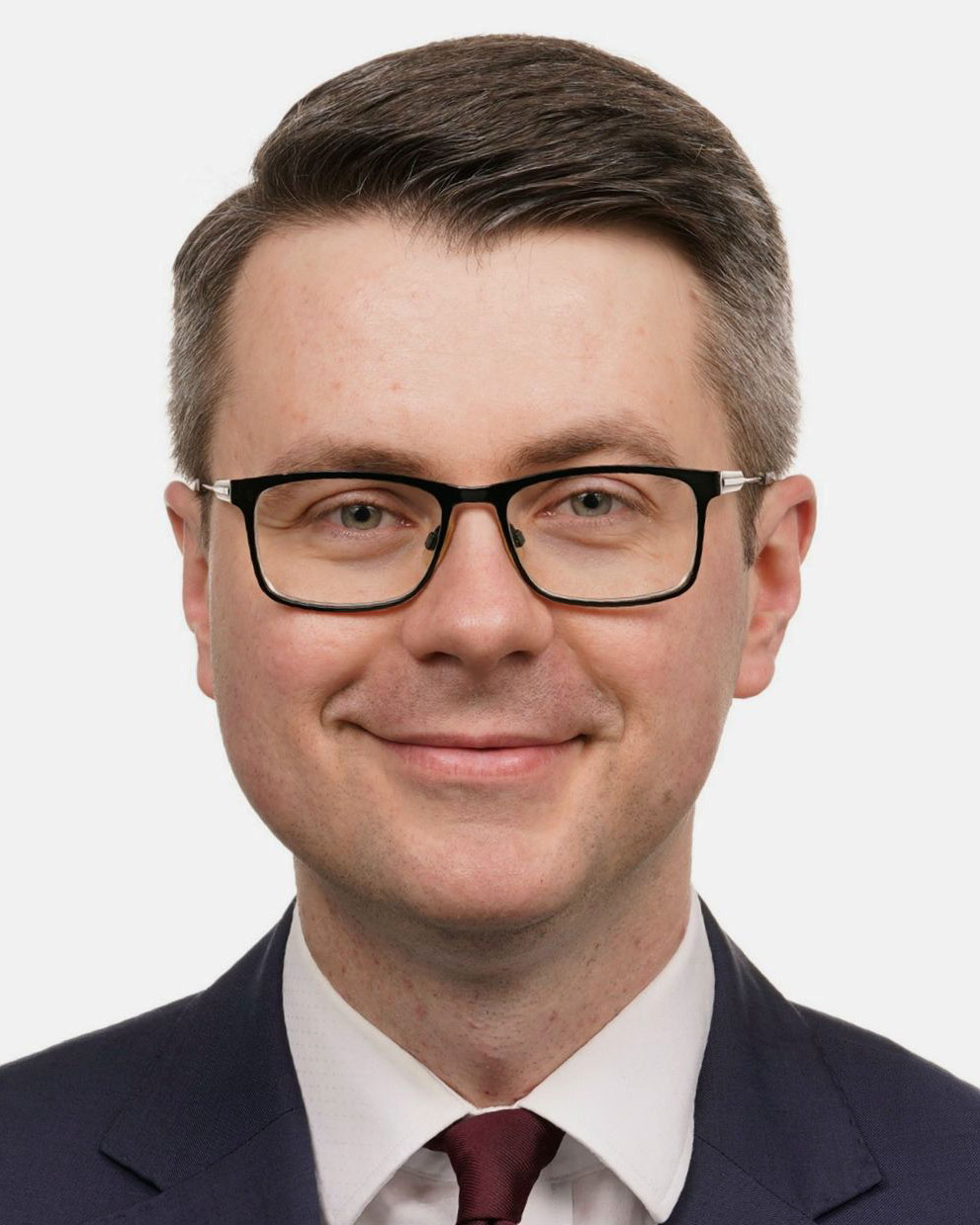

Member of the European Parliament from Poland

Personal details
- Born: Piotr Müller; 2 May 1989 (age 37) Słupsk, Poland
- Education: University of Warsaw
- Profession: politician, parliamentarian, lawyer

Piotr Józef Müller (born 2 May 1989 in Słupsk) is a Polish politician and lawyer, Undersecretary of State (2018) and Secretary of State (2019) at the Ministry of Science and Higher Education, member of the Standing Committee of the Council of Ministers, Deputy to the 8th and 9th term Sejm, government spokesman and Secretary of State at the Chancellery of the Prime Minister of Poland (2019-2023). He has been a Member of the European Parliament from Poland since July 2024.

== Career ==
Müller graduated from the Adam Mickiewicz Secondary School No. 2 in Słupsk. He was among the winners of a National School Contest on Knowledge about the European Union and National School Contest on Knowledge about Human Rights and finalists in the National School Contest on Knowledge about Poland and the Contemporary World and the National School Contest on History. He was a recipient of the Prime Minister and Minister of National Education scholarships, among others.

In 2016, he received his law degree at the University of Warsaw, where he studied as part of the College of Inter-area Individual Studies in the Humanities and Social Sciences. From 2010 to 2012 he served as the Chairman of the Student Government Board at the University of Warsaw. From 2013 to 2014, he was President of the Students’ Parliament of the Republic of Poland. From 2010 to 2014, Müller was a member of the Senate of the University of Warsaw, where he sat on the Budgetary and Finance Commission and the Legal and Statute Commission. He was a member of the Disciplinary Committee for academic teachers’ affairs at the General Council of Science and Higher Education and served as an expert at the Polish Accreditation Committee, while in the years 2013–2014, he also belonged to the board of this Committee. From 2012 to 2016, he was a member of the Board of the University of Warsaw Foundation. Between 2017 and 2018, he taught classes at the Institute of Political Sciences at the University of Warsaw.

He joined the Law and Justice party. In 2011 and 2015, he pursued a seat in the Sejm of the Republic of Poland from this party’s list of candidates, but did not win a seat.

From November 2015 to April 2017, he was an advisor to Deputy Prime Minister Jarosław Gowin, and then became Director of the Minister’s Office at the Ministry of Science and Higher Education. From February 2017, he belonged to the legislative team in charge of preparing an act to reform the science and higher education system. On 15 January 2017, he became Undersecretary of State at the Ministry of Science and Higher Education; he was entrusted with such tasks as coordinating objectives related to the government administration department for higher education, including the supervision of universities and supervision of legislative work. In 2018, he was appointed to head the science and higher education reform implementation team. He also became a member of the Standing Committee of the Council of Ministers and the Social Committee of the Council of Ministers.

In December 2018, he was given the opportunity to take over a seat in the Sejm following the death of Jolanta Szczypińska and resignation submitted by Piotr Karczewski, to which he agreed. He took the Sejm Deputy’s oath on 28 December 2018. On 7 January 2019, he was appointed as Secretary of State at the Ministry of Science and Higher Education; he also became a member of existing committees within the Council of Ministers.

In the 2019 European Parliament election, he failed to obtain an MEP seat in the constituency covering the Pomeranian Voivodeship. On 4 June 2019, Prime Minister Mateusz Morawiecki appointed him as the government spokesman and Secretary of State at the Chancellery of the Prime Minister.

In the election held that year, he succeeded in becoming re-elected as a Sejm Deputy by receiving 26,892 votes. In November 2019, after the appointment of the government of the same Prime Minister, Mateusz Morawiecki once again appointed him as the government spokesman and Secretary of State at the Chancellery of the Prime Minister. He became a permanent member of government delegations led by the Prime Minister during foreign visits. He participated in meetings with Joe Biden, Mike Pence, Kamala Harris, Mike Pompeo, Emmanuel Macron, Angela Merkel, Olaf Scholz, Justin Trudeau, Boris Johnson, Giorgia Meloni, Volodymyr Zelenskyy, Mark Rutte and others.

In the 2023 elections, he was re-elected as a Sejm Deputy, receiving 72,813 votes. In December 2023, he concluded his duties in government administration. In the 2024 elections, he was elected as a Member of the European Parliament for the 10th term. In the European Parliament, he served on the Committee on the Internal Market and Consumer Protection, where he became coordinator for the European Conservatives and Reformists group. In April 2026, he co-founded the Rozwój Plus association, established by Mateusz Morawiecki, and in September of the same year, co-founded its delegation within the ECR Group in the European Parliament, becoming its chair.

== Awards and distinctions ==
In 2019, he was ranked as one of the 50 most influential Polish lawyers of the preceding year in a list prepared by the Dziennik Gazeta Prawna newspaper.

== Personal life ==
He is the son of Edward Müller. He was born in Słupsk.
