= Robin Hood Rescuing Three Squires =

Traditional song

Robin Hood Rescuing Three Squires or Robin Hood and the Widow's Three Sons is a traditional ballad about Robin Hood, listed as Child ballad 140 and Roud 70.

== Synopsis ==
Robin meets an old woman lamenting that her sons will hang for poaching the king's deer. He persuades an old man to trade his ragged clothing for Robin's fine clothes, and in this disguise, offers to be the sheriff's hangman. He blows on his horn, and his men arrive. In some variants, they hang the sheriff instead of the three young men; in all, they all escape back to the greenwood.

== Influences ==
Francis James Child believed this to be the source of Robin Hood Rescuing Will Stutly.

== Adaptations ==
Howard Pyle retold this story in The Merry Adventures of Robin Hood with the hero as Little John; he used trickery to get the three young men away, and his bow broke, resulting in his own capture. Robin Hood, having just killed Guy of Gisbourne, disguises himself as Guy to carry out the rescue.

== See also ==
- Robin Hood and the Beggar, I
