= Frederic William Madden =

English numismatist and librarian

- Born: 9 April 1839; British Museum, London
- Died: 21 June 1904 (aged 65)

Frederic William Madden (9 April 1839 – 21 June 1904), son of Frederic Madden, was an employee of the British Museum and an authority on Roman, Jewish and Christian numismatics.

== Biography ==
Madden was born in the British Museum on 9 April 1839. He attended Merchant Taylors', St Paul's and Charterhouse Schools. He became an assistant in the Department of Coins and Medals at the British Museum in 1861, and remained there until 1868. He resigned under a cloud, after an investigation of his sale of duplicate Roman coins in a donation by Edward Wigan.

Madden then worked on various International Exhibitions. In 1874 he became Secretary and Librarian to Brighton College, and from 1888 to 1902 he was Chief Librarian of the Public Library in Brighton.

He died at Holt Lodge, Brighton on 21 June 1904.

== Numismatics ==
Madden joined the Royal Numismatic Society in 1858, became Secretary in 1860, and was a joint editor of its journal, the Numismatic Chronicle, from 1860 to 1868. He was especially associated with research on Jewish, Christian and Roman coins. He was a member of the Royal Asiatic Society from 1877, and belonged also to American learned societies.

== Publications ==
- The Handbook of Roman Numismatics (1861)
- The History of Jewish Coinage and Money in the Old and New Testaments (1864)
- The Coins of the Jews (1881)
