= Josiah Forshall =

English librarian (1795–1863)

Josiah Forshall (29 March 1795 – 18 December 1863) was an English librarian.

== Life ==
Forshall was born at Witney, Oxfordshire on 29 March 1795, the eldest son of Samuel Forshall. He received education at the grammar schools of Exeter and Chester, and in 1814 entered Exeter College, Oxford. He graduated B.A. in 1818, taking a first class in mathematics and a second in literae humaniores. He became M.A. in 1821, and was elected fellow and tutor of his college.

Forshall was appointed an assistant librarian in the manuscript department of the British Museum in 1824, and became keeper of that department in 1827. In 1828 he was elected a Fellow of the Royal Society.

In 1828 Forshall was appointed secretary to the Museum, and in 1837 resigned his keepership in order to devote himself exclusively to his secretarial duties. He was examined before the select committee appointed to inquire into the Museum in 1835–6, and made revelations on the subject of patronage. As secretary he had much influence with the trustees. He was opposed to any attempts to make the Museum more accessible.

About 1850 Forshall retired from the museum on account of ill-health. After his resignation he lived in retirement, spending much of his time, until his death, at the Foundling Hospital, of which he had been appointed chaplain in 1829.

== Family ==
On 17 July 1826 the Rev. Josiah Forshall, M.A. Fellow of Exeter College, Oxford married Francis Smith, the only daughter of Richard Smith of Harborne Heath near Birmingham, at Edgbaston, Warwickshire.

On the 1841 and 1851 census, the family were living at the British Museum. Their children were:

- William Hayes Forshall, baptised 1827 Edgbaston. Ensign William Hayes Forshall cashiered from the 4th Regiment of N.I. in 1851 at Court Martial in Rawul Pindee, India.
- Frederick Hale Forshall (1829 - 1901) Classical tutor, 1858 married Eliza Amelia Bucquet in Westminster
- Edward Vaughan Forshall (c.1832 - 1891) Schoolmaster, 1876 married Annabella Gibson/Paton/Hardyman in Armagh
- Francis Hyde Forshall (1833 - 1907) General Practitioner, 1866 married Frances M. Scrimgeour in Edmonton, London
- Frances Mary Forshall born c.1836, died in Nice, France c.1896-1900

Josiah Forshall died at his house in Woburn Place, London, on 18 December 1863, after undergoing a surgical operation. He was buried at the Foundling Hospital chapel beside his wife Frances (1795 - 1865).

== Works ==
Forshall edited the catalogue of the manuscripts in the British Museum (new series): pt. i. the Arundel MSS.; pt. ii. the Burney MSS.; pt. iii. index, 1834, &c. fol., and also the Catalogus Codicum Manuscriptorum Orientalium: Pars Prima Codices Syriacos et Carshunicos amplectens, 1838, &c. fol. He also edited the Description of the Greek Papyri in the Brit. Mus., pt. i. 1839, 8vo.

In 1850 he published a pamphlet entitled Misrepresentations of H.M. Commissioners [who inquired into the British Museum in 1848–9] exposed. He published with Frederic Madden The Holy Bible … in the earliest English Versions made by John Wycliffe and his followers, 1850, 4 vols., a work of two decades. He also published editions of the Gospels of St. Mark (1862), St. Luke (1860), and St. John (1859), arranged in parts and sections, and some sermons. His works The Lord's Prayer with various readings and critical notes (1864), and The First Twelve Chapters of … St. Matthew in the received Greek text, with readings and notes, 1864, were published posthumously.
