= Eric Julius Biörner =

18th-century Swedish scholar and historian

- Born: 22 July 1696; Timrå parish, Medelpad, Sweden
- Died: 1750 (aged 53–54)
- Other name: Erik Julius Björner
- Occupations: State official, antiquarian, historian
- Known for: Studies of Sweden's ancient history; translations of Icelandic sagas
- Spouse: Ebba Hadelin

Academic background
- Education: Uppsala University

Academic work
- Notable works: Nordiska kämpa dater, i en sagoflock samlade om forna kongar och hjältar (1737)

Eric Julius Biörner (modern Swedish spelling Erik Julius Björner) was born on 22 July 1696 in the Swedish parish of Timrå in Medelpad and died in 1750. He was a state official and a scholar of ancient history.

== Biography ==
The son of the sheriff Mauritz Björner and Anna Katarina Teet, Biörner began to study at Uppsala University in 1715. Biörner was a faithful disciple of Olaus Rudbeck and his teachings about Sweden's ancient history, which Peter Fjagesund has characterised as an 'ambitious and highly speculative project of constructing a heroic national past' for Sweden. In 1717, when he was 21, Biörner published a fifty-page, Latin dissertation entitled De Suedia boreali ('About Northern Sweden'). This 'discusses the ancient history of the areas around the Bay of Bothnia, including Finland and northern Norway, connecting their population not just with the Goths and the Vikings, but also with the Flood and with Japheth, Noah's son, often regarded as the father of all Europeans'. This was highly regarded, and Biörner won the favour of another disciple of Rudbeck's, Johan Peringskiöld, then the Chief Inspector of ancient monuments and historical buildings. Biörner became a clerk at the Stockholm Antikvitetskollegium.

On the death of Johan Peringskiöld's son Johan Fredrik Peringskiöld in 1725, Biörner was promoted first to secretary and then, in 1738, to assessor. He was a committed antiquarian and in his younger years toured Medelpad, Ångermanland and Hälsingland to sketch and describe ancient finds and rune stones. He then worked as a translator and translated a large number of Icelandic sagas into Swedish, since these were then considered one of the main sources for Sweden's early history. In time, however, Biörner was increasingly isolated in his credulous ideas about Sweden's past; one of his main critics was the historian Olof von Dalin.

Biörner married Ebba Hadelin on 2 April 1734, but the marriage was childless. His most famous work is probably his Nordiska kämpa dater, i en sagoflock samlade om forna kongar och hjältar (1737), an edition and translation of a large number of Old Icelandic chivalric sagas and legendary sagas.
