= Robin Hood and the Tinker =

Traditional song

Robin Hood and the Tinker (Roud 3982, Child 127) is an English-language folk song, part of the Robin Hood canon.

== Synopsis ==
Robin Hood meets with a tinker and tells him that two tinkers were put in the stocks for drinking ale and beer. The tinker tells him that he has a warrant for Robin Hood in his pouch. Robin tells him to come with him to Nottingham. They stop at an inn to drink. When the tinker is drunk, Robin takes the warrant and his money and leaves the tinker with the bill. The host tells him that the man he drank with was Robin Hood. The tinker starts tracking him down and fights with him, but when he is winning, he lets Robin blow on his horn. This summons Robin's men and ends the fight. Robin offers him a hundred pounds to join the band.

== Adaptions ==
Howard Pyle included this story in his Merry Adventures of Robin Hood.
