= The Noble Fisherman =

17th-century ballad of Robin Hood

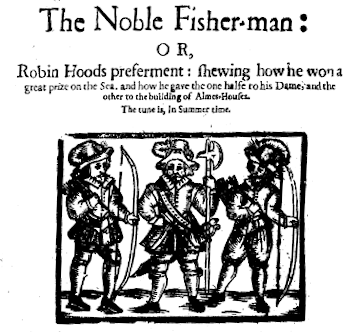
A 17th-century broadsheet preserved by the Bodleian Library

The Noble Fisherman, also known as Robin Hood's Preferment and Robin Hood's Fishing, is a 17th-century ballad of Robin Hood. Unusually, it depicts Robin Hood as a hero of the sea, rather than his usual portrayal as someone who operated in the greenwood forest. It seems to have been quite popular for the first two centuries of its existence, although it eventually lost prominence and was less used in adaptations of Robin Hood from the 19th and 20th centuries. It was later published by Francis James Child in the 1880s as Child Ballad #148 in his influential collection of popular ballads.

Robin Hood's Bay in the Borough of Scarborough may have been an inspiration for the writer of the ballad.

== Plot ==
'The fisherman brave more mony have
Then any merchant, two, or three;
Therefore I will to Scarborough goe,
That I a fisherman may be.'

— The Noble Fisherman, Stanza 3

Robin Hood decides to go to sea and try his hand at being a fisherman. He poses as a poor fisherman and calls himself Simon Over-The-Lee. In Scarborough, North Yorkshire, he meets a widow with an inn by the sea and her own boat. She hires him and hopes that he will live up to his namesake (Simon Peter, a fisherman). The ship's Master initially is unimpressed with the new hire. The crew laughs at him as an obvious "lubber" whose seamanship is at novice level.

"Simon" spies a French warship, presumably either pirates or privateers. While the Master initially despairs at the prospect of being taken into French captivity, Simon insists he be allowed to defend the ship with his bow. Simon shoots the French pirates using his archery skills. Instead of the French boarding the fishing boat, the fishermen board the French ship, where everyone is already dead from Simon's arrows. They find a treasure hoard of twelve thousand pounds aboard the French warship. Initially, Simon says he will take half for his "dame" (the widow who hired him, as she is called a dame earlier) and offers to share the other half of the treasure with the others on the boat. The Master refuses and insists that the treasure is all Robin's. Robin vows to use it to build a habitation for the oppressed where they can live in peace.

== Analysis ==
A ballad titled "The Noble Fisherman, or, Robin Hoods great Prize" is listed in the Stationers' Register as from June 1631, and was presumably this ballad. The oldest surviving copy is also probably from the 1630s, now kept in the Bodleian Library collection. Many late 17th-century broadside copies exist and the ballad was commonly included in the garlands (collections) of Robin Hood ballads of the 17th and 18th centuries, suggesting the work's popularity. The ballad's writing style suggests it was written by a professional ballad writer inventing a tale that combined England's famous hero with the then popular genre of stories involving a victory over a hated foreign enemy in the French, making it unlikely the tale originated from an older medieval popular tradition, and certainly not an actual historical incident. The ballad is also unusual in placing Robin Hood in Scarborough, which also probably reflects its later date of composition; the earliest legends kept Robin Hood firmly within a Yorkshire or Nottinghamshire forest.

In the alternate broadside title of Robin Hood's Preferment, "Preferment" loosely implies "professional advancement" as Robin is doing something new.

The story may have been influenced or partially inspired by tales of Eustace the Monk, another medieval outlaw who had nautical adventures. Stephen Knight and Thomas Ohlgren consider the structure of the story as being similar to Robin Hood and the Potter, with the widow replacing the role of the sheriff's wife in Potter.

Like many ballads of Robin Hood, the work adopts a rhyme scheme of ABCB that rhymes the second and fourth line of each stanza, also known as a ballad stanza.

The setup to the story depicts Robin Hood as considering fishing a potentially well-paying job. This may be wishful thinking from the ballad's writer who clearly admired sailors, as "outlaw" was a very lucrative trade provided they did not get caught, hence why people considered it at all. Even if Robin Hood had wished to try going legitimate, a good archer in medieval armies could earn twice as much as a medieval sailor.

The tune of the ballad, identified by its opening line "In summer time, when leaves grow green", is the same as one broadsheet version of Robin Hood and the Curtal Friar, as well as Robin Hood and the Tinker. Similar opening lines about the forest in the summer, if not necessarily the same tune, occur in Robin Hood and the Monk, Robin Hood and Guy of Gisborne, and Robin Hood and the Potter.

While the work was quite popular for a solid two centuries, it declined in prominence afterward. James Holt contemptuously wrote that the story was a "trivial romance", a "passing fancy", and "had very little permanent impact on the legend". Francis Child called the ballad somewhat "infantile" by his era's standards, but acknowledged that it clearly found an audience during its time.

== See also ==
- List of the Child Ballads
