= Little John a Begging =

Traditional song

"Little John A Begging" (Roud 3988, Child 142) is an English folk song about Robin Hood. It exists in two variants, one fragmentary.

== Synopsis ==
In one variant, Robin Hood sends Little John out, disguised as a beggar. In the fragmentary one, Little John apparently exchanges clothing with a beggar, as the surviving ballads opens with his complaint that they do not fit. In both variants, he meets up with beggars who realize that he is not one of their company. They fight, and Little John wins.

The fragmented version breaks off there, but in the complete one, Little John discovers they were carrying a great deal of money and takes it.

== Adaptations ==
Howard Pyle, in his The Merry Adventures of Robin Hood, transferred this adventure to Robin.
