= Frederic Madden =

English palaeographer (1801–1873)

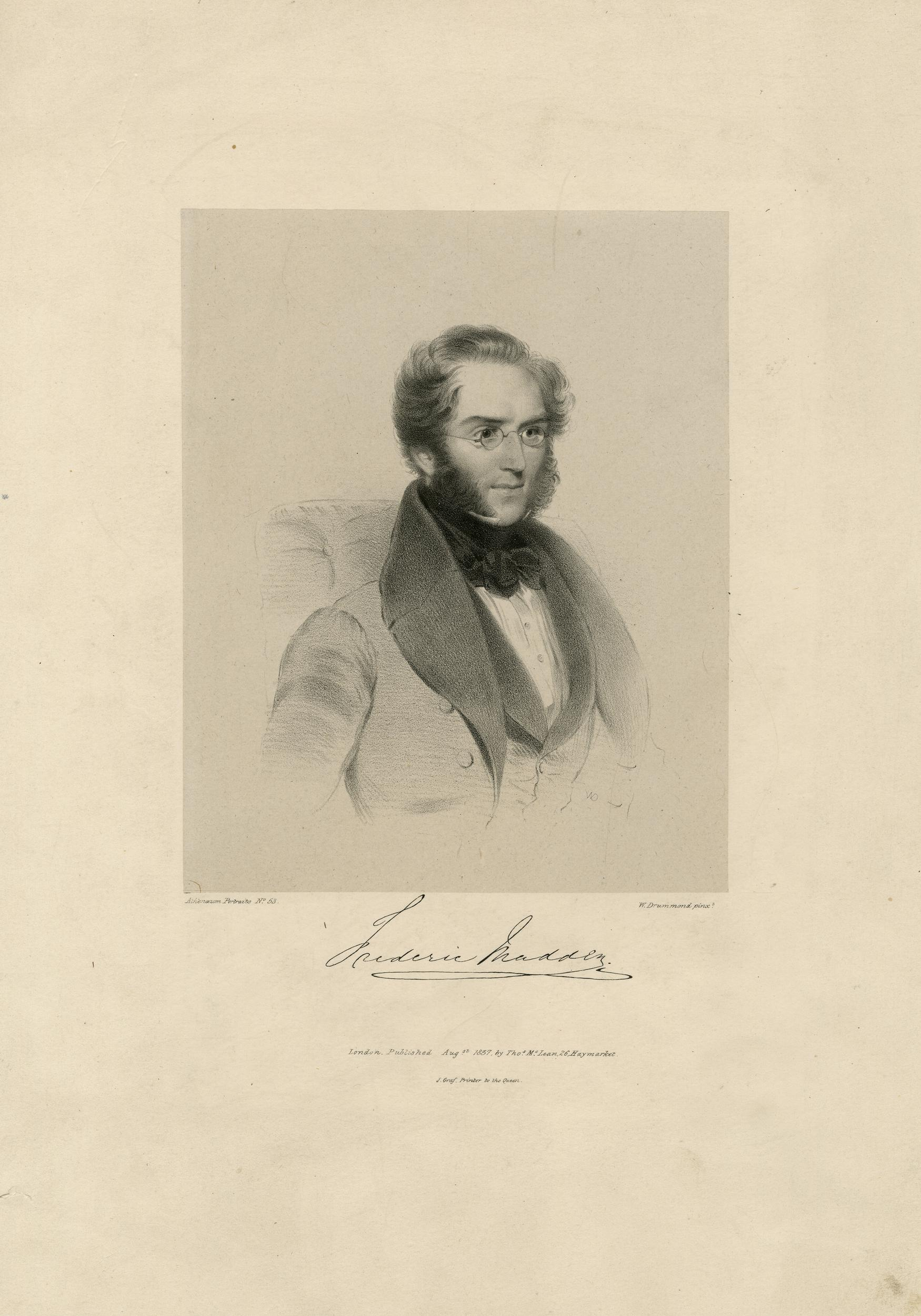
- Occupation: Keeper of Manuscripts
- Employer: British Museum
- Known for: paleography

Sir Frederic Madden KH (16 February 1801 – 8 March 1873) was an English palaeographer and librarian.

== Biography ==
Born in Portsmouth, he was the son of William John Madden (1757–1833), a captain in the Royal Marines of Irish origin, and his wife Sarah Carter (1759–1833). From his childhood he displayed a flair for linguistic and antiquarian studies. In 1826 he was engaged by the British Museum to assist in the preparation of the classified catalogue of printed books, and in 1828 he became assistant keeper of manuscripts. In 1832 he was elected a Fellow of the Royal Society. At the age of 32 he was made a knight, entitling him to the initials KH after his name. In 1837 he succeeded Josiah Forshall as Keeper of Manuscripts. He did not get on well with his colleagues, notably Anthony Panizzi, and retired in 1866.

Madden was the leading palaeographer of his day. However, his ignorance of German prevented his ranking high as a philologist, although he paid much attention to the early dialectical forms of French and English. His minor contributions to antiquarian research were numerous: the best known, perhaps, was his dissertation on the spelling of Shakespeare's name, which, mainly on the strength of a signature found in John Florio's copy of the work of Montaigne, he contended should be "Shakspere". This led to a lengthy debate and to a period when the "Shakspere" spelling nearly became the norm.

On his death at his home in St Stephen's Square, London, he bequeathed his journals and other private papers to the Bodleian Library, where they were to remain unopened until 1920.

== Scholarship ==
He edited for the Roxburghe Club Havelok the Dane (1828), discovered by himself among the Laudian manuscripts in the Bodleian Library, William and the Werwolf (1832) and the old English versions of the Gesta Romanorum (1838). In 1839 he edited the ancient metrical romances of Syr Gawayne for the Bannatyne Club, and in 1847 Layamon's Brut, with a prose translation, for the Society of Antiquaries.

In 1850 the magnificent edition, in parallel columns, of what are known as the "Wycliffite" versions of the Bible, from the original manuscripts, upon which he and his coadjutor, Josiah Forshall, had been engaged for twenty years, was published by the University of Oxford.

In 1866–69 he edited the Historia Minor of Matthew Paris for the Rolls Series. In 1833 he wrote the text of Henry Shaw's Illuminated Ornaments of the Middle Ages; and in 1850 he edited the English translation of Joseph Balthazar Silvestre's Paléographie universelle.

He was one of the three contributors to Collectanea Topographica et Genealogica.

== Conservation ==
In April 1837, when still the Assistant Keeper of Manuscripts, Madden was shown a garret of the old museum building which contained a large number of burnt and damaged fragments and codices of vellum manuscripts. Madden immediately identified them as part of the Cotton library collection, which had been badly damaged in a fire of 1731.

During his tenure as Keeper of Manuscripts, Madden undertook extensive conservation work on the Cotton manuscripts (often in the face of opposition from the museum's board, who deemed the enterprise prohibitively expensive). In collaboration with the bookbinder Henry Gough, he developed a conservation strategy that restored even the most badly damaged fragments and manuscripts to a usable state. Vellum sheets were cleaned and flattened and mounted in paper frames. Where possible, they were rebound in their original codices.

As well as the fragments found in the garret, he carried out conservation work on the rest of the collection. Many manuscripts had become brittle and fragile, including the codex that contains the only known copy of Beowulf (Cotton Vittelius A xv). By 1845, the work was largely complete, though Madden was to suffer one more setback when a fire broke out in the museum bindery, destroying completely some further works from the collection.

== Family ==
He married Mary Layton in 1829. She died in childbirth in 1830 and the child, a boy, died.

In the summer of 1837 in the district of Edmonton, then in Middlesex, he married Emily Sarah Robinson (1813–1873). She was the daughter of William Robinson (1777–1848), lawyer and historian of Tottenham, and his wife Mary Ridge (1781–1856), daughter of the Chichester banker William Ridge. Some sources suggest that William Robinson was the illegitimate son of Anne Nelson, unmarried sister of Horatio Nelson, 1st Viscount Nelson.

Frederic and Emily had six known children. The eldest child was Frederic William Madden (1839–1904), who in 1860 married Elizabeth Sarah Rannie (1839–1893) and had four children. Frederic, a numismatist of note, was Secretary and Bursar of Brighton College 1874–88 and then Chief Librarian of the Public Library in Brighton 1888–1902. His daughter Emily Mary Madden (born 1848) is noted for a sketchbook she kept between 1856 and 1859 devoted to her pet cat, Mouton. The drawings depict the animal in a variety of imaginative scenes, including dancing, dueling, riding horses, and appearing in costume alongside other animals.

== Works ==
- The Diaries of Sir Frederic Madden [1819-1873] were microfilmed by Oxford University Press from the original mss. in the Bodleian Library (MSS. Eng. hist. c. 140-182). The reel includes the author's own indexes to his journals for the years 1819-1826.
- Madden, F. (1832). "Historical remarks on the introduction of the game of chess into Europe and on the ancient chessmen discovered in the Isle of Lewis." Archaeologia, 24, 203–291.
- Madden, Frederic, and T. D. Rogers. 1980. Sir Frederic Madden at Cambridge : Extracts from Madden’s Diaries 1831, 1838, 1841-2, 1846, 1859 and 1863. Cambridge [Cambridgeshire]: Published for the Cambridge Bibliographical Society by Cambridge University Library.

With Forshall:

- The Holy Bible, containing the Old and New Testaments, with the Apocryphal books, in the earliest English versions made from the Latin Vulgate by John Wycliffe and his followers, (1850)

As editor:

- Syr Gawayne; a Collection of ancient Romance-Poems, by Scotish and English Authors, relating to that Celebrated Knight of the Round Table, with an Introduction, Notes, and a Glossary. London, 1839 (Google Books)
