= Arthur a Bland =

Character in English folklore

Arthur a Bland is, in English folklore, a member of Robin Hood's Merry Men, though his chief appearance is in the ballad in which he joins the band. Arthur a Bland is also the name of an ex British Waterways tug.

== Plays ==
Arthur a Bland appears in "Robin Hood" by Larry Blamire, where he is there with Robin and the other soon to be merrymen after the ransacking of the Blue Boar Inn.

== Ballads ==
Arthur a Bland appears in one ballad in the Child collection, Robin Hood and the Tanner. He is going through Sherwood when Robin accuses him of poaching. When they fight and Arthur beats Robin, Robin invites him to join the band. In some versions, he is Little John's cousin.

== Mummer's Plays ==
In English Mummer's Plays, Arthur a Bland's fight with Robin is incorporated into the general fight/death/healed setting. Most of the lines derive from the ballad, though there seems to be material from Robin Hood and the Shepherd mixed in. The lines of the Mummer's Play versions tend to be less refined than the Childe Ballads, perhaps indicating a more original type of language.

For instance, when Robin Hood has been beaten by Arthur, Little John comes over the hill and Robin tells him what has happened:

Childe's version:

"O what is the matter?" then said Little John,
"Master, I pray you tell;
Why do you stand with your staff in your hand?
I fear all is not well."

"O man, I do stand, and he makes me to stand,
The tanner that stands thee beside;
He is a bonny blade, and master of his trade,
For soundly he hath tanned my hide."

Mummer's Play version:

"What is the matter master?
Pray unto me tell
To see you stand
Your staff in hand
I fear it's all not well."

"This tanner he stands he makes me to stand
He's the tanner-hood that stand by my side
He's a bonny blade o his master's trade
So well he a'tanned me hide."

== Later adaptations ==
The story reappeared in later versions. Howard Pyle in his The Merry Adventures of Robin Hood set the bout between Little John and Arthur a Bland, and had Arthur appear in various later adventures as a minor character.
