= Edward Müller =

Polish politician and trade unionist

Member of Sejm 1991-1993
- In office November 25, 1991 – May 31, 1993

Personal details
- Born: 1958 (age 67–68)
- Party: Solidarity

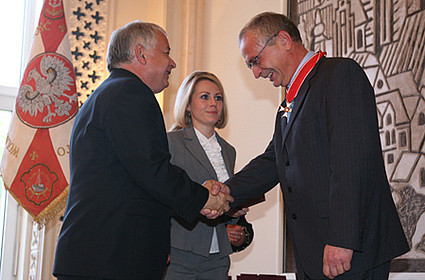
President Lech Kaczyński decorated Edward Müller with the Commander's Cross Polonia Restituta

Edward Ryszard Müller (born 13 October 1958 in Gdańsk) is a Polish politician, a trade union activist; he was an oppositionist in the People's Republic of Poland and from 1989 to 1993 a deputy of the Contract Sejm and the First Term Sejm.

== Biography ==
In 1977 he graduated from Basic Vocational School of Ship Industry. In 1980 he joined NSZZ "Solidarity". Before he moved to Słupsk in September 1980, he had been living in Gdańsk. After introducing Martial law in Poland he organised underground structures of Solidarity' within Słupsk Voivodeship. He was also a member of Regional Resistance Committee in Słupsk (Okręgowy Komitet Oporu) (1982) as well as of secret enterprise resistance committee in confectionery industry plants ZPC Pomorzanka (1981–1985), both in Słupsk.

In January 1982 he was dismissed for disciplinary reasons and in autumn he was interned in military camp in Chełmno, where he was sentenced to one year and eight months of detention. In February 1985 he was rearrested, imprisoned in penitentiary at Rakowiecka street in Warsaw, sentenced to one year and two months of detention and released in November 1985. Subsequently, he began to cooperate with The Liberal Democratic Party ‘Independency’ (Liberalno-Demokratyczna Partia "Niepodległość"). With his jump from the first stock, he avoided another arrest in spring 1986. A wanted notice was issued for him, however in autumn 1986 he decided to use general amnesty.

In 1987, in Poland he established the cooperation with Helsinki Committee (Komitet Helsiński). Simultaneously, he led the Koszalin-Słupsk Inter-Regional Middle-Pomerania Coordination Committee (Międzyregionalna Komisja Koordynacyjna Pomorza Środkowego Koszalin-Słupsk - MKKPŚ Koszalin-Słupsk). Between 1986 and 1989 he was chairman of the Słupsk Inter-Enterprise Coordination Committee (Międzyzakładowa Komisja Koordynacyjna Miasta Słupska - MKK Słupsk). In late 1980s he was publishing Pobudka (magazine for Polish combatants) and OKO (bulletin of MKK Słupsk, later: MKKPŚ Koszalin-Słupsk). Additionally, he was editing magazines Ucho and Rewers as well as he was organizing summer camps for children of victimized underground activists.

As one of the authorised, he reregistered NSZZ Solidarity on 17 April 1989. He was chairman of the Temporary Boar in Słupsk Region (Tymczasowy Zarząd Regionu Słupskiego), afterward, until 1990, he was a member of the Executive National Committee (Krajowa Komisja Wykonawcza) and he led the Board in Słupsk Region (Zarząd Regionu Słupskiego) until 1994. At the same time, he was a member of National Committee ( Komisja Krajowa). In May 1989 he discovered a transmitter in the Citizens’ Committee (Komitet Obywatelski) tapped by SB (Służba Bezpieczeństwa).

He was a deputy of the Contract Sejm from Citizens’ Committee (a member of Administration and Interior Committee and Extraordinary Committee for analysing the activity of the Ministry of Internal Affairs) and of the First Term Sejm from the Solidarity list of Słupsk Region (again a member of Administration and Interior Committee and National Defense Committee). In 1996 and 1997 he led the Movement for the Reconstruction of Poland (Ruch Odbudowy Polski) on regional level

== Awards and decorations ==
In 2001 he was decorated by Minister of Culture and National Heritage with the ‘Merited for Culture’ medal (odznaka Zasłużonego Działacza Kultury). 31 August 2009 President Lech Kaczyński decorated him with the Commander's Cross of the Polonia Restituta for outstanding contribution in his work for democratic change in Poland. Institute of National Remembrance confer him victim status.

== Notes ==
- Edward Müller - parliamentary page
- Encyclopedia of Solidarity
- Nasi w Sejmie i w Senacie. Posłowie i senatorowie wybrani z listy Solidarności, Volumen, Warszawa 1990
