= Robin Hood's Progress to Nottingham =

Traditional song

"Robin Hood's Progress to Nottingham" (Roud 1790, Child 139) is an English-language folk song and part of the Robin Hood canon. This song has survived as, among other forms, a late 17th-century English broadside ballad, and is one of several ballads about the medieval folk hero that form part of the Child ballad collection, which is one of the most comprehensive collections of traditional English ballads. It provides an origin story for Robin.

== Synopsis ==
Tall, brave, fifteen-year-old Robin Hood sets out to Nottingham to dine and drink beer, ale, and wine with the general of Nottingham and fifteen of the King's foresters, and also to compete in an archery contest. When Robin arrives and announces his eagerness to compete, the foresters are scornful that someone so young should think himself fit to shoot in front of the king, assuming that he isn't strong enough to shoot a bow and arrow well. Robin wagers for twenty marks that he can shoot a hart at a hundred rods. Although Robin accomplishes the feat, the foresters refuse to pay. Out of vengeance, Robin rides out into the plain and shoots fourteen of the foresters. He then captures the surviving forester and shoots an arrow into his head as final proof of his prowess as an archer. The people of Nottingham come running out into the field, hoping to take Robin Hood along with the fifteen slain foresters, but many are maimed by Robin's arrows, and he flees into the forest before they can capture him. The villagers carry the bodies of the foresters back to Nottingham and bury them in a row in the churchyard.

This version of the tale is similar to one told in the late-16th-century Sloane Life of Robin Hood, which is probably derived from a lost earlier version of the ballad. The Sloane version makes Robin Hood's actions more explicable and less gratuitously bloodthirsty; the foresters bet their money against Robin Hood's "head" or life, and one of them tries to put him off his aim. Having won the wager, Robin waives the debt for all of the foresters except that one, suggesting that they drink the money together. This is not good enough for the foresters and the quarrel develops with fatal results for them. The Sloane account, unlike the extant ballad, makes no mention of the general mayhem of Nottingham townspeople.

== Historical and cultural significance ==
This ballad is part of a group of ballads about Robin Hood that in turn, like many of the popular ballads collected by Francis James Child, were in their time considered a threat to the Protestant religion. Puritan writers, like Edward Dering writing in 1572, considered such tales "'childish follye'" and "'witless devices.'" Writing of the Robin Hood ballads after A Gest of Robyn Hode, their Victorian collector Francis Child claimed that variations on the "'Robin met with his match'" theme, such as this ballad, are "sometimes wearisome, sometimes sickening," and that "a considerable part of the Robin Hood poetry looks like char-work done for the petty press, and should be judged as such." Child had also called the Roxburghe and Pepys collections (in which some of these ballads are included) "'veritable dung-hills [...], in which only after a great deal of sickening grubbing, one finds a very moderate jewel.'"

However, as folklorist and ethnomusicologist Mary Ellen Brown has pointed out, Child's denigration of the later Robin Hood ballads is evidence of an ideological view he shared with many other scholars of his time who wanted to exclude cheap printed ballads such as these from their pedigree of the oral tradition and early literature. Child and others were reluctant to include such broadsides in their collections because they thought they "regularized the text, rather than reflecting and/or participating in tradition, which fostered multiformity." On the other hand, the broadsides are significant in themselves as showing, as English jurist and legal scholar John Selden (1584–1654) puts it, "'how the wind sits. As take a straw and throw it up in the air; you shall see by that which way the wind is, which you shall not do by casting up a stone. More solid things do not show the complexion of the times so well as ballads and libels.'" Even though the broadsides are cultural ephemera, unlike weightier tomes, they are important because they are markers of contemporary "current events and popular trends." It has been speculated that in his time Robin Hood represented a figure of peasant revolt, but the English medieval historian J. C. Holt has argued that the tales developed among the gentry, that he is a yeoman rather than a peasant, and that the tales do not mention peasants' complaints, such as oppressive taxes.

Moreover, he does not seem to rebel against societal standards but to uphold them by being munificent, devout, and affable. Other scholars have seen the literature around Robin Hood as reflecting the interests of the common people against feudalism. The latter interpretation supports Selden's view that popular ballads provide a valuable window onto the thoughts and feelings of the common people on topical matters: for the peasantry, Robin Hood may have been a redemptive figure.

== Library and archival holdings ==
The English Broadside Ballad Archive at the University of California, Santa Barbara holds five 17th-century broadside ballad versions of this tale: one in the Euing collection at the Glasgow University Library (306), another in the Pepys collection at Magdalene College at the University of Cambridge (2.105), one in the Crawford collection at the National Library of Scotland (1031), and two in the Roxburghe ballad collection at the British Library (3.845 and 3.270-271).

== Adaptations ==
Although this tale never became as definitive as many other origin stories for the Merry Men, Howard Pyle used it in The Merry Adventures of Robin Hood, modifying it slightly: in that version, the foresters also threaten to arrest Robin for poaching, one of them tries to shoot him, and that forester is the only one Robin kills.

== Location ==
Nottingham was founded as an Anglo-Saxon settlement and was conquered by the Danes in the 9th century. Under the Danelaw (areas of northern and eastern England under control of the Danes), Nottingham was one of the Five Burghs, or fortified towns. In those times, the current location of Nottingham fell within the area of the Kingdom of Mercia and was called (in the Brythonic language) Tigguo Cobauc, or "Place of Caves." Under the rule of a Saxon chieftain named Snot, it was known as "Snotingaham," which means "the homestead of Snot's people." By the time of Robin Hood's historical provenance, in the 13th century in the Middle Ages, the village of Nottingham had a castle, St. Peter's Church had been built there, and a Carmelite friary had been established.
