= Robin Hood and Allan-a-Dale =

English folk song

Robin Hood and Allan-a-Dale is a traditional English ballad, catalogued as Child Ballad No. 138 and as Roud Folk Song Index No. 3298.

== Structure ==
The ballad uses the kinds of rhyme, rhythm and metre commonly found in English ballads of the 13th and 14th centuries. It has from six to ten syllables per line, and no strict metrical scheme, but the rhyme scheme is throughout of ABCB quatrains. It was first published in 1765 in Bishop Thomas Percy's three volume compilation of ballads entitled Reliques of Ancient English Poetry.

== Synopsis ==
Robin Hood one day sees a cheerful young man dressed in red, singing and playing in the greenwood: it is Allan-a-Dale. The next day, he sees him again, dejected. He sends two of his Merry Men, Little John and Much the Miller's Son, to apprehend him. Robin asks Allan for money; but he explains that he has but little, and that the cause of his sorrow is that his true love is to be married to an elderly knight. When Allan agrees to serve Robin, the latter springs into action. He turns up at the church as a harper, but refuses to play: firstly, until he has seen the bride and groom; secondly, after he has seen them, because he does not consider the old man and the young girl a suitable match. He blows his horn: and his Merry Men, now including Allan, appear. The bishop refuses to marry Allan and the girl, because it is the law that consent must be asked three times. Robin puts the bishop's cloak on Little John, who mockingly asks the question seven times – and then marries the young couple, Robin giving away the bride in loco parentis. All then - except, presumably, for the old knight and the bishop - retire to the greenwood.
