= Robin Hood and the Beggar =

Story in Robin Hood cannon preserved in ballad form

"Robin Hood and the Beggar" is a story in the Robin Hood canon which has survived as, among other forms, a late seventeenth-century English broadside ballad, and is a pair out of several ballads about the medieval folk hero that form part of the Child ballad collection, which is one of the most comprehensive collections of traditional English ballads. These two ballads share the same basic plot device in which the English folk hero Robin Hood meets a beggar.

== Ballad I ==
"Robin Hood and the Beggar, I" is Child Ballad 133.

One day, Robin Hood sets off on his horse wearing his green mantle, intent on adventure. On his way to Nottingham, he meets a "jolly" beggar wearing a patched coat and with many bags on his person, which especially attract Robin's attention (5.4). The beggar begs, but Robin refuses to offer him charity because, he explains, he is Robin Hood the outlaw and has no money himself. Robin offers to fight him, and the beggar agrees to the fight and lays into him, hoping to injure him and steal his purse. They fight until the blood trickles down Robin's head. Eventually, Robin calls for a truce in which Robin agrees to give over his mantle and horse, and the beggar his coat and bags. They exchange clothing, and Robin, now in the guise of a beggar "brave and stout" (II.7.5), approvingly examines the bags and their contents: "For now I have a bag for my bread, / [...] / So have I another for Corn, / I have one for Mault, and another for salt, / And one for my little Horn" (II.8.1-5). Robin goes to Nottingham as a beggar, where he hears three yeomen are sentenced to hang for poaching the king's deer. He begs their lives from the sheriff, but the Sheriff refuses to release the men, disregarding Robin's plea because he appears as a beggar. Just as the men are about to be hanged at the gallows, Robin blows his horn, summoning his hundred archers. They rescue the three through violence and return to the green wood, celebrating the yeomen's entrance into Robin Hood's band.

== Ballad II ==
"Robin Hood and the Beggar, II" is Child Ballad number 134.

Robin Hood meets and demands money from a beggar. The beggar refuses, and Robin Hood goes to shoot him, but the beggar strikes a blow that breaks both bow and arrow. They fight, and the beggar wounds him, leaving him unconscious. Three of Robin Hood's men find him and manage to revive him. He sends them after the beggar. They know the country and are able to catch him. The beggar offers them money. They decide to take it and kill him, so that Robin Hood would not know. He opens a bag of meal and throws it in their faces. Though Robin Hood would have preferred revenge, he found his men's fate amusing.

== Historical and cultural significance ==
This ballad is part of a group of ballads about Robin Hood that in turn, like many of the popular ballads collected by Francis James Child, were in their time considered a threat to the Protestant religion. Puritan writers, like Edward Dering writing in 1572, considered such tales "'childish follye'" and "'witless devices.'" Writing of the Robin Hood ballads after A Gest of Robyn Hode, their Victorian collector Francis Child claimed that variations on the "'Robin met with his match'" theme, such as this ballad, are "sometimes wearisome, sometimes sickening," and that "a considerable part of the Robin Hood poetry looks like char-work done for the petty press, and should be judged as such." Child had also called the Roxburghe and Pepys collections (in which some of these ballads are included) "'veritable dung-hills [...], in which only after a great deal of sickening grubbing, one finds a very moderate jewel.'"

However, as folklorist and ethnomusicologist Mary Ellen Brown has pointed out, Child's denigration of the later Robin Hood ballads is evidence of an ideological view he shared with many other scholars of his time who wanted to exclude cheap printed ballads such as these from their pedigree of the oral tradition and early literature. Child and others were reluctant to include such broadsides in their collections because they thought they "regularized the text, rather than reflecting and/or participating in tradition, which fostered multiformity."

On the other hand, the broadsides are significant in themselves as showing, as English jurist and legal scholar John Selden (1584–1654) puts it, "'how the wind sits. As take a straw and throw it up in the air; you shall see by that which way the wind is, which you shall not do by casting up a stone. More solid things do not show the complexion of the times so well as ballads and libels.'" Even though the broadsides are cultural ephemera, unlike weightier tomes, they are important because they are markers of contemporary "current events and popular trends."

It has been speculated that in his time Robin Hood represented a figure of peasant revolt, but the English medieval historian J. C. Holt has argued that the tales developed among the gentry, that he is a yeoman rather than a peasant, and that the tales do not mention peasants' complaints, such as oppressive taxes. Moreover, he does not seem to rebel against societal standards but to uphold them by being munificent, devout, and affable. Other scholars have seen the literature around Robin Hood as reflecting the interests of the common people against feudalism. The latter interpretation supports Selden's view that popular ballads provide a valuable window onto the thoughts and feelings of the common people on topical matters: for the peasantry, Robin Hood may have been a redemptive figure.

== Library/archival holdings ==
The English Broadside Ballad Archive at the University of California, Santa Barbara holds seven seventeenth-century broadside ballad versions of this tale: three in the Pepys collection at Magdalene College at the University of Cambridge (2.113, 2.102, and 2.104), three in the Roxburghe ballad collection at the British Library (3.20-21, 3.418-19, and 3.14-15), and one in the Crawford collection at the National Library of Scotland.

== See also ==
- "Robin Hood Rescuing Three Squires"
