= Robin Hood and Queen Katherine =

Traditional song

"Robin Hood and Queen Katherine" (Roud 72, Child 145) is an English folk song about Robin Hood. The ballad "Robin Hood's Chase" functions as a sequel to it.

== Synopsis ==
Robin befriends Queen Katherine. When King Henry offers a large wager that his archers cannot be excelled, she summons Robin and his men, who come to London under assumed names. Robin's bowmen prevail and reveal their identities. Having promised not to be angry with the queen's archers, the king asks Robin to leave his band of outlaws and join the court (in the main variant), but Robin declines.

== Historical background ==
The Queen Katherine of the title is not certainly identified, nor the spelling of the name certain. Up until as recently as the 18th century, people often spelled their own names differently at different times. So while the periods of time with which Robin Hood has normally been associated did not have any queens named Katherine, because the king is sometimes called Henry, she may be meant to be Catherine de Valois, the young French princess married to King Henry V of England, hero of Agincourt, or Katherine of Aragon, placing the story in the time of Henry VIII.

== Adaptations ==
Howard Pyle included this tale in The Merry Adventures of Robin Hood but, to make the tale historically consistent, made it about Eleanor of Aquitaine making a bet with Henry II. Others have followed his lead in the substitution.

== See also ==
- List of the Child Ballads
