= Robin Hood's Chase =

Traditional song

Robin Hood's Chase (Roud 3989, Child 146) is an English folk song about Robin Hood, and serves as a sequel to "Robin Hood and Queen Katherine". This song has survived as, among other forms, a late seventeenth-century English broadside ballad. It is one of several ballads about the medieval folk hero that form part of the Child Ballads.

== Synopsis ==
The tale opens with a recount of the archery contest in "Robin Hood and Queen Katherine", for which Queen Katherine has wagered "three hundred Tun of good red wine / and three hundred Tun of Beer" (2.4-5). (Note: The parenthetical citations in this synopsis refer to the stanzas and lines of a text transcription of a 17th-century broadside ballad version of this tale held in the Pepys collection at Magdalene College, Cambridge.) She summons Robin Hood to tell him of the match and Robin agrees to it, with the proviso that if he misses the mark, whether it be light or dark, he will be hanged.

Robin wins the match against the Queen's archers, but King Henry (possibly intended as Henry VIII) is angry that he has won and pursues Robin in a very long chase through many towns, including Yorkshire, Newcastle, Berwick, and many others. At first, Robin is protected by the Queen, but he must flee the court before the King returns.

The first village the King visits in pursuit of Robin Hood is Nottingham, where Robin is hiding in Sherwood Forest. But the King hears Robin and knows he is there, and so Little John suggests they flee to Yorkshire; from there, Robin Hood and his men pass through the fore-mentioned towns and others besides. Finally, Robin decides they should go to London; perhaps the King is chasing them because the Queen wishes to see Robin.

When he meets the Queen in London, he tells her he is there to see the King and the Queen tells him of the King's pursuit to Sherwood. Robin tells her he will then go back to Sherwood to speak to Henry. The King returns after Robin has left the court, and when he hears that Robin has been there he says "Dame fortune" has been "unkind" and calls Robin a "cunning knave" (21.5, 23.4). Hearing this, the Queen begs Henry to pardon Robin Hood's life and so the chase comes to an end.

== See also ==
- List of the Child Ballads
