= Robin Hood and the Golden Arrow =

Traditional song

"Robin Hood and the Golden Arrow" (Roud 3994, Child 152) is an English folk song, part of the Robin Hood canon. It features an archery competition for a golden (or silver) arrow that has long appeared in Robin Hood tales, but it is the oldest recorded one where Robin's disguise prevents his detection.

== Synopsis ==
The sheriff of Nottingham complains to King Richard of Robin Hood. The king declares that the sheriff is his sheriff and must catch him. The sheriff decides to trap him with an archery contest, where the prizes would be arrows with golden and silver heads. Robin decides to compete, despite a warning from David of Doncaster that it is a trap, though he does order the Merry Men to attend in great number and disguised. Robin goes in disguise and wins, escaping without being recognized. At Little John's advice, a letter is written to the sheriff and shot into his hall, telling the truth.

== Archery contests in Robin Hood tales ==
There are many archery contests in the legends of Robin Hood, but many of them are clearly derived from this source, as in Howard Pyle's The Merry Adventures of Robin Hood. Other variants are more closely related to the older contest included in A Gest of Robyn Hode, where they are recognized and must fight free.

== Portrayals ==
The story is portrayed in the 1938 film The Adventures of Robin Hood starring Errol Flynn in which Prince John, Guy of Gisbourne, and the Sheriff of Nottingham plan to trap Robin as the most likely winner of the contest, knowing of his attraction to the Lady Marian, and Robin splits the arrow of another contestant to thus win the prize of the golden arrow given by her hand. An altered version of the tale appears in the first episode of the Robin of Sherwood television series, in which the prize offered is a silver arrow belonging to Herne the Hunter as a means of luring Robin to the castle. This episode is parodied in Mel Brooks' Robin Hood: Men in Tights in which the contest itself seduces Robin. The event also appears in the animated Disney film, with the prizes instead being a golden arrow and a kiss from Maid Marian. The event also appears in the computer game Conquests of the Longbow: The Legend of Robin Hood, where the player, as Robin Hood, can win a golden arrow in an archery contest, thereby adding its value (15000 marks) to a ransom to free Richard the Lionheart from prison abroad. The event also appears in the Doctor Who episode "Robot of Sherwood," with Robin splitting another contestant’s arrow, before the Doctor splits Robin’s arrow.

== See also ==
- List of the Child Ballads
