= The Merry Adventures of Robin Hood =

Book by Howard Pyle

The Merry Adventures of Robin Hood of Great Renown in Nottinghamshire
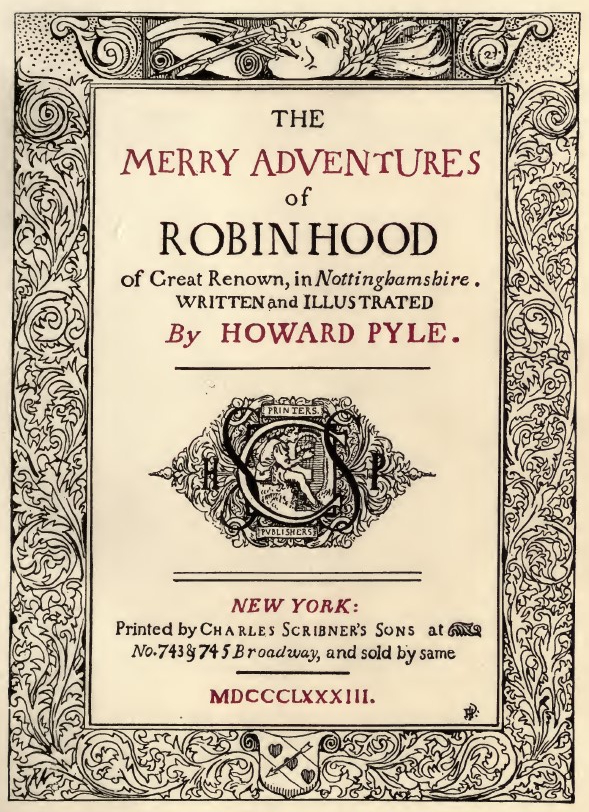
- Decorative title page, 1883 edition
- Author: Howard Pyle
- Language: English
- Genre: Children's literature, historical fiction
- Published: 1883 (Scribner's)
- Publication place: United States
- Pages: 192
- Text: The Merry Adventures of Robin Hood of Great Renown in Nottinghamshire at Wikisource

The Merry Adventures of Robin Hood of Great Renown in Nottinghamshire is an 1883 novel by the American illustrator and writer Howard Pyle. Pyle compiled the traditional Robin Hood ballads as a series of episodes of a coherent narrative. For his characters' dialog, Pyle adapted the late Middle English of the ballads into a dialect suitable for children.

The novel is notable for taking the subject of Robin Hood, which had been increasingly popular through the 19th century, in a new direction that influenced later writers, artists, and filmmakers through the next century.

== Character ==
The plot follows Robin Hood as he becomes an outlaw after a conflict with foresters and through his many adventures and run-ins with the law. Each chapter tells a different tale of Robin as he recruits Merry Men, resists the authorities, and aids his fellow man. The popular stories of Little John defeating Robin in a fight with staffs, of Robin's besting at the hands of Friar Tuck, and of his collusion with Allan a Dale all appear. In the end, Robin and his men are pardoned by King Richard the Lionheart and his band are incorporated into the king's retinue, much to the dismay of the Sheriff of Nottingham.

== Development and significance ==
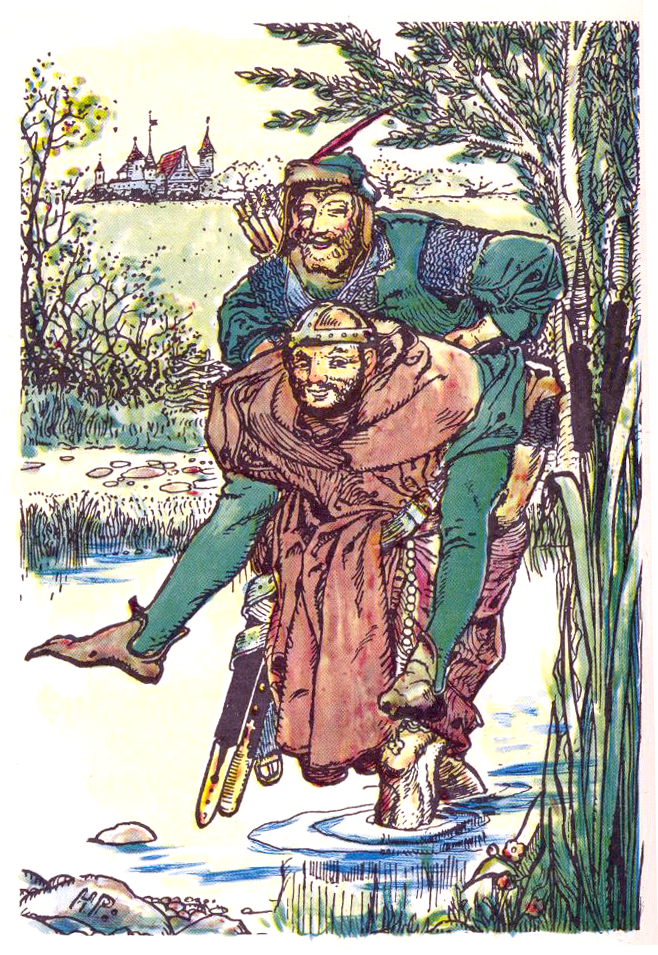
Friar Tuck carries Robin Hood across a river. Frontispiece illustration by Howard Pyle.

Pyle had been submitting illustrated poems and fairy tales to New York publications since 1876, and had met with success. The Merry Adventures of Robin Hood was the first novel he attempted. He took his material from mediaeval ballads and wove them into a cohesive story, altering them for coherence and the tastes of his child audience. For example, he included "Robin Hood and the Curtal Friar" in the narrative order to introduce Friar Tuck as part of retelling the ballad "Robin Hood and Allan-a-Dale", as he needed a cooperative priest for the wedding of outlaw Allan a Dale to his sweetheart Ellen. In the original "A Gest of Robyn Hode", the knight saves the life of an anonymous wrestler who had won a bout but was likely to be murdered because he was a stranger. Pyle adapted it and gave the wrestler the identity of David of Doncaster, one of Robin's band in the story "Robin Hood and the Golden Arrow". In his novelistic treatment of the tales, Pyle thus developed several characters who had been mentioned in only one ballad, such as David of Doncaster or Arthur a Bland.

Pyle's book continued the 19th-century trend of portraying Robin Hood as a heroic outlaw who robs the rich to feed the poor; this portrayal contrasts with the Robin Hood of the ballads, where the protagonist is an out-and-out crook, whose crimes are motivated by personal gain rather than politics or a desire to help others. For instance, he modified the late 17th-century ballad "Robin Hood's Progress to Nottingham", changing it from Robin killing fourteen foresters for not honoring a bet to Robin defending himself against an attempt on his life by one of the foresters. Pyle has Robin kill only one man, who shoots at him first. Tales are changed in which Robin steals all that an ambushed traveler carried, such as the late 18th-century ballad "Robin Hood and the Bishop of Hereford", so that the victim keeps a third and another third is dedicated to the poor.

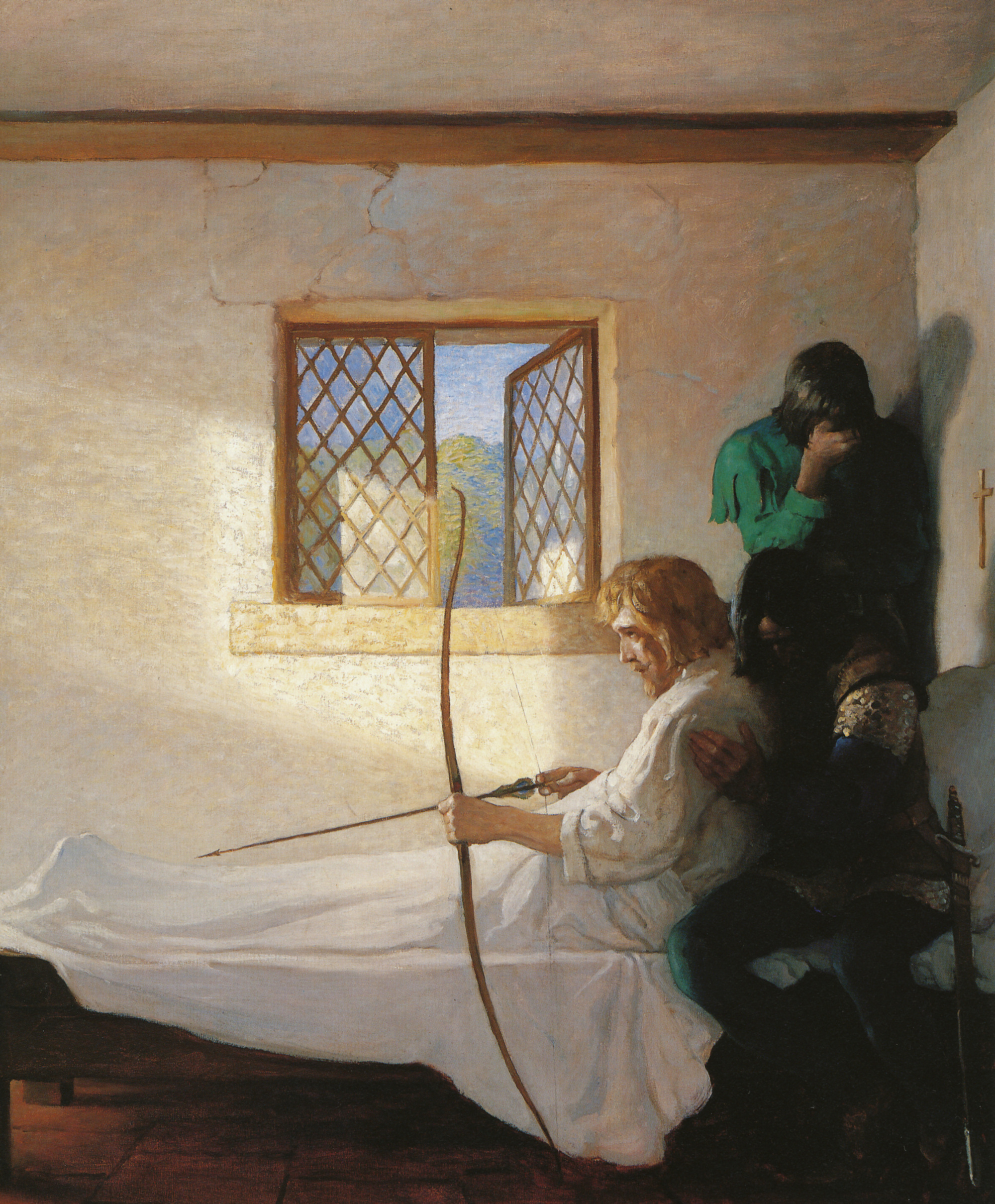
"The Passing of Robin Hood". Painting by N C Wyeth, a student of Pyle. Published in Robin Hood by Paul Creswick (1917)

Pyle did not have much concern for historical accuracy, but he renamed the queen-consort in the story "Robin Hood and Queen Katherine" as Eleanor (of Aquitaine). This made her compatible historically with King Richard the Lion-Heart, with whom Robin eventually makes peace.

The novel was first published by Scribner's in 1883, and met with immediate success, ushering in a new era of Robin Hood stories. It helped solidify the image of a heroic Robin Hood, which had begun in earlier works such as Walter Scott's 1819 novel Ivanhoe. In Pyle's wake, Robin Hood has become a staunch philanthropist protecting innocents against increasingly aggressive villains. Along with the publication of the Child Ballads by Francis James Child, which included most of the surviving Robin Hood ballads, Pyle's novel helped increase the popularity of the Robin Hood legend in the United States. The Merry Adventures also had an effect on subsequent children's literature. It helped move the Robin Hood legend out of the realm of penny dreadfuls and into the realm of respected children's books. After Pyle, Robin Hood became an increasingly popular subject for children's books: Louis Rhead's Bold Robin Hood and His Outlaw Band (1912) and Paul Creswick's Robin Hood (1917), illustrated by Pyle's pupil N. C. Wyeth, were children's novels after Pyle's fashion.

== Invented Middle English dialect ==
Merry Adventures

"Now will I make my vow," quoth Little John, "thou art the very best swordsman that ever mine eyes beheld." ...
"Now," quoth Little John, "it doth seem to me that instead of striving to cut one another's throats, it were better for us to be boon companions. What sayst thou, jolly Cook, wilt thou go with me to Sherwood Forest and join with Robin Hood's band? Thou shalt live a merry life within the woodlands, and sevenscore good companions shalt thou have, one of whom is mine own self. Thou shalt have two suits of Lincoln green each year, and forty marks in pay."

— Part Second, Chapter III, p 73
Gest

"I make my vow to God," said Little John,
"And by my true lewté,
Thou art one of the best swordmen
That ever yet saw I me.

"Couldst thou shoot as well with a bow,
To green wood thou shouldst with me,
And two times in the year thy clothing
Changed should be,

"And every year of Robin Hood
Twenty marks to thy fee."
"Put up thy sword," said the cook,
"And fellows will we be."

— Third Fytte, lines 673-684

Pyle's characters use a manner of speaking that has since become familiar to modern audiences as a sort of Middle English or Early Modern English dialect. Here is part of the dialog during the sword duel scene between Little John and the Cook compared to the dialog in the corresponding scene found in A Gest of Robyn Hode. (The Gest spelling has been updated to Modern English spelling for easier reading.)
