= Robin Hood and the Tanner =

Traditional song

Robin Hood and the Tanner (Roud 332, Child 126) is a late seventeenth-century English broadside ballad and folk song that forms part of the Robin Hood canon.

== Synopsis ==
The story follows the exploits of a tanner, or leather-maker, named Arthur a Bland. One summer morning, the formidable Arthur, oaken pikestaff on shoulder, sets off through Sherwood Forest to see the red deer there. Along the way, he encounters Robin Hood, who accuses him of poaching. Arthur challenges Robin with his pikestaff ("For thy sword & thy bow I care not a straw" [2.6]) and curses at him ("If thou get a knock upon the bare scop, / thou canst as well sh[*]t[*] as shoot" [2.9-10]). Robin cautions him to speak more cleanly, but Arthur refuses, and so Robin intends to discipline him, but wants to fight with a staff of equal length. Arthur rudely challenges him again and Robin knocks him on the head hard enough to make the blood trickle down; when he recovers, Arthur strikes Robin with the same result. The sight of his own blood makes Robin "[rave] like a wild Boar" (3.16). The two men fight so energetically that they are like "two wild Boars in a chase" and "all the wood [rings] at every bang" (3.23, 29). After two hours, Robin calls a stop to the fighting and promises that Arthur is free to roam Sherwood Forest from now on. In return, Arthur promises that he will tan Robin's hide for free. Robin then reveals his identity and makes a further offer: that Arthur give up his trade and come to live with him, for pay, in Sherwood Forest. Arthur accepts and asks after Robin's side-kick, Little John, to whom he is related on his mother's side. Robin blows on his horn and Little John appears. Robin explains his combative stance by telling him that Arthur is certainly a tanner, as he has tanned his hide. At first not understanding that Robin approves of Arthur, Little John offers to have his "hide" "tanned," too: "[I]f such a feat he can do / If he be so stout, we will have a bout, / and he shall tan my hide too" (4.30-32). But Robin stops Little John by explaining Arthur's moral character and his relation to him. Little John then throws his pike aside and clasps Arthur around the neck, weeping for joy. The three men dance together around an oak-tree to celebrate their new identity as a band of three.

In other variants, Arthur is not related to Little John.

== Historical and cultural significance ==
This ballad is part of a group of ballads about Robin Hood that in turn, like many of the popular ballads collected by Francis James Child, were in their time considered a threat to the Protestant religion. Puritan writers, like Edward Dering writing in 1572, considered such tales "'childish follye'" and "'witless devices.'" Writing of the Robin Hood ballads after A Gest of Robyn Hode, their Victorian collector Francis Child claimed that variations on the "'Robin met with his match'" theme, such as this ballad, are "sometimes wearisome, sometimes sickening," and that "a considerable part of the Robin Hood poetry looks like char-work done for the petty press, and should be judged as such." Child had also called the Roxburghe and Pepys collections (in which some of these ballads are included) "'veritable dung-hills [...], in which only after a great deal of sickening grubbing, one finds a very moderate jewel.'" However, as folklorist and ethnomusicologist Mary Ellen Brown has pointed out, Child's denigration of the later Robin Hood ballads is evidence of an ideological view he shared with many other scholars of his time who wanted to exclude cheap printed ballads such as these from their pedigree of the oral tradition and early literature. Child and others were reluctant to include such broadsides in their collections because they thought they "regularized the text, rather than reflecting and/or participating in tradition, which fostered multiformity." On the other hand, the broadsides are significant in themselves as showing, as English jurist and legal scholar John Selden (1584–1654) puts it, "'how the wind sits. As take a straw and throw it up in the air; you shall see by that which way the wind is, which you shall not do by casting up a stone. More solid things do not show the complexion of the times so well as ballads and libels.'" Even though the broadsides are cultural ephemera, unlike weightier tomes, they are important because they are markers of contemporary "current events and popular trends." It has been speculated that in his time Robin Hood represented a figure of peasant revolt, but the English medieval historian J. C. Holt has argued that the tales developed among the gentry, that he is a yeoman rather than a peasant, and that the tales do not mention peasants' complaints, such as oppressive taxes. Moreover, he does not seem to rebel against societal standards but to uphold them by being munificent, devout, and affable. Other scholars have seen the literature around Robin Hood as reflecting the interests of the common people against feudalism. The latter interpretation supports Selden's view that popular ballads provide a valuable window onto the thoughts and feelings of the common people on topical matters: for the peasantry, Robin Hood may have been a redemptive figure.

== Library and archival holdings ==
The English Broadside Ballad Archive at the University of California, Santa Barbara holds three seventeenth-century broadside ballad versions of this tale: one in the Euing collection at the Glasgow University Library (304), another in the Pepys collection at Magdalene College at the University of Cambridge (2.111), and another in the Crawford collection at the National Library of Scotland (665).

== Recordings ==
An audio recording of this ballad is available online.

An instrumental recording of this ballad by Richard Searles is available online.

The ballad has been recorded by A. L. Lloyd (on "Bramble Briars and Beams of the Sun") and Roy Harris (on "The Bitter and the Sweet").
