= List of Sveriges Medeltida Ballader =

This is a list of ballads found in Sveriges Medeltida Ballader.

== Ballads of the supernatural (Naturmytiska visor) ==
Number	Title	TSB	Cognates	Notes	Synopsis
1	Riddar Stigs runor	A 4			
2	Sömnrunorna	A 11	Child 43		A young maiden is widely reputed to have spent the night with many men, yet she remains a virgin. Her reputation travels so far, it comes to the Prince of England. Determined to win her, he calls for his horse and rides to meet her. When he arrives, she invites him into her chamber, but as soon as he sits on her bed, his eyes grow heavy and he lays down to sleep. Three days later the maiden awakes him and sends him on his way, none the wiser. In truth, she had written "raven runes" [ramme runor], the 'Sleep Runes' of the song-title, upon the sheets.
3	Kung Erik och spåkvinnan	A 12			King Erik sends for a fortune teller. After testing her abilities, he is informed that he (and in some variants his queen) does not have long to live.
4	Jungfrun i fågelhamn	A 16			A man tries to catch a deer in the woods. The deer turns into a hawk. He feeds the hawk a piece of his own flesh, and it turns into a maid, who explains that her stepmother had cast a spell on her.
5	Den förtrollade riddaren	A 19			A knight's stepmother transforms him into a werewolf, and tells him he must drink the blood of his brother to break the spell. He kills the stepmother and drinks the blood of her unborn son.
6	Varulven	A 20			A maid is killed by a werewolf while walking the woods.
7	Förvandling och förlösning	A 22			Mother and daughter are approached by a fox and a wolf who accuse them of being their mothers, and of having turned them into animals. They drink the women's blood, and a "fortune teller" appears, transforming them into humans again.
8	Blacken	A 25			A king's enchanted horse, Blacken, swims after the king when he goes abroad. He returns and dies of exhaustion.
9	Ravnen Rune	A 26			Rune the Raven visits Kerstin, who is held prisoner by her husband. Rune flies to Kerstin's father, who come to the rescue on his enchanted horse Blacken. In some variants, Blacken loses his powers when his name is spoken, throws his master off and continues alone (and dies of exhaustion).
10	Jungfrun i hindhamn	A 27			A man out hunting fails to heed his mother's advice not to shoot a deer. When he flays the deer, he finds locks of hair and jewelry, and realizes that the deer was his sister (lover) under a spell.
11	Lindormen	A 29	Child 34		A maid goes to bed with a lindworm, and wakes up next to a king's son.
12	Jungfrun förvandlad till lind	A 30	Child 34		A maid has been transformed into a lime tree (usually by her stepmother). Another maid encounters the tree and sends for help.
13	De två systrarna	A 38	Child 10		One sister drowns the other. The dead sister is made into a harp, and the harp reveals the crime.
14	Den förtrollade barnaföderskan (Liten Kerstins förtrollning)	A 40	Child 6		A woman's pregnancy is prolonged through magic.
15	Redebold och Gullborg	A 41	Child 7 (and Child 8)	The supernatural element in 15–16 lies in the breaking of the name taboo being the cause of Redebold/Hillebrand's death. This "dead-naming" is omitted in the English ballads.	Redebold elopes with his beloved Gullborg. Her father and his men go after them. Redebold prepares to fight them, and asks Gullborg not to mention his name. When he kills her father (or brother), she calls out for him, and he is immediately cut down.
16	Hilla lilla	A 42	Child 7 (and 8)		Hilla relates her misfortunes, including "dead-naming" her beloved Hillebrand, as in the above, and being sold (and/or locked up) by her family.
17	Riddaren i fågelhamn	A 44			A maid will only accept a suitor who can fly. A young man makes wings of gold and flies to her.
18	Unge Svedendal (Hertig Silfverdal)	A 45	Svipdagsmál		Svedendal is cursed to not find peace until he finds the woman meant for him, whom he has never met. He awakes his dead father, who offers help in the form of various enchanted items. Svedendal meets a shepherd who leads him to the maiden, who awaits him, herself under a spell that only he can break.
19	Agneta och havsmannen	A 47	Child 41		Agneta follows a merman to his underwater abode, where she stays and has several children. Hearing church bells, she longs for home, and is permitted to go visit her family. She disregards all conditions her captor has postulated for her release, and he appears, demanding she returns to care for her children, but Agneta says she does not care.
20	Näcken bortför jungfrun	A 48			A neck abducts a maid.
21	Ungersven och havsfrun	A 49			A man is abducted by a sea-troll, or mermaid, who makes him forget his past. In some variants, he saves himself by playing a magical harp.
22	Harpans kraft	A 50			A man asks his beloved why she is unhappy. She replies that she has two (or more) sisters who drowned (or that she was prophesied to drown herself). Precautions are taken, but the girl falls in the river nonetheless. The man plays a magical harp to force the neck to give her (and her sisters) back.
23	Havsfruns tärna	A 51			A man successfully frees his sister from a sea-troll or mermaid, where she has been held prisoner for years. The sea-troll mourns her loss.
24	Den bergtagna	A 54	Child 41		A maid is led astray and imprisoned by a mountain dwarf (bergtagning). They have several children. She returns to see her mother, but is taken back inside the mountain and made to forget her family (or killed).
25	Bergman och Herreman	A 58			A mountain dwarf asks for a maid's hand, then takes her away by force, but she turns around and rides back home.
26	Herr Magnus och havsfrun (Herr Mannelig)	A 59			Sir Magnus is courted by a female troll, but turns her down.
27	Herr Peder och dvärgens dotter	A 61			Sir Peder is out riding, and arrives in a mountain, where he meets a dwarf's daughter. He kills her.
28	Riddar Tynne	A 62			
29	Herr Olof och älvorna	A 63	Child 42		Sir Olof encounters fairies who invite him to dance with them. He declines, and falls ill and dies.
30	Jungfrurnas gäst	A 64			
31	Älvefärd	A 65			
32	Sorgens makt	A 67	Child 77		A mourning girl receives a nightly visit from her dead fiancé.
33	Styvmodern	A 68			A woman returns from the dead when she sees her children suffer at the hands of their stepmother.
34	Gengångaren	A 69			
35	Herr Mårten	A 70			A man encounters Sir Mårten, whom he knows to be dead. Apparently, Mårten had wrongfully claimed a piece of land, and demands that his wife return it. If his wife does not believe the man, Mårten explains, she shall find Mårten's boots filled with blood.
36	Herr Holger	A 71			

== Legendary ballads (Legendvisor) ==
Number	Title	TSB	Cognates	Notes	Synopsis
37	Jungfru Maria och Jesus	B 4			
38	Underbar syn	B 7			
39	Sankte Staffan	B 8	Child 22		
40	Sankt Göran och draken	B 10			
41	Sankt Olovs kappsegling	B 12			
42	Liten Karin	B 14			A king becomes infatuated with Karin (St. Catherine). He offers her gifts, but she refuses them. He has her executed in a "nail barrel" (Swedish: spik[e]tunna). She is taken to heaven, and the king to hell.
43	Maria Magdalena	B 16	Child 21		Mary Magdalene meets Jesus in the wilderness. She claims to be a virgin, but Jesus says this is not true, and that she has had three children, with her father, her brother, and the parish priest. As punishment, she must stay in the wilderness for seven years. She is then allowed to enter heaven.
44	Fru Gunnel och Eluf väktare	B 17			When the king is away, Lady Gunnel releases all prisoners. She blames Eluf the guard, swearing that if she is not speaking the truth, she will give birth to seven dogs. Eluf is executed; miracles occur at his place of death. Gunnel gives birth to dogs, which she kills.
45	Herr David och hans styvsöner	B 18			
46	Herr Peder och hans syster	B 20			Sir Peder tries to seduce his sister. When she refuses his advances, he falsely claims that she has murdered her illegitimate children. She is burned at the stake. Peder refuses to let her drink. Doves take her to heaven, and ravens take Peder to hell.
47	Herr Töres' döttrar	B 21	Child 14		
48	Duvans sång (Duvans sång på liljekvist)	B 22			A bird sings to a maid that she is expected in (or asks her to follow it to) heaven. Soon after, as she is about to marry, she falls ill and dies.
49	Isa lilla mö	B 25			
50	Sjöfarare i hungersnöd	B 26			
51	Herr Peder och pilgrimen	B 28			
52	Eldprovet	B 29			
53	Rik och fattig syster	B 30			
54	Den rike mannens själ	B 32			

== Historical ballads (Historiska visor) ==
Number	Title	TSB	Cognates	Notes	Synopsis
55	Junker Stränger	C 3		Queen Dagmar is brought to Denmark, 1205	
56	Slaget vid Lena	C 5		The Battle of Lena, 1208	
57	Drottning Dagmars död	C 6		The death of Queen Dagmar, 1212	
58	Drottning Bengjerd	C 7		Queen Bengjerd requests taxes, 1214	
59	Vreta klosterrov	C 8		Abduction from Vreta Abbey	
60	Folke Algotssons brudrov	C 15		Folke Algotsson abducts Ingrid Svantepolksdotter, 1288	
61	Sven Grotheson	C 16		Treats the same event as the preceding entry, and is also known as "Folke Algotssons brudrov", but considered a distinct ballad	
62	Faxehus' förstörelse	C 28		The burning of Faxehus (Faxeholm), 1434	
63	Sten Sture d. ä. och dalkarlarna	C 35		The War of Deposition against King Hans, 1501–1502	
64	Dalvisan	C 40		The Battle of Brunnbäck Ferry, 1521	
65	Gustav Vasa och dalkarlarna (Vasavisan)	C 41		The Swedish War of Liberation, 1521(–1523)	

== Ballads of chivalry (Riddarvisor) ==
Number	Title	TSB	Cognates	Notes	Synopsis
66	Dansen i rosende lund	D 7			
67	Esbern Snare	D 16			
68	Den rika bondedottern	D 21			
69	Herr Karl av Norges land	D 32			
70	Herr Karl och klosterjungfrun	D 37	Child 25		Sir Karl pretends to be dead in order to take his beloved out of convent.
71	Herr Lagman bortför herr Tors brud	D 45			
72	Rudegull seglar bort med sin trolovade (Vänner och fränder)	D 46			Rudegull's beloved is married off to another while he's away, but he arrives just in time to elope with the bride.
73	Herr Nils och stolts Inga	D 49			
74	Stolts Inga och junker Willemson	D 53			
75	Pilgrimen och jungfrun	D 60			
76	Herr Samsing	D 61			
77	Kämpen Grimborg	D 61 B			
78	Herr Grönborg	D 62			
79	Herr Esbjörn	D 67			
80	Ung Hillerström	D 69	Child 71		
81	Jungfrun hämtar sin fästman	D 72	Child 53		
82	Herr Hjälmer	D 78			
83	Rosea lilla	D 84			Rosea and her beloved, a duke, are separated by the king, and Rosea is married off to a count. Upon hearing this, the duke returns to her, and they die in each other's arms. Flowers or trees grow from their graves, their leaves intertwining.
84	Herr Niklas och stolts Adelin	D 85			
85	Axel och Valborg	D 87			
86	Broder prövar syster	D 90			A young man courts a maid. She explains that she has lost her family, except for her brother. The man reveals himself as the brother.
87	Syster friar till broder	D 91			
88	Herr Axel och hans syster	D 96			
89	Henrik Valdemarsson	D 99			
90	Herr Esbjörn och Ingalill	D 104			
91	Ros Elin och kejsare David	D 110			
92	Rosilias sorg	D 115			
93	Den falska tärnan	D 118			
94	Det ärbara frieriet	D 125			
95	Stolts Inga och herr Joel	D 131			
96	Förtvivlan	D 133			
97	Riddar Stigs bröllop	D 139			
98	Giljarekonst	D 140			
99	De goda råden	D 144			
100	Den försmådde friaren	D 148			
101	Jungfru Gunnela och riddar Perleman	D 153			
102	Konungen och hertig Henriks syster	D 154			
103	Palle Bossons död	D 163			
104	Herr Oler	D 167			
105	Lussi lilla	D 168			
106	Brud i vånda	D 182			
107	Väna Sigrid	D 184			
108	Jöde Gunnarsson och stolts Hilla	D 185			
109	Herr Esbjörn och stolts Elin	D 195			
110	Torkel Tronesson	D 201			
111	Ungersvens klagan	D 214			A young man holds off going to his betrothed due to bad weather. When he arrives the next day, he finds her with another.
112	Älskogsklagan	D 216			
113	Herr Peder och fru Margareta	D 220			
114	Trohetsprövningen	D 224			A man pretends to be dead to see how his betrothed will react. He is upset to find her dancing and having fun. She says that she knew he was not dead.
115	Samtalet	D 226			
116	Herr Ivar Jonsson och danska drottningen	D 228			Sir Ivar dances with the Danish queen. The king threatens to execute him, and he flees on a ship.
117	Liten Kerstin och drottningen	D 232			
118	Folke Lagmansson och drottning Hillevi (Falkvard Lagermanson)	D 233			
119	Falcken avrättas	D 235			
120	Frillans hämnd	D 239	Child 68		
121	Herr Wronge	D 243			
122	Herr Peder och liten Kerstin	D 245	Child 73		
123	Fru Märta och herr Tideman	D 247			
149	Blekman (Blekman och Alf)	D 249, D 308			
124	Herr Tavel och stolts Adelin	D 250			
125	Ebbe Skammelsson	D 251			While Ebbe is away, his brother tells his betrothed he's dead, in order to marry her himself. Ebbe returns home for the wedding and kills them both (and kills or mutilates his parents).
126	Herr Ingevald dödar sin brud	D 254			
127	Apelbrand och lilla Lena	D 255			
128	Salmon	D 256			Salmon invites his lovers to his wedding. They give him food and drink, which causes him to go on a rampage, killing the guests, ending with the bride.
129	Kung Valdemar och Tova (Tova lilla)	D 258			
130	Herr Peder, liten Kerstin och konungen	D 260			
131	Fru Gundela	D 274			
132	Dödsbudet	D 279	Child 75		
133	Kärestans död	D 280			
134	Peder Pallebosson	D 282			
135	Hustrun dör	D 283			
136	Fästmannen dör	D 284			
137	Farsot i landet	D 286			
138	Lisa och Nedervall	D 288	Child 15		
139	Sonens sorg	D 289	Child 15		
140	Herr Peder och fru Malfred	D 291			
141	Herr Olof bränns inne	D 292			
142	Samsing drunknar	D 293			
143	Stolts Margreta drunknar	D 294			
144	Ungersvens svek	D 295			
145	Linden och den falska tärnan	D 297			
146	Herr Nils och herr Tideman	D 299			
147	Olof Strångeson	D 300			
148	Herr Dalebo Jonsson	D 304			
149	Blekman	D 249, D 308			
150	Ebbe Tykeson (Ebbe Tykesons dödsritt)	D 309			Ebbe is killed by a group of men, and his horse carries his body (or his clothes) home. His mother does not let his fiancée know that the corpse is his, and when she finds out she dies from sorrow.
151	Ribbolt och Göta lilla	D 311			
152	Herr Aland och liten Cedeborg	D 312			
153	Sven i rosengård	D 320	Child 13		Sven's mother asks him about his bloody clothes, and by degrees he confesses to having murdered his brother.
154	Den lillas testamente	D 321	Child 12		A girl who has been poisoned by her stepmother divides her belongings among her family, but wishes the agonies of hell on her killers.
155	Tove Slätt	D 323			
156	Tore och hans syster	D 324	Child 69		Tore interrogates his sister (or daughter) about her lover, but she explains away his accusations. He then shows her her lover's cut-off hand, and she realizes Tore has killed him.
157	Hustrudråpet	D 329			
158	Palne dräpes	D 334			
159	Rikelund och Vendeli	D 342			
160	Kung Valdemar och hans syster	D 346	Child 64		
161	Ingemar och Hofrid	D 352	Child 89		
162	Riddare på barnsängsgille	D 358			
163	Riddar Malkolm fängslas för häststöld	D 359			
164	Herr Peders sjöresa	D 361	Child 57		Sir Peder is told that he will die at sea. When his ship begins to keel over, he and his crew play dice to determine who among them is the greatest sinner. Peder loses, and confesses to numerous sins. He is thrown overboard, and the ship recovers.
165	Riddar Stigs fall	D 365			
166	Herren Båld	D 367			
167	Kung Valdemar och hans söner	D 372			
168	Olyckligt levnadslopp	D 374			
169	Klosterjungfrun	D 376			
170	Paris och Helena I	D 380			
171	Paris och Helena II	D 381			
172	Hertig Fröjdenborg och fröken Adelin	D 390	Child 269		Count Fröjdenborg courts Lady Adelin. Her father has Fröjdenborg locked up, and later killed. His heart is served to Adelin, and when she finds out, she kills herself. They are buried together.
173	Den bortsålda	D 391	Child 95		A poor man sells his daughter, who tries to coax her relatives into buying her back. They all refuse, but her beloved gladly buys her freedom.
174	David och Solfager	D 392	Child 266		
175	Hertig Henrik	D 393			
176	Knut Huling	D 394			
177	Per svinaherde	D 395			
178	Kerstin stalldräng	D 396	Child 63		
179	Möns morgondrömmar	D 397			
180	Kung David och stolts Malfred	D 398			
181	Liten båtsman	D 399	Child 110		
182	Liten vallpiga	D 405			A king is charmed by a shepherdess's singing. He sends for her to come and sing for him, and ends up taking her as his queen.
183	Allebrand harpolekaren (Allebrand harpspelaren)	D 409			
184	De sju guldbergen	D 410	(The first half of) Child 9		
185	Rövaren Rymer (Den falske riddaren)	D 411	Child 4		A "false knight" abducts a girl, planning to kill her, as he has several others, but she ties him up and kills him instead.
186	Guldsmedsdottern som dräpte kungen	D 413			
187	Dankungen och guldsmedens dotter	D 415			
188	Herr Lage och jungfru Elinsborg	D 419			
189	Riddar Olle	D 421	Child 5		
190	Florens Benediktsson och fru Margareta	D 424			
191	Skepparen och jungfrun	D 426			A maid follows a skipper aboard his ship, falls asleep and wakes up in a distant country. Endings vary: the girl may drown or escape, or the skipper reveals himself as her beloved in disguise.
192	Dankungen och Långlöte möja	D 427			
193	Habor och Signild	D 430			
194	Karl Vågeman	D 434			
195	De bortstulna konungadöttrarna	D 435			Two royal daughters are taken away at a young age. They come to a castle where they serve as maids. When the queen wants one of them to marry her son, they reveal that they are her long lost daughters.
196	Fredrik II i Ditmarsken	D 436			

== Heroic ballads (Kämpavisor) ==
Number	Title	TSB	Cognates	Notes	Synopsis
197	Vidrik Verlandsons kamp med Torkel Troneson	E 5			
198	De tolv starka kämpar	E 10	Vilkina saga chapters 178–182; Der Rosengarten zu Worms		
199	Den stridbare munken	E 19			
200	David och Goliat	E 23			
201	Fästmö befriar fästman	E 31			A girl frees her beloved from prison.
202	Syster befriar broder	E 32			A girl frees her imprisoned brother (in some variants after killing several men).
203	Ulf från Jern	E 37			
204	Sivert Snarensven	E 49			
205	Sven Svanevit	E 52			Sven Svanevit encounters a wandering shepherd, who claims to have killed Sven's father; Sven kills him with his thumb. He engages a second shepherd with a series of riddles; the shepherd answers them correctly, and Sven rewards him with a golden ring.
206	Stolt herr Alf	E 58			
207	Den stridbara jungfrun	E 64			
208	Kung Speleman	E 90			
209	Helleman unge	E 96	Child 89		
210	Sven Fötling och trollet	E 115			
211	Vidrik Verlandsons kamp mot resen	E 119	Vilkina saga chapters 170–177		
212	Tors hammarhämtning	E 126	Þrymskviða		
213	Esbjörn Prude och Ormen stark	E 128	Orm Stórólfssons saga		
214	Ulven starke	E 129			
215	Orm ungersven	E 132			
216	Holger Dansk och Burman	E 133			Burman, a giant or ogre, claims the king's daughter Gloria. She releases the imprisoned Ogier the Dane who defeats Burman.
217	Ramunder	E 139			Ramunder (or Ramund) gets new clothes and sets off to kill several giants.
218	Hemming och bergtrollet	E 144			
219	Havsmannen	E 148			

== Jocular ballads (Skämtvisor) ==
Number	Title	TSB	Cognates	Notes	Synopsis
220	Den giftaslystna	F 1			
221	Friarna	F 5			
222	De omöjliga uppgifterna	F 6			
223	Möns och svennens samtal	F 7			
224	Finn Komfusenfej	F 8			
225	Den motsträvige brudgummen	F 10			
226	Herr Lage och herr Jon	F 11			
227	Skära strå	F 12			
228	Valiknut	F 16			
229	Mjölnarens dotter	F 17			A man hides in a sack in order to get near the miller's daughter.
230	Kom till mig på lördag kväll	F 18			
231	Bonde borrade hjul	F 19			
232	Flickor planterade kål	F 20			
233	Bonddrängen och jungfrun	F 22			
234	Germund smed och prästens dotter	F 24			
235	Klampen	F 25			A maid refuses to let a man in, since she does not hear the sound of her beloved's wooden leg. The man kills him and steals the wooden leg.
236	Tiggargubbens brud	F 26			
237	Den förförde ungersvennen	F 29			
238	Käringen på havsbotten (Den ondsinta käringen)	F 30			
239	Änka och mö	F 31			
240	Malins prov	F 32			
241	Håkan Hök	F 33			
242	Käringen på bröllop	F 36			
243	Bonden och hans hustru (Det kommer en ryttare ridande)	F 40			A farmer sees a knight approaching. The farmer's wife tells the farmer to give the knight the best of food and drink, and let him sleep next to her in bed, and that the farmer may sleep in the pigsty.
244	Per spelman	F 45			Per trades his only cow for a fiddle, which he loses, and gets scolded by his wife.
245	Det underbara bältet	F 46			A man has a belt that is so magnificent that everyone who sees it forgets what they are doing. He declines generous offers from priests and kings who wish to buy the belt, only to end up trading it for a pair of old gloves.
246	Truls med bågen	F 53			
247	Lars och Mas	F 54			
261	Den väldige mannen	F 55			
248	Bonden och kråkan (Bonden i timmerskog)	F 58	Kråkevisa	Sometimes regarded as a satire on the tithe and other taxations.	A farmer shoots a huge crow. Its body is used for an impressive amount of things: food, shoes, and a ship.
249	Kolorumgris	F 60			
250	Rävens testamente	F 63			
251	Bonden och räven (Bonden gick åt grönan äng)	F 64			A farmer bargains with a fox for his hide.
252	Kattens död	F 66			
253	Tordyvelns bröllop	F 67			A beetle employs a horse-fly to propose to a fly on his behalf. The fly replies that she is rich (eats from silver plates) and the beetle poor (lives in the dirt, among the livestock). The horse-fly hits the fly, and she agrees to marry the beetle.
254	Bröllopet i Kråkelund	F 68			
255	Bonden och oxen	F 69			
256	Sven den unge	F 70	Child 3 (Note: Child does not name the Swedish ballad, but one of its source texts, or one or more of its Scandinavian counterparts.)		
257	Bröllopskosten	F 71			
258	Leja tjänstepiga	F 72			
259	Käringen och hovmannnen	F 73			
260	Tjuvarna	F 75			
262	Daniel ungersven	–			
263	Bakvända världen	–			

== See also ==
- Danmarks gamle Folkeviser

== Sources ==
- Jonsson, Bengt R.; Solheim, Svale; Danielson, Eva, eds. (1978). The types of the Scandinavian medieval ballad (2nd ed.). Oslo: Universitetsforlaget. ISBN 82-00-09479-0.
