= Danmarks gamle Folkeviser =

Danish folk song collection

Danmarks gamle Folkeviser (Denmark's Old Folk Songs) is a collection of (in principle) all known texts and recordings of the old Danish popular ballads. It drew both on early modern manuscripts, such as Karen Brahes Folio, and much more recent folk-song collecting activity.

It was started in 1853 by Svend Grundtvig. During the nineteenth century, Axel Olrik was also heavily involved, editing volumes 6-8. The work was continued in the twentieth century by new generations of folklorists, and in 1976 comprised 12 volumes, containing 539 ballad types, often with many variants of each type.

Grundtvig's division of the ballad types into categories has mostly been adopted in later ballad collections, e.g. by F. J. Child, and by modern researchers in the field. However, many of the ballads he classed as 'historic' now have been reclassified. Grundtvig's classifications were:

- Kæmpeviser (heroic songs) (vol. 1)
- Trylleviser (magical songs) (vol. 2)
- Historiske viser (historical songs) (vol. 3)
- Ridderviser (romances) (vols 4-5)
- Danske ridderviser (Danish romances) (vols 6-9)

It is now standard practice to refer to the Danish ballad type by its assigned a DgF number. Variants (or variant groups) are indicated by an alphabet following the DgF number. Thus "Tord af Havsgaard" (DgF 1A) for the version taken down from manuscripts, and DgF 1B for the version printed in Vedel's book. Also it is commonplace to refer to ballad titles by Grundtvig's normalized orthography rather than actual spellings occurring in the texts.

Many of the ballads are Danish examples from a family of cognate ballads disseminated throughout Scandinavia. The TSB or The Types of the Scandinavian Medieval Ballad sigla are used to catalog the pan-Scandinavian cognate type to which a ballad may belong. Some of the ballads have cognates in English, and have been cross-referenced against Child Ballad by Larry Syndergaard, English Translations of the Scandinavian Medieval Ballads (1995) (SMB).

English translations of a number of Danish ballads can be found in R. C. Alexander Prior, Ancient Danish Ballads in 3 vols. (1860); George Borrow, Works; E. M. Smith-Dampier's various publications.

== The ballads ==
Danmarks gamle folkeviser
No.	Title	TSB	Analogue	Translations	Synopsis
1	Tord af Havsgaard (A-C (Note: 1C, vol. IV))	E 126		"Tord of Hafsborough" (Borrow); "Thor of Asgard" (Prior)	Tord loses hammer, sends Lokke Leyemand on quest; The Tosse- or "Fool" Count (or Thusser "Turkish" king) demands damsel Fridleifsborg in exchange, but her father Tord dressed in maiden's garb goes instead. A rendition of Þrymskviða.
2	Sivard Snarensvend (A-D (Note: 2D, vol. IV))	E 49		"The End of Sivard Snarenswayne" (Borrow); "Siward the Hasty Swain" (Prior)	Sivard slays stepfather, and rides off on fine horse named Graamand "Grayman" that his mother provides; he approaches maternal uncle, the Danish king, but in an awesome leap gone awry, both horse and rider perish.
3	Sivard og Brynild (A-E)	E 101	"Siward and Brynhild" (Prior, Cox)		
4	Frændehævn (A-C)	E 54		"Sir Loumor"; "Proud Signild"; "Kingship's Vengeance" (Smith-Dampier)	
5	Grimilds Hævn (A-C)	E 56	"Grimild's Revenge"		
6	Samson (A-C)	D 61		"Samson"	
7	Kong Diderik og hans Kæmper (A-I (Note: 7I, vol. IV))	E 119, E 10		"Vidrick Verlandson and Giant Langbane"	
8	Kong Diderik i Birtingsland	E 7		"King Diderick in Birtingsland"	
9	Kong Diderik og Løven (A-G)	E 158		"King Diderick and the Dragon"	
10	Ulv van Jærn (A-G)	E 37		"Wolf of Yern"	
11	Orm Ungersvend og Bermer-Rise (A-F (Note: 11F, vol. IV))	E 132		"Child Orm and the Berm Giant"	
12	Raadengaard og Ørnen (A-C)	A 32		"Rodengard and the Eagle"	
13	Ravengaard og Memering (A-L (Note: 13GH, vol. II; 13I, vol. III; KL, vol. IV))	D 231	Sir Aldingar (Child 59. II, 34-)	"Ravngard and Memering"	
14	Memering	E 61		"Memering"	
15	Den skallede Munk	E 19		"The Bald-head Monk"	
16	Greve Genselin (A-C)	E 12		"Sir Genselin	
17	Kong Diderik og Holger Danske (A-B)	E 17		"Stout Diderick and Olger the Dane"	
18	Svend Vonved (A-D)	E 52	Sven Svanevit (SMB 205)	"Childe Norman's Riddle Rimes": "Svend Normand" (Meyer)	
19	Angelfyr og Helmer Kamp (A-D)	E 90		"Angelfyr ad Helmer Kamp" (Meyer)	
20	Hagbard og Signe (A-L)	D 430		"Habor and Signild"	
21	Longobarderne (A-D)	D 388		"The Lombards"	
22	Regnfred og Kragelil (A-B)	D 401		"Regnar and Kragelille"	
23	Karl og Kragelil (A-C)	D 403		"Karl and Kragelille"	
24	Ormekampen	E 156		"The Fight with the Worm"	
25	Hævnersværdet	E 48		"The Sword of vengeance"	
26	Liden Grimmer og Hjelmer Kamp (A-C)	E 68		"Grimmer and Helmer Kamp"	
27	Rigen Rambolt og Aller hin stærke (A-B)	E 138		"Ribolt's Fight with the Dragon and Aller" (Borrow)	
28	Ungen Ranild	E 139	Ramunder (SMB 217)	"Childe Ranild"	
29	Gralver Kongesøn (A-I)	E 155			
30	Holger Danske og Burmand (A-D)	E 133	Holger Dansk och Burman (SMB 216)	"Olger the Dane [and Burmand]"	
31	Svend Felding (A-C)	E 115		"Swain Felding"	
32	Svend Felding og Dronning Jutte (A-C)	D 301		"Swain Felding and Queen Judith"	
33	Germand Gladensvend (A-F)	A 74		"German Gladenswain"; "Germand Gladenswayne"	
34	Herr Tønne af Alsø (A-C)	A 62		"Sir Tonné"; "Ermeline"	
35	Peder Gudmandsøn og Dværgene (A-B)	A 61		"Peter Gudmanson and the Dwarfs"	
36	Jomfruen i Bjærget (A-G)	A 53			"The Maid in the Mountain" (discussed by Iørn Piø)
37	Jomfruen og Dværgekongen (A-T (Note: 37HI, vol. III; KLNNOPQRST, vol. IV))	A 54	Hind Etin (Child 41. I, 361-4)	"The Lady and the Dwarf King"	Princess has many suitors but accepts none because a dwarf has forced her to come nightly to his hill by inscribing magic runes en route to her evening prayer. When she divulges truth, seven children she had by dwarf reproach her and she dies.
38	Agnete og Havmanden (A-K (Note: 38EF, vol. II; DGH, vol. III; IK, vol. IV))	A 47	Agneta och havsmannen; Der Wassermann	"Agnes and the Merman" (A); "Agnes and the Hill King" (C)	
39	Nøkkens Svig (A-C)	A 48	The Daemon Lover; La fiancée	"Water Sprite's Treachery" (A), "Mar Stigs Daughter and the Merman" (C)	
40	Harpens Kraft (A-F)	A 50	Harpans kraft (SMB 22)	"Power of the Harp"	
41	Rosmer (A-C)	E 148	Child Rowland to the Dark Tower Came	"Rosmer"; "Rosmer Mereman"; "Der Meermann"	
42	Havfruens Spaadom (A-B)	A 12		"The Queen and the Mermaid"; "Mermaid's Prophecy"; "Mermaid's Spaeing"	
43	Herr Luno og Havfruen	A 52		"Sir Luno and the Mermaid"	
44	Herr Hylleland henter sin Jomfru (A-E (Note: 44E, vol. IV))	E 140		"How Sir Hylleland Wins his Bride"	
45	Herr Bøsmer i elvehjem (A-F (Note: 45BCDEF, vol. IV))	A 49	Ungersven och havsfrun	"Sir Bosmer in Elfland"	
46	Elvehøj (A-C (Note: 46C, vol. IV))	A 65		"Elfin Hill"; "Elvir Hill"	
47	Elveskud (A-Æ (Note: 47HI, vol. II; KLMNOPQRSTUVXYZÆ, vol. IV))	A 63	Clerk Corvill (Child 42. I, 374-8)	"Sir Olave"; "Sir Oluf and the Elf-King's Daughter"; Erlkönigs Tochter (Herder)	
48	Herr Magnus og Bjærgtrolden (A-C (Note: 48C, vol. III))	A 59		"Sir Magnus and the Elf-Maid"	
49	Malfred og Magnus (A-B)	D 439		"Malfred and Mogens"	
50	Hellig-Olavs Væddefart (A-E (Note: DgF X p. 55 (DgF 50 E)))	B 12	Sankt Olovs kappsegling (SMB 41); St. Olavs kappsigling (NMB 44)	"Saint Olave's Voyage"; "St. Olav's Race" (Meyer)	
51	Hellig-Olav og Troldene	E 116		"Saint Olave at Hornelen"	
52	Trolden og Bondens Hustru (A-D)	A 14		"Elf and the Farmer's Wife" (Note: DgF 52D is Prior's "A"; 52A is his "B""; 52B is his "C".)	
53	Ungersvendens Klage (A-B)	D 215			TSB type D 214 "Ungersvendens klagesang—Young man arrives too late and loses his true love"
54	Varulven (A-E (Note: 54D, vol. III; E, vol. IV))	A 20			"The Werewolf", which snatches the foetus from a pregnant woman
55	Jomfruen i Ulveham (A-C (Note: 5BC, vol. IV))	A 19		"Maiden Transformed to a Wer-wolf"	
56	Jomfruen i Fugleham (A-F)	A 16		"Maid as a Hind and Hawk"; Enchanted Maiden/Maiden in Bird's Plumage (Smith-Dampier)	
57	Nattergalen	—		"The Nightingale [, or the Transformed Damsel]"	
58	Jomfruen i Hindeham	A 27		"Maiden Hind"; "Girl in Hind's Skin"	
59	Jomfruen i Ormeham	A 28		"Serpent Bride" (Smith-Dampier)	Child ESPB '1:307
60	Valravnen (A-F)	A 17		"The Raven" (Prior); "Wood-Raven"	
61	Ravn fører Runer	A 35		"Raven Rune-bearer"	
62	Blak og Ravn hin brune	A 26		"Unfortunate Marriage"	
63	Bedeblak	A 25		"Bedeblack"	
64	Dalby-Bjørn (A-B)	A 23		"Dalby Bear"	
65	Lindormen (A-C (Note: 65C, vol. III))	A 29	Lindormen (SMB 11)	"Lindworm" (Prior); "Serpent Knight"	
66	Jomfruen i Linden (A-C)	A 30	Jungfrun förvandlad till lind (SMB 12)	"Maid in the Linden Tree"	
67	Ridderen i Hjorteham (A-E)	A 43		"Knight Disguised as a Hart"	
68	Ridderen i Fugleham (A-G)	A 44, D 136	The Earl of Mar's Daughter (Child 270. V, 39)	"Knight in Bird-Dress"	
69	Kæmperne paa Dovrefjæld	A 46		"Heroes of Doverfjeld"; "Twelve Wizards"	
70	Ungen Svejdal (A-G (Note: 70FG, vol. III))	A 45		"Young Swennendal"; "Young Swaigder"; "Young Svejdal"	
71	Brudefærden til Hedenland (A-E)	E 71			Herr Nelus mounts on a bride-seeking voyage in a foreign land
72	Unge Herr Tor og Jomfru Tore (A-E)	D 47		"Sir Thor and Lady Silvermor"	
73	Ridderens Runeslag (A-B)	A 10		"Fair Mettellille"; "Damsel Mette"; "Sir Oluf and His Gilded Horn"	
74	Tidemand og Blidelille (A-B)	A 8		"Sir Tideman and Blidelill [sic] "	
75	Det tvungne Samtykke (A-D)	A 9		"Compulsory Marriage"; "Forced Consent"	
76	Ridder Stigs Bryllup (A-L)	A 4, D 139		"Knight Stig's Wedding"	
77	Venderland-Grevens Søn (A-B)	A 1			TSB "A1 Venderland-Grevens Søn— Maiden's love gained by runic spell" Count of Venderland's son proposes to Isolt but he is rebuffed by the girl's mother.
78	Herr Peder og Mettelille (A-C)	A 2		"Sir Peter and Mettelille"	
79	Kongesønnens Runer (A-C)	A 3		"Retorted Rune"	
80	Ungersvends Runer (A-B)	A 6			TSB "A6 Ungersvends Runer— Runes placed in maiden's bed lead to her seduction"
81	Søvnerunerne (A-B)	A 11	The Broomfield Hill (Child 43. I, 391)		
82	Ribold og Guldborg (A-B*) (Note: 82UVXY, vol. II; ZÆØA*B*, vol. III)	A 41	Earl Brand (Child 7. I, 88-93, 94m, 99)		
83	Hildebrand og Hilde (A-H) (Note: 83H, vol. II; 83I, vol. III)	A 42, D 375			
84	Hustru og Mands Moder (A-I)	A 40	Willie's Lady (Child 6. I, 82)		
85	Hustru og Slegfred	A 40	Willie's Lady (Child 6. I, 82)		
86	Flores og Margrete (A-L)	D 424			
87	Karl og Margrete (A-C)	D 425			
88	Kong Apollon af Tyre (A-C)	D 382			
89	Moderen under Mulde (A-P (Note: 89P, vol. II; QRSTU, vol. III))	A 68	Styvmodern (SMB 33)		
90	Fæstemanden i Graven (A-C (Note: 90C, vol. III))	A 67	Sweet William's Ghost (Child 77. II, 227); Sorgens makt (SMB 32)		Mourning girl's dead fiancé visits, piggybacking his coffin, tries to convince her to stop her weeping which causes coffin to bleed. She still prays for death and illness carries her away a month after.
91	Hedebys Gjenganger	A 69			
92	Herr Morten af Fuglsang	A 70			
93	Dødningens Bistand	B 15			
94	Livsvandet (A-B)	B 27	Lady Diamond (Child 269. V, 34)		
95	Den talende Strængeleg (A-K (Note: 95HIK, vol. III))	A 38	The Twa Sisters (Child 10. I, 119)		
96	Jesusbarnet, Stefan og Herodes (A-C) (Note: 96BC, vol. III)	B 8	St. Stephen and Herod (Child 22. I, 233-); Rudisar vísa (CCF 167)		
97	Jesus og Jomfru Maria (A-D (Note: 97D, vol. III))	B 4		"Jesus and the Virgin Mary"	
98	Maria Magdalena (A-B)	B 16	The Maid and the Palmer (Child 21. I, 228-230); Maria Magdalena (SMB 42)	"Mary Magdalene"	
99	Den blinde Mand ved Jesu Kors	B 6			
100	Den hellige Jakob. Himmerig og Helvede (A-D (Note: 100D, vol. III))	B 7		"Saint James and the Vision of Hell"	
101	Liden Karen -St Katharina (A-H (Note: 101H, vol. III))	B 14	Liten Karin (SMB 42)		
102	Jomfru Thorelille	B 22			
103	St. Jørgen og Dragen (A-D (Note: 103D, vol. III))	B 10		"Saint George and the Dragon"	
104	Engelens Budskab (A-F (Note: 104DEF, vol. III))	B 22		"The Angel's Errand"	
105	Den rige Mands Sjæl	B 32	Den rike mannens själ (SMB 54)	"The Rich man's soul"	
106	Sjælen for Himmerigs Dør	B 33			
107	Barnesjælen (A-C)	B 24			
108	Ildprøven (A -F)	B 29		"Ordeal by Fire"	
109	Møen paa Baalet (A-D (Note: 109D, vol. III))	B 20			
110	Den myrdede Hustru	D 328			
111	Helbredelsen (A-C (Note: 111C, vol. III))	B 28			
112	Helligbrøden (A-G)	D 299			
113	Sakarias	B 9			
114	Henrik af Brunsvig (A-B)	D 393			
115	Dansk kongetal (A-B)	F 74			
116	Erik Emuns Drab 1137	C 1			
117	Ridder Stigs Fald 1151	D 365			
118	Kongemødet i Roskilde 1157	C 2			
119	Riber-Ulvs Bedrift	D 364			
120	Riber-Ulvs Endeligt 1157	D 362			
121	Valdemar og Tove c. 1160 (A-D)	D 258			
122	Tovelilles Giftermaal	D 261			
123	Find Lille	D 139			
124	Rosengaard og Hillelille	D 46	Rudegull seglar bort med sin trolovade (SMB 72)		
125	Hin rige Valravn (A-B)	D 105			
126	Kong Valdemar og hans Søster 1157-1167 (A-I (Note: 126HI, vol. III))	D 346	Fair Janet (Child 64. II 143, IV, 464a); Kung Valdemar och hans syster (SMB 160);		
127	Kong Valdemar og hans Søsterdatter c. 1172 (A-C)	D 347			
128	Liden Kirstin og Dronning Sofie	D 232			
129	Stolt Signild og Dronning Sofie	D 257			
130	Mettelille og Dronning Sofie (A-E)	D 326			
131	Esbern Snare (A-E)	D 16			
132	Dronning Dagmar og Junker Strange 1205 (A-D)	C 3			Cf. Dagmar of Bohemia
133	Dronning Dagmar i Danmark 1205 (A-B)	C 4			Cf. Dagmar of Bohemia
134	Herr Strange og Dagmars Jomfru 1205	D 277			
135	Dronning Dagmars Død 1212 (A-C)	C 6			Cf. Dagmar of Bohemia
136	Kong Sverker den unge 1208 (A-C)	C 5			
137	Den danske Kongedatter i Sverig 1210 (A-B)	D 137			
138	Sune Folkesøn c. 1210 (A-L)	C 8	Vreta klosterrov (SMB 59)		Sune Folkesson abducted his Swedish princess bride Elin, from a convent at Vreta. She has a presaging dream about this.
139	Dronning Bengerd c. 1214-1221 (A-B)	C 7			
140	Nilaus Markgrevens Søn c. 1214 (A-G)	D 43			
141	Kong Valdemar fangen 1225 (A-E)	C 9			cf. Valdemar Sejr
142	Kong Hakon Hakonsøns død 1263 (A-B)	C 11			
143	Tule Vognsøn og Svend Graa 1275 (A-B)	D 353			
144	Herr Jon og Fru Bodil (A-G)	D 366			
145	Marsk Stig 1286 (A-O)	C 14			
146	Marsk Stigs Døttre (A-O (Note: 146NO, vol. III))	D 435			
147	Indtagelsen af Riberhus (A-D)	D 363			
148	Rane Jonsens giftermaal 1286 (A-C)	C 19			
149	Ranild Jonsens endeligt 1294 (A-B)	C 20			
150	Mindre-Alfs vikinstog 1285	C 12			
151	Mindre-Alfs endeligt 1290 (A-B)	C 17			
152	Røverne for norden Skov (A-F)	D 176			
153	Erik Menveds Bryllup 1296	C 21			
154	Kong Birger og hans brødre (A-)	C 24			
155	Kong Birgers søster Bengta (Herr Lavrens og Bengta Sunes Datter) 1245 (A-B)	C 10			
156	Niels Ebbesen 1340 (A-F)	C 25			Cf. Niels Ebbesen
157	Kongens Søn af Engeland c. 1350	D 270			
158	Herr Bugges død 1359 (A-E)	C 26			
159	Dronning Margrete 1389 (A-F)	C 27			Margaret I of Denmark
160	Sten Basse og Hans Frost 1433 (A-B)	D 219			Sten Basse vows to capture his wife's lover Hans Frost, and have his life.
161	Erik Puke 1437 (A-B)	C 29			Erik Puke is invited to home by Karl Knutsson, but it is a deathtrap and he is led away in chains and executed.
162	Kong Christoffer og Henrik Tagesøn 1441 (A-B)	C 30			
163	Iver Axelsøn Thott 1466-67 (A-B)	C 31			
164	Niels Paaskesøn og Lave Brok 1468	D 313			
165	Christian den første i Frisland 1472 (A-)	C 32			
166	Kong Hanses bryllup 1478 (A-D)	C 33			
167	Erik Styggesen Rosenkrands c. 1480 (A-G)	D 38			
168	Morten Venstermand c. 1490 (A-B)	D 35			
169	Kong Hans i Ditmarsken 1500	C 34			
170	Nederlaget i Ditmarsken 1500 (A-D)	—			
171	Tyge Krabbe i Skaane 1510 (A-C)	C 36, C 37, C 38			
172	Christian den Anden i Sverrig 1520 (A-B)	C 39			
173	Christian den Anden og adelen 1523	—			
174	Prindsesse Annas Bryllup 1548	—			
175	Frederik den Anden i Ditmarsken (A-F (Note: 175EF, vol. III))	D 436			
176	Arild Urup og Jomfru Tale Thott 1564 (A-B)	—			
177	Herredagen 1613	—			
178	Folke Lovmandsøn og Dronning Helvig c. 1280-90	D 233			
179	Herr Mattis og stolt Ingefred c. 1280-90	D 165			
180	Folke Algotsøn 1288 (A-K)	C 16			
181	Magnus Algotsøn (A-E)	C 15			
182	Karl Algotsøn (A-H)	C 18			
183	Kvindemorderen (A-G)	D 411	Lady Isabel and the Elf Knight (Child 4. I, 26)		
184	Den farlige Jomfru (A-H)	E 64			
185	Stolt Signild	D 308			
186	Skjoldmøen (A-H)	E 32			
187	Jomfruen af Vestervig	D 203			
188	Den fangne Fæstemand	E 31			
189	Mø værger Æren (A-E)	D 168			
190	Stolt Gundelil	D 303			
191	Grev Tue Henriksøn	D 180			
192	Fæstemøens Hævn	D 249	Blekman (SMB 149)		
193	Døttre hævne Fader (A-C)	D 354			
194	Herr Ebbes Døttre (A-C)	D 183			
195	Knud af Borg (A-E)	D 172			
196	Stolt Margrete	D 170			
197	Roselille Mø (A-B)	D 171			Maidservant Roselille knifes Hr. Peder bent on rape. Lady Lilje, in order to save herself from her brother Peder's incestuous lust, had delivered up her maid to the man despite being her friend.
198	Verkel Vejemandsøn	D 177			
199	Den afhugne Haand	D 173			
200	Løn som forskyldt (A-D)	D 131			
201	Hjælp i Nød (A-B)	D 167			
202	Oluf og Asser Hvid	D 174			
203	Herr Stranges Død (A-C)	D 208			
204	Herr Ivers Dom (A-B)	D 209			
205	Linden paa Lindebjærg (A-G)	D 121			
206	Vellemands Vanvid	D 256			
207	Hertugens Slegfred	D 244			
208	Frillens Hævn (A-D)	D 239	Young Hunting (Child 68. II, 143); Frillans hämnd (SMB 208)		
209	Stolt Elins Hævn	D 241			
210	Herr Peders Slegfred (A-B)	D 245	Lord Thomas and Fair Annet (Child 73. II, 180); Herr Peder och liten Kerstin (SMB 122)		
211	Sigvord Kongesøn (A-B)	D 238			
212	Utroskabs Straf (A-C)	D 210			
213	Fru Sidsels Hævn	D 240			
214	Lokkesangen (A-B)	D 316	Eg stóð so nær, lýddi hará (CCF 125)		
215	Stolt Bodils Hævn	D 242			
216	Herr Jons Bøder	D 120			
217	To Brude om en Brodgom (A-B)	D 122			
218	Stolt Ellensborg (A-M)	D 72	Young Beichan (Child 53. I, 459)		
219	Jomfru Amedy	D 429			
220	Stolt Elselille (A-E)	D 423			
221	Herr Enevolds Søster (A-D)	D 10			
222	Jomfruen paa Tinge (A-B)	D 4			
223	Brud og Bejler (A-B)	D 3			
224	Væddemaalet (A-L)	D 145	The Twa Knights (Child 268. V, 25)		Peder (Iver) boasts he can seduce any lady, and wagers life (property) and neckbone against Lange that he can succeed with the virtuous Ingelil, only to fail.
225	I Tugt og Ære (A-M)	D 125			
226	Hertug Henrik (A-F)	D 126			
227	Iver Himmerbo (A-B)	D 149			
228	Svar som Tiltale (A-B)	D 15			
229	Den forsmaaede Bejler (A-F)	D 146, D 147			
230	I Rosenslund (A-E)	D 98, D 150	The Baffled Knight (D 98, D 150) (Child 112. II, 482)		
231	Den dyre Kaabe (A-B)	D 97	The Baffled Knight (Child 112. I, 459, IV 495a)		
232	Mø fra Dandsen (A-B)	D 151			
233	Ellen Ovesdatter (A-E)	D 152			
234	Herr Palles Bryllup (A-H)	D 153			
235	Kvindelist	D 154			
236	Fru Gundelils Harpeslæt	D 406			
237	Jomfru ved Tavlebord (A-D)	D 398			
238	Tærningspillet (A-E)	D 399	The Knight and Shepherd's Daughter (Child 110. II, 458- IV, 492)		
239	Møens Morgendrømme (A-M)	D 397			
240	Venderkongens Jomfrurov (A-B)	D 428			
241	Skipper og Jomfru (A-D)	D 426			
242	Jomfruen af Østergaard	D 164			
243	Den fortryllende Sang (A-B)	D 14, D 405			
244	Den saarede Jomfru	D 14			
245	Guldsmedens Datter (A-C)	D 415	Dankungen och guldsmedens dotter (SMB 187)		
246	Jomfrustævnet (A-B)	D 1, D 127			
247	Ovelil og Tovelil (A-B)	D 225			
248	Gjord Borggreve	D 194			
249	Den trofaste Jomfru (A-I)	D 410	The Fair Flower of Northumberland (Child 9. I, 112); De sju guldbergen (SMB 184)		
250	Esbern og Sidsel (A-O)	D 195			
251	Skjønne Fru Sølverlad	D 197			
252	Troskabsprøven (A-H)	D 198, D 224	Trohetsprövningen (SMB 114)		
253	Junker Jakob (A-D)	D 199			
254	Tro som Guld (A-E)	D 200			
255	Slegfred og Brud	D 259	Thomas o Yonderdale (Child 253. II, 69); Brúnsveins vísa (CCF 119); Elja kvæði (ÍFkv 48); Brur vik for frilla (NMB 112)		
256	Troskabseden	D 113			
257	Den taalmodigé Kvinde	D 196			
258	Skjøn Anna (A-H)	—	Fair Annie (Child 62. II, 65 V 220b)		
259	Lave Stisøn og Fru Eline (A-I)	D 229			
260	Kvindetroskab (A-C)	D 114			
261	Mettelille Grevens Datter	D 192			
262	Grimmer af Axel vold (A-I)	D 230	Grímur á Aksalvølli (CCF 132)		
263	Liden Kirstins Dans (A-G)	D 416	Norwegian: Utsyn 100 (NMB 160)		
264	Dronningens Jomfru	D 119			
265	Jomfruens Harpeslæt (A-B)	D 115	Rosilias sorg (SMB 92)		
266	Søborg og Adelkind (A-I)	D 118	Den falska tärnan (SMB 93)		
267	Jomfru og Stalddreng (A-Å)	D 396	Child Waters (Child 63. II, 84 IV, 454a); Kerstin stalldräng (SMB 178)		
268	Bod for Vaande (A-F)	D 23			
269	Liden Gjertrud og Herr Børge (A-B)	D 116			
270	Bolde Herr Nilaus Søn	D 287	Leesome Brand (Child 15. I, 178, 180)		
271	Redselille og Medelvold (A-A*)	D 288	Leesome Brand (Child 15. I, 178-180, 182); Lisa och Nedervall (SMB 138)		
272	Sønnens Sorg (A-B)	D 289	Leesome Brand (Child 15. I, 179, 180, 182); Sonens sorg (SMB 139);		
273	Stalbroders Kvide (A-B)	D 290	Leesome Brand (Child 15. I, 179-)		
274	Brud ikke Mø (A-D)	D 421	Gil Brenton (Child 5. I, 64 IV 442b)		
275	Herr Find og Herr Vendelrod	D 420			
276	Ingelilles Bryllup (A-C)	D 417			
277	Brud i Vaande (A-K)	D 182	Brud i vånda (SMB 106)		
278	Peder og Malfred (A-D)	D 418			Child I, 65. "Sir Peter as riding away from home about a month after his marriage, and meeting a woman who informs him that there is a birth in his house. He returns, and asks who is the father. Sir Peters satisfies [he himself was rapist] by identifying the gifts, in ABCD"
279	Oluf og Elinsborg (A-C)	D 419	Herr Lage och jungfru Elinsborg (SMB 188)		
280	Iver Herr Jonsøn (A-F)	D 422			
281	Herr Nelaus og Dankongen	D 260	Herr Peder, liten Kerstin och konungen (SMB 130)		
282	Elline i Vaagestue (A-B)	D 110	Ros Elin och kejsare David (SMB 91)		
283	Fattig Ungersvend	D 8			
284	Mødet i Skov	D 12			
285	Grevens Datter af Vendel (A-F)	D 374	Olyckligt levnadslopp (SMB 168)		
286	Hustrus og Moders Klage (A-N)	D 377	Paris och Helena I (SMB 170)		
287	Svanelille	D 351			
288	Torbens Datter og hendes Faderbane	D 332			
289	Herr Erlands Vold og Straf (A-I)	D 336			
290	Ellens Sønner befri Fader (A-D)	D 372			
291	Ellenssønnerne hævne Fader (A-H)	D 330			
292	Harpespillet (A-B)	D 409			
293	Ung Axelvold (A-E)	D 123			
294	Karl Hittebarn (A-H)	D 434			
295	Sorte Grev Henrikssøn og Dronning af Opland (A-B)	D 234			
296	Iver og Erland (A-B)	D 349			
297	Liden Engel (A-N)	D 352			
298	Svend af Vollersløv (A-R)	E 96	Fause Foodrage (Child 89. II, 297 IV 479b) (Note: In Child II, 297, the Danish referred to as Ung Villum or "Young William", with A-variant's protagonist named as Svend of Voldesløv)		
299	Erland og Mattis (A-C)	D 331			
300	Kongen og Mattis' Fæstemø	D 102			
301	Anders Kongenssøn	D 75			
302	Trøjes Drab (A-C)	D 348			
303	Elsker dræbt af Broder (A-C)	D 333			
304	De hurtige Svar (A-D)	D 324	Clerk Saunders (Child 69. II 158, IV, 468a); Tore och hans syster (SMB 156)		
305	Hertug Frydenborg (A-H)	B 27, D 390	Lady Diamond (Child 269. V, 31)		
306	Utro Ridder (A-P)	—			
307	Den voldtagne Mø (A-F)	D 181			
308	Svanelil Eriksøn	D 131			
309	Knud Kejsersøn	D 248			
310	Den Indemurede Jomfru	D 343			
311	Adelbrand (A-M)	D 255			
312	Gøde og Hillelille (A-F)	D 185			
313	Malfred og Sallemand (A-D)	D 188			
314	Ebbe Galt (Herr Tidemand) (A-E)	D 178, D 179	The Knight and Shepherd's Daughter (Child 110. II, 458 IV, 492)		Ebbe Galt gets drunken, and in the woods asks farmer's wife to conduct him to town, but brutally ravishes her in her home. Farmer gains king's promises to make villain pay with his life. Ebbe turns out to be king's nephew, and ransom is offered, but Ebbe is carried off to die.
315	Oluf Pant c. 1475?	D 175			
316	"Den skaanske Biørn" fældet ca. 1350 (A-B)	D 341			
317	Bønderne dræber Herr Tidemand (A-B)	D 315			
318	Bueskytte som Blodhævner (A-B)	D 339			
319	Aage fælder Tord Iversøn (A-B)	D 340			
320	Ebbe Tygesøns Dødsridt (A-B)	D 309			
321	Herr Magnuses Dødsridt	D 309			
322	Rige Herr Holgers Hjemkomst	A 71			
323	Hr Peder stejles	D 308			
324	Palle dræbes (A-C)	D 334			
325	Nilus og Hillelil (A-C)	D 342			
326	Fældet for Vennelils Skyld	D 318			
327	Drab i Kongens Gaard	D 305			
328	Iver Ottesøn og Buske ca. 1360	D 314			
329	Oluf Strangesøns Dystridt (A-E)	D 300			
330	Palle, Baard og Liden	D 306			
331	Brune-Erik og Nilaus Buggesøn ca. 1335 (A-B)	D 302			
332	Nilus og Tidemand (A-L)	D 357			
333	Gunderaads Bejlen (A-B)	D 107			
334	Peder og Hertug Henrik	D 108			
335	Palle Tygesøn ved Kvindegilde (A-B)	D 358			
336	Markvor hængt som Hestetyv (A-B)	D 359	Riddar Malkolm fängslas för häststöld (SMB 163)		
337	Herr David og hans Stesønner (A-C)	B 18			
338	Herr Truelses Døtre (A-K)	B 21	Babylon, or The Bonnie Banks o Fordie (Child 14. I, 171)		Herr Truels's three daughters heading for mass are waylaid and killed by thee thieves, who lodge with the herr and are discovered to be not only the killers, the sisters' lost brothers. The thieves refuse to flee, and face punishment by beheading.
339	Pillegrimsmordet	B 19			
340	Svend i Rosensgaard (A-C)	D 320	Edward (ballad) (Child 13. I, 167-168); Sven i rosengård (SMB 153)		
341	Den forgivne Datter (A-B)	D 321	Lord Randal (Child 12. V, 286); Den lillas testamente (SMB 154)		
342	Volmers Hustru levende begravet (A-D)	D 271			
343	Fæstemøen levende begravet	D 272			
344	Giftblandersken (A-B)	D 273			
345	Utro Fæstemø vil forgive sin Fæstemand (A-C)	D 275			
346	Herr Peder forgiven af Kæresten	D 325			
347	Jomfru myrder Fader og Fæstemand	D 322			
348	Hor og Mord (A-B)	D 246			
349	Hyrde og Ridderfrue (A-C)	D 247			
350	Tule Slet, Ove Knar og Fru Magnild	D 323			
351	Bonde Høg og Hustrus Boler	D 237			
352	Svend Bosøns Fæstemø	D 223			
353	Jon rømmer af Land (A-C)	D 106			
354	Ebbe Skammelsøn (A-M)	D 251			
355	Utro Fæstemø (A-D)	D 252			
356	Utro Slegfred (A-B)	D 253			
357	Herr Tavl og hans Mø (A-E)	D 250			
358	Den spotske Brud	D 356			
359	Herr Bondes Viv	D 221			
360	Fru Mettelils Utroskab (A-C)	D 220			
361	Hekseridtet	D 367			
362	Den overbærende Ægtemand (A-C)	D 218			
363	Tyge Hermandsøn hævner Spot (A-C)	D 191			
364	Sorte Tørning	D 189			
365	Sorte Iver (A-C)	F 23			
366	Nidvisen (A-B)	D 190			
367	Herr Lave af Lund og den spotske Mø (A-C)	D 135			
368	Germand Smed og Præstens Datter (A-C)	F 24			
369	Rakkerens Brud	F 26	Tiggargubbens brud (SMB 236)		
370	Bondedrengen (A-C)	F 22	Bonddrängen och jungfrun (SMB 233)		
371	Forsmaat Bejlers Voldtægt	D 187			
372	Kong Erik og den spotske Jomfru (A-B)	D 156			
373	Ildebrand i Brudehuset	D 292			
374	Fæstemand og Fæstemø i Skibbrud (A-E)	D 269			
375	Jon Remorsøns Død paa Havet ca. 1230 (A-F)	D 360	Sir Patrick Spens (Child 58. (Note: It is not Child himself but Gruntivg, VI, p.374 who pairs it with Child 58. Elsewhere, both Child 57 & 58 are coupled to DgF 376 according to David Buchan (1985), "Traditional Patterns and the Religious Ballads, cited by Sigurd Kværndrup (2006), Den østnordiske ballade))		
376	Herr Peders Skriftemaal paa Havet (A-B)	D 361	Herr Peders sjöresa (SMB 164); Brown Robyn's Confession (Child 57. II, 13 (Note: Danish ballad title given as "Jon Rimaardssøns Skriftemaal"))		
377	Danneved og Svend Trøst (A-B)	D 307			
378	Den genfundne Søster (A-N)	D 370			
379	Herr Vilmer genfinder sin Fæstemø (A-B)	D 371			
380	Havfruens Tærne	A 51	Havsfruns tärna (SMB 23), Terna hjaa havfrua		
381	Svend og hans Søster (A-G)	D 90			
382	Kejserens Datter (A-B)	D 89			
383	Verner kommer af Fangetaarn (A-B)	D 407			
384	Krybskyttens Sang (A-B)	D 408			
385	Krybskyttens Frelse (A-B)	D 373			
386	Tyvene (A-B)	F 75	Tjuvarna (SMB 260)		
387	Lovmand og Tord (A-N)	D 45	Herr Lagman bortför herr Tors brud (SMB 71)		
388	Nilus Samsings Brud	D 44			
389	Karl Høvding (A-I)	D 55			
390	Lave og Jon (A-F)	F 11			
391	Tyge Hermandsøn (A-B)	D 213			
392	Palle Bosøns Død (A-E)	D 163			
393	Broderlig Troskab (A-C)	D 56			
394	Svend Dyrings Bruderov (A-B)	D 51			
395	Herr Erik af Sverig (A-C)	D 54			
396	Tre Søstre gifte (A-C)	D 49			
397	Albret bortfører Bruden (A-D)	D 52			
398	Terkel Tagesøn	D 48			
399	Ridder Stig og Skottekongens Datter	D 161			
400	Stalt Sidsellils Bortførelse (A-B)	D 42			
401	Ridder stjæler Fæstemø af Gaard	D 41			
402	Liden Tilventin	D 39			
403	Peder hjemfører sin Jomfru	D 18			
404	Jomfru bortført fra Engen	D 162			
405	Bortførelsen	D 17			
406	Kongen og Klosterjomfruen	D 267			
407	Adelus tages af Kloster (A-G)	D 34			
408	Herr Mortens Klosterrov (A-E)	D 36	Willie's Lyke-Wake (Child 25. IV, 453b)		
409	Herr Karl paa Ligbaare (A-K), or Klosterranet	D 37	Willie's Lyke-Wake (Child 25. I, 247 (Note: Child's index gives Danish ballad title as Klosterranet)); Herr Karl och klosterjungfrun (SMB 70)		Herr Karl fakes death to win beloved's heart. She is tricked and keeps vigil, and weepingly whispers she loved him, at which Karl wakes laughing. Despite suspicions of his being mere seducer, he honorably asks parents for her hand in marriage.
410	Herr Eskilds Fole	D 67			
411	Herr Peder rider til Jomfrubur	D 129			
412	Herr Saksel (A-C)	D 68			
413	Herr Vilkor (A-F)	A 41, D 63, D 68, D 77			
414	Medelferd og Ellen (A-E)	D 66			
415	Herr Hjælmer (A-F)	D 78			
416	Ridder fælder Jomfruens syv Brødre (A-G)	D 69	The Bent Sae Brown (Child 71. II, 170 (Note: Child's index gives Danish ballad title as Jomfruens Brødre. B is Jomfruen i Skoven, Tragica, No. 15.))		
417	Den listige Kæreste (A-B)	D 262			
418	Peder Henriksøn (A-N)	D 70			
419	Nilus Olufsøn og Svend Bonde (A-E)	D 58			
420	Hans af Bern	D 40			
421	Daniel Bosøn (A-M)	D 304			
422	Herr Grønnevold (A-G)	D 62			
423	Herr Oluf og Kongens Datter (A-N)	D 33			
424	Nilus Strangesøns Stenstue 1408?	D 369			
425	I Grevens Tjæneste (A-C)	D 9			
426	Erik og Adelraad (A-C)	D 112			
427	Knud Hyrde (A-B)	D 394			
428	Brudebytte (A-F)	D 103			
429	Bjørn og den norske Kongebrud (A-B)	D 101			
430	Kong Gørels Datter (A-F)	D 31			
431	Karl og Rigmor (A-P)	D 29			
432	Karl af Nørrejylland (A-l)	D 32			
433	Grev Henrik og Kongens Søster (A-F)	D 30			
434	Liden Kirstins Harm	D 93			
435	Herr Peder og hans Søster	D 92			
436	Sverkel og hans Søster (A-B)	D 88			
437	Søster beder Broder (A-B)	D 91			
438	Broder myrder Søster	D 95			
439	Herr Østmand	D 96			
440	Ørnen sidder paa højen Hald (A-N)	D 98			
441	Forlokkelse og Fortvivlelse (A-N)	D 132			
442	Fortvivlelsen (A-F)	D 133			
443	Lindens Varsel (A-C)	D 297			
444	Ridder og Jomfru dør for hinanden	D 298			
445	Esben og Malfred (A-Z)	D 291	Herr Peder och fru Malfred (SMB 140)		
446	Herr Magnus og hans Mø (A-G)	D 279	Lord Lovel (Child 75. II, 205 (Note: Child gives Danish analogue by the title Den elskedes Død = Kristensen II, No. 20 = DgF 446B. A-B has Herr Peder, L-M has Hr. Magnus)); Dödsbudet (SMB 132)		
447	Herr Olufs Brud dør af Længsel	D 281			
448	Gunder dør af Længsel (A-B)	D 282			
449	Frue følger Elsker til Grav	D 217			
450	For silde	D 157			
451	Hustru og Elskerinde (A-B)	D 204, D 276			
452	Rige Herr Tord (A-G)	D 64			
453	Dronning skiller elskende (A-B)	D 81			
454	Konge skiller elskende (A-B)	D 82			
455	Benedikt Knudsøns Fæstemø dør (A-D)	D 80			
456	Herr Bjørns Fæstemø gaar i Kloster (A-C)	D 100			
457	Herr Olufs Fæstemø drukner sig (A-B)	D 160			
458	Kærestens Død (A-M)	D 280	Kärestans död		
459	Herr Oluf dør paa Bryllupsdagen	D 285			
460	Fæstemanden dør (A-F)	D 284	Fästmannen dör (SMB 136)		
461	Inges Død og sidste Vilje (A-D)	D 283			
462	Herr Peder lærer sin Fæstemø (A-F)	D 144			
463	Fæstemø lyder ej Herr Peder	D 263			
464	Jomfruens Straf (A-F)	D 71			
465	Haagens Dans	D 227			
466	Iver Jonsøn rømmer af Land	D 228			
467	Paris og Dronning Ellen	D 381			
468	Kong David og Solfager	D 392	John Thomson and the Turk (Child 266. V, 8); (Note: Child gives DgF No 472, but identifies it as Kristenson X, 82 which is this ballad.) David och Solfager (SMB 174); Solfager og Ormekongin (Nor.)		
469	Allegast	D 387			
470	Tistram og Isold	D 384			
471	Tistram og Jomfru Isolt	D 385			
472	Orm Ungersvends Fadermord	D 389			
473	Hr Bjørn paa Sønderborg	D 431			
474	Ismar og Benedikt	D 432			
475	Aslag Tordsøn og skøn Valborg	D 87			
476	Hertugen af Skare	D 327			
477	Giselmaar	D 74			
478	Iver Jarlens Søn	E 42			
479	Knud af Myklegaard	E 57			
480	Terkel Trundesøn	D 201			
481	Nilus og Adelus	D 85			
482	Sallemand dør af Elskov	D 86			
483	Nilus og Mettelille	D 83			
484	Benedikt faar Enken	D 202			
485	Erik og Lisbet	—			
486	Fæstemand løskøber Fæstemø	D 391	The Maid Freed from the Gallows (Child 95. II, 347-348); Frísa vísa (CCF 129); Den bortsålda (SMB 173)		
487	Den udkaarne Ridder	—			
488	Jomfruens Gæst	A 64			
489	Overvunden Klosterlyst	D 20			
490	Den giftesyge Datter (A-C)	F 1			
491	Den aftvungne Gæstfrihed	F 48			
492	Junker Ottos Bryllup	D 138			
493	Ridder og Jomfru i Abildgaard (A-B)	D 109, D 186			
494	Herr Magnus faar sin elskede (A-B)	D 24			
495	Kongen gør de elskendes Bryllup (A-B)	D 26			
496	Fattig Jomfru giftes (A-I)	D 22			
497	Dronning forener de elskende	D 25			
498	Henrik Valdemarsøn (A-G)	D 99			
499	Rige Ridder giftes (A-E)	D 2			
500	Rige Ridder og Jomfru (A-D)	D 19			
501	Ridder gæster Jomfru	D 13			
502	Bejler i Lunden	D 73			
503	Frieriet (A-E)	D 7			
504	Bejlekunsten	D 140, D 141, D 142			
505	Falkenes Budskab	A 34			
506	Den favre liden Fugl (A-B)	A 36			
507	Falken og Duen	—			
508	Bassen paa Okdenskov	—			
509	Ungersvends Drøm (A-D)	—			
510	Forsmaaet Bejlers Spot	—			
511	Ungersvends Klagesang	D 214			
512	Elskovsklage	D 216			
513	Nonnens klage (A-G)	D 376			
514	Brudens Gaver (A-E)	—			
515	Norden for Trondhjem (A-C)	—			
516	Jeg ved saa dejlig en Urtegaard	—			
517	Til Kongens Gaard vil jeg drage	—			
518	Limgris	F 61			
519	Hagen Kongens Søn	D 438			
520	Peder Oxe	—			
521	Elfsborg Høvidsmand	—			
522	Bjaergmand lokker Mø	A 56			
523	Jomfru narrer Dværgen	A 58			
524	Sallemand Ravn	D 265			
525	Forvandlingerne	A 31			
526	Lokket med runer	A 7			
527	Per Svinedreng	D 395	Per Svinaherde (SMB 177)		
528	Fru Ingelil og hendes døtre	B 35			
529	Barnemordersken	B 36	The Cruel Mother (Child 20. I, 218-, IV, 451a)	A, without title (begins "Little Kirsten took with her the bower-women five,") is translated in Child I, 219.	
530	De syv Børnesjæle	B 37			
531	Mariæ Bebudelse	B 1			
532	Kristi Fødsel (b)	—			
533	Flugten til Ægypten	B 3	The Carnal and the Crane (Child 55 (Note: Not identified by Child, but equivalence given in Sigurd Kværndrup (2006), Den østnordiske ballade, p.330n, citing David Buchan (1985), "Traditional Patterns and the Religious Ballads.))		
534	Jesu Liv	B 5			
535	Synd og Bod	A 13			
536	Den døende Foged	B 34			
537	De Søfarne mænd	B 26			
538	Den onde som Bejler	—			
539	Rige og fattige Søster	B 30			

== See also ==
- List of Sveriges Medeltida Ballader
- List of folk song collections

== Footnotes ==
=== Explanatory notes ===
Table notes on additional variants in later DgF volumes

Additional notes
