= The Troll's Daughter =

Danish folk tale

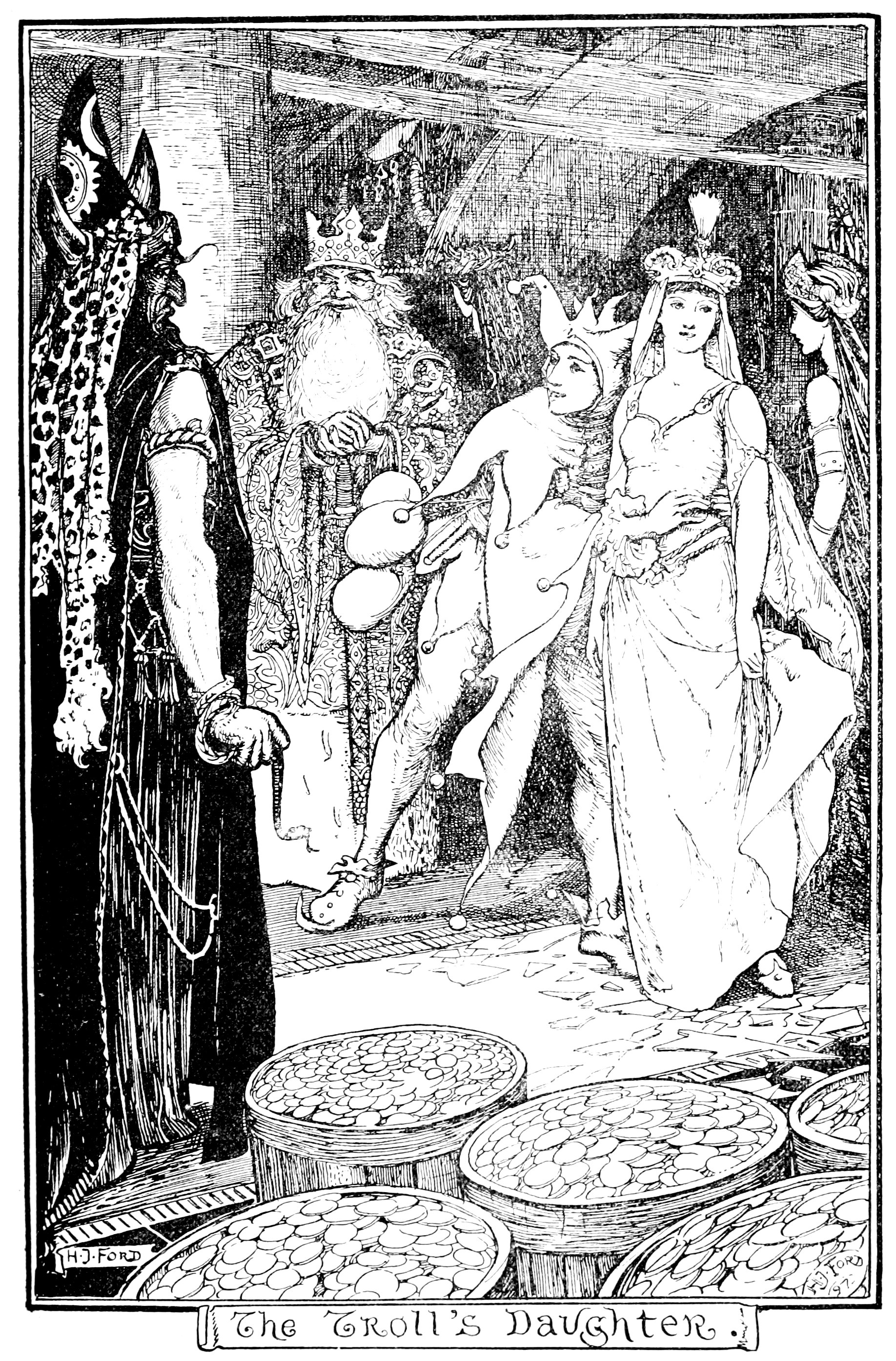
Illustration from The Pink Fairy Book

The Troll's Daughter (Danish: Troldens datter) is a Danish folktale from Svend Grundtvig's collection (1876), whose English translation was published by Andrew Lang in The Pink Fairy Book (1897).

== Textual notes ==
The Danish original "Troldens datter" is included in Svend Grundtvig's Danske folkeæventyr (1876). Evald Tang Kristensen also published a version in 1884, noting that his transcribed text was collected before Gruntvig's publication.

Andrew Lang's translation "The Troll's Daughter" occurs in fairy tale anthology The Pink Fairy Book (1897), though he does not elaborate on his source beyond that it was "from the Danish". J. Grant Cramer translated it as "The Wizard's Daughter" in Danish Fairy Tales (1919). Ruth Manning-Sanders included it, as "The Troll's Little Daughter", in A Book of Ogres and Trolls (1972).

== Synopsis ==
A stranger gives an employment to a boy offering him bushels (Danish: skjæppe) of money (Note: The payment is counted in skjæppe is equivalent to 17.39 liters, about 1/2 bushel. He is offered 1 half-bushel for the first year, 2 for the second, 3 for the third for 6 half-bushels total.) at the end of each year for three years, provided he obeyed instructions absolutely. And the boy agrees.

The youth's employer turned out to be a troll who had dominion over the creatures of the great forest (and even kings of men, as it later turns out). The first day, the youth's assignment was to feed the wild animals in the forest, the wolves, bears, deer, and hare, which the troll had tied up. (Note: This detail (Danish: "Ulve og Bjørne, Hjorte og Harer") appears in Grundtvig (1881), p. 25, but is wanting in Kristensen (1884).) The following day, the troll transformed him into a hare and set him wild to run the year long. Every hunter tried to get him, as the only animal in the forest, but no dog could catch him and no gun shoot him. At the end of the year, the youth returned and earned 1 bushel (skjæppe).

The youth's assignment was similar the second year. He fed the animals, was transformed into a raven, evaded hunters for a year, earning 2 bushels as promised. The final year, he was transformed into a fish. Deep in the sea, he found a glass castle (Danish: glasslot) inhabited by a lonely, beautiful maiden. By remembering the incantation the troll had used, he turned back into human form and befriended her, and during the time spent together he grew into a man who was no longer a lad (Danish: karl og ikke dreng).

As time drew near for the troll to come collect him, the maiden warned that he would have to revert to fish-form to survive the journey through sea. She revealed herself to be the imprisoned daughter of the troll, and proceeded to describe a detailed plan which the youth must follow in order for them to be reunited as couple:

The young man was to enter the service of a king, who was going to lose his head for being unable to repay his debt to the troll. He should offer the king a loan to clear the debt (six bushels of coins which the youth had earned), and in return, insist on accompanying the king as the fool, or royal jester, and purposely break the windows or whatever to draw the troll's ire. Consequently, even when the loan has been discharged, the troll will hold the king responsible for the damages and sentence him to death, unless three questions could be correctly answered. The daughter even predicted the questions, which would be 1) "Where's my daughter ?" and "Do you know her?" (identify her from among all her likenesses), 2) "Where is my heart?" and "Would you know the fish?" (identify the fish that contains his heart). And with that, they would have the means to kill the troll. (Note: The demarcation of where the first question ends is ambiguous initially, but the tale itself proclaims that "the first riddle was solved" when the maiden who pinched the youth to let him know she was the real one. The troll is killed before he gives a third riddle.)

The youth became the king's stableman, then all went as the daughter planned, and she was there to indicate which fish contained the troll's heart. The youth cut open the fish, then sliced the heart; the troll fell dead and turned into flint stones. This destroyed all the bonds the troll had from the kings in debt to him, and freed all the wild animals. The youth married the maiden. All the kings freed from the troll's debt hailed him as their emperor.

== Parallels ==
When the Danish youth must solve the riddle of discovering the true daughter of the troll among the fake shadows, she is among the last of the maiden shown to him; likewise in a Russian wonder-tale, Sadko chooses the river nymph Chernava who is the very last of three batches of one hundred maidens shown him by the Sea Tsar. This common motif shared by the two tales was pointed out by Axel Olrik. (Note: n his analysis of the ballad Herr Peders Skriftemaal paa Havet (DgF 376) which is analogous to the English ballad "Brown Robyn's Confession and "Sadko".)

The means of the troll's defeat is reminiscent of the tale type AT 302 "The Ogre's (Devil's) Heart in the Egg", as noted by Carsten Høgh.

== See also ==
- King Kojata
- The White Dove

== Explanatory notes ==
=== References ===
Citations

Bibliography

- Grundtvig, Sven, ed. (1876). "Troldens datter". Danske folkeæventyr: efter utrykte kilder gjenfortalte. Vol. 2. Copenhagen: C. A. Reitzel. pp. 24–37. hdl:2027/osu.32435006730741.
- Grundtvig, Sven, ed. (1881) [1876]. "2. Troldens datter". Danske folkeæventyr: efter utrykte kilder gjenfortalte. Vol. 2. Copenhagen: C. A. Reitzel. pp. 24–37.
- Lang, Andrew, ed. (1897). "The Troll's Daughter" . The Pink Fairy Book . H. J. Ford (illustrator). New York, London and Bombay: Longmans, Green, and Co. pp. 247–257 – via Wikisource.
- Kristensen, Evald Tang, ed. (1884). "3. Troldens datter". Jyske folkeminder, isser fra Hammerumharred: Aeventyr fra Jylland. Vol. 2. Copenhagen: Kalrl Schønberg. pp. 18–25.
