= Thomas o Yonderdale =

Traditional song

Thomas o Yonderdale is an English-language folk song, catalogued as Child ballad number 253 and Roud number 3890. Child assessed that this "apocryphal" ballad seemed like a recent fabrication from a pastiche of other ballads.

== Synopsis ==
Lady Maisry had many suitors to choose from. It was Thomas of Yonderdale who "gaind the love o this ladie," but once deprived of her virginity Thomas ceased coming near her bower. One day he passes by and overhears her speaking to the young son she bore by him, reproaching the father's neglect. Thomas is moved to tears, and declares he is come to "comfort" her. She reminds him of his earlier empty promise of marriage, and Thomas avows he will make good on the promise and marry her when he returns from voyage overseas.

Despite her wish for a storm, it is fine weather on Saturday, and he sails off to his destination (England, according to Buchan) where he tarries three months and seduces another maiden. Then Lady Maisry appears in a dream upbraiding his infidelity. He summons his errand boy at night to carry a letter to Lady Maisry. The boy promises to do so even if his legs gave out and he had to crawl in the dark. Thomas instructs that Lady Maisry be dressed in a silk gown and cramasie (crimson cloth) coat, and be given a horse to ride with bells on the tips of its mane, and fine trappings. She thus arrives, and appears as magnificent as the Scottish queen in the eyes of Thomas's would-be-bride (an Englishwoman, according to Buchan). Thomas's boy then explains that the guest is no queen but Thomas's first love, at which the pretender bride despairs that he will never choose herself over this rival, and indeed, when Lady Maisry confronts Thomas about what his intent was, Thomas declares his will to marry Lady Maisry. The jilted bride then asks what is in store for her, and is only offered a ride home in a fine coach. She negotiates to have Thomas cede two-thirds of his land to his brother, and arrange to have her marry the brother. But Thomas refuses to part with his land, and says he has no power to choose a bride for his brother.

== Parallels ==
Svend Grundtvig felt that this Scottish ballad, despite its suspicious and derivative nature, was probably based on an earlier form analogous to the Scandinavian ballad group represented by Danish Slegfred og Brud "Mistress and Bride" (DgF 255). Other cognates in this group are the Icelandic Elja kvæði (ÍF 48), Faroese Brúnsveins vísa (CCF 119), and the Norwegian Bendik og Videmø.. Francis J. Child makes hint of this parallel in passing, under the chapter for another Scottish ballad, No. 62 Fair Annie.

It may be noted that the Scandinavian ballad group is categorized TSB D 259: "Bride gives up bride-groom so that he may marry mistress". This is not what happens in "Thomas of Yonderdale," though it is what happens in Fair Annie and the Danish Skjøn Anna where the would-be-bride recognizes the mistress Annie/Anna as her long lost sister abducted abroad. Modern scholars however conclude that the Scandinavian ballad of Anna is of later composition, derived from a German original (Die schöne Hannale), and do not assign a TSB number to the Skjøn Anna group.
