= Trolden og Bondens Hustru =

Song
- Written: 1500s
- Genre: Danish ballad

Trolden og Bondens Hustru ('The troll and the farmer's wife') is a Danish ballad (The Types of the Scandinavian Medieval Ballad A 14, Disenchantment by kiss; Danmarks gamle Folkeviser 52).

The ballad is attested only in Denmark, in our earliest Danish ballad-manuscripts: version A in Karen Brahes Folio (1570s), B in Langebeks Folio.

== Summary ==
According to the Types of the Scandinavian Medieval Ballad,

A pack of trolls comes to a farm to chase the farmer away, and one of them wants the farmer's wife. All the trolls are asked to sit down to eat and drink, and the wife has to kiss the troll ... At this he turns into a knight who thanks her, but she prefers to stay with her husband.

In version C, the kiss is a rape, and the farmer's wife marries the knight.
