= Ungersven och havsfrun =

Song

Ungersven och havsfrun (as it is known in Swedish) or Herr Bøsmer i elvehjem (as it is known in Danish) (The Types of the Scandinavian Medieval Ballad A 49, Drink causes forgetfulness and makes man stay with mermaid) is a supernatural ballad type. Known witnesses are edited in Sveriges Medeltida Ballader (no. 21) in ten Swedish variants (of which one is in Finland Swedish), from the mid-1700s onwards; five of the Swedish variants are recorded with melodies. It appears in Danmarks gamle folkeviser (no. 45), among the earliest manuscripts to contain it being Karen Brahes Folio.

== Content ==
In most variants, a mermaid comes to a young knight and while he is asleep she asks him to come to her home in the river (or sea). The next day he goes out riding, falls into the river, and so arrives at the mermaid's side. In most variants he receives a drink which either makes him forget his family and fiancée and stay with the mermaid.

In some Norwegian versions, instead of a mermaid the supernatural woman is an elf in a mountain. In some Swedish versions, the drink is poisonous and the knight dies. In others he escapes by playing his harp: in a Swedish variant G (from Brita Cajsa Carlsdotter from Östergötland, collected by L. Chr. Wiede in the 1840s) the young man saves himself by playing beautifully on his golden harp, rather like in the ballad Harpans kraft.

== Recordings ==
- The group Folk och rackare recorded a version based on Sveriges Medeltida Ballader 21B: Herr Olof och havsfrun, on the record Folk och rackare, 1976.
