= Harpans kraft =

Supernatural ballad type

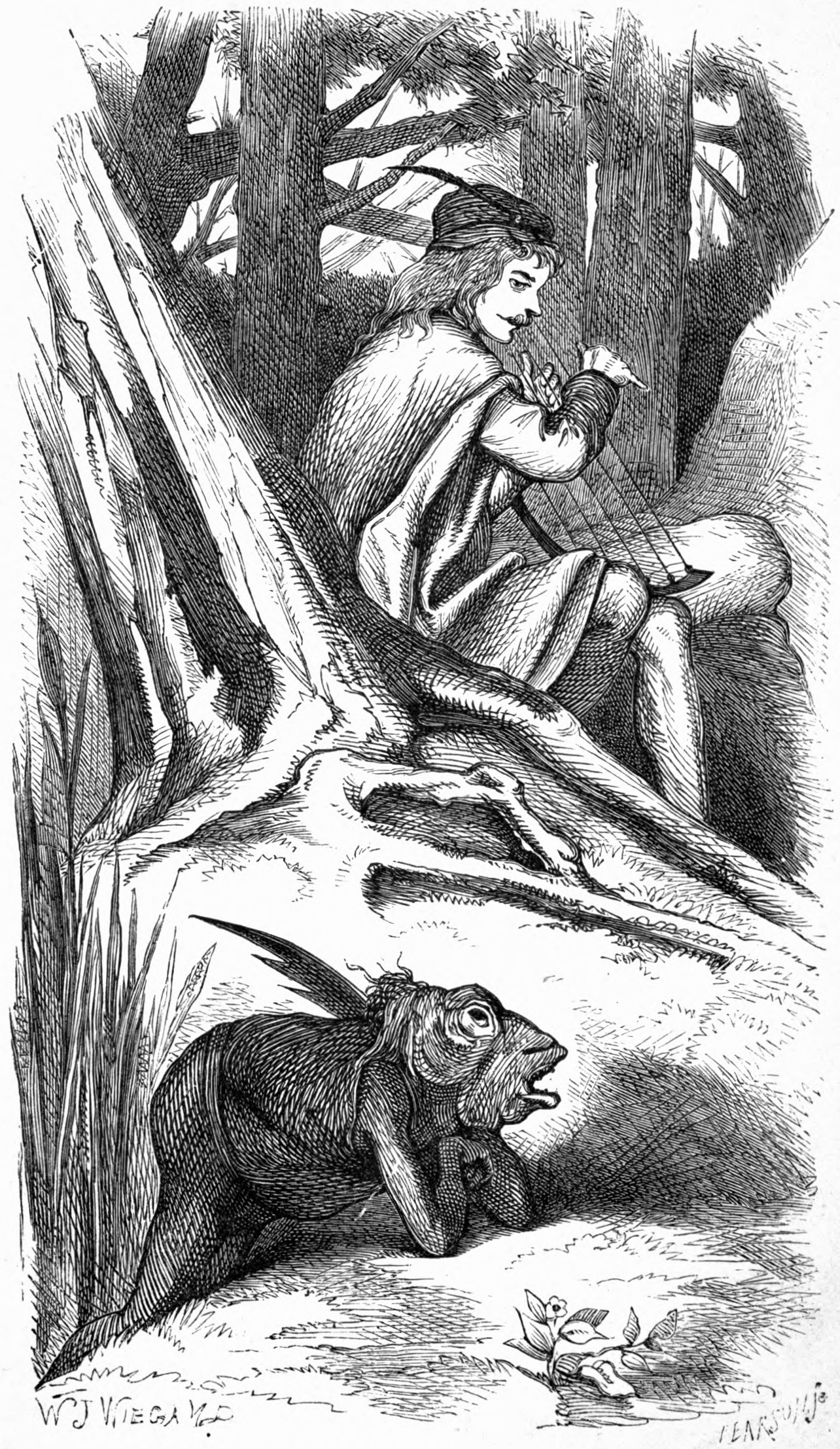
"Sir Peter and the Ugly Sprite," (illustr. W. J. Wiegand). —from Julia Goddard, "Christin's Trouble" (1870), prose tale version of the ballad type.

Swedish version performed by the traditional ballad singer Svea Jansson in 1958. Recorded by the musicologist Matts Arnberg.

Harpens kraft (Danish) or Harpans kraft, meaning "The Power of the Harp", is the title of a supernatural ballad type, attested in Danish, Swedish, Norwegian, and Icelandic variants.

In The Types of the Scandinavian Medieval Ballad it is catalogued type A 50, "Man saves his bride from merman by playing his harp".

The ballad type tells of a hero whose betrothed has premonitions of a fall from a bridge into the river, which despite the hero's assurances and precautions comes true. But by the power of his harp-playing, he regains his bride from the river creature, which is referred to as a "merman" in the TSB catalog: while "merman" (havmand) occurs in a variant, it is called a troll in the older Danish text, and a "neck (nix)" in the Swedish text.

The ballad of this type occur under the following titles. Danish: "Harpens kraft" (DgF 40); Swedish: "Harpans kraft" (SMB 22); Norwegian: Villemann og Magnhild (NMB 26); Gaute og Magnild and Guðmund og Signelita (Landstad 51 and 52), etc.; and Icelandic: Gautakvæði "Gauti's ballad" (IFkv 3). (Note: Bibliographical list of analogue ballads in different languages, given in The Types of the Scandinavian Medieval Ballad under A 50.)

Noted for its resemblance to the Greek myth of Orpheus, a harp-player with mystical powers, it may be related to medieval versions of that story such as the Middle English Sir Orfeo.

Similarity has also been noted with the supernatural power of the harp in the Scottish ballad Glasgerion (Child ballad 67 variants B, C, "He'd harpit a fish out o saut water", etc.).

== Common plot ==
A bridegroom asks his betrothed why she is so sorrowful. At last she answers that she is going to fall into a river on her way to her wedding (as her sisters have done before her, in some Danish, Norwegian, and Swedish variants). The man promises to build a broad, strong bridge over the river, and he and his men will protect her. Despite all precautions taken, the maiden's horse stumbles (or rears up) while over the bridge, and she tumbles into the river. The man has his golden harp brought to him and plays so beautifully that the "merman" (Danish: nøkke; Swedish: neck (Note: "Der Necken", with the "-en" being the definite article suffix.)) is forced to return his betrothed. (Note: Larsen's summary consults Jonsson et al., TSB summary, but differs somewhat.)

There exist Danish, Norwegian and Swedish variants where the water spirit restores the bride's two other sisters (or however many) who had been previously taken by the creature. The Icelandic version has a tragic ending, and the hero only recovers his bride's corpse.

A list of available translations of the ballads from various Scandinavian languages are given under English Translations below.

== Danish version ==
The Danish analogue is Harpens kraft (Danmarks gamle Folkeviser no. 40). There are six versions (DgF 40A–F), taken mostly from manuscripts such as Karen Brahes Folio of the 1570s (Variant A). There is a broadside copy dating to 1778 (designated variant E). Another recension (variant F) has Swedish provenance, being copied out of a manuscript written in 1693 by a Swede in Næsum parish, Skåne County, Sweden, but Grundtvig counted it as a Danish example since the language was Danish, and it was suitable for comparing with text E. In Danish variants, the troll ("throld(en)", DgF 40A; "trold(en)", D) is called havtroll (C (Note: Variant C, Stanza 16. "haffthrolden".)), havmand (E), or vandman (F).

Translations under the title "The Power of the Harp" exist, including one by R. C. Alexander Prior (1860) and by George Borrow (1913, 1923).

== Swedish version ==
Geijer and Afzelius published three variants of Harpans kraft (GA 91, or in the later edition with Bergström, GAB 75). Altogether, the Swedish form is attested in Sveriges Medeltida Ballader (SMB 22) in 49 variants (two of which are from Finland) from the 1690s onward (21 variants of which have melodies). It may be noted that the oldest variant included in SMB is the same as that catalogued as Danish ballad variant DgF 40F mentioned above, and which the early Swedish collectors concurred was a "half-Danish" specimen.

Geijer and Afzelius's first variant (GA 91.1=SMB 22 H) localized in Östergötland has been translated as "Power of the Harp" by Edward Vaughan Kenealy (1864). The third variant (GA 91.3 =SMB 22J) from Västergötland and Vermland was translated by Thomas Keightley in his "The Fairy Mythology" (1828). (Note: GAB gives localization to GA 1 and 3, but for GA 2 merely states it is from another tradition.)

In the first variant (Kenealy tr.), the hero and bride are anonymous and merely called "young swain" (ungersven) and maiden, whereas in the third variant (Keightley tr.) they are named "Peder" and "Liten Kerstin" respectively.

The name of the feared river may be given as Vernamo river (GA 1), Ringfalla (GA 3), or Renfalla, Vendels, etc. A version explains the bride's guardsmen abandoned her side to go hunting when they spotted a "hart with gilded horns" in Ringfalla woods (GA 3, Keightley's translation).

The motif of harp-playing which forces a supernatural being to act in a certain way is also found in Sveriges Medeltida Ballader 21 G of Ungersven och havsfrun (which also ends happily). Conversely, the plot of variant 20 L (Necken bejlare) is very similar to this ballad type, except that the bride's rescue by the harp has been deleted (and thus the ballad ends unhappily).

== Norwegian version ==
In Norway the ballad is generally known as Villemann og Magnhild and catalogued as Norske mellomalderballadar (NMB) no. 26. There are some 100 variants, although this count tallies up many fragmentary redactions only a few stanzas long.

Some variants are known by other titles: Harpespelet tvingar nykken in Leiv Heggstad's collection, and two specimens called Gaute og Magnild and Guðmund og Signelita in the anthology compiled by Landstad (1853).

The version most often met in Norwegian songbooks today is Knut Liestøl and Moltke Moe's 32-stanza reconstructed text (1920). A full translation is given in Heidi Støa's paper (2008). It resembles the 22-stanza text printed by Grundtvig (as a Norwegian variant to DgF 40c). (Note: Provided to Grundtvig by Sophus Bugge, transcribed by Hans Ross of Fyresdal, Telemark, in 1874.)

=== Norwegian summary ===
The Liestøl/Moe ballad begins as follows (the recurring "burden" (Note: Variants have different burdens altogether, and some employ a sort of double burden or a "inner refrain" (Cf. §Burden below).) is italicized):

1. Villemann og hass møy så prud,
dei leika gulltavl i hennar bur.
Så liflig leika Villemann for si skjønn jomfru

1. Villemann and his maid so fair
played tafl game of gold in her bower. (Note: "played at draughts" tr. Espeland; "game of golden pieces" tr. Støa)
So delightfully Villemann played for his maiden fair.

—Adapted from Støa's tr., Espeland tr.

Villemann perceives that his beloved Magnill is weeping as the dice is cast while playing the board game (stanza 2). He makes a series of guesses why she is crying: "Cry you for fields, or cry you for meadows, etc.", and she replies she cries for none of these things (3 ~ 6). She cries because she knows she is destined for imminent death: her fair skin lying in the "darkling mould" (earth), her yellow hair rotting in "Vendel's river", having fallen from the "Blide bridge" like her sisters (7 ~ 9).

The remainder follows the typical pan-Scandinavian pattern, except for a final conclusion. Thus the hero's promise to fortify bridge with pillars of lead and steel, and men riding alongside her, her protest of futility (10 ~ 15), her horse (shod with horseshoes and nails of red gold) rearing up on hind legs, her fall into the river (16 ~ 18), (Note: Støa renders "red golden seams", but "nails" for fastening the horseshoes is called for here. Nynorsk: saum (2) "(større) spikar; nagle til å feste..," etc., corrected from "golden seams") Villemann's playing golden harp from golden case, his playing mounts with ever more wondrous effects on nature (19 ~ 26). Finally the nykkjen (nøkken) releases one, then two (of her arms?), and pleads to bring stillness to his waters. But the hero refuses, and "the shatters against the hard stone" (nykkjen han sprakk i hardan stein). (Note: Støa renders as "nøkken he turned to hardened stone", but sprakk, preterite case of verb sprekke is recorded elsewhere and applied to tree barks shattering by the playing of the harp.)

The full text of the version of Liestøl and Moltke Moe's reconstructed text is as follows:

1. Villemann og hass møy så prud, dei leika gulltavl i hennar bur.
— Så liflig leika Villemann for si skjønn jomfru
2. Kvòr go ng gullterningjen rann omkring, så rann det ei tår på Magnills kinn.
3. "Græt'e du åker, ell græt'e du eng, ell græt'e du det at du sov i mi seng?"
4. "Græt'e du gull, ell græt'e du jord, ell græt'e du det at du sat ved mitt bord?"
5. "Eg græt inkje åker, eg græt inkje eng, eg græt inkje det at eg sov i di seng."
6. "Eg græt inkje gull, eg græt inkje jord, eg græt alli det at eg sat ved ditt bord."
7. "Eg græt'e meir fyr mitt kvite hold, at det må kje koma i svartan mold."
8. "Eg græt'e meir fyr mitt gule hår, at det må kje rotne i Vendels å."
9. "Eg græt'e så mykje fyr Blide-bru, der sokk til bonns mine systrar tvo."
10. "Magnill, Magnill still din gråt: eg skò bygggje bru ivi Vendels å."
11. "Eg skò byggje brui så håg og så ny og setje derunde stolpar av bly."
12. "Eg sko byggje brui så sterk og så håg og setje derunde stolpar av stål."
13. "Og alle mine sveinar skò ride i rad — eg vaktar deg nok for det kalde bad."
14. "Å, du må byggje om du vil, unde sky: det kan ingjen ifrå si folloga fly!
15. Du må byggje av bly, du må byggje av stål: det kan ingjen si folloga fly ifrå!"

16. Villemann let si ferd i rekkje, fir' og tjuge fyre og fir' og tjuge etter.
17. Då dei kom midtepå håge bru, då snåva hennar gangar i raude gullsko.
18. Gangaren snåva i raude gullsaum, og jomfruva raut åt stride straum.
19. Stolt Magnill slo opp med kvite hand: "Å Villemann, Villemann! hjelp meg i land!"
20. Villemann tala til smådrengjen sin: "Du hentar meg horpa i raude gullskrin!"
21. Fram kom horpa så vent ho let alt sat Villemann, sårt han gret.
22. Villemann gjeng'e for straumen å stå, meistarleg kunne han gullhorpa slå.
23. Han leika med lenpe, han leika med list: fuglen dåna på ville kvist.
24. Han leika med lempe han leika med gny: det gjallar i berg, og det rungar i sky.
25. Villemann leika så lang ein leik: då rivna borkjen av or og eik.
26. Han leika av topp, han leika av tre, han leika honni av kvike fe.
27. Han leika med vreide og leika med harm, han leika Magnill av nykkjens arm.
28. "Der hev du den eine, der hev du dei tvo, lat meg no hava mitt vatn i ro."
29. "Velkomi den fysste, velkomne dei tvo! men alli skò du hava ditt vatn i ro! "
30. Villemann leika og horpa skein, nykkjen han sprakk i hardan stein.
31. Dei fysste ordi som Magnill tala: "Sæl er den mo'er slik son må hava!"
32. "Sæl er den mo'er slik son'e å, endå sælar den honom må få!"
— Så liflig leika Villemann for si skjønn jomfru

=== Norwegian burdens ===
The Liestøl/Moe text "Villeman og Magnill" features only the one burden "Så liflig leika Villemann for si skjønn jomfru" ("So delightfully Villemann played for his virgin so fair"), which is echoed by e.g. the Hans Ross versions. Other variants have a single burden though worded differently.

However, Espland likes to class "Villemann og Magnhild" as a type that features "interior refrain" and a "final burden" (in italics below):

Villemann og hass møy så prud,
hei fagraste lindelauvi alle,
dei leika gulltavel i hennar bur.
Ved de rone det lyst å vinne.

Villemann and his maid so fair,
Hey, all the leaves of the sweet linden tree,
They played at draughts in her bower there.
With the wiles ["rune"] that the winning beguiled.

—Espeland tr.

The "interior refrain" and "burden" are repeated in the second and last lines of each quatrain stanza, a common formula found in other ballads. They precisely match the refrains performed by Høye Strand (1891-1972), recorded by Rolf Myklebust. Strand had learned from the ballad-singing tradition of singers who once performed for Jørgen Moe and Sophus Bugge. Here the de rone or rune is construed as "the spell", or "the wiles". Earlier transcribers heard these words as "dragonerne" (meaning "dragoon" or "firearm-bearing type of soldier"), (Note: "dragonerne" in Myklebust's 1938 ms. and in O. M. Sandvik's 1938 manuscript (NB Mus ms a 2124:1053; BIN: 3783)) and the contention has been made that this may have been the transmitted form, nonsensical as it appears to be. Still, the exact refrains including the use of "rune" are attested elsewhere in much earlier documents, e.g. Bugge's ms. of 1867 and others.

=== Norwegian variations ===
The scene of tavl (board game) being played by the two is not present in all versions. Instead, the playing of the gullharp by the hero occurs in the version performed by Strand and recorded by Myklebust. (Note: Other variants just mention "playing", or nothing corresponding at all.)

In some variants, the gull element is seen in the hero's altered name: Gullmund, Guldmund, Gudmund, etc. The hero could be called Gaute also (which is close to the name of the hero in the Icelandic version). And Villemann may be seen under slightly different spellings: Villemand, Vellemand, Vilemann, even Wallemann.

The name "Vendel's river" ("Vendels å") occurs in Liestøl and Moe's version as well as the Grundtvig text, but may be replaced by other river names such as "Vendings" in variants. (Note: "Vendelins å" occurs in several variants also; and "Vandals å" in,) The "Blide bridge" that ironically means "Blithe Bridge" features in Danish versions as well. (Note: The irony is pointed out with respect to the Danish version, in Graves and Thomsen (2004): "a stream ironically named 'Blide' [the Gentle One] in which a troll lives - must be crossed via 'Blide-Bro' [Gentle Bridge] by the unnamed female protagonist on her way.")

== Icelandic ==
The analogue in Iceland is known as Gautakvæði "Gauti's ballad", for which Grundtvig and Sigurðsson printed a critical text based on variants A–D (Íslenzk fornkvæði no. 3).

In the Icelandic version, the main characters are Gauti, a fine knight, and his wife Magnhild, wearing much gold jewelry and clad in black dress. (Note: According to the Cleasby-Vigfusson dictionary, "BRÚNN, adj." is literally "brown", but "brún klæði, black dress, of the dress of a divine".) While they lie in bed together, he asks her, "What grieves thee, my sweetheart?" and she answers it is because she will inevitably will be drowned in Skotberg River. He assures her she will not be drowned because he will build an iron bridge over the river. She replies "Though thou make it as high as a cloud, none can flee one's fate (tr. Kemp in his summary)" (str. 1–4). After three days of drunken revelry, they ride out to the Skotberg's river (str. 6), (Note: Variant D here inserts three stanzas, where Gauti orders his swain to saddle his pale (blakkr) and brown horse so they can ride to the priest's house.) and Gauti asks his swain (youth) about what has happened to Magnild, and receives report that just as she reached the midpoint, the iron bridge broke into pieces. 50 men fell in, and no one was paying attention about Magnhild (str. 10). He tells his swain to fetch his harp, and hurls the harp against the floor, breaking twelve strings, and then five more (str. 13). (Note: The harp-hurling and string-breaking stanzas are found in other ballads, e.g. Vallara kvæði (Íslenzk fornkvæði no. 15)) He strums the first tune, and a star is shot into the murky sea. His playing coaxes a bolt out of its lock, a cow from its shed, horse from its stall, a fair hind from the mountain, a ship from the rollers for launching it (hlunnr), a fair maiden from the greenfield, and finally, wrenches his wife Magnhild onto the white sand upon land (str. 18). (Note: Vesteinn Ólason gives "he draws a star into the sea, a bolt from a lock, a cow from its stall, hind from the hillside and, finally, Magnhild from the deep." In stjarnan fauk (str. 14),fauk is preterite of verb FJÚKA "to be driven on, tossed by the wind, of snow, dust, spray, or the like"; kú af bási (str. 15), bási is dative of BÁSS "a boose or stall in a cowhouse" (Cleasby-Vigfusson)) She is dead, and with much pain he kisses her, buries her flesh in consecrated ground, and takes strands of her gleaming hair to make into harp strings (str. 19–21). Variant B has an alternate ending, where he kisses her corpse and his heart bursts. In variant D, he kisses her and his heart shatters into three pieces, and three bodies went inside the stone-coffin together: Gauti and his wife and his mother who died of grief. (Note: Hallmundsson states "According to other versions of the ballad, Gauti's heart burst when he kissed his wife, and the two were buried in the same grave." and Vesteinn Ólason "But he has to endure the pain of kissing her dead lips. Thus ends B; DE add that his heart broke and describe the funeral." However, in Grundtvig ed., Íslensk fornkvæði the D variant's conclusion state þrjú fóru lík í steinþró saman (three bodies went inside the stone-coffin together), and hans hjartað brast in the B variant also.)

The name of the river in the ballad, "Skotberg River" (Skotbergs á), cannot be identified in Iceland's landscape but bears similarity to Skodborg River bordering North and South Jutland in Denmark, though none of the Danish ballad cognates give that river's name.

== English Translations ==
English translations of this ballad have been published. Retellings include "Christin's Trouble" (prose) in Julia Goddard's anthology (1871)

=== From the Danish ===
- "The Power of the Harp" by R. C. Alexander Prior (1860)
- "The Power of the Harp" by George Borrow (1913, 1923).
- "The Power of the Harp" by Alexander Gray (1954).

=== From the Swedish ===
- tr. "The Power of the Harp" (1828), of Geijer and Afzelius, #91.3
- Kenealy, Edward Vaughan tr. "The Power of the Harp" (1864), of Geijer and Afzelius, #91.1
- Anonymous (attrib. Robinson, Thérèse Albertine L. aka Talvj (1836).
  - Reprinted in: Longfellow ed. Poets and Poetry of Europe (1847).
- "The Power of the Harp" in Lord Peter and Little Kerstin (2013) by Ian Cumpstey.

=== From the Norwegian ===
- "Villeman and Magnhild" (NMB) by Theodore Jorgenson (1950, 1954).

=== From the Icelandic ===
- "Gauti's ballad" (ÍF 3) summarized in prose by Hallmundsson (1962).
- "ÍF 3 Gauta kvæði", summary and commentary by Vésteinn Ólason (1982).

== Recordings ==
- Svea Jansson in 1958, on the record Den medeltida balladen, SR RELP 5003-5006 (in Swedish) .
- The group Folk och rackare, on the record Anno 1979 from 1979 (new melody) (in Swedish) .
- Berit Opheim Versto, Norske Ballader: 30 ballader – Om drap og elskov, skjemt og lengsel blant riddere, jomfruer, kjemper og dyr, Grappa 2009, HCD 7239, EAN 7033662072392 (in Norwegian).
- Høye Strand (of Seljord i Telemark), issued in album Haugebonden (Buen Kultu, 1992); originally recorded on tape by Rolf Myklebust.
  - Folkeviseautomat - Arkiv
- Trio Mediæval, "Villemann og Magnhild" in Folk Songs (ECM Records 2007) (in Norwegian).
- Rita Eriksen and Dolores Keane, "Villemann og Magnhild" in Tideland (Alula 1996) (in Norwegian).
- Eli Storbekken, Sinikka Langeland, Agnes Buen Garnås, "Villemann og Magnhild" (several versions) in Det Syng! (Ballader på vandring) (Grappa 1997) (in Norwegian).
- Golden Bough, as "The Power of the Harp" on Winding Road (1986).
- German Medieval Metal group In Extremo performed the Norwegian version of the ballad for their album Weckt die Toten!. Their version of the ballad was covered by French folk group SKÁLD for their EP Winter Songs.
- Myrkur, "Harpens Kraft" in Folkesange (Relapse Records 2020).
