= Karen Brahes Folio =

Karen Brahes Folio (Danish: Karen Brahes Foliohåndskrift) is a manuscript collection of Danish ballads dating from the late 16th century. The collection is named after the book collector Karen Brahe and is currently held by the Danish National Archives in Fyn (Odense, Landsarkivet for Fyn, Karen Brahe E I,1).

Literary historian Svend Grundtvig characterized the manuscript as "the richest, and in every way most significant, folk song manuscript that any country has to offer", while noting that it has a consistent tendency of embellishment of its traditional material.

== History ==
The manuscript contains the following names, presumed to be of its early owners: E Mett Lange, Knud Brahe 1583; Ellen Giøe, Otto Giøe, Torpegaard 17 September 1628. Around the time of its creation, or shortly after, it seems to have belonged to the noblewoman Margrethe Lange, who came from Engelsholm at Vejle. She is believed to have written the work herself in her own dialect in the late 16th century, which is consistent with the heavy influence in the texts of the Jutlandic dialect.

At the time she would have written the manuscript, Lange is believed to have been married to Jens Kaas of Gudumlund and therefore likely wrote it at his family's estate. After Kaas' death in 1578, she married Knud Brahe in 1584 in Horsens. Her second husband was part of the noble Brahe family, who would eventually inherit the collection after her death in 1622. It passed first to Ellen Gøye, before likely passing to Ellen's sister, Anne Gøye, in 1656. Anne Gøye had amassed a large collection of books which she bequeathed, perhaps along with the manuscript folio, to her grand-niece, Karen Brahe.

== Contents ==
With around two hundred ballads, the manuscript is one of the largest early collections of Danish folksongs and, by extent, Scandinavian folk-songs generally. It offers some of the earliest texts of ballads like Elveskud, Herr Bøsmer i elvehjem, and Harpens kraft.

== See also ==
- Danmarks gamle Folkeviser
- The Types of the Scandinavian Medieval Ballad
