= Herr Holger =

"Herr Holger" (Sir Holger) or "Rige herr Holgers hjemkomst" (Rich Sir Holger's Homecoming) is a Swedish and Danish folk ballad (SMB 36; DgF 322; TSB A 71) revolving around the execution of a corrupt tax collector.

The eponymous Sir Holger, a corrupt and greedy tax official, is discovered to have been pocketing money for himself. As a punishment, King Kristian has Holger beheaded. His horse carries his body home; in the Danish variant, Holger is tied to his horse with strips of his own skin; in the Swedish, his severed head is re-attached to his body. After his death, Holger is damned to hell for all eternity for his sins. One night, Holger appears as a ghoul to his widow, Lady Tala. In the Swedish variants, he warns her that unless she returns his ill-gotten gains to their rightful owners, she, too, may end up in hell. Despite this warning, Lady Tala refuses to do so, saying she would rather end up in hell than surrender her wealth. The Danish text ends with Holger's ghost urging his wife to go to Norway in order to escape the king, which she does.

The song was not documented until the late 1800s, when it was collected from oral tradition in Denmark (by Evald Tang Kristensen, 1874) and southern Sweden (by Axel Ramm, 1880s). Svend Grundtvig considered the song an "offshoot" of the ballad of Marsk Stig (DgF 145), otherwise known only from manuscripts.

The Swedish band Garmarna released a rendition of this song as a single in 1996.
