= The Gay Goshawk =

Traditional song

The Gay Goshawk (Roud 61, Child 96) is a traditional English-language folk ballad.

== Synopsis ==
A Scottish squire sends a letter to his love by a goshawk, who tells her that he has sent many letters and will die for love. She goes to ask her father a boon, and he says, anything but leave to marry the squire. She asks that, if she dies, she will be buried in Scotland. He agrees, and she takes a sleeping potion. When her body is carried to Scotland, the squire comes to lament her, opening the coffin or the winding sheet. She wakes—sometimes after he kisses her—tells him she has fasted nine days for him, and tells her brothers to go home without her.

== Variants ==
Heroines who feign death, to win their lovers or for other reasons of escape, are a common motif in ballads. The hero who feigns death to draw a timid maiden is less common, but still often appears as in "Willie's Lyke-Wake", Child ballad 25.

The bird as a messenger is common in ballads. Later forms of this ballad use not a goshawk but a parrot, a bird that can talk.
