= Lady Diamond =

Traditional song

Lady Diamond (Child 269, Roud 112) is an English-language folk song, existing in several variants. The story is derived from that of Ghismonda and Guiscardo from The Decameron of Giovanni Boccaccio.

== Synopsis ==
A great king has a daughter (Lady Diamond, Daisy, Dysmal, or Dysie), who falls in love with his kitchen boy. She becomes pregnant. Her father demands to know the boy, and she tells him. He has the kitchen boy secretly murdered, but then, in most variants, brings his heart to his daughter. She dies. In most variants, the king laments the deaths.

== Recordings ==
Steeleye Span recorded a version on their 1986 album Back in Line.

The 2011 debut album by Bryony Griffith & Will Hampson of The Demon Barbers is entitled Lady Diamond and features a recording of the ballad.

In 1939, Alan Lomax recorded Aunt Molly Jackson singing “Lady Nancy,” a song she claimed to have written after reading the story in a book of English and Scottish Kings. Such outlandish claims were common with Jackson, although this is quite possibly the only known American version of Lady Diamond to be collected. Where and how she learned it remains a mystery.

A corresponding Scandinavian ballad (TSB D 390) exists in Danish ("Hertug Frydenborg", DgF 305), Swedish ("Hertig Fröjdenborg och fröken Adelin", SMB 172), and (fragmentary) Norwegian ("Frydenborg og Adelin") variants.
