= I Know What I Have Learned =

Danish fairy tale

I know what I have learned is a Danish fairy tale, collected by Svend Grundtvig in Gamle Danske Minder i Folkemunde. Andrew Lang included it in The Pink Fairy Book.

== Synopsis ==
A man's three daughters were all married to trolls. One day he visited the youngest. Her husband knocked pieces from his head, so they could make broth, and gave him a sack of gold. He remembered he had a cow about to calf and left the gold to get back quicker, but a thief stole the gold, and the man stubbornly said that he had learned something.

He visited the second daughter, and instead of candles, her husband lit his fingers. He lost two bags of gold to a thief.

He visited the oldest daughter, and her husband went fishing out in a dough trough. He asked his wife whether his eyes were green yet, and when they were, he jumped in and fished. The father lost three bags of gold this time.

His wife was angry with him, but he tried to knock pieces from his head for broth and had to take his bed. Then he tried lighting his fingers for candles, and again had to take to bed. Finally, he tried to fish, asking his wife whether his eyes were green; she claimed they were, he jumped in, and she rowed off and left him.
