= Folk och Rackare =

Folk och rackare
- Also known as: Carin Kjellman & Ulf Gruvberg
- Origin: Gothenburg, Sweden
- Genres: Folk rock
- Years active: 1972–1986, 1996, 2017, 2025
- Past members: Carin Kjellman 1970–1986; Ulf Gruvberg 1970–1986; Jørn Jensen 1976–1986; Trond Villa 1976–1986; Affe Byberg 1985–1986; Olle Westbergh 1985–1986

Folk och Rackare are a Swedish-Norwegian folk rock band primarily active between 1972 and 1986. They are sometimes considered part of the diverse progg movement. At a time when Swedish folk music was dominated by instrumental spelmansmusik, Folk och Rackare stood out by incorporating vocal traditions, particularly medieval ballads, taking cues mainly from the British folk rock scene. Recent activity: Played Aarhus Alter Fest September 12th 2025.

== History ==
Carin Kjellman (born 1950) and Ulf Gruvberg (born 1946) formed the band in 1972 while studying musicology at the University of Gothenburg, having performed together for the first time at the 1970 Västervik folk music festival. In 1974, they released the album Med rötter i medeltiden ("With Roots in the Middle Ages", as Carin Kjellman & Ulf Gruvberg). Folk och Rackare (1976) featured guest musicians Kalle Almlöf, Jonny Soling, and Jørn Jensen. Jensen and Trond Villa, both members of Norwegian band Folque, soon became full-time members, establishing what would become the core of the group. This international mix of members was regarded as somewhat sensational at the time.

The music of Folk och Rackare drew heavily on that of British folk rock bands such as Fairport Convention and Pentangle. When Carin Kjellman realized that the kind of material these bands played also existed in Sweden, she started searching through archival collections for songs. This was initially met with a degree of skepticism in some quarters, who were concerned that the traditional material would be distorted or commercialized. The band almost exclusively performed traditional songs, but often would treat the material in novel ways, such as by combining different sources, or the addition of original melodies. Toward the end of the 1970s, the band enjoyed a degree of international success, performing at folk music festivals throughout Europe.

The album Stjärnhästen ("The Star Horse", 1981) consisted of traditional Christmas and Saint Stephen's Day songs (such as Swedish variants of "Saint Stephen and Herod"). On Rackbag (1985), the group was joined by three new members, Affe (Alf) Byberg (drums), Olle Westbergh (keyboards), and Micke Jahn (electric guitar), and guest musician Richard Thompson. The addition of new members caused a degree of tension within the group, as well as increased costs that made concert arrangers hesitant to book the band, and they ended up parting ways.

== Legacy ==
Shortly after the band's breakup, Kjellman recorded a solo album for Amalthea, toning down the folk influences for more of a rock sound. Kjellman, Jensen, and Gruvberg all became involved with radio. Gruvberg produced Hedningarna's breakthrough album Kaksi!.

In 1996, the band reunited for a string of performances at Danish and Swedish festivals, and again in 2017 to perform at Norrbostämman. Further performances were planned for 2020 but had to be postponed due to the pandemic. In April 2022 the tour finally went ahead.

Folk och Rackare has remained a significant influence on contemporary Swedish folk music, inspiring bands such as Garmarna and Ranarim, and folk singer and musician Lena Willemark.

== Discography ==
- Med rötter i medeltiden (1974), as Carin Kjellman & Ulf Gruvberg
- Folk och rackare (1976)
- Rackarspel (1978)
- Anno 1979 (1979)
- Stjärnhästen (1981)
- Rackbag (1985)
- 1976–1985 (1996), compilation
