= Hind Etin =

Traditional song

"Hind Etin" (Roud 33, Child 41) is a folk ballad existing in several variants.

== Synopsis ==
Lady Margaret goes to the woods, and her breaking a branch is questioned by Hind Etin, who takes her with him into the forest. She bears him seven sons, but laments that they are never christened, nor she herself churched. One day, her oldest son goes hunting with Hind Etin and asks him why his mother always weeps. Hind Etin tells him, and then one day goes hunting without him. The oldest son takes his mother and brothers and brings them out of the woods. In some variants, they are welcomed back; in all, the children are christened, and their mother, churched.

== Motifs ==
The meeting in the woods is often similar, when not identical, to Tam Lin's meeting with Fair Janet.

In some variants, the mother's grief expresses itself as hostility to the children, wishing they were rats and she a cat, as in "Fair Annie"; her comments inspire a child's suggestion that they try to leave, which is accomplished easily, with no reason why they could not have fled before.

The etin of the Scottish version is, in Scandinavian and German versions, an elf-king, a hill-king, a dwarf-king, or even a merman. Only in the Danish is the ballad found before the nineteenth century; a sixteenth-century Danish form, "Jomfruen og Dværgekongen" (DgF 37, TSB A 54). In some versions, she is lured or forced back to her husband; this may end tragically, with her death from sorrow. The German variant, "Agnes and the Mermaid", has the husband say they must divide the children, and since they have an odd number, they must split one in two.

== See also ==
- Gil Brenton
- The Sprig of Rosemary
- List of the Child Ballads
