= Clerk Colvill =

Child ballad

"Clerk Colvill" or "Clerk Colven" (Roud 147, Child 42) otherwise known as "The Mermaid", is a traditional English-language folk ballad. This ballad was one of 25 traditional works included in Ballads Weird and Wonderful (1912), where it was illustrated by Vernon Hill.

== Synopsis ==
Clerk Colvill, ignoring the advice of his lady or his mother, goes to a body of water, where a mermaid seduces him. His head starts to ache, and the mermaid tells him he will die of it. He goes home and dies.

In some variants, she offers that he may go to sea with her instead of dying, at the end, and he refuses.

== Motifs ==
Francis James Child regarded the ballad as incomplete, and that Clerk Colvill is not an innocent victim of jealousy, but has clearly had a relationship with the mermaid, so that she inflicts death as the penalty for his infidelity, a motif found in many German and Scandinavian tales.

The detail of the mermaid washing a sark or silk garment may descend from Scandinavian originals of an elf-woman offering a shirt to the man she is enamored with as a sign of betrothal (see §Similar ballads below).

== Similar ballads ==
Similar ballads exist in the Nordic countries. The ballad is called "Elveskud" (DgF 47) in Danish, "Olav Liljekrans" (NMB 36) in Norwegian, "Herr Olof och älvorna" (SMB 29) in Swedish, "Ólavur Riddararós og álvamoy" (CCF 154) in Faroese and "Kvæði af Ólafi liljurós" (IFkv 1) in Icelandic. In these ballads the role of the mermaid is taken by an elf woman.

Also, the "Johnny Collins" version of the Child ballad "Lady Alice" (No. 85) is in fact identifiable with "Clerk Colvill" which tells the same story. (Note: Proposed by Samuel P. Bayard (1945), though the similarity was already pointed out by Barbara M. Cra'ster in 1910.)

A maiden "washing marble-white stone" in "Johnny Collins" seems nonsensical, but the mermaid is "washing silk upon a stane" in "Clerk Colvill" which makes all the sense, and the close similarity of these details is offered as compelling evidence for equating the two ballads. This mermaid-laundered clothing is paralleled in the Faroese version by the clean shirt. A piece of garment offered as gift is a form or seduction, or more precisely an invitation to become betrothed, and this is in Scottish tradition preserved in ballads, as well as being attested in the Scandinavian ballad Elveskud (DgF 47), where Sir Olav (Olaf) is offered a shirt in such a manner.
