= Herr Tønne af Alsø =

Danish ballad

Herr Tønne af Alsø ('Sir Tønne of Alsø') is a Danish ballad (The Types of the Scandinavian Medieval Ballad A 62; Danmarks gamle Folkeviser 34). Danmarks gamle Folkeviser records two versions: A (73 stanzas) and B (38); it also appears in Norway and Sweden. Dokumentasjonsprosjektet in Norway notes eight different variants, one dating back to the 1840s.

== Summary ==
In the summary of The Types of the Scandinavian Medieval Ballad,

While out hunting Sir Tønne meets the daughter of a mountain gnome. She plays runic love spells for him on her golden harp and he is enchanted. But her mother, who is a human being, comes and breaks the spell. She tells Tønne to rescue her niece ... who is kept a prisoner by a king at Uppsala ... Tønne goes there, defeats the king's men and frees the maid.

In the Swedish texts, the king is in Iceland rather than Uppsala, and in some of these Tønne rescues the sister, not the niece, of the mountain gnome's daughter.
