= Fause Foodrage =

Traditional song

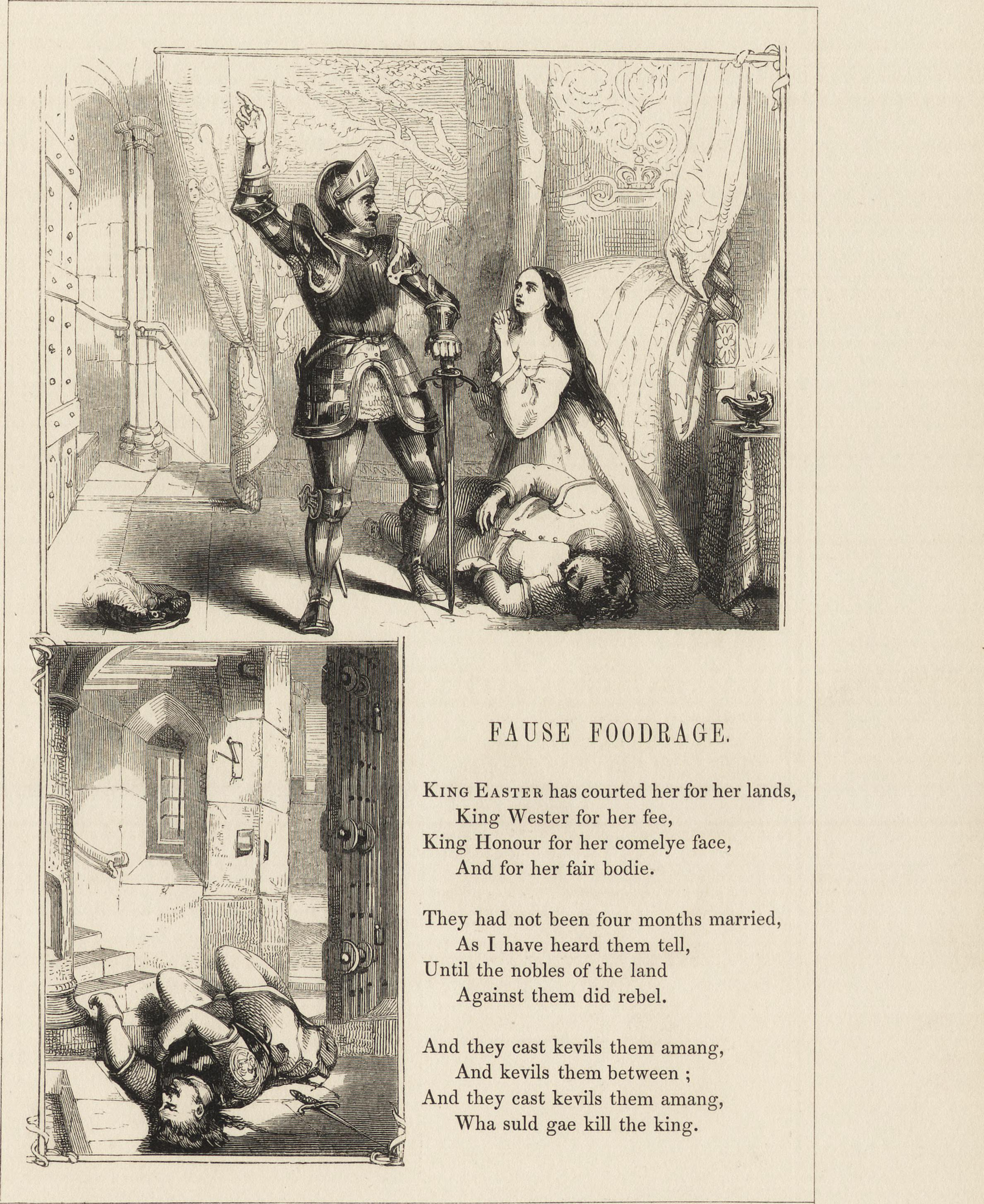
Fause Foodrage from The Book of British ballads (1842)

Fause Foodrage (Child ballad 89, Roud 57) is a Scottish murder ballad of the 17th or 18th century. It was first printed by Walter Scott in Minstrelsy of the Scottish Border (1802). Scott cited Elizabeth, Lady Wardlaw as the ballad's probable author.

== Synopsis ==
Three kings, King Easter (or King of Eastmure), King Wester (or King of Westmure) and King Honor (or King o Luve), are courting a woman; she marries King Honor for love, but there is a rebellion of nobles, and the lot falls on "False Foodrage" (Fause Foodrage, Fa'se Footrage) to kill the king, or, in other variants, the Eastmure king kills King Honor because his suit for King Honor's queen was rejected. The queen pleads for her life until her child is born.

Fause Foodrage tells her that if the baby is a boy, he will die. He sets guards on her, but she gets them drunk and leaves out a window. She has a son in a pigsty. Wise William is sent to seek her; he sends his wife, and when she finds her, she persuades her to change her son for her daughter, saying that they will both raise the other's child fittingly. When the boy is grown, Wise William takes him by the royal castle and tells him the truth. The son kills Fause Foodrage, rewards Wise William, and marries the daughter that his mother raised.

Walter Scott commented that King Easter and King Wester represent "petty princes of Northumberland and Westmoreland" but later retracted this opinion.

== Variants ==
Child ballad 90 Jellon Grame has affinities to this ballad.

This ballad is closely related with a Scandinavian one, "Young William" (TSB E 96), in which a rival in love kills the successful wooer, the woman bears a child and has the rival told it was a girl, and the son, grown, kills the rival. Another Scandinavian ballad (TSB D 352) opens with the bride being carried off, and her family coming to burn down the church that the bridegroom and his people are in; she hides her son from her family and in time he avenges his father.

== Modern interpretations ==
The tune recorded with Fause Foodrage was used for the ballad Willie o Winsbury by mistake by Andy Irvine of Sweeney's Men (1968) and has since frequently been used for that song. An arrangement of this tune is used in The Wicker Man (1973) for the "procession" scene.

In contrast to Willie o Winsbury, the ballad Fause Foodrage has only rarely been recorded by modern folk musicians. One recording is that by Hermes Nye (1957).
