= Elvehøj =

Scandinavian song

Elvehøj (Elf Hill) is the Danish name of a Scandinavian ballad (Danmarks gamle folkeviser no. 46), known in Swedish as Älvefärd (Sveriges medeltida ballader no. 31), type A 65 ('knight released from elves at dawn') in The Types of the Scandinavian Medieval Ballad; it is also attested in Norwegian.

== Summary ==
The ballad is in the first person. The narrator, an attractive young man, falls asleep beside an elf-mound (or elvehøj). Some women (usually elf-maidens) then attempt to woo the narrator, singing so beautifully that the natural world responds (the streams stop flowing, fish dance for joy, etc., depending on the variant). The narrator, however, resists their blandishments, grasping his sword (usually in silence). The man is most often rescued by the crowing of a cock awaking him, though in the Danish A-version, from the mid-sixteenth-century Jens Billes visebog (known to Grundtvig as 'Sten Bille’s Haandskrift'), he is saved by the advice of his sister who, previously enchanted, is one of the elf-maidens. The ballad usually ends with moralising advice to the listeners.

The following table, by Lynda Taylor, charts the differences between the main versions.

Narrative elements	Sw A	Sw C	Dan A	Dan B	Dan C
Frame: young man introduces himself.	×	×	×		×
Young man, resting head on elf-hill, approached by elf-maidens.	×	trolls	×	×	×
They waken him and invite him to dance.	×		×	×	×
One elf sits on a golden chair.			×		
She sings the most beautiful song, enchanting all around her:	×	×	×	×	×
> affecting the stream and the fish, the birds	×		×	×	×
> the wild animals	×		×		
They invite him to stay with them, offering inducements.		×		×	×
He sits by while the dancing continues, refusing to interact.	×		×	×	×
The elves threaten to kill him if he does not stay with them.				×	×
A maiden brings him a drink, advising him not to partake. He obeys, offering to rescue her from the elves. She tells him that is impossible.			×		
He says God has come to his help by sending the dawn to waken the cockerel; otherwise he would have ended up in the mountain with the elves.	luck	×	×	×	×
Advice to young men not to linger by an elf-hill.			×	×	×

== Manuscripts ==
DgF includes three main variants of ‘'Elvehøj'’, one of which survives in several near-identical copies. There are three versions in Sveriges medeltida ballader: two (A and C) are complete, with eight four-line stanzas each, while the B-version is fragmentary, with only four stanzas. Each one is very different from the others. A is the oldest Swedish version, collected in the 1670s from a farmer’s wife in Västergötland; C was collected in Östergötland in the 1840s.

Country	Edition	Siglum	Manuscript	Date
Denmark	DgF 46	A	Jens Billes visebog	mid-C16
Denmark	DgF 46	Ba	Langebeks Foliohaandskrift Nr. 61	1610
Denmark	DgF 46	Bb	Reenbergs Haandskrift Nr. 132	c. 1700
Denmark	DgF 46	Bc	Thotts Foliohaandskrift Nr. 132	c. 1750
Denmark	DgF 46	Bd	Vedel II Nr. 9	1591
Denmark	DgF 46	Be	Queen Sofie’s Visebog Nr. 16	1584–98
Denmark	DgF 46	C	Collected by Evald Tang Kristensen	1868×77
Sweden	SMB 31	A	Collected from a farmer’s wife in Västergötland	1670s
Sweden	SMB 31	B	Fragmentary	
Sweden	SMB 31	C	Collected in Östergötland	1840s

== Translations ==
- German by Herder (1774) (this translation translated into English by Lewis (1801))
- Scots by Robert Jamieson, 'Elfer Hill', in Popular Ballads and Songs from Tradition, Manuscripts, and Scarce Editions; with Translations of Similar Pieces from the Ancient Danish Language and a Few Originals by the Editor, Volume I (Edinburgh: Constable, 1806), pp. 225-28.

== Analogues and influence ==
The ballad can be seen as a 'happy ending' version of the much more famous Elveskud. The story is also similar to the ballads Herr Magnus och havsfrun, SMB 26, and Jungfrurnas gäst, SMB 30.

H. C. Andersen wrote a fairy tale called 'Elverhøi' in 1845, 'and the celebrated elfin mound has now become a tourist spot in Stevns Peninsula, Denmark.

The ballad was one of the inspirations for the 1828 patriotic play Elverhøj (Elves' Hill) by Johan Ludvig Heiberg. Elverhøj is still a popular play in Denmark.

=== In popular culture ===
- Norwegian singer Helene Bøksle used part of the text of the ballad as lyrics for her song Elverhøy.
- French neofolk band SKÁLD used part of the text of the ballad as lyrics for their single Elverhøy, from their 2023 album Huldufólk.

== See also ==
- Siren
