= Fair Annie =

Traditional song

Fair Annie (Roud 42, Child 62) is a traditional folk ballad, existing in several variants.

== Synopsis ==
A lord tells Fair Annie to prepare a welcome for his bride, and to look like a maiden. Annie laments that she has borne him seven sons and is pregnant with the eighth; she cannot look like a maiden. She welcomes the bride but laments her fate, even wishing her sons evil, that they might be rats and she a cat. The bride comes to ask her why she grieves, and then asks her what her family was before the lord stole her. Then she reveals that she is Annie's full sister and will give her her dowry, so that Annie can marry the lord instead of her; she is a maiden still and so can return home.

== Variants ==
Several Scandinavian variants exist: the Swedish "Skön Anna" and the Danish "Skjön Anna" (DgF 258). In them, the hero is a man who has newly become king, after the death of his father; his long-term mistress, Anna or Anneck, tries to get him to make her his wife, and the queen mother supports her. When the son refuses and chooses a bride, Anneck wishes to speak with her; the queen mother brings her to the other woman, and her account makes the bride make the realization.

An earlier echo of this motif is Marie de France's lai, Le Fresne. In this twelfth-century tale, the heroine is not kidnapped but abandoned with birth tokens. Le Fresne has a twin, which was regarded as proof of adultery, and a servant abandons her to save her life. Le Fresne eventually becomes the childless concubine of a lord, whose vassals force him to take a legitimate wife to produce heirs. The bride in Le Fresne is, in fact, the other twin.

== Motifs ==
In some variants of Hind Etin, the captive mother expresses her grief in hostility to her children in the same language as this ballad.

== See also ==
- Lord Thomas and Fair Annet
