= Corpus Carminum Færoensium =

Catalog of folk songs

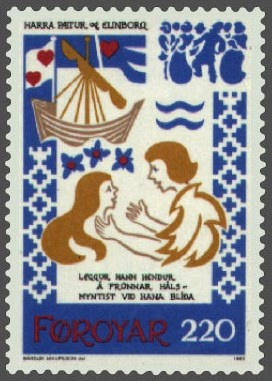
"Harra Pætur og Elinborg" (CCF 158)

Føroya kvæði: Corpus Carminum Færoensium (CCF) is a scholarly edition collecting traditional Faroese ballads, or kvæði.

The songs were collected by Svend Grundtvig and Jørgen Bloch, and published by Napoleon Djurhuus and Christian Matras between 1941 and 1972. The edition consists of six volumes covering 236 ballad types. The later classification in The Types of the Scandinavian Medieval Ballad excludes around 60 of these, citing most frequently that they are known to be of more recent origin, they do not meet the criteria used to define ballad, or their author is known by name.

== Bibliographic details ==
Føroya kvæði = Corpus carminum Færoensium, ed. by Sv. Grundtvig and others, Universitets-jubilæets danske samfunds skriftserie, 324, 332, 339, 341, 344, 347, 357, 368, 406, 420, 427, 438, 540, 559, 8 vols (Munksgaard: Copenhagen, 1941–2003).
