= Willie's Lyke-Wake =

Traditional song

Song
- Genre: Folk

"Willie's Lyke-Wake" (Roud 30, Child 25) is an English-language folk song.

== Synopsis ==
Willie sets up his wake and lies in his winding cloth. His love discovers this and pleads with her father to let her go. When he does, and she enters the room, Willie rouses himself and declares that he will marry her at once.

== Variants ==
The hero who feigns death to draw a timid maiden is a common ballad theme; even more common is for a heroine to use it to gain a husband, as in "The Gay Goshawk".

Danish variants occur in manuscript in the sixteenth century, and continued in oral tradition for centuries. It is among the commonest ballads in Danish, and is known in Magyar, Slovenian, and Italian variants.

== See also ==
- List of Child Ballads
