= Fair Janet =

Traditional song

Fair Janet (Roud 44, Child 64) is an English-language folk ballad.

== Synopsis ==
Janet is in love with Willie, but her father insists on her marrying a French lord. They attempt to flee, but she goes into labor and can not escape. She hands their baby to Willie, for his care, and he delivers the baby to his mother and goes to the wedding. Janet is ill and dies during the dancing. In many variants, the bridegroom swears that no church bells will ring for her, and Willie that they all will. In most, Willie dies within a day, and those where he does not, the story cuts off.

== Variants ==
Scandinavian and German ballads show many parallels with this one, although none decisive enough to point to a common origin.
