= Child Waters =

Traditional song

Child Waters (Roud 43, Child 63) is an English-language folk song, existing in several variants.

== Synopsis ==
The pregnant Margaret, or Faire Ellen (Burd Ellen), is told by Child Waters (or Lord John) that she should bide at home. In some variants, he offers her lands to support his child, and she tells him that she would rather have one kiss from him than all his lands. He tells her that she must dress as his footpage and will suffer — in some variants, even worse conditions than his horse and hound. She still goes with him. After they arrive at home, she gives birth. Child Waters gives her the best bed in his castle to lie in and promises that they will marry on the same day that she is churched.

== Motifs ==
A common scene, where she must pass through water, shows parallels to the ballads "Lizzie Lindsay" and "The Knight and Shepherd's Daughter".

== See also ==
- Young Hunting
