= The Broomfield Hill =

Traditional song

"The Broomfield Hill", "The Broomfield Wager" "The Merry Broomfield", "The Green Broomfield", "A Wager, a Wager", or "The West Country Wager" (Child 43, Roud 34) is a traditional English folk ballad. (The Roud Index lists a number of other titles.)

== Synopsis ==
In most versions a gentleman, in some versions called Lord John, challenges a maiden to a wager, usually at very high odds:

"A wager, a wager with you, pretty maid,
My one hundred pound to your ten"
That a maid you shall go into yonder green broom
But a maid you shall never return"

or she makes a tryst and realizes she can either stay and be foresworn, or go and lose her virginity. After, in some versions advice from a witch-wife, or after persuading him to drink "a glass of something so strong" in one version, she goes to the broom field and finds him in a deep sleep. She leaves tokens to show she has been there, and in many versions carries out what seems to be a ritual:

"Then three times she went from the crown of his head
And three times from the soles of his feet,
And three times she kissed his red ruby lips
As he lay fast in a sleep."

then, after leaving tokens to show she had been there, either leaves quickly or hides in the bushes to watch what happens.

He wakes and in some variants taxes those with him — his goshawk, his servingmen, his horse, or his hound — that they did not wake him, but they answer it was impossible. He is angry that he did not manage to take her virginity and, in many variants, murder her afterwards, though in others he says he would have murdered her if she had resisted his intentions:

"Had I been awake when my true love was here
Of her I would have had my will
If not, the pretty birds in this merry green broom
Of her blood they should all had her fill."

In some variants, she hears this and leaves glad:

"Be cheerful, be cheerful, and do not repine.
For now 'tis as clear as the sun.
The money, the money, the money is mine,
And the wager I fairly have won".

== Versions ==
=== Early published versions ===
The Broomfield Hill was printed by a number of publishers of broadside ballads. There are seven in the Bodleian Broadside collection, all fairly similar, with an earliest possible date of 1711. Child included six versions, five of them Scottish and one from an English broadside from the collection compiled by Francis Douce.

=== Versions collected from traditional singers ===
47 of the 61 examples listed in the Roud Folk Song Index were collected from singers in England, mostly in the south, with 13 from Somerset and 7 from Sussex. Cecil Sharp collected 14 versions from English singers. 7 versions were collected from Scotland and just one from County Antrim, Ireland. Only six were collected from the United States.

== Recordings ==
=== Recordings by traditional singers ===
Field recordings by a number of traditional singers have been published. These include Suffolk singer Cyril Poacher (under the title "Green Broom"); Gordon Hall from Sussex; Pop Maynard of Sussex, (A Wager, a Wager); Dorset gypsy singer Carolyne Hughes (A Wager, a Wager); and Norfolk singer Walter Pardon.

== Motifs ==
The woman who enchants a man to sleep and so preserves her virginity is a common folktale and ballad motif throughout Europe.

== See also ==
- List of the Child Ballads
