= Brown Robyn's Confession =

Traditional song

"Brown Robyn's Confession" (Roud 3882, Child 57) is an English-language folk song.

== Synopsis ==
Brown Robyn goes to sea. Onboard ship, they are unable to see any lights in the sky. They "cast kevels" (drew lots) which indicated that the problem was because of Brown Robyn. He confesses to incestuous relations with his mother (who bore him two children) and his sister (who bore five), or, in other variants, to killing his father. He tells them to tie him to a piece of wood and let him sink or swim.

He swims. Our Blessed Lady, with her "dear young son", appears to him and asks him if he would return to his men or come to heaven with her and her child. He asks to go to heaven. She tells him that it is not for any good he has done but for confessing his sin that he may come.

== Motifs ==
This is the only instance in the ballad collection of a very common folk legend, of the Virgin Mary. This is also found in Norway, Denmark, and Sweden, but the ballad usually ends tragically for the hero; only one instance saves him, also by a supernatural intervention.

The motif of the lots and throwing a person from the ship may be derived from the tale of Jonah. Another ballad featuring these motifs is Bonnie Annie, Child ballad 24. It also appears in the Russian fairy tale Sadko, where Sadko must jump overboard to appease the King of the Sea.

== See also ==
- List of the Child Ballads
