= Saint Stephen and Herod =

Traditional song

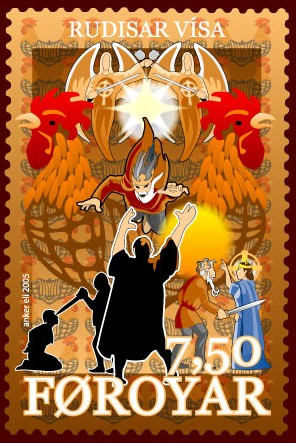
A Faroese stamp commemorating the Faroese ballad "Rudisar vísa", on the same story

"St. Stephen and Herod" (Roud 3963, Child 22) is a traditional English Christmas carol. It depicts the martyrdom of Saint Stephen as occurring, with wild anachronism, under Herod the Great, and claims that that was the reason for St. Stephen's Day being the day after Christmas.

== Synopsis ==
St. Stephen served Herod as a clerk. He saw the Star of Bethlehem and went to Herod to leave his service. Herod asks him what he lacks, and he affirms that no one lacks anything in his hall, but the child born in Bethlehem is better than that. Herod says it is as true as that the cock cooked for his supper would crow again. Immediately it does, and Herod had Stephen stoned to death.

== Variants ==
This story, with the Wise Men as the heroes, appears in Child ballad 55, "The Carnal and the Crane".

The miraculous restoration of a rooster to life is a common motif in European ballads; it frequently appears in a tale in which an innocent person condemned to death is miraculously saved from death, and in which someone expresses disbelief in that miracle as it was unlikely as the rooster's resurrection.

== See also ==
- List of Child Ballads
