= Svend Grundtvig =

Danish literary historian and ethnographer (1824–1883)

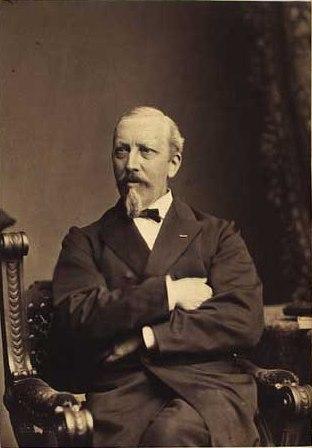
Svend Grundtvig (date unknown)

Svend Hersleb Grundtvig (9 September 1824 – 14 July 1883) was a Danish literary historian and ethnographer. He was one of the first systematic collectors of Danish traditional music, and he was especially interested in Danish folk songs. He began the large project of editing Danish ballads. He also co-edited Icelandic ballads. He was the son of N. F. S. Grundtvig.

== Biography ==
Grundtvig was born in Copenhagen. His father arranged his education, employing a series of home tutors to teach him Icelandic, Latin, Danish and Anglo-Saxon while personally instructing him in Nordic mythology, Saxo Grammaticus and folkloric ballads. When he was 14, his father bought him a 1656 manuscript of an old ballad, triggering his interest in further exploring the history of Danish folk music which was to be his life's work.

When 19, after his father accompanied him on a study tour to England, Grundtvig published Danish translations of English and Scottish ballads before devoting his life to the collection and study of Danish folk tales and ballads. In a manifesto in 1844, he encouraged Danish men and women to record national ballads still in popular usage. He was the first editor of the multi-volume Danmarks gamle Folkeviser, whose mantle was taken up by other editors. Gruntvig also encouraged the Faroese V. U. Hammershaimb to gather ballads of his native land; Hammershaimb after making several publications eventually turned over the collection to Grundtvig, who with Jørgen Bloch co-edited the Føroya kvæði: Corpus Carminum Færoensium (1876).

In 1854, he extended this call to all types of folklore, building up a nationwide network of collaborators, soon resulting in his three-volume work Danske Minder (1854–61). In 1876, he published Danske folkeæventyr, the first of three volumes of Danish folk tales. He died in Frederiksberg.

== Own works ==
Grundtvig's published works, all in Danish, include:

- Engelske og skotske folkeviser, 1842–1846
- Gamle danske minder i Folkemunde, 1854–61
  - I Know What I Have Learned
- Danske Kæmpeviser, 1867
- Danske Folkeæventyr, 1876–83
- Danmarks Folkeviser i Udvalg, 1882

== Literature ==
- Grundtvig, Sven, Jesse Grant Cramer (translator): Danish Fairy Tales. Boston: The Four Seas Company, 1912, 118 p.
- Grundtvig, Sven, Gustav Hein (translator): Danish Fairy Tales. New York, Thomas Y. Crowell Company, 1914, 219 p.
