= The Types of the Scandinavian Medieval Ballad =

Scandinavian ballad cataloguing system

The Types of the Scandinavian Medieval Ballad: A Descriptive Catalogue
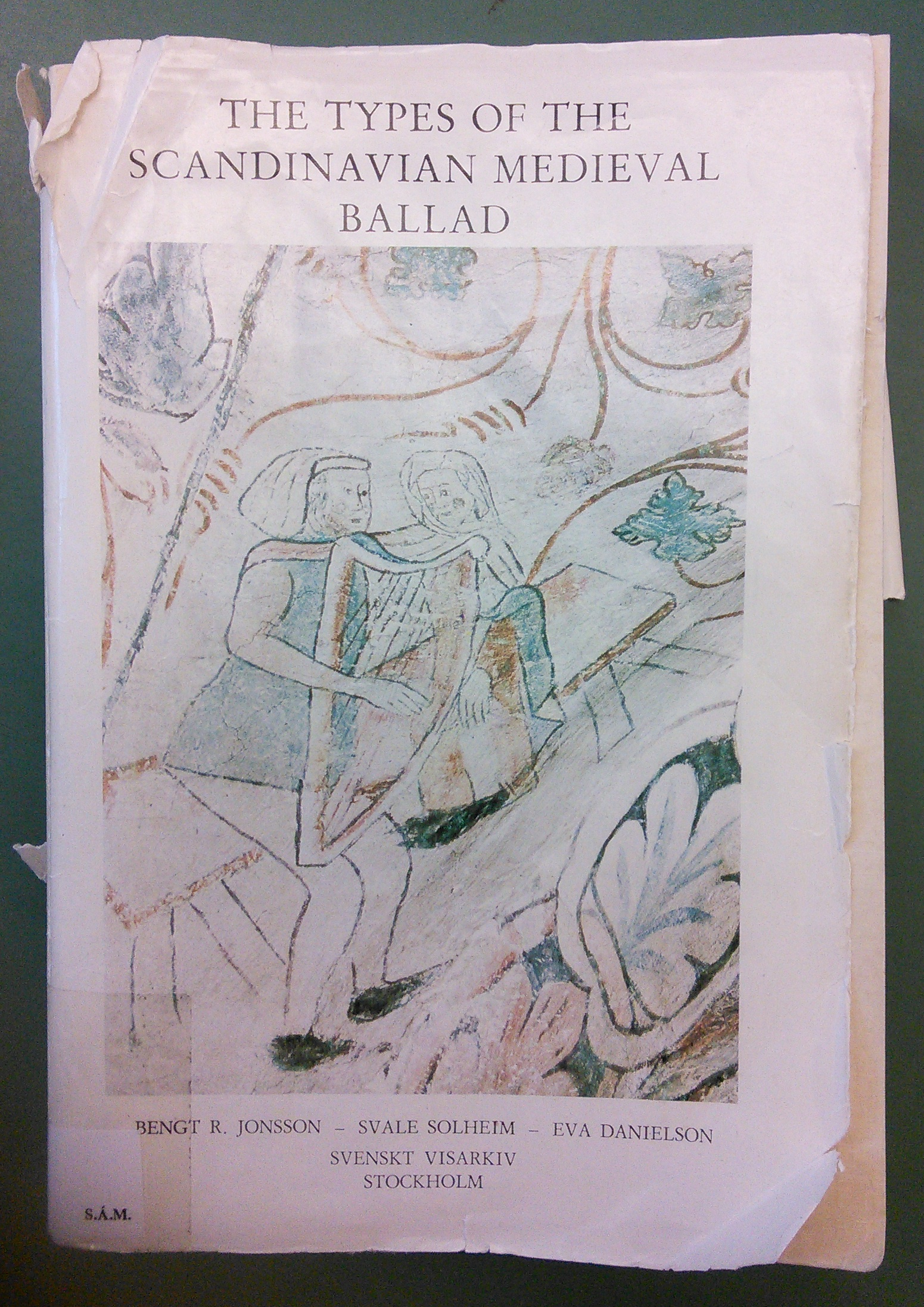
- The cover of The Types of the Scandinavian Medieval Ballad: A Descriptive Catalogue, ed. by Bengt R. Jonsson, Svale Solheim and Eva Danielson, Skrifter utgivna av svenskt visarkiv, 5 (Stockholm: Svenskt visarkiv, 1978).

The Types of the Scandinavian Medieval Ballad: A Descriptive Catalogue (TSB) is the designation for a cataloguing system for Scandinavian ballads.

It is also the title of the underlying reference book: The Types of the Scandinavian Medieval Ballad: A Descriptive Catalogue, edited by Bengt R. Jonsson, Svale Solheim and Eva Danielson, in collaboration with Mortan Nolsøe and W. Edson Richmond, published in 1978 in two places: as volume 5 of the series Skrifter utgivna av svenskt visarkiv (Stockholm: Svenskt visarkiv), and as volume 59 of series B of Oslo's Instituttet for sammenlignende kulturforskning (The Institute for Comparative Research in Human Culture) (Oslo, Bergen, and Tromsø: Universitetsforlaget; ISBN 82-00-09479-0).

It attempts to classify all specimens of traditional ballads known in one or more of the Scandinavian languages (Danish, Norwegian, Swedish, Icelandic, Faeroese, and the extinct Norn).

== Structure and scope ==
Cognate ballads are assigned the same "TSB No." such as "A 38" (A 38: "The Two Sisters"), "A 50" (A 50: "Harpans kraft"), or "A65" (A 65: "Elvehøj — Knight released from elves at dawn"). It is somewhat analogous to the Aarne–Thompson classification system or motif-index for folktale studies, except that each ballad can only have one TSB No., whereas any given folktale can exhibit several motifs.

The TSB divides its list of types into six groups (with some subgroups), as below. The division essentially follows the one by A. I. Arwidsson, and Svend Grundtvig's original division in Danmarks gamle folkeviser (DgF); however, many of the ballads Grundtvig placed in group C have been reclassified. The number of ballad types in each group in the second printed edition of TSB from 1978 is given within parentheses. Since then, more types have been added to group F.

Ballad types in TSB:
A:	Ballads of the supernatural;	(75 types)
B:	Legendary ballads;	(37 types)
C:	Historical ballads;	(41 types)
D:	Ballads of chivalry;	(441 types)
E:	Heroic ballads;	(167 types)
F:	Jocular ballads.	(77 types)

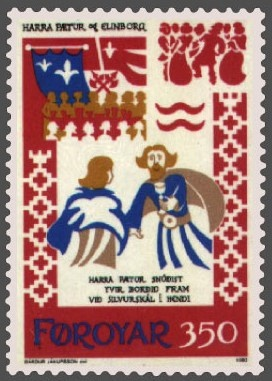
"Harra Pætur og Elinborg" (TSB D 72)

Each ballad type is given a short description, including a summary of the differences of the variants of the ballad and how they differ, and comprises a list of appearances in various Nordic ballad collections.

Almost all of the ballad types given in the Danish (DgF), Faroese (CCF), Icelandic (IFkv), or Swedish (SMB) ballad type listings also have a specific TSB type listing. (The exceptions are a few texts, which now are known to be of rather recent origin, or are otherwise found to be deficient.) Norsk visearkiv, which is responsible for the corresponding Norwegian ballad project, has decided to employ the TSB classification directly. Many Scandinavian ballad types are also easily recognised in ballad collections from other languages. E.g., the aforementioned type TSB A 38 corresponds to Child 10.

== See also ==
- Danmarks gamle Folkeviser
- Sveriges Medeltida Ballader
- List of folk song collections
