= Elf =

Supernatural being in Germanic folklore

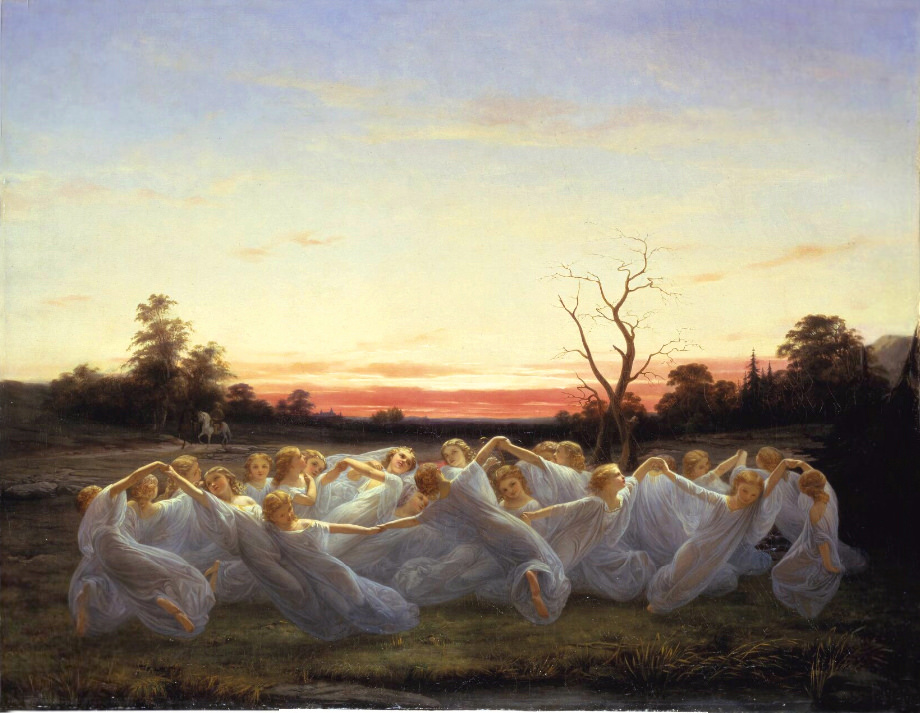
Ängsälvor (Swedish "Meadow Elves") by Nils Blommér (1850)

An elf (pl. elves) is a type of humanoid supernatural being in Germanic folklore. Elves appear especially in North Germanic mythology, being mentioned in the Icelandic Poetic Edda and the Prose Edda.

In medieval Germanic-speaking cultures, elves were thought of as beings with magical powers and supernatural beauty, ambivalent towards everyday people, and capable of either helping or hindering them. Beliefs varied considerably over time and space and flourished in both pre-Christian and Christian cultures. The word elf is found throughout the Germanic languages. It seems originally to have meant 'white being'. However, reconstructing the early concept depends largely on texts written by Christians, in Old and Middle English, medieval German, and Old Norse. These associate elves variously with the gods of Norse mythology, with causing illness, with magic, and with beauty and seduction.

After the medieval period, the word elf became less common throughout the Germanic languages, losing out to terms like Zwerg ('dwarf') in German and huldra ('hidden being') in North Germanic languages, and to loan-words like fairy (borrowed from French). Still, belief in elves persisted in the early modern period, particularly in Scotland and Scandinavia, where elves were thought of as magically powerful people living, usually invisibly, alongside human communities. They continued to be associated with causing illnesses and with sexual threats. For example, several early modern ballads in the British Isles and Scandinavia, originating in the medieval period, describe elves attempting to seduce or abduct human characters.

With modern urbanisation and industrialisation, belief in elves declined rapidly, though Iceland has some claim to continued popular belief. Elves started to be prominent in the literature and art of educated elites from the early modern period onwards. These literary elves were imagined as tiny, playful beings, with William Shakespeare's A Midsummer Night's Dream a key development of this idea. In the eighteenth century, German Romantic writers were influenced by this notion of the elf, and re-imported the English word elf into the German language. From the Romantic notion came the elves of modern popular culture. Christmas elves are a relatively recent creation, popularized during the late 19th century in the United States. Elves entered the twentieth-century high fantasy genre in the wake of J. R. R. Tolkien's works; these re-popularised the idea of elves as human-sized and humanlike beings. Elves remain a prominent feature of fantasy media today.

== Etymology ==
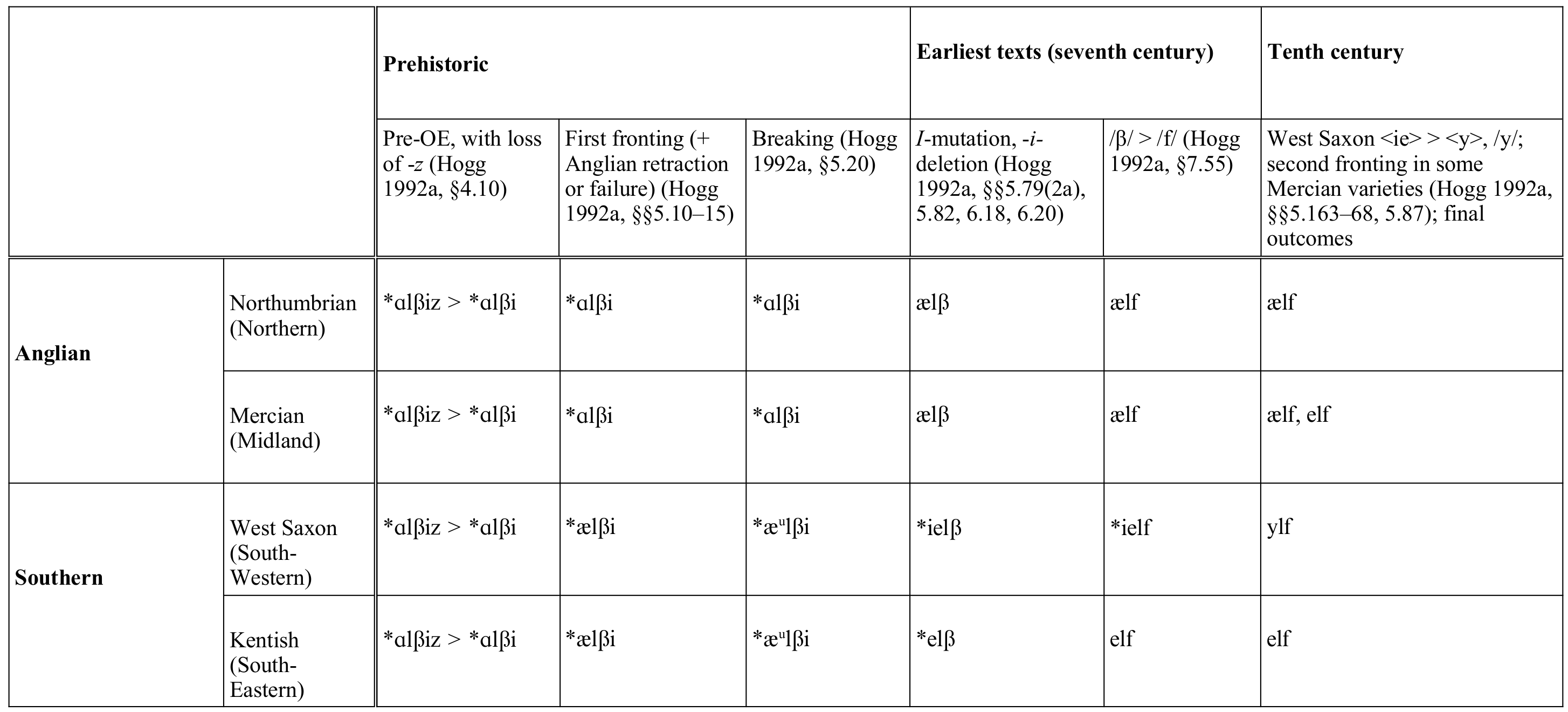
A chart showing how the sound of the word elf has changed in the history of English

The English word elf is from the Old English word most often attested as ælf (whose plural would have been *ælfe). Although this word took a variety of forms in different Old English dialects, these converged on the form elf during the Middle English period. During the Old English period, separate forms were used for female elves (such as ælfen, putatively from Proto-Germanic **ɑlβ(i)innjō), but during the Middle English period the word elf routinely came to include female beings.

The Old English forms are cognates – having a common origin – with medieval Germanic terms such as Old Norse alfr ('elf'; plural alfar), Old High German alp ('evil spirit'; pl. alpî, elpî; feminine elbe), Burgundian *alfs ('elf'), and Middle Low German alf ('evil spirit'). These words must come from Proto-Germanic, the ancestor-language of the attested Germanic languages; the Proto-Germanic forms are reconstructed as *ɑlβi-z and *ɑlβɑ-z.

Germanic *ɑlβi-z~*ɑlβɑ-z is generally agreed to be a cognate with Latin albus ('(matt) white'), Old Irish ailbhín ('flock'), Ancient Greek ἀλφός (alphós; 'whiteness, white leprosy'), and Albanian elb ('barley'); and the Germanic word for 'swan' reconstructed as *albit- (compare Modern Icelandic álpt). These all come from a Proto-Indo-European root *h₂elbʰ-, and seem to be connected by the idea of whiteness. The Germanic word presumably originally meant 'white one', perhaps as a euphemism. Jakob Grimm thought whiteness implied positive moral connotations, and, noting Snorri Sturluson's ljósálfar, suggested that elves were divinities of light. This is not necessarily the case, however. For example, because the cognates suggest matte white rather than shining white, and because in medieval Scandinavian texts whiteness is associated with beauty, Alaric Hall has suggested that elves may have been called 'the white people' because whiteness was associated with (specifically feminine) beauty.

A completely different etymology, making elf a cognate with the Ṛbhus, semi-divine craftsmen in Indian mythology, was suggested by Adalbert Kuhn in 1855. In this case, *ɑlβi-z would connote the meaning 'skilful, inventive, clever', and could be a cognate with Latin labour, in the sense of 'creative work'. While often mentioned, this etymology is not widely accepted.

=== In proper names ===
Throughout the medieval Germanic languages, elf was one of the nouns used in personal names, almost invariably as a first element. These names may have been influenced by Celtic names beginning in Albio- such as Albiorix.

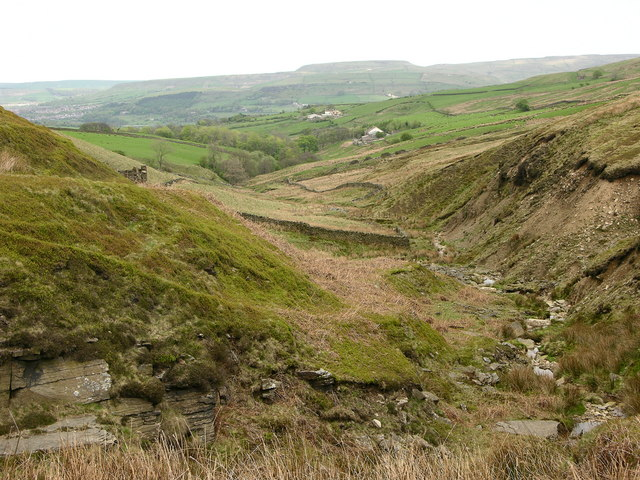
Alden Valley, Lancashire, a place possibly once associated with elves

Personal names provide the only evidence for elf in Gothic, which must have had the word *albs (plural *albeis). The most famous name of this kind is Alboin. Old English names in elf- include the cognate of Alboin Ælfwine (literally "elf-friend", m.), Ælfric ("elf-powerful", m.), Ælfweard ("elf-guardian", m.), and Ælfwaru ("elf-care", f.). A widespread survivor of these in modern English is Alfred (Old English Ælfrēd, "elf-advice"). Also surviving are the English surname Elgar (Ælfgar, "elf-spear"), and the name of St Alphege (Ælfhēah, "elf-tall"). German examples are Alberich, Alphart and Alphere (father of Walter of Aquitaine) and Icelandic examples include Álfhildur. These names suggest that elves were positively regarded in early Germanic culture. Of the many words for supernatural beings in Germanic languages, the only ones regularly used in personal names are elf and words denoting pagan gods, suggesting that elves were considered to be similar to gods.

In later Old Icelandic, alfr ("elf") and the personal name which in Common Germanic had been *Aþa(l)wulfaz; coincidentally, both became álfr~Álfr.

Elves appear in some place names; however, it is difficult to be sure how many because other words, including personal names, can appear similar to elf, such as al- (from eald) meaning "old". The clearest appearances of elves in English examples are Elveden ("elves' hill", Suffolk) and Elvendon ("elves' valley", Oxfordshire); other examples may be Eldon Hill ("Elves'-hill hill", Derbyshire); and Alden Valley ("elves' hill valley", Lancashire). These associate elves fairly consistently with woods and valleys.

== In medieval texts ==
=== Medieval English-language sources ===
==== As causes of illnesses ====
The earliest surviving manuscripts mentioning elves in any Germanic language are from Anglo-Saxon England. Medieval English evidence has, therefore, attracted quite extensive research and debate. In Old English, elves are most often mentioned in medical texts which attest to the belief that elves might afflict humans and livestock with illnesses: apparently mostly sharp, internal pains and mental disorders. The most famous of the medical texts is the metrical charm Wið færstice ("against a stabbing pain"), from the tenth-century compilation Lacnunga, but most of the attestations are in the tenth-century Bald's Leechbook and Leechbook III. This tradition continues into later English-language traditions too: elves continue to appear in Middle English medical texts.

Belief in elves as a cause of illnesses remained prominent in early modern Scotland, where elves were viewed as supernaturally powerful people who lived invisibly alongside everyday rural people. Thus, elves were often mentioned in the early modern Scottish witchcraft trials: many witnesses in the trials believed themselves to have been given healing powers or to know of people or animals made sick by elves. Throughout these sources, elves are sometimes associated with the succubus-like supernatural being called the mare.

While they may have been thought to cause diseases with magical weapons, elves are more clearly associated in Old English with a kind of magic denoted by Old English sīden and sīdsa, a cognate with the Old Norse seiðr, and paralleled in the Old Irish Serglige Con Culainn. By the fourteenth century, they were also associated with the arcane practice of alchemy.

==== "Elf-shot" ====
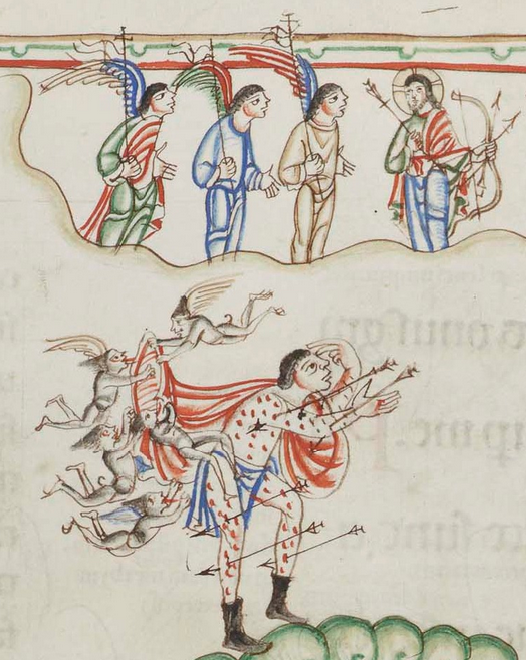
The Eadwine Psalter, f. 66r. Detail: Christ and demons attacking the psalmist.

In one or two Old English medical texts, elves might be envisaged as inflicting illnesses with projectiles. In the twentieth century, scholars often labelled the illnesses elves caused as "elf-shot", but work from the 1990s onwards showed that the medieval evidence for elves' being thought to cause illnesses in this way is slender; debate about its significance is ongoing.

The noun elf-shot is first attested in a Scots poem, "Rowlis Cursing", from around 1500, where "elf schot" is listed among a range of curses to be inflicted on some chicken thieves. The term may not always have denoted an actual projectile: shot could mean "a sharp pain". But in early modern Scotland, elf-schot and other terms like elf-arrowhead are sometimes used of neolithic arrow-heads, apparently thought to have been made by elves. In a few witchcraft trials, people attested that these arrow-heads were used in healing rituals, and occasionally alleged that witches (and perhaps elves) used them to injure people and cattle. A 1749–50 ode by William Collins includes the lines:

There every herd, by sad experience, knows
How, winged with fate, their elf-shot arrows fly,
When the sick ewe her summer food forgoes,
Or, stretched on earth, the heart-smit heifers lie.

==== Size, appearance, and sexuality ====
Because of elves' association with illness, in the twentieth century, most scholars imagined that elves in the Anglo-Saxon tradition were small, invisible, demonic beings, causing illnesses with arrows. This was encouraged by the idea that "elf-shot" is depicted in the Eadwine Psalter, in an image which became well known in this connection. However, this is now thought to be a misunderstanding: the image proves to be a conventional illustration of God's arrows and Christian demons. Rather, twenty-first century scholarship suggests that Anglo-Saxon elves, like elves in Scandinavia or the Irish Aos Sí, were regarded as people.

"⁊ ylfe" ("and elves") in Beowulf

Like words for gods and men, the word elf is used in personal names where words for monsters and demons are not. Just as álfar is associated with Æsir in Old Norse, the Old English Wið færstice associates elves with ēse; whatever this word meant by the tenth century, etymologically it denoted pagan gods. In Old English, the plural ylfe (attested in Beowulf) is grammatically an ethnonym (a word for an ethnic group), suggesting that elves were seen as people. As well as appearing in medical texts, the Old English word ælf and its feminine derivative ælbinne were used in glosses to translate Latin words for nymphs. This fits well with the word ælfscȳne, which meant "elf-beautiful" and is attested describing the seductively beautiful Biblical heroines Sarah and Judith.

Likewise, in Middle English and early modern Scottish evidence, while still appearing as causes of harm and danger, elves appear clearly as humanlike beings. They became associated with medieval chivalric romance traditions of fairies and particularly with the idea of a Fairy Queen. A propensity to seduce or rape people becomes increasingly prominent in the source material. Around the fifteenth century, evidence starts to appear for the belief that elves might steal human babies and replace them with changelings.

==== Decline in the use of the word elf ====
By the end of the medieval period, elf was increasingly being supplanted by the French loan-word fairy. An example is Geoffrey Chaucer's satirical tale Sir Thopas, where the title character sets out in a quest for the "elf-queen", who dwells in the "countree of the Faerie".

=== Old Norse texts ===
==== Mythological texts ====
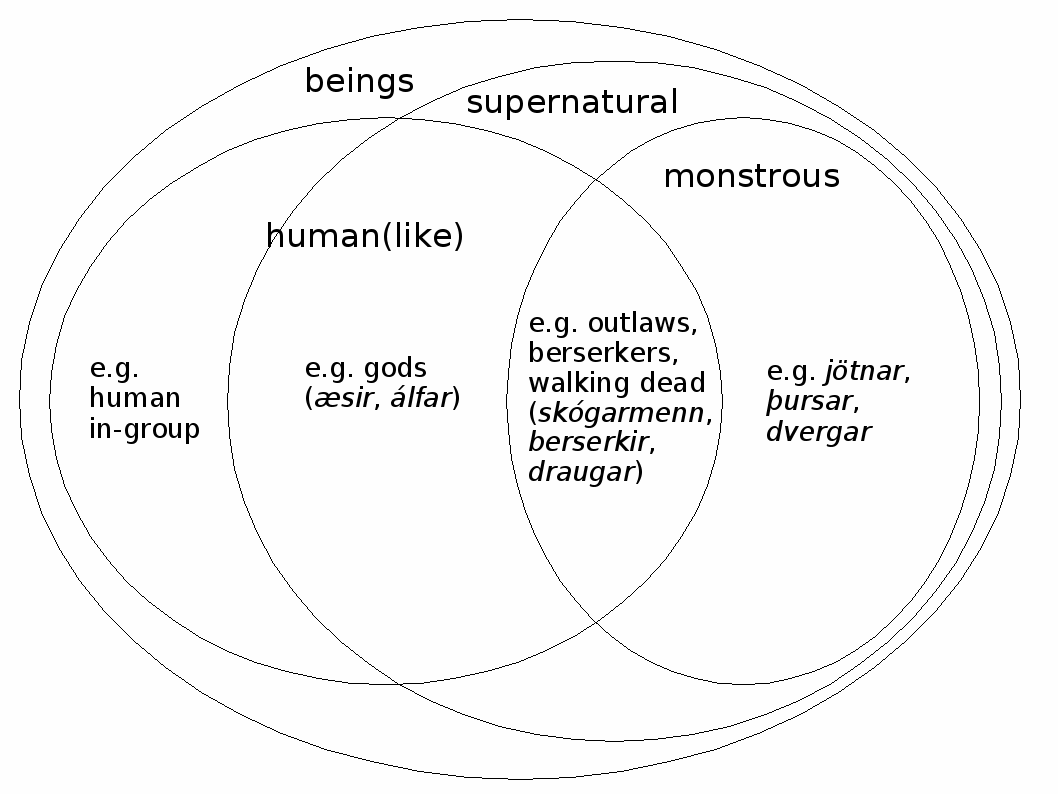
One possible semantic field diagram of words for sentient beings in Old Norse, showing their relationships as an Euler diagram

Evidence for elf beliefs in medieval Scandinavia outside Iceland is sparse, but the Icelandic evidence is uniquely rich. For a long time, views about elves in Old Norse mythology were defined by Snorri Sturluson's Prose Edda, which talks about svartálfar, dökkálfar and ljósálfar ("black elves", "dark elves", and "light elves"). For example, Snorri recounts how the svartálfar create new blond hair for Thor's wife Sif after Loki had shorn off Sif's long hair. However, these terms are attested only in the Prose Edda and texts based on it. It is now agreed that they reflect traditions of dwarves, demons, and angels, partly showing Snorri's "paganisation" of a Christian cosmology learned from the Elucidarius, a popular digest of Christian thought.

Scholars of Old Norse mythology now focus on references to elves in Old Norse poetry, particularly the Elder Edda. The only character explicitly identified as an elf in classical Eddaic poetry, if any, is Völundr, the protagonist of Völundarkviða. However, elves are frequently mentioned in the alliterating phrase Æsir ok Álfar ('Æsir and elves') and its variants. This was a well-established poetic formula, indicating a strong tradition of associating elves with the group of gods known as the Æsir, or even suggesting that the elves and Æsir were one and the same. The pairing is paralleled in the Old English poem Wið færstice and in the Germanic personal name system; moreover, in Skaldic verse the word elf is used in the same way as words for gods. Sigvatr Þórðarson's skaldic travelogue Austrfaravísur, composed around 1020, mentions an álfablót ('elves' sacrifice') in Edskogen in what is now southern Sweden. There does not seem to have been any clear-cut distinction between humans and gods; like the Æsir, then, elves were presumably thought of as being humanlike and existing in opposition to the giants. Many commentators have also (or instead) argued for conceptual overlap between elves and dwarves in Old Norse mythology, which may fit with trends in the medieval German evidence.

There are hints that the god Freyr was associated with elves. In particular, Álfheimr (literally "elf-world") is mentioned as being given to Freyr in Grímnismál. Snorri Sturluson identified Freyr as one of the Vanir. However, the term Vanir is rare in Eddaic verse, very rare in Skaldic verse, and is not generally thought to appear in other Germanic languages. Given the link between Freyr and the elves, it has therefore long been suspected that álfar and Vanir are, more or less, different words for the same group of beings. However, this is not uniformly accepted.

A kenning (poetic metaphor) for the sun, álfröðull (literally "elf disc"), is of uncertain meaning but is to some suggestive of a close link between elves and the sun.

Although the relevant words are of slightly uncertain meaning, it seems fairly clear that Völundr is described as one of the elves in Völundarkviða. As his most prominent deed in the poem is to rape Böðvildr, the poem associates elves with being a sexual threat to maidens. The same idea is present in two post-classical Eddaic poems, which are also influenced by chivalric romance or Breton lais, Kötludraumur and Gullkársljóð. The idea also occurs in later traditions in Scandinavia and beyond, so it may be an early attestation of a prominent tradition. Elves also appear in a couple of verse spells, including the Bergen rune-charm from among the Bryggen inscriptions.

==== Other sources ====
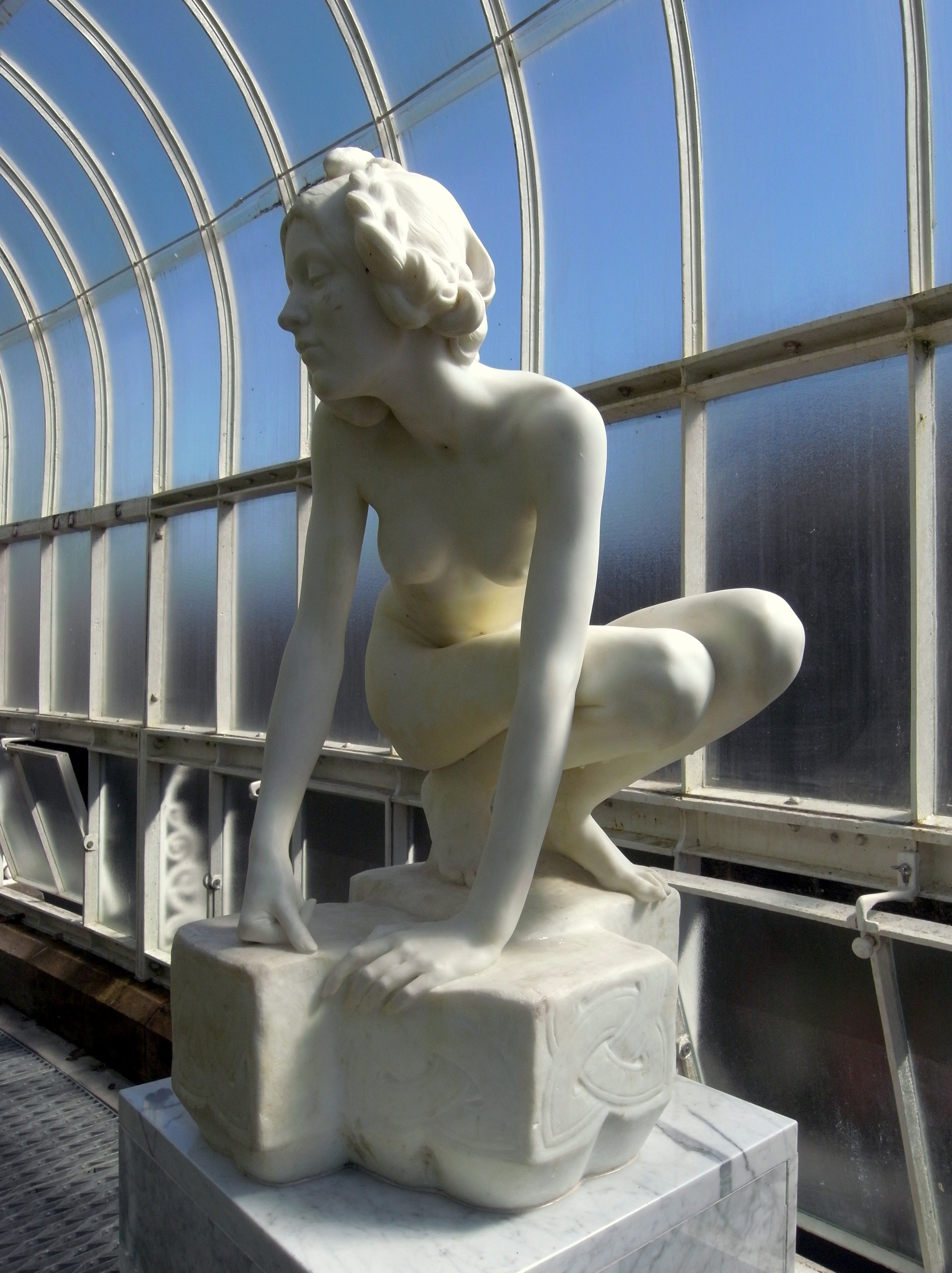
Glasgow Botanic Gardens. Kibble Palace. William Goscombe John, The Elf, 1899.

The appearance of elves in sagas is closely defined by genre. The Sagas of Icelanders, Bishops' sagas, and contemporary sagas, whose portrayal of the supernatural is generally restrained, rarely mention álfar, and then only in passing. But although limited, these texts provide some of the best evidence for the presence of elves in everyday beliefs in medieval Scandinavia. They include a fleeting mention of elves seen out riding in 1168 (in Sturlunga saga); mention of an álfablót ("elves' sacrifice") in Kormáks saga; and the existence of the euphemism ganga álfrek ('go to drive away the elves') for "going to the toilet" in Eyrbyggja saga.

The Kings' sagas include a rather elliptical but widely studied account of an early Swedish king being worshipped after his death and being called Ólafr Geirstaðaálfr ('Ólafr the elf of Geirstaðir'), and a demonic elf at the beginning of Norna-Gests þáttr.

The legendary sagas tend to focus on elves as legendary ancestors or on heroes' sexual relations with elf-women. Mention of the land of Álfheimr is found in Heimskringla while Þorsteins saga Víkingssonar recounts a line of local kings who ruled over Álfheim, who since they had elven blood were said to be more beautiful than most men. According to Hrólfs saga kraka, Hrolfr Kraki's half-sister Skuld was the half-elven child of King Helgi and an elf-woman (álfkona). Skuld was skilled in witchcraft (seiðr). Accounts of Skuld in earlier sources, however, do not include this material. The Þiðreks saga version of the Nibelungen (Niflungar) describes Högni as the son of a human queen and an elf, but no such lineage is reported in the Eddas, Völsunga saga, or the Nibelungenlied. The relatively few mentions of elves in the chivalric sagas tend even to be whimsical.

In his Rerum Danicarum fragmenta (1596) written mostly in Latin with some Old Danish and Old Icelandic passages, Arngrímur Jónsson explains the Scandinavian and Icelandic belief in elves (called Allffuafolch). Both Continental Scandinavia and Iceland have a scattering of mentions of elves in medical texts, sometimes in Latin and sometimes in the form of amulets, where elves are viewed as a possible cause of illness. Most of them have Low German connections.

Sometimes elves are, like dwarves, associated with craftsmanship. Wayland the Smith embodies this feature. He is known under many names, depending on the language in which the stories were distributed. The names include Völund in Old Norse, Wēland in Anglo-Saxon and Wieland in German. The story of Wayland is also to be found in the Prose Edda.

=== Medieval and early modern German texts ===
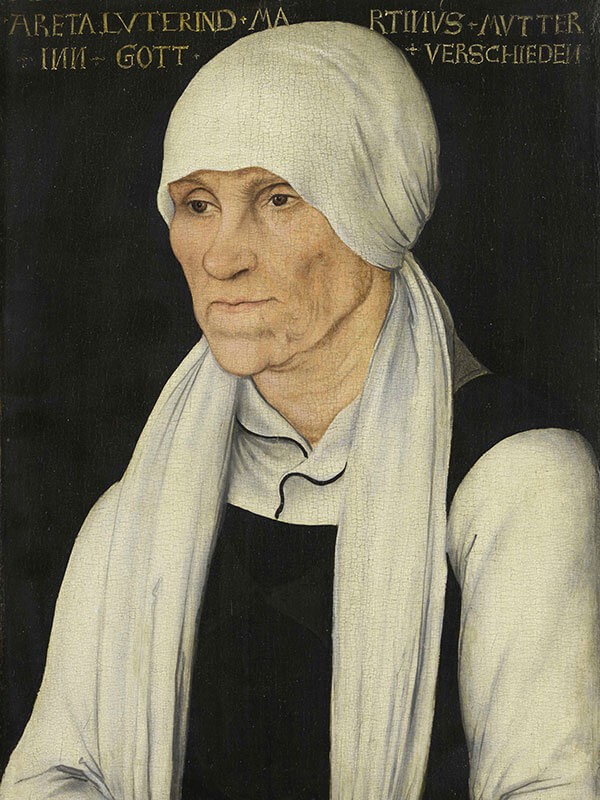
Portrait of Margarethe Luther, believed by her son Martin to have been afflicted by elbe ("elves")

The Old High German word alp is attested only in a small number of glosses. It is defined by the Althochdeutsches Wörterbuch as a "nature-god or nature-demon, equated with the Fauns of Classical mythology ... regarded as eerie, ferocious beings ... As the mare he messes around with women". Accordingly, the German word Alpdruck (literally "elf-oppression") means "nightmare". There is also evidence associating elves with illness, specifically epilepsy.

In a similar vein, elves are in Middle High German most often associated with deceiving or bewildering people in a phrase that occurs so often it would appear to be proverbial: die elben/der alp trieget mich ("the elves/elf are/is deceiving me"). The same pattern holds in Early Modern German. This deception sometimes shows the seductive side apparent in English and Scandinavian material: most famously, the early thirteenth-century Heinrich von Morungen's fifth Minnesang begins "Von den elben wirt entsehen vil manic man / Sô bin ich von grôzer liebe entsên" ("full many a man is bewitched by elves / thus I too am bewitched by great love"). Elbe was also used in this period to translate words for nymphs.

In later medieval prayers, Elves appear as a threatening, even demonic, force. For example, some prayers invoke God's help against nocturnal attacks by Alpe. Correspondingly, in the early modern period, elves are described in north Germany doing the evil bidding of witches; Martin Luther believed his mother to have been afflicted in this way. As in Old Norse, however, there are few characters identified as elves. It seems likely that in the German-speaking world, elves were to a significant extent conflated with dwarves (Middle High German: getwerc). Thus, some dwarves that appear in German heroic poetry have been seen as relating to elves. In particular, nineteenth-century scholars tended to think that the dwarf Alberich, whose name etymologically means "elf-powerful", was influenced by early traditions of elves.

== Post-medieval folklore ==
=== Britain ===
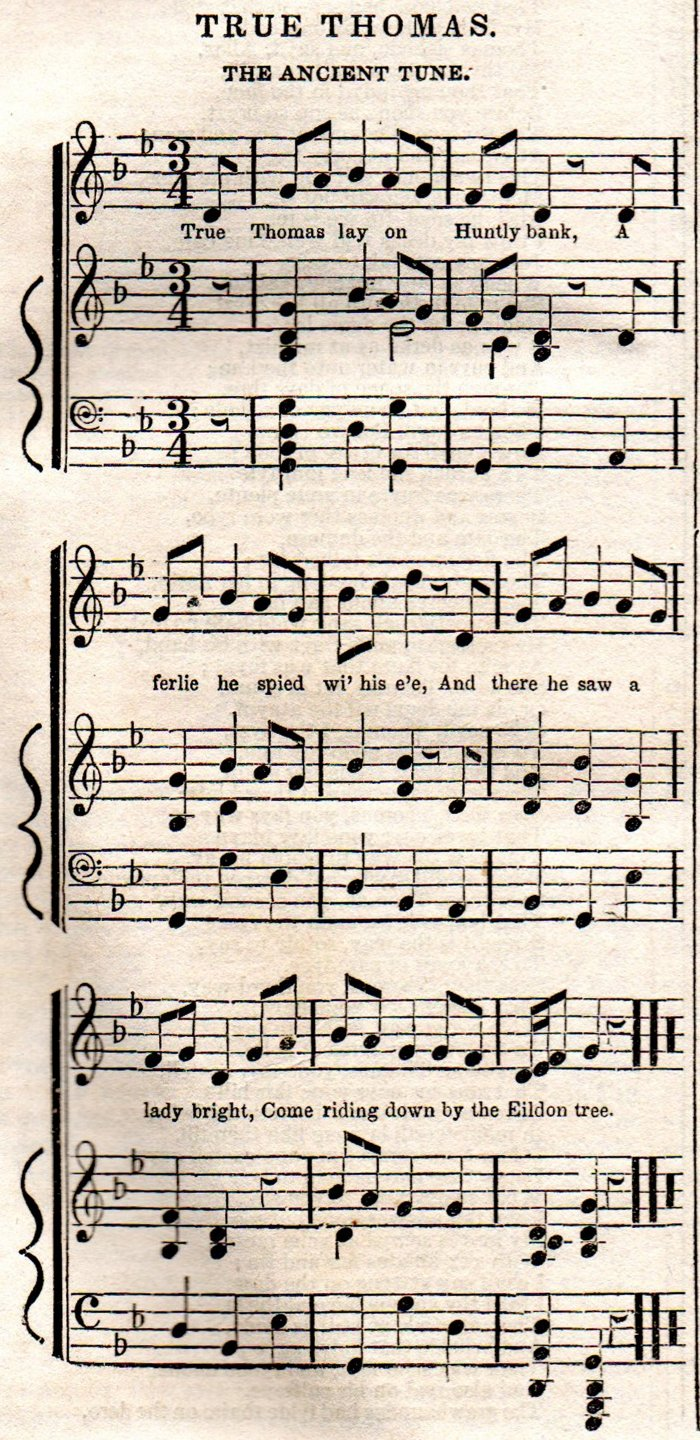
Thomas the Rhymer in Walter Scott's Minstrelsy of the Scottish Border

From around the Late Middle Ages, the word elf began to be used in English as a term loosely synonymous with the French loan-word fairy; in elite art and literature, at least, it also became associated with diminutive supernatural beings like Puck, hobgoblins, Robin Goodfellow, the English and Scots brownie, and the Northumbrian English hob. However, in Scotland and parts of northern England near the Scottish border, beliefs in elves remained prominent into the nineteenth century. James VI of Scotland and Robert Kirk discussed elves seriously; elf beliefs are prominently attested in the Scottish witchcraft trials, particularly the trial of Issobel Gowdie; and related stories also appear in folktales, There is a significant corpus of ballads narrating stories about elves, such as Thomas the Rhymer, where a man meets a female elf; Tam Lin, The Elfin Knight, and Lady Isabel and the Elf-Knight, in which an Elf-Knight rapes, seduces, or abducts a woman; and The Queen of Elfland's Nourice, a woman is abducted to be a wet-nurse to the elf queen's baby, but promised that she might return home once the child is weaned.

=== Scandinavia ===
==== Terminology ====
In Scandinavian folklore, many humanlike supernatural beings are attested, which might be thought of as elves and partly originate in medieval Scandinavian beliefs. However, the characteristics and names of these beings have varied widely across time and space, and they cannot be neatly categorised. These beings are sometimes known by words descended directly from the Old Norse álfr. However, in modern languages, traditional terms related to álfr have tended to be replaced with other terms. Things are further complicated because when referring to the elves of Old Norse mythology, scholars have adopted new forms based directly on the Old Norse word álfr. The following table summarises the situation in the main modern standard languages of Scandinavia.

Language	Terms related to elf in traditional usage	Main terms of similar meaning in traditional usage	Scholarly term for Norse mythological elves
Danish	elver, elverfolk, ellefolk	nøkke, nisse, fe	alf
Swedish	älva	skogsrå, skogsfru, tomte	alv, alf
Norwegian (bokmål)	alv, alvefolk	vette, huldra	alv
Icelandic	álfur	huldufólk	álfur

==== Appearance and behaviour ====
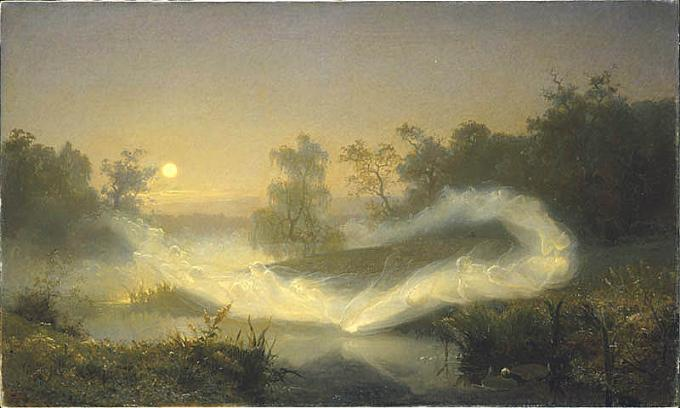
Älvalek, "Elf Play" by August Malmström (1866)

The elves of Norse mythology have survived into folklore mainly as females, living in hills and mounds of stones. The Swedish älvor were stunningly beautiful girls who lived in the forest with an elven king.

The elves could be seen dancing over meadows, particularly at night and on misty mornings. They left a circle where they had danced, called älvdanser (elf dances) or älvringar (elf circles), and to urinate in one was thought to cause venereal diseases. Typically, elf circles were fairy rings consisting of a ring of small mushrooms, but there was also another kind of elf circle. In the words of the local historian Anne Marie Hellström:

... on lake shores, where the forest met the lake, you could find elf circles. They were round places where the grass had been flattened like a floor. Elves had danced there. By Lake Tisnaren, I have seen one of those. It could be dangerous, and one could become ill if one had trodden over such a place or if one destroyed anything there.

If a human watched the dance of the elves, they would discover that even though only a few hours seemed to have passed, many years had passed in the real world. Humans being invited or lured to the elf dance is a common motif transferred from older Scandinavian ballads.

Elves were not exclusively young and beautiful. In the Swedish folktale Little Rosa and Long Leda, an elvish woman (älvakvinna) arrives in the end and saves the heroine, Little Rose, on the condition that the king's cattle no longer graze on her hill. She is described as a beautiful old woman and by her aspect people saw that she belonged to the subterraneans.

==== In ballads ====
Elves have a prominent place in several closely related ballads, which must have originated in the Middle Ages but are first attested in the early modern period. Many of these ballads are first attested in Karen Brahes Folio, a Danish manuscript from the 1570s, but they circulated widely in Scandinavia and northern Britain. They sometimes mention elves because they were learned by heart, even though that term had become archaic in everyday usage. They have therefore played a major role in transmitting traditional ideas about elves in post-medieval cultures. Indeed, some of the early modern ballads are still quite widely known, whether through school syllabuses or contemporary folk music. They, therefore, give people an unusual degree of access to ideas of elves from older traditional culture.

The ballads are characterised by sexual encounters between everyday people and humanlike beings referred to in at least some variants as elves (the same characters also appear as mermen, dwarves, and other kinds of supernatural beings). The elves pose a threat to the everyday community by luring people into the elves' world. The most famous example is Elveskud and its many variants (paralleled in English as Clerk Colvill), where a woman from the elf world tries to tempt a young knight to join her in dancing, or to live among the elves; in some versions he refuses, and in some he accepts, but in either case he dies, tragically. As in Elveskud, sometimes the everyday person is a man and the elf a woman, as also in Elvehøj (much the same story as Elveskud, but with a happy ending), Herr Magnus og Bjærgtrolden, Herr Tønne af Alsø, Herr Bøsmer i elvehjem, or the Northern British Thomas the Rhymer. Sometimes the everyday person is a woman, and the elf is a man, as in the northern British Tam Lin, The Elfin Knight, and Lady Isabel and the Elf-Knight, in which the Elf-Knight bears away Isabel to murder her, or the Scandinavian Harpans kraft. In The Queen of Elfland's Nourice, a woman is abducted to be a wet nurse to the elf-queen's baby, but promised that she might return home once the child is weaned.

==== As causes of illness ====
The "Elf cross" which protected against malevolent elves.

In folk stories, Scandinavian elves often play the role of disease spirits. The most common, though the also most harmless case was various irritating skin rashes, which were called älvablåst (elven puff) and could be cured by a forceful counter-blow (a handy pair of bellows was most useful for this purpose). Skålgropar, a particular kind of petroglyph (pictogram on a rock) found in Scandinavia, were known in older times as älvkvarnar (elven mills), because it was believed elves had used them. One could appease the elves by offering a treat (preferably butter) placed into an elven mill. In his book Nordiska Väsen, Swedish author Johan Egerkrans writes that the cure was rather to lubricate the mill with butter and to place an offer of gold inside the mill.

In order to protect themselves and their livestock against malevolent elves, Scandinavians could use a so-called Elf cross (Alfkors, Älvkors or Ellakors), which was carved into buildings or other objects. It existed in two shapes, one was a pentagram, and it was still frequently used in early 20th-century Sweden as painted or carved onto doors, walls, and household utensils to protect against elves. The second form was an ordinary cross carved onto a round or oblong silver plate. This second kind of elf cross was worn as a pendant in a necklace, and to have sufficient magic, it had to be forged during three evenings with silver, from nine different sources of inherited silver. In some locations it also had to be on the altar of a church for three consecutive Sundays.

==== Modern continuations ====
In Iceland, expressing belief in the huldufólk ("hidden people"), elves that dwell in rock formations, is still relatively common. Even when Icelanders do not explicitly express their belief, they are often reluctant to express disbelief. A 2006 and 2007 study by the University of Iceland's Faculty of Social Sciences revealed that many would not rule out the existence of elves and ghosts, a result similar to a 1974 survey by Erlendur Haraldsson. The lead researcher of the 2006–2007 study, Terry Gunnell, stated: "Icelanders seem much more open to phenomena like dreaming the future, forebodings, ghosts and elves than other nations". Whether significant numbers of Icelandic people do believe in elves or not, elves are certainly prominent in national discourses. They occur most often in oral narratives and news reporting in which they disrupt house- and road-building. In the analysis of Valdimar Tr. Hafstein, "narratives about the insurrections of elves demonstrate supernatural sanction against development and urbanization; that is to say, the supernaturals protect and enforce religious values and traditional rural culture. The elves fend off, with more or less success, the attacks, and advances of modern technology, palpable in the bulldozer." Elves are also prominent, in similar roles, in contemporary Icelandic literature.

Folk stories told in the nineteenth century about elves are still told in modern Denmark and Sweden. Still, they now feature ethnic minorities in place of elves in essentially racist discourse. In an ethnically fairly homogeneous medieval countryside, supernatural beings provided the Other through which everyday people created their identities; in cosmopolitan industrial contexts, ethnic minorities or immigrants are used in storytelling to similar effect.

== Post-medieval elite culture ==
=== Early modern elite culture ===
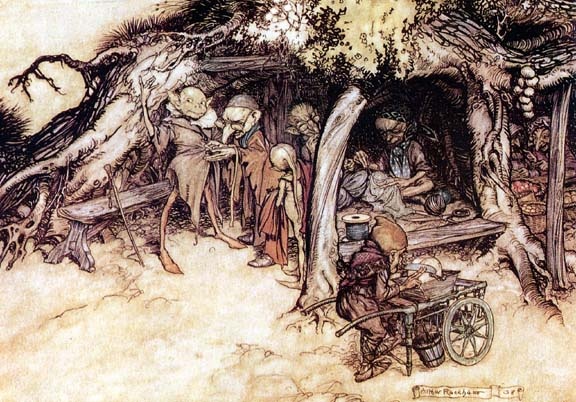
Illustration by Arthur Rackham for William Shakespeare's A Midsummer Night's Dream

Early modern Europe saw the emergence of a distinctive elite culture: while the Reformation encouraged new scepticism and opposition to traditional beliefs, subsequent Romanticism encouraged the fetishisation of such beliefs by intellectual elites. The effects of this on writing about elves are most apparent in England and Germany, with developments in each country influencing the other. In Scandinavia, the Romantic movement was also prominent, and literary writing was the main context for continued use of the word elf, except in fossilised words for illnesses. However, oral traditions about beings like elves remained prominent in Scandinavia into the early twentieth century.

Elves entered early modern elite culture most clearly in the literature of Elizabethan England. Here Edmund Spenser's Faerie Queene (1590–) used fairy and elf interchangeably of human-sized beings, but they are complex, imaginary and allegorical figures. Spenser also presented his own explanation of the origins of the Elfe and Elfin kynd, claiming that they were created by Prometheus. Likewise, William Shakespeare, in a speech in Romeo and Juliet (1592) has an "elf-lock" (tangled hair) being caused by Queen Mab, who is referred to as "the fairies' midwife". Meanwhile, A Midsummer Night's Dream promoted the idea that elves were diminutive and ethereal. The influence of Shakespeare and Michael Drayton made the use of elf and fairy for very small beings the norm, and had a lasting effect seen in fairy tales about elves, collected in the modern period.

=== Romantic movement ===
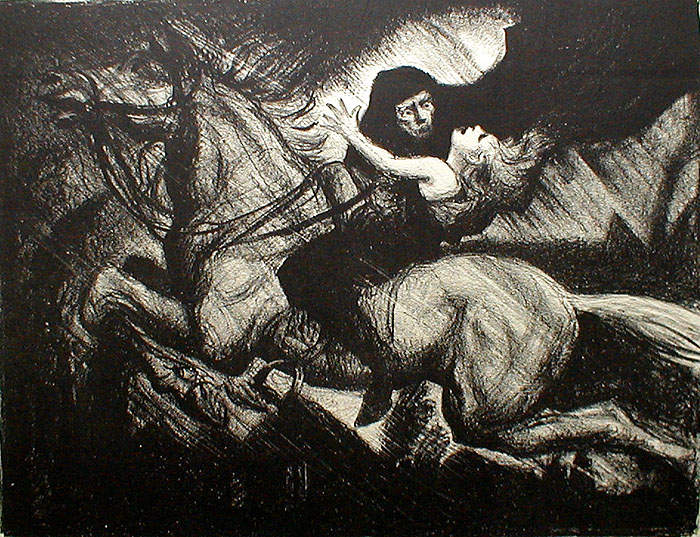
Illustration of Der Erlkönig (c. 1910) by Albert Sterner

Early modern English notions of elves became influential in eighteenth-century Germany. The Modern German Elf (m) and Elfe (f) was introduced as a loan-word from English in the 1740s and was prominent in Christoph Martin Wieland's 1764 translation of A Midsummer Night's Dream.

As German Romanticism got underway and writers started to seek authentic folklore, Jacob Grimm rejected Elf as a recent Anglicism, and promoted the reuse of the old form Elb (plural Elbe or Elben). In the same vein, Johann Gottfried Herder translated the Danish ballad Elveskud in his 1778 collection of folk songs, Stimmen der Völker in Liedern, as "Erlkönigs Tochter" ("The Erl-king's Daughter"; it appears that Herder introduced the term Erlkönig into German through a mis-Germanisation of the Danish word for elf). This in turn inspired Goethe's poem Der Erlkönig. However, Goethe added another new meaning, as the German word "Erle" does not mean "elf", but "black alder" - the poem about the Erlenkönig is set in the area of an alder quarry in the Saale valley in Thuringia. Goethe's poem then took on a life of its own, inspiring the Romantic concept of the Erlking, which was influential on literary images of elves from the nineteenth century on.

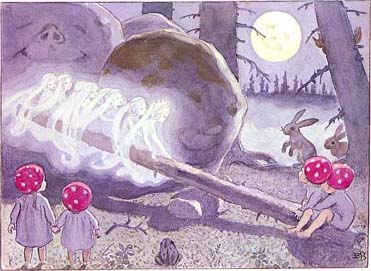
Little älvor, playing with Tomtebobarnen. From Children of the Forest (1910) by Swedish author and illustrator Elsa Beskow.

In Scandinavia too, in the nineteenth century, traditions of elves were adapted to include small, insect-winged fairies. These are often called "elves" (älvor in modern Swedish, alfer in Danish, álfar in Icelandic), although the more formal translation in Danish is feer. Thus, the alf found in the fairy tale The Elf of the Rose by Danish author Hans Christian Andersen is so tiny he can have a rose blossom for home, and "wings that reached from his shoulders to his feet". Yet Andersen also wrote about elvere in The Elfin Hill. The elves in this story are more alike those of traditional Danish folklore, who were beautiful females, living in hills and boulders, capable of dancing a man to death. Like the huldra in Norway and Sweden, they are hollow when seen from the back.

English and German literary traditions both influenced the British Victorian image of elves, which appeared in illustrations as tiny men and women with pointed ears and stocking caps. An example is Andrew Lang's fairy tale Princess Nobody (1884), illustrated by Richard Doyle, where fairies are tiny people with butterfly wings. In contrast, elves are small people with red stocking caps. These conceptions remained prominent in twentieth-century children's literature, for example Enid Blyton's The Faraway Tree series, and were influenced by German Romantic literature. Accordingly, in the Brothers Grimm fairy tale Die Wichtelmänner (literally, "the little men"), the title protagonists are two tiny naked men who help a shoemaker in his work. Even though Wichtelmänner are akin to beings such as kobolds, dwarves and brownies, the tale was translated into English by Margaret Hunt in 1884 as The Elves and the Shoemaker. This shows how the meanings of elf had changed and was in itself influential: the usage is echoed, for example, in the house-elf of J. K. Rowling's Harry Potter stories. In his turn, J. R. R. Tolkien recommended using the older German form Elb in translations of his works, as recorded in his "Guide to the Names in The Lord of the Rings" (1967). Elb, Elben was consequently introduced in 1972 German translation of The Lord of the Rings, repopularising the form in German.

== In popular culture ==
=== Christmas elf ===
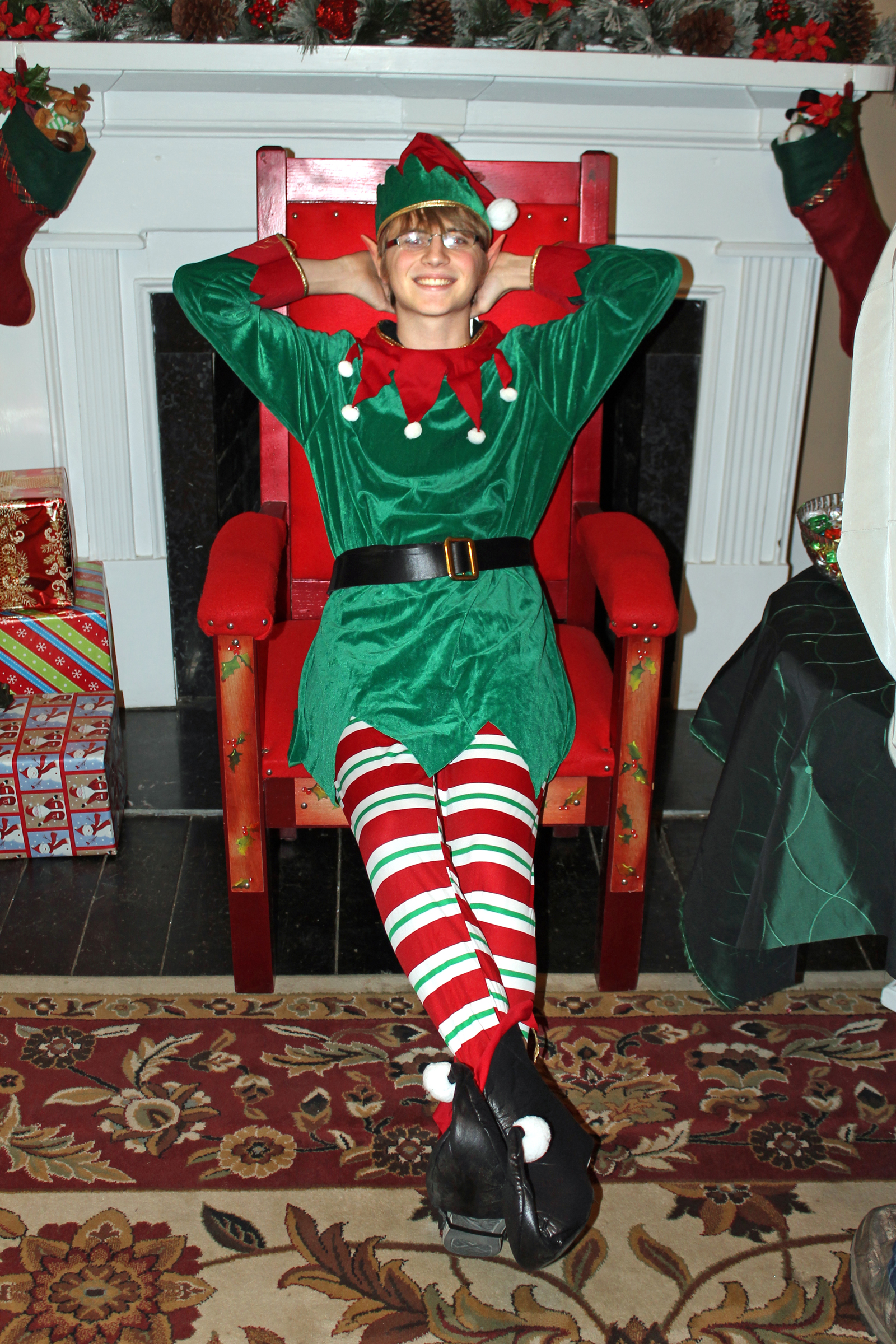
A person dressed as a Christmas Elf, Virginia, 2016

With industrialisation and mass education, traditional folklore about elves waned; however, as the phenomenon of popular culture emerged, elves were re-imagined, in large part based on Romantic literary depictions and associated medievalism.

As American Christmas traditions crystallized in the nineteenth century, the 1823 poem "A Visit from St. Nicholas" (widely known as "'Twas the Night before Christmas") characterized St Nicholas himself as "a right jolly old elf'. However, it was his little helpers, inspired partly by folktales like The Elves and the Shoemaker, who became known as "Santa's elves"; the processes through which this came about are not well-understood, but one key figure was a Christmas-related publication by the German-American cartoonist Thomas Nast. Thus in the US, Canada, UK, and Ireland, the modern children's folklore of Santa Claus typically includes small, nimble, green-clad elves with pointy ears, long noses, and pointy hats, as Santa's helpers. They make the toys in a workshop located in the North Pole. The role of elves as Santa's helpers has continued to be popular, as evidenced by the success of the popular Christmas movie Elf.

=== Fantasy fiction ===
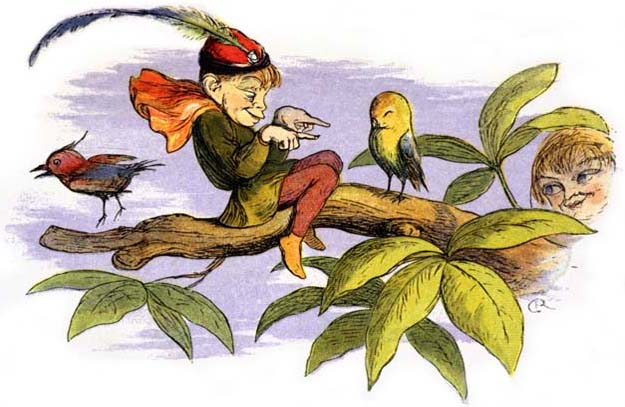
19th century illustration of an elf teasing a bird by Richard Doyle

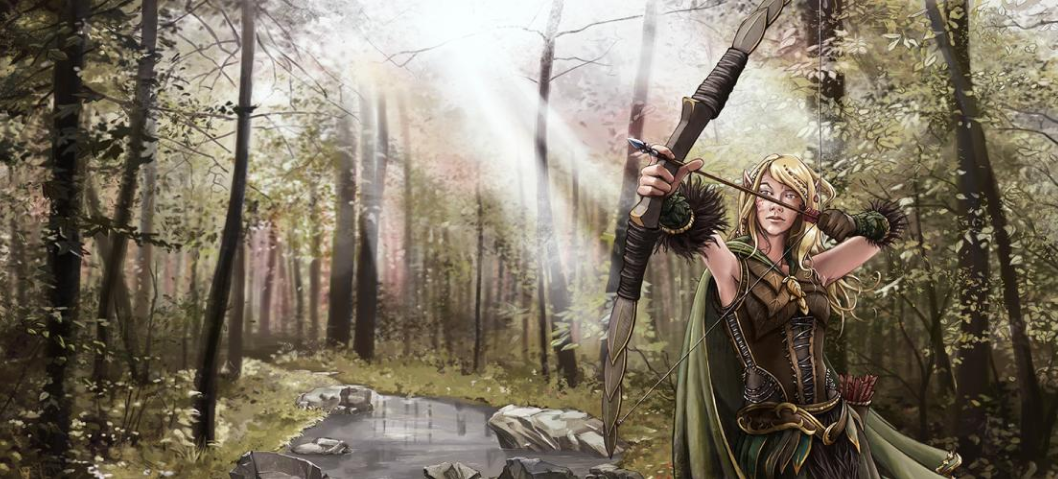
Illustration of a female elf in the high fantasy style. Kitty Polikeit, 2011

The fantasy genre in the twentieth century grew out of nineteenth-century Romanticism, in which nineteenth-century scholars such as Andrew Lang and the Grimm brothers collected fairy stories from folklore and in some cases retold them freely.

A pioneering work of the fantasy genre was The King of Elfland's Daughter, a 1924 novel by Lord Dunsany. The Elves of Middle-earth played a central role in Tolkien's legendarium, notably The Hobbit, The Lord of the Rings and The Silmarillion; this legendarium was enormously influential on subsequent fantasy writing. Tolkien's writing had such influence that in the 1960s and afterwards, elves speaking an elvish language similar to those in Tolkien's novels became staple non-human characters in high fantasy works and in fantasy role-playing games. Post-Tolkien fantasy elves (which feature not only in novels but also in role-playing games such as Dungeons & Dragons) are often portrayed as being wiser and more beautiful than humans, with sharper senses and perceptions as well. They are said to be gifted in magic, mentally sharp and lovers of nature, art, and song. They are often skilled archers. A hallmark of many fantasy elves is their pointed ears.

In works where elves are the main characters, such as The Silmarillion or Wendy and Richard Pini's comic book series Elfquest, elves exhibit a similar range of behaviour to a human cast, distinguished largely by their superhuman physical powers. However, where narratives are more human-centered, as in The Lord of the Rings, elves tend to sustain their role as powerful, sometimes threatening, outsiders. Despite the obvious fictionality of fantasy novels and games, scholars have found that elves in these works continue to have a subtle role in shaping the real-life identities of their audiences. For example, elves can function to encode real-world racial others in video games, or to influence gender norms through literature.

== Equivalents in non-Germanic traditions ==
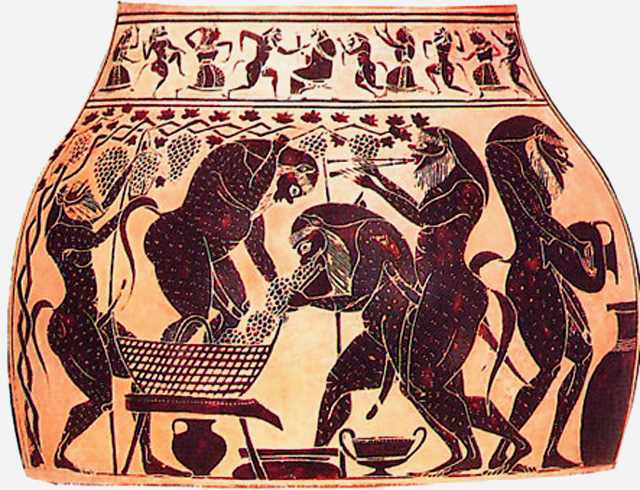
Greek black-figure vase painting depicting dancing satyrs. A propensity for dancing and making mischief in the woods is among the traits satyrs and elves have in common.

Beliefs in humanlike supernatural beings are widespread in human cultures, and many such beings may be referred to as elves in English.

=== Europe ===
Elfish beings appear to have been a common characteristic within Indo-European mythologies. In the Celtic-speaking regions of north-west Europe, the beings most similar to elves are generally referred to with the Gaelic term Aos Sí. The equivalent term in modern Welsh is Tylwyth Teg. In the Romance-speaking world, beings comparable to elves are widely known by words derived from Latin fata ('fate'), which came into English as fairy. This word became partly synonymous with elf by the early modern period. Other names also abound, however, such as the Sicilian Donas de fuera ('ladies from outside'), or French bonnes dames ('good ladies'). In the Finnic-speaking world, the term usually thought most closely equivalent to elf is haltija (in Finnish) or haldaja (Estonian). Meanwhile, an example of an equivalent in the Slavic-speaking world is the vila (plural vile) of Serbo-Croatian (and, partly, Slovene) folklore. Elves bear some resemblances to the satyrs of Greek mythology, who were also regarded as woodland-dwelling mischief-makers.

In the Italian region of Romagna, the mazapégul are mischievous nocturnal elves who disrupt sleep and torment beautiful young girls.

=== Asia and Oceania ===
Some scholarship draws parallels between the Arabian tradition of jinn with the elves of medieval Germanic-language cultures. Some of the comparisons are quite precise: for example, the root of the word jinn was used in medieval Arabic terms for madness and possession in similar ways to the Old English word ylfig, which was derived from elf and also denoted prophetic states of mind implicitly associated with elfish possession.

Khmer culture in Cambodia includes the Mrenh kongveal, elfish beings associated with guarding animals.

In the Philippines, elves are collectively known as Engkanto but are known by various names across different native languages. They are believed to inhabit large trees like the dalakit and kalumpang, which are thought to be their mansions. Filipinos respect these beings, seeking permission before picking fruit or cutting trees. Elves can cause mischief, such as throwing dust into trespassers’ eyes or causing illness. Some, like the kiba-an, steal hair or food but can be warded off through rituals. Legends tell of tall, fair-skinned dalakitnon elves who blend with humans. Engkanto are mystical spirits in Filipino folklore that can take human or animal form. They are linked to ancestors, nature spirits, and mythical beings like elves and sirens. The term comes from the Spanish encanto (enchantment), used to describe the diverse supernatural entities in the Philippines. Some Engkanto live independently and interact with humans, even becoming spirit guides (abyan). They can befriend or harm people—bringing luck, madness, or illness. They are believed to dwell in nature, especially large trees like the balete, and sometimes take humans as lovers, leading to legends of unusual births. Engkanto vary in appearance, with some being strikingly beautiful, having fair skin, blue eyes, or golden hair, while others appear eerie or monstrous. Some, like the itim na engkanto, are malevolent and stalk humans. They can lead travelers astray, cause fevers, or even abduct people. To ward them off, Filipinos carry protective charms called anting-anting or agimat. In the animistic precolonial beliefs of the Philippines, the world can be divided into the material world and the spirit world. All objects, animate or inanimate, have a spirit called (diwa). Non-human diwa are known as diwata, usually euphemistically referred to as dili ingon nato ('those unlike us'). They inhabit natural features like mountains, forests, old trees, caves, reefs, etc., as well as personify abstract concepts and natural phenomena. They are similar to elves in that they can be helpful or hateful but are usually indifferent to mortals. They can be mischievous and cause unintentional harm to humans, but they can also deliberately cause illnesses and misfortunes when disrespected or angered. Spanish colonizers equated them with elves and fairy folklore.

Orang bunian are supernatural beings in Malaysian, Bruneian and Indonesian folklore, invisible to most humans except those with spiritual sight. While the term is often translated as "elves", it literally translates to "hidden people" or "whistling people". Their appearance is nearly identical to humans dressed in an ancient Southeast Asian style.

In Māori culture, Patupaiarehe are beings similar to European elves and fairies.

== Relationship with reality ==
=== Reality and perception ===
Elves have in many times and places been believed to be real beings. Where enough people have believed in the reality of elves that those beliefs then had real effects in the world, they can be understood as part of people's worldview, and as a social reality: a thing which, like the exchange value of a dollar bill or the sense of pride stirred up by a national flag, is real because of people's beliefs rather than as an objective reality. Accordingly, beliefs about elves and their social functions have varied over time and space. Even in the twenty-first century, fantasy stories about elves have been argued both to reflect and to shape their audiences' understanding of the real world. Over time, people have attempted to demythologise or rationalise beliefs in elves in various ways.

=== Integration into Christian cosmologies ===
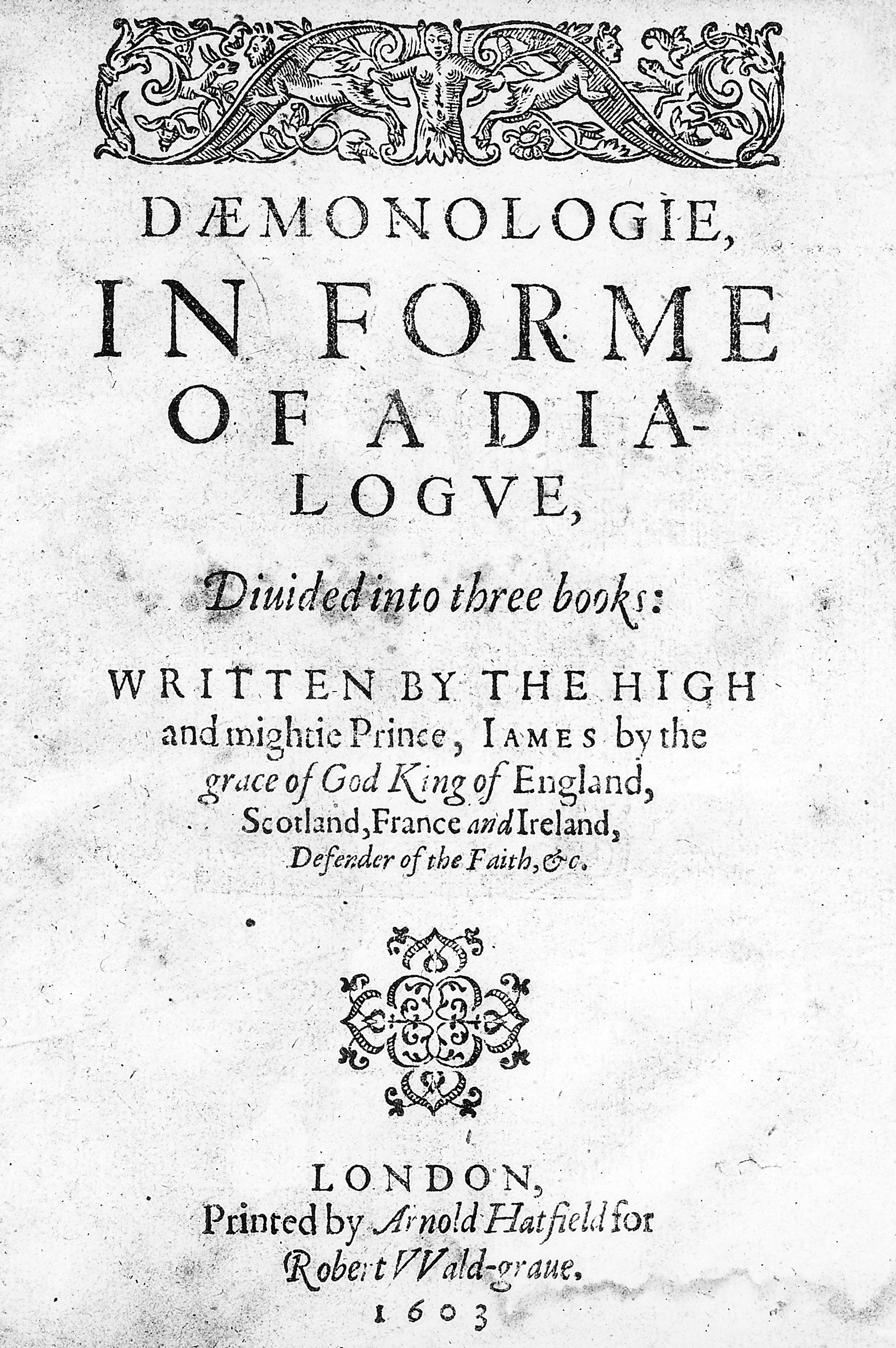
Title page of Daemonologie by James VI and I. It tried to explain traditional Scottish beliefs in terms of Christian scholarship.

Beliefs about elves have their origins before the conversion to Christianity and associated Christianization of northwest Europe. For this reason, belief in elves has, from the Middle Ages through into recent scholarship, often been labelled "pagan" and a "superstition'. However, almost all surviving textual sources about elves were produced by Christians (whether Anglo-Saxon monks, medieval Icelandic poets, early modern ballad-singers, nineteenth-century folklore collectors, or even twentieth-century fantasy authors). Attested beliefs about elves, therefore, need to be understood as part of Germanic-speakers' Christian culture and not merely a relic of their pre-Christian religion. Accordingly, investigating the relationship between beliefs in elves and Christian cosmology has been a preoccupation of scholarship about elves both in early times and modern research.

Historically, people have taken three main approaches to integrate elves into Christian cosmology, all of which are found widely across time and space:

- Identifying elves with the demons of Judaeo-Christian-Mediterranean tradition. For example:
  - In English-language material: in the Royal Prayer Book from c. 900, elf appears as a gloss for "Satan". In the late-fourteenth-century Wife of Bath's Tale, Geoffrey Chaucer equates male elves with incubi (demons which rape sleeping women). In the early modern Scottish witchcraft trials, witnesses' descriptions of encounters with elves were often interpreted by prosecutors as encounters with the Devil.
  - In medieval Iceland, Snorri Sturluson wrote in his Prose Edda of ljósálfar and dökkálfar ('light-elves and dark-elves'), the ljósálfar living in the heavens and the dökkálfar under the earth. The consensus of modern scholarship is that Snorri's elves are based on angels and demons of Christian cosmology.
  - Elves appear as demonic forces widely in medieval and early modern English, German, and Scandinavian prayers.
- Viewing elves as being more or less like people and more or less outside Christian cosmology. The Icelanders who copied the Poetic Edda did not explicitly try to integrate elves into Christian thought. Likewise, the early modern Scottish people who confessed to encountering elves seem not to have thought of themselves as having dealings with the Devil. Nineteenth-century Icelandic folklore about elves mostly presents them as a human agricultural community parallel to the visible human community, which may or may not be Christian. It is possible that stories were sometimes told from this perspective as a political act, to subvert the dominance of the Church.
- Integrating elves into Christian cosmology without identifying them as demons. The most striking examples are serious theological treatises: the Icelandic Tíðfordrif (1644) by Jón Guðmundsson lærði or, in Scotland, Robert Kirk's Secret Commonwealth of Elves, Fauns, and Fairies (1691). This approach also appears in the Old English poem Beowulf, which lists elves among the races springing from Cain's murder of Abel. The late thirteenth-century South English Legendary and some Icelandic folktales explain elves as angels that sided neither with Lucifer nor with God and were banished by God to earth rather than hell. One famous Icelandic folktale explains elves as the lost children of Eve.

=== Demythologising elves as indigenous peoples ===
Some nineteenth- and twentieth-century scholars attempted to rationalise beliefs in elves as folk memories of lost indigenous peoples. Since belief in supernatural beings is ubiquitous in human cultures, scholars no longer believe such explanations are valid. Research has shown, however, that stories about elves have often been used as a way for people to think metaphorically about real-life ethnic others.

=== Demythologising elves as people with illness or disability ===
Scholars have at times also tried to explain beliefs in elves as being inspired by people suffering certain kinds of illnesses (such as Williams syndrome). Elves were certainly often seen as a cause of illness, and indeed the English word oaf seems to have originated as a form of elf: the word elf came to mean 'changeling left by an elf' and then, because changelings were noted for their failure to thrive, to its modern sense 'a fool, a stupid person; a large, clumsy man or boy'. However, it again seems unlikely that the origin of beliefs in elves itself is to be explained by people's encounters with objectively real people affected by disease.

== See also ==
- Svartálfar
- Dökkálfar and Ljósálfar
- Twilight of the Godlings
