= Hafstein =

Hafstein is a surname. Notable people with the surname include:

- Hannes Hafstein (1861–1922), Icelandic politician and poet
- Jóhann Hafstein (1915–1980), Icelandic politician and Prime Minister of Iceland
- Stefán Jón Hafstein (born 1955), Icelandic politician
- Valdimar Tr. Hafstein (born 1972), Icelandic folklorist and ethnologist
