= Thunderstone (folklore) =

Prehistoric stone tool used as an amulet

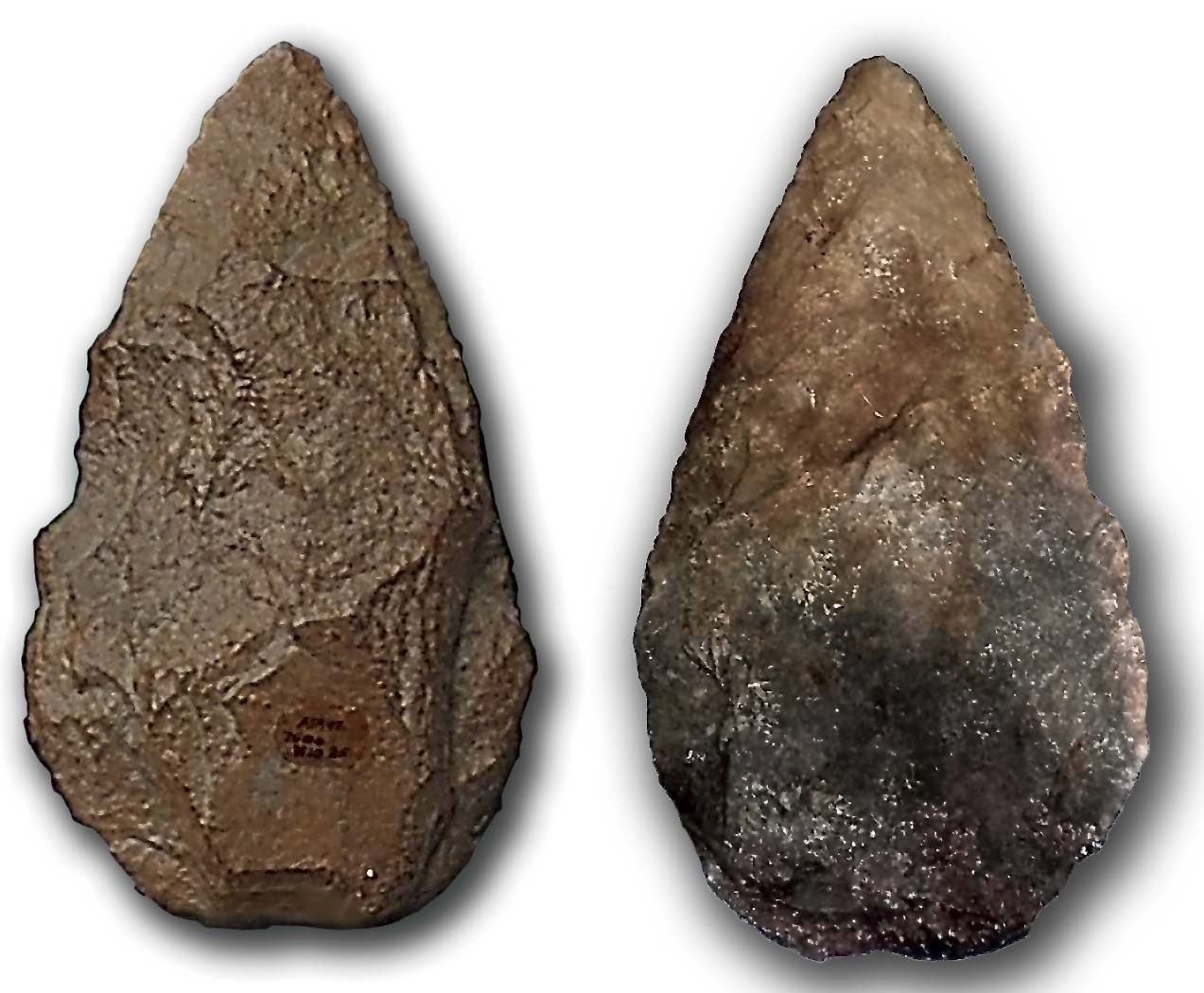
Two Lower Paleolithic bifaces

A thunderstone is a prehistoric hand axe, stone tool, or fossil which was later used as an amulet to protect a person or a building. The name derives from the ancient belief that the object was found at a place where lightning had struck. They were also called ceraunia (a Latin word, derived from the Greek word κεραυνός, both of which mean 'thunderbolt').

== Thunderstone folklore ==
=== European tradition ===
Albanians believed in the supreme powers of thunderstones (kokrra e rrufesë or guri i rejës), which were believed to be formed during lightning strikes and to fall from the sky. Thunderstones were preserved in family life as important cult objects. It was believed that bringing them inside the house would bring good fortune, prosperity, and progress to people, especially in livestock and agriculture, or that rifle bullets would not hit the owners of thunderstones. Thunderstone pendants were believed to have protective powers against the negative effects of the evil eye and were used as talismans for both cattle and pregnant women.

==== Classical world ====
The Greeks and Romans, at least from the Hellenistic period onward, used Neolithic stone axeheads for the apotropaic protection of buildings. A 1985 survey of the use of prehistoric axes in Romano-British contexts found forty examples, of which twenty-nine were associated with buildings including villas, military structures such as barracks, temples, and kilns.

==== Middle Ages ====
During the Middle Ages many of these well-wrought stones were venerated as weapons, which during the "war in heaven" had been used in driving forth Satan and his hosts. Hence, in the 11th century the Byzantine emperor sent to the Holy Roman emperor a "heaven axe"; and in the 12th century, a Bishop of Rennes asserted the value of thunderstones as a divinely appointed means of securing success in battle, safety on the sea, security against thunder, and immunity from unpleasant dreams.

==== European folklore ====
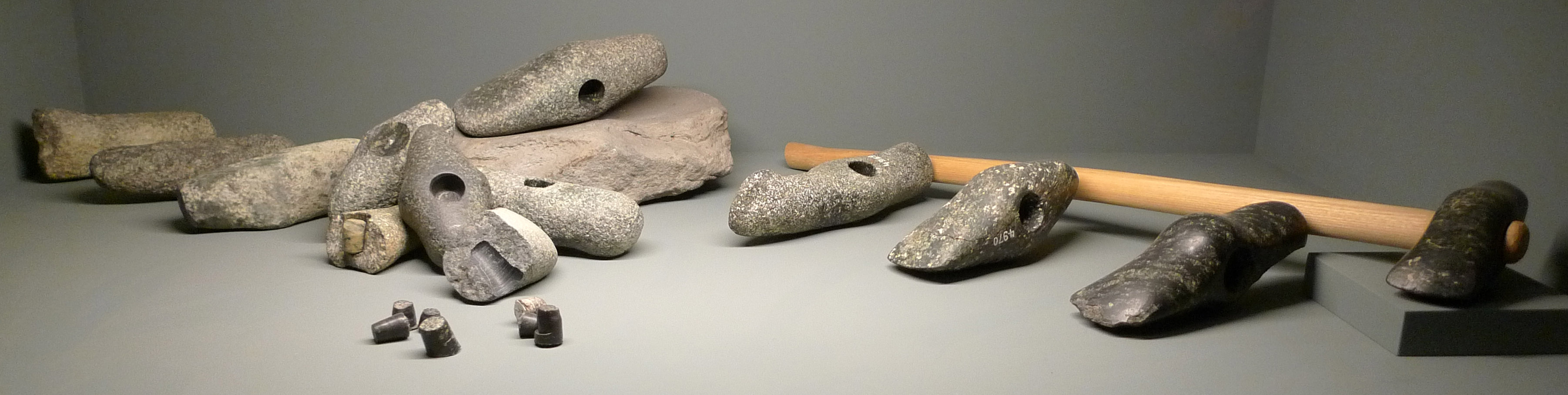
Axe heads found at a 2700 BC Neolithic manufacture site in Switzerland, arranged in the various stages of production from left to right.

In Scandinavia thunderstones were frequently worshiped as family gods who kept off spells and witchcraft. Beer was poured over them as an offering, and they were sometimes anointed with butter. In Switzerland the owner of a thunderstone whirls it, on the end of a thong, three times around his head, and throws it at the door of his dwelling at the approach of a storm to prevent lightning from striking the house. In Italy they are hung around children's necks to protect them from illness and to ward off the Evil eye. In Roman times, they were sewn inside dog collars along with a little piece of coral to keep the dogs from going mad. In Sweden they offer protection from elves. Up until the 19th century it was common practice in Limburg to sew thunderstones into cloth bags and carried over the chest, in the belief that it would soothe stomach ailments. In some parts of Spain for example the province of Salamanca it was believed that by rubbing the thunderstones on the joints it would help prevent rheumatic diseases. In the French Alps they protect sheep, while elsewhere in France they are thought to ease childbirth. Among the Slavs they cure warts on man and beast, and during Passion Week they have the property to reveal hidden treasure.

=== Asian tradition ===
In Burma they are used as a cure and preventative for appendicitis. In Japan they cure boils and ulcers. In Malaysia and Sumatra they are used to sharpen the kris, are considered very lucky objects, and have been credited with being touchstones for gold.

=== North American tradition ===
In North Carolina and Alabama there is a belief that flint stones placed in the fire will keep hawks from molesting the chickens, a belief which probably stems from the European idea that elf arrows protects domestic animals. In Brazil, flint is used as a divining stone for gold, treasure and water.

==== Native American folklore ====
The flint was an object of veneration by most American Indian tribes. According to the Pawnee origin myth, stone weapons and implements were given to man by the Morning Star. Among the K'iche' people of Guatemala, there is a myth that a flint fell from the sky and broke into 1600 pieces, each of which became a god. Tohil, the god who gave them fire, is still represented as flint. This myth provides a parallel to the almost universal belief in the thunderstone, and is reminiscent of how the Roman god Jupiter was worshipped in the form of a flint stone. The Cherokee shaman invokes a flint when he is about to scarify a patient prior to applying his medicine. Among the Pueblos there were flint societies which, in most tribes, were primarily concerned with weather and witchcraft, but sometimes had to do with war and medicine.

== Fossils as thunderstones ==
In many parts of southern England until the middle of the 19th century, another name commonly used for fossils echinoid was 'thunderstone', though other fossils such as belemnites and (rarely) ammonites were also used for this purpose.

In 1677 Robert Plot, the first keeper of the Ashmolean Museum in Oxford, published his classic book The Natural History of Oxfordshire. Plot recorded that in Oxfordshire what are now known as fossil echinoids were called thunderstones, as they were thought to have descended from the heavens during a thunderstorm. St. Peter's Church in Linkenholt, England, was built in 1871 near the location of the old St. Peter's, which had stood for nearly 700 years. The 1871 version of the church included fossil echinoids built into the walls surrounding the windows, a style adopted from the original. This implies that thunderstone folklore was retained for at least 700 years in England, and had its roots in pagan folklore.

In Sussex in the early 20th century fossil echinoids were also used on the outside windowsills of kitchens and dairies to stop milk going off (because thunder was believed to be able to sour milk).

== Decline of thunderstone mythology ==
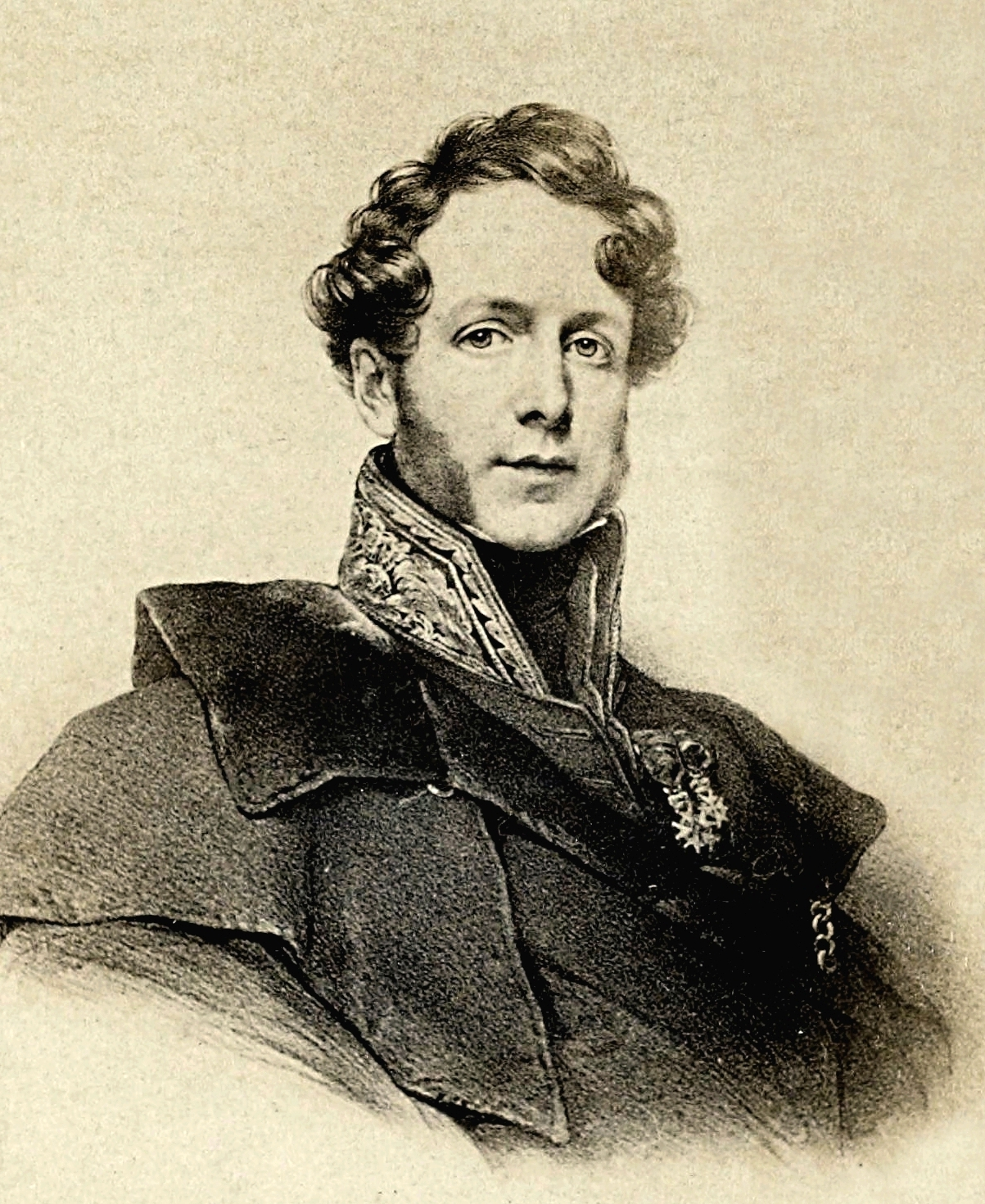
Boucher de Perthes

Even as late as the 17th century, a French ambassador brought a stone hatchet, which still exists in the museum at Nancy, as a present to the Prince-Bishop of Verdun, and claimed that it had healing properties.

Andrew Dickson White described the discovery of the true origin of thunderstones as a "line of observation and thought ... fatal to the theological view". In the last years of the 16th century Michael Mercati tried to prove that the "thunder-stones" were weapons or implements of early races of men; but for some reason his book was not published until the beginning of the 18th century, when other thinkers had begun to take up the same idea.

"In 1723 Antoine de Jussieu addressed the French Academy on 'The Origin and Uses of Thunder-stones'. He showed that recent travelers from various parts of the world had brought a number of weapons and other implements of stone to France, and that they were essentially similar to what in Europe had been known as "thunderstones". A year later this fact was firmly embedded in the minds of French scientists by the Jesuit Joseph-Francois Lafitau, who published a work showing the similarity between the customs of aborigines then existing in other lands and those of the early inhabitants of Europe. So began, in these works of Jussieu and Lafitau, the science of ethnography." page 267

It was only after the French Revolution of 1830, more than a century later, that the political climate in Europe was free enough of religious sentiment for archaeological discoveries to be dispassionately investigated and the conclusion reached that human existence spanned a much greater period of time than any Christian theologian had dreamed of.

=== Boucher de Perthes ===
In 1847, a man previously unknown to the world at large, Boucher de Perthes, published in Paris the first volume of work on Celtic and Antediluvian Antiquities, and in this he showed engravings of typical flint implements and weapons, of which he had discovered thousands upon thousands in the high drift beds near Abbeville, in northern France. So far as France was concerned, he was met at first by what he calls "a conspiracy of silence", and then by a contemptuous opposition among orthodox scientists, led by Elie de Beaumont.

In 1863 the thunderstone myth was further discredited by Charles Lyell in his book Geological Evidences of the Antiquity of Man. Lyell had previously opposed the new ideas about human antiquity, and his changing sides gave further force to the scientific evidence.

== See also ==
- Elfshot
- Elf-arrow
- Projectile point
- Arrowhead
- Stone tool
- *Perkʷūnos
