= Elfshot =

Medical condition described in Anglo-Saxon texts

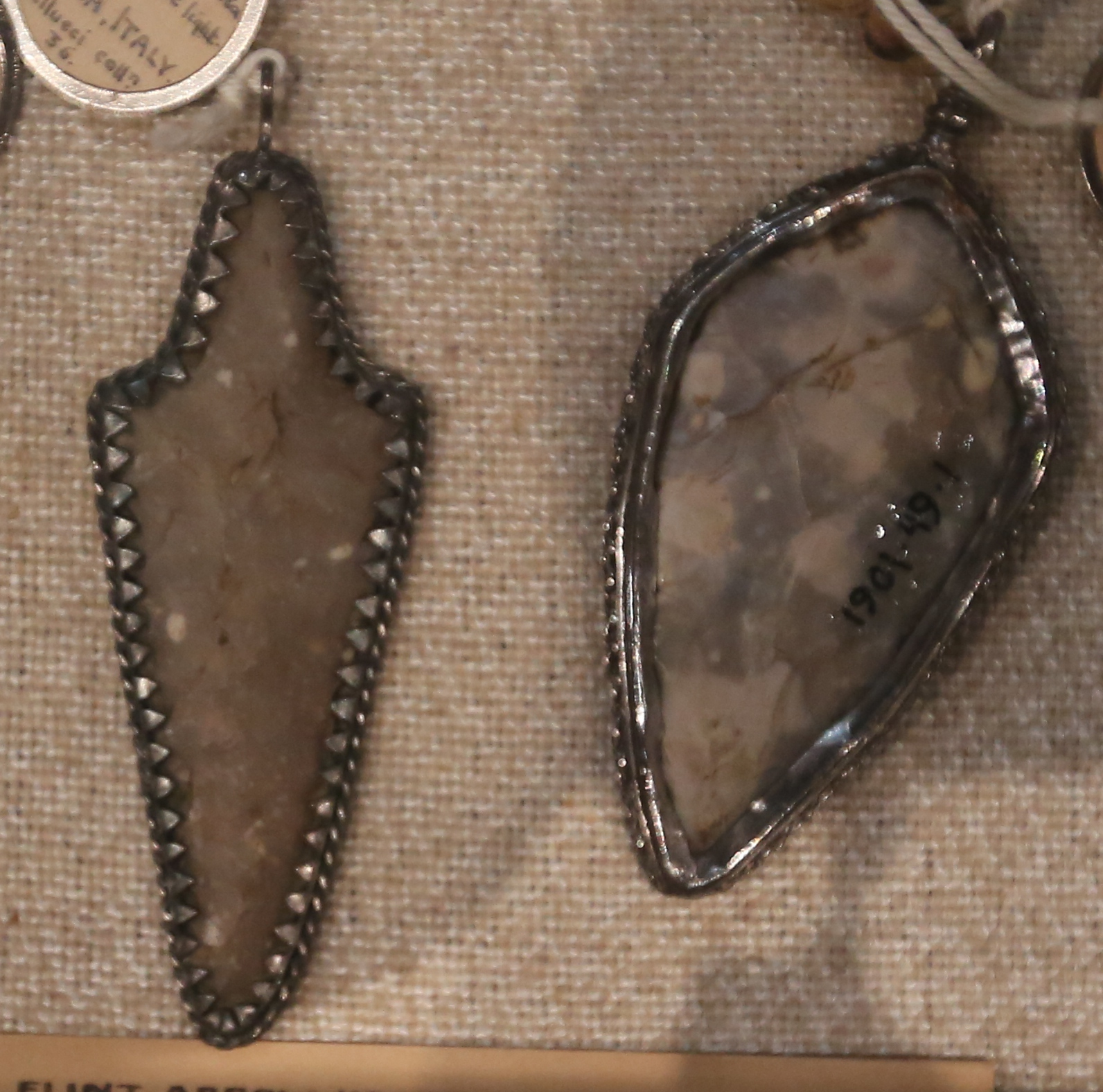
A pair of prehistoric flint arrowheads, set in silver and used as amulets. Such arrowheads were associated in folklore with elves, and referred to as "elf arrows".

Elfshot or elf-shot is a medical condition described in the Anglo-Saxon medical text Wið færstice that may have been believed to be caused by elves shooting invisible elf-arrows at a person or animal (most often cattle), causing sudden shooting pains localized to a particular area of the body. Modern diagnoses might include rheumatism, arthritis, muscle stitches or cramps.

The term "elf-shot" is variously understood and used across different contexts. It has been interpreted as referring not only to disease caused by elves using projectiles but also to witchcraft involving projectiles without elves or fairies. Additionally, it can denote prehistoric arrowheads believed to be used by fairies or witches to cause harm or serve as protective amulets. Consequently, scholarship on elf-shot has been marked by significant confusion, with different sources applying divergent definitions and missing connections between them.

== Origins and background ==
Before the causes of certain diseases or ailments were scientifically evidenced, they were often attributed to supernatural phenomena, and in such cases often seen as the malevolent actions of supernatural beings. It has been argued that attributing certain aches and pains to the arrows or "flying venom" of elfkind was a practice common throughout Anglo-Saxon and Scandinavian Europe.

The Old English spell Gif hors ofscoten sie, "if a horse is elf-shot," meaning some kind of internal injury, may be an allusion to the magical elf-shot. However, the term aelfsogoða, which describes the internal pain from jaundice or a disorder of bile, is perhaps a more suitable fit. Along with elves, there also exist historical claims of witches firing elf-arrows. Per the testimony of Scottish accused witch Isobel Gowdie, these elf-arrows were given to witches by the Devil, who asked them to be fired (by flicking with the thumb, rather than shot with a bow) in his name.

Belief in, or mentions of, elf-shot persisted into the 20th century in Scotland, though more modern elves seem to have concentrated their attentions on animals.

== Preventive and curative practices ==
There is evidence of belief that elfshot could function as both cause and cure of pain, with the added possibility of elfshot charms being used for exorcism. This was associated with the use of prehistoric flint arrowheads.

Possible prevention or curing of elf-shot included visiting Church on the first Sunday of the season, or using a charm made of feverfew, red nettles, and waybread. All have vaguely spear-shaped leaves, which, by the Law of Similarity, may have suggested their use as a remedy for pains attributed to elf-arrows.

The Anglo-Saxons were known to have various charms and preventative practices for horses and cattle that have been elf-shot. When dealing with cattle, a sewing-needle folded into a page torn from a psalm-book, and placed into the beast's hair, was an option as well. Various cures for elfshot horses have been recorded, including mixing dock seed, Irish wax, and holy water and letting "a priest sing twelve masses over them".

== Elf-arrows and artefacts ==
Neolithic and Bronze Age flint arrowheads were recorded as being collected and used for folk magic and folk medicine practices. These arrow heads were interpreted as fairy darts, the cause and cure of certain of illnesses. The name elf arrows derives from the folklore belief that the arrows fell from the sky, and were used by the elves to kill cattle and inflict elf-shot on human beings.

Elf-arrows were sometimes worn as amulets, occasionally set in silver, as a charm against witchcraft.

== See also ==
- Fairy riding – paralysis in livestock, attributed to fairies
- Projectile point – component of any projectile weapon, including arrows and spears
- Thunderstone (folklore) – flint arrowheads once thought to have fallen from the sky
