= Arrowhead =

Sharpened tip of an arrow

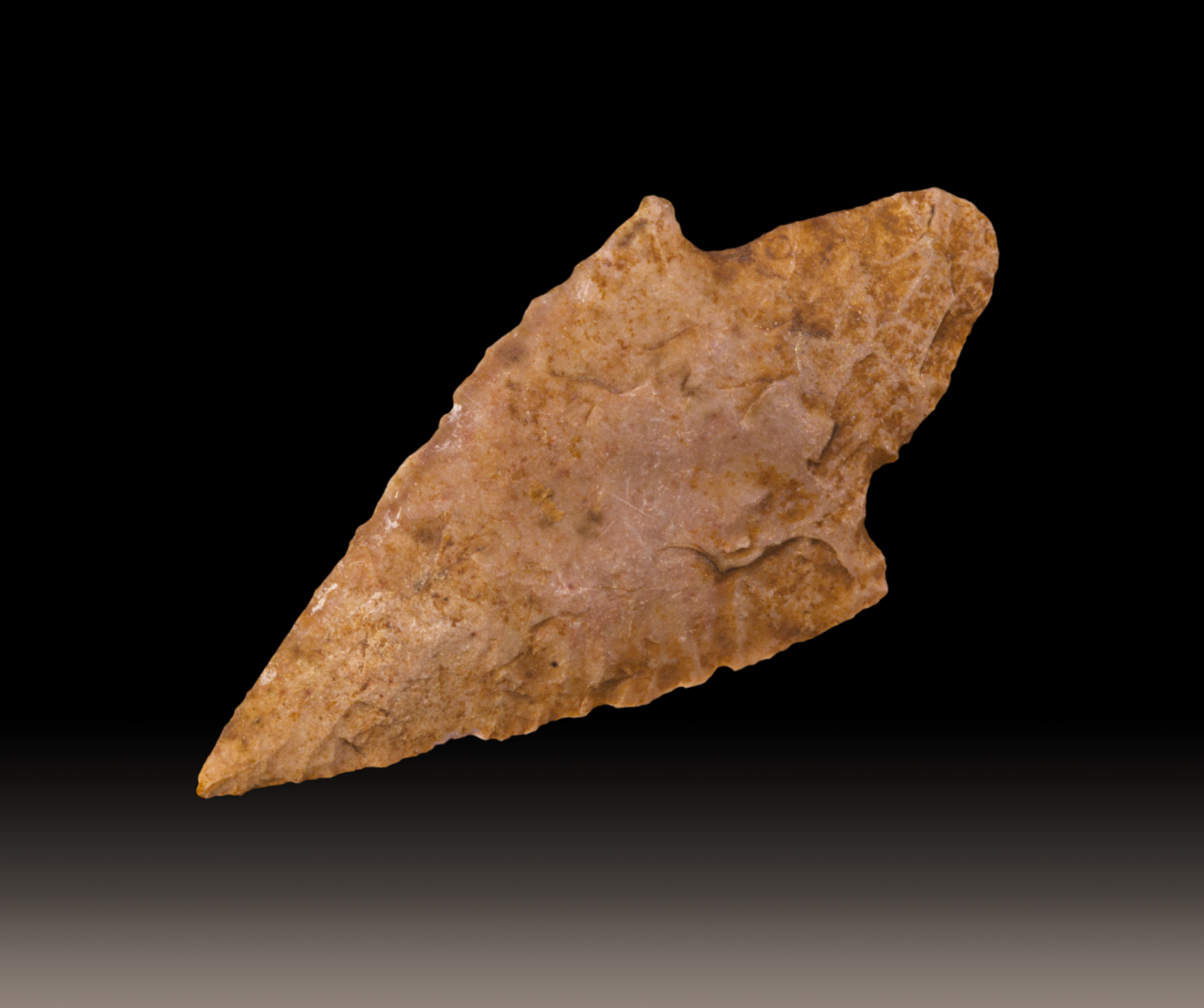
Chert arrowhead, Late Neolithic (Rhodézien) (3300–2400 BC), current France

An arrowhead or point is the usually sharpened and hardened tip of an arrow, which contributes a majority of the projectile mass and is responsible for impacting and penetrating a target, or sometimes for special purposes such as signaling.

The earliest arrowheads were made of stone and of organic materials; as human civilizations progressed, other alloy materials were used. Arrowheads are important archaeological artifacts; they are a subclass of projectile points. Modern enthusiasts still "produce over one million brand-new spear and arrow points per year".

A craftsman who manufactures arrowheads is called an arrowsmith.

== History ==
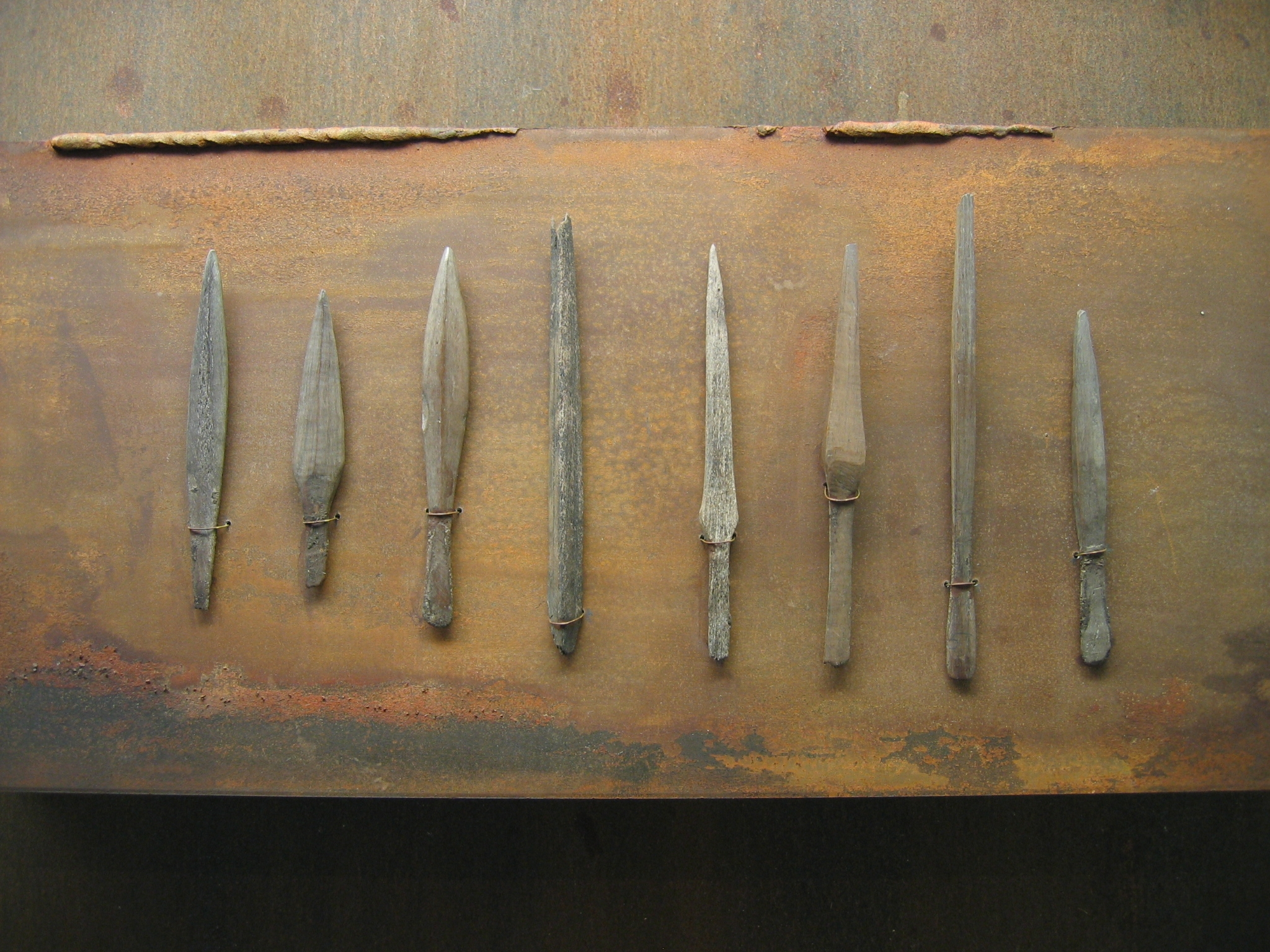
Arrowheads made of bone and antler found in Nydam Mose (3rd–5th century)

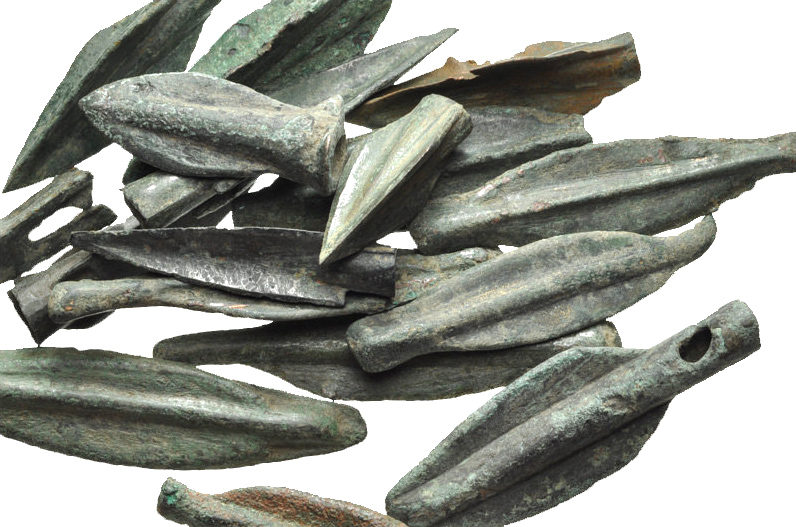
Ancient Greek bronze leaf-shaped, trefoil and triangular arrowheads

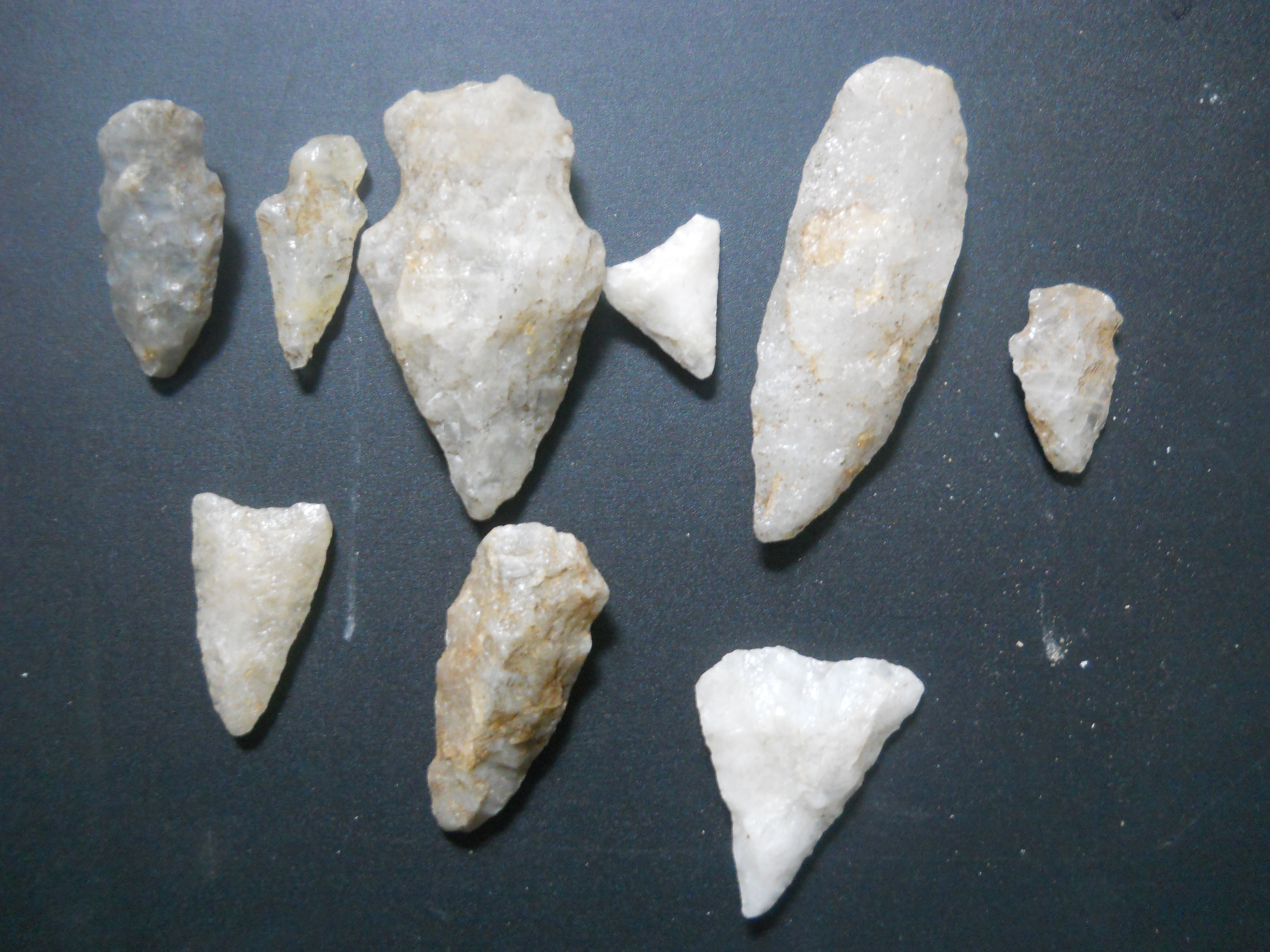
Some arrowheads made of quartz

In the Stone Age, people used sharpened bone, flintknapped stones, flakes, and chips and bits of rock as weapons and tools. Such items remained in use throughout human civilization, with new materials used as time passed. As archaeological artifacts such objects are classed as projectile points, without specifying whether they were projected by a bow or by some other means such as throwing since the specific means of projection (the bow, the arrow shaft, the spear shaft, etc.) is found too seldom in direct association with any given point and the word "arrow" would imply a certainty about these points which simply does not exist.

Such artifacts can be found all over the world in various locations. Those that have survived are usually made of stone, primarily consisting of flint, obsidian, or chert. In many excavations, bone, wooden, and metal arrowheads have also been found.

The oldest known arrowheads likely date to 74,000 years ago in Ethiopia. Stone projectile points from 64,000 years were excavated in Sibudu Cave, South Africa. In these points, examinations found traces of blood and bone residues, and glue made from a plant-based resin that was used to fasten them on to a wooden shaft. This indicated "cognitively demanding behavior" required to manufacture glue.

These hafted points might have been launched from bows. While "most attributes such as micro-residue distribution patterns and micro-wear will develop similarly on points used to tip spears, darts or arrows" and "explicit tests for distinctions between thrown spears and projected arrows have not yet been conducted" the researchers find "contextual support" for the use of these points on arrows: a broad range of animals was hunted, with an emphasis on taxa that prefer closed forested niches, including fast moving, terrestrial and arboreal animals. This is an argument for the use of traps, perhaps including snares. If snares were used, the use of cords and knots which would also have been adequate for the production of bows is implied. The employment of snares also demonstrates a practical understanding of the latent energy stored in bent branches, the main principle of bow construction. Cords and knots are implied by use-wear facets on perforated shell beads around 72,000 years old from Blombos. Archeologists in Louisiana have discovered that early Native Americans used Alligator gar scales as arrow heads.

"Hunting with a bow and arrow requires intricate multi-staged planning, material collection and tool preparation and implies a range of innovative social and communication skills."

== Design ==
Arrowheads are attached to arrow shafts to be shot from a bow; similar types of projectile points may be attached to a spear and "thrown" by means of an atlatl (spear thrower).

The arrowhead or projectile point is the primary functional part of the arrow, and plays the largest role in determining its purpose. Some arrows may simply use a sharpened tip of the solid shaft, but it is far more common for separate arrowheads to be made, usually from metal, horn, rock, or some other hard material.

Arrowheads may be attached to the shaft with a cap, a socket tang, or inserted into a split in the shaft and held by a process called hafting. Points attached with caps are simply slid snugly over the end of the shaft, or may be held on with hot glue. In medieval Europe, arrowheads were adhered with hide glue. Split-shaft construction involves splitting the arrow shaft lengthwise, inserting the arrowhead, and securing it using ferrule, sinew, rope, or wire.

Modern arrowheads used for hunting come in a variety of classes and styles. Many traditionalist archers choose heads made of modern high-carbon steel that closely resemble traditional stone heads (see Variants). Other classes of broadheads referred to as "mechanical" and "hybrid" are gaining popularity. Often, these heads rely on force created by passing through an animal to expand or open.

== Variants ==
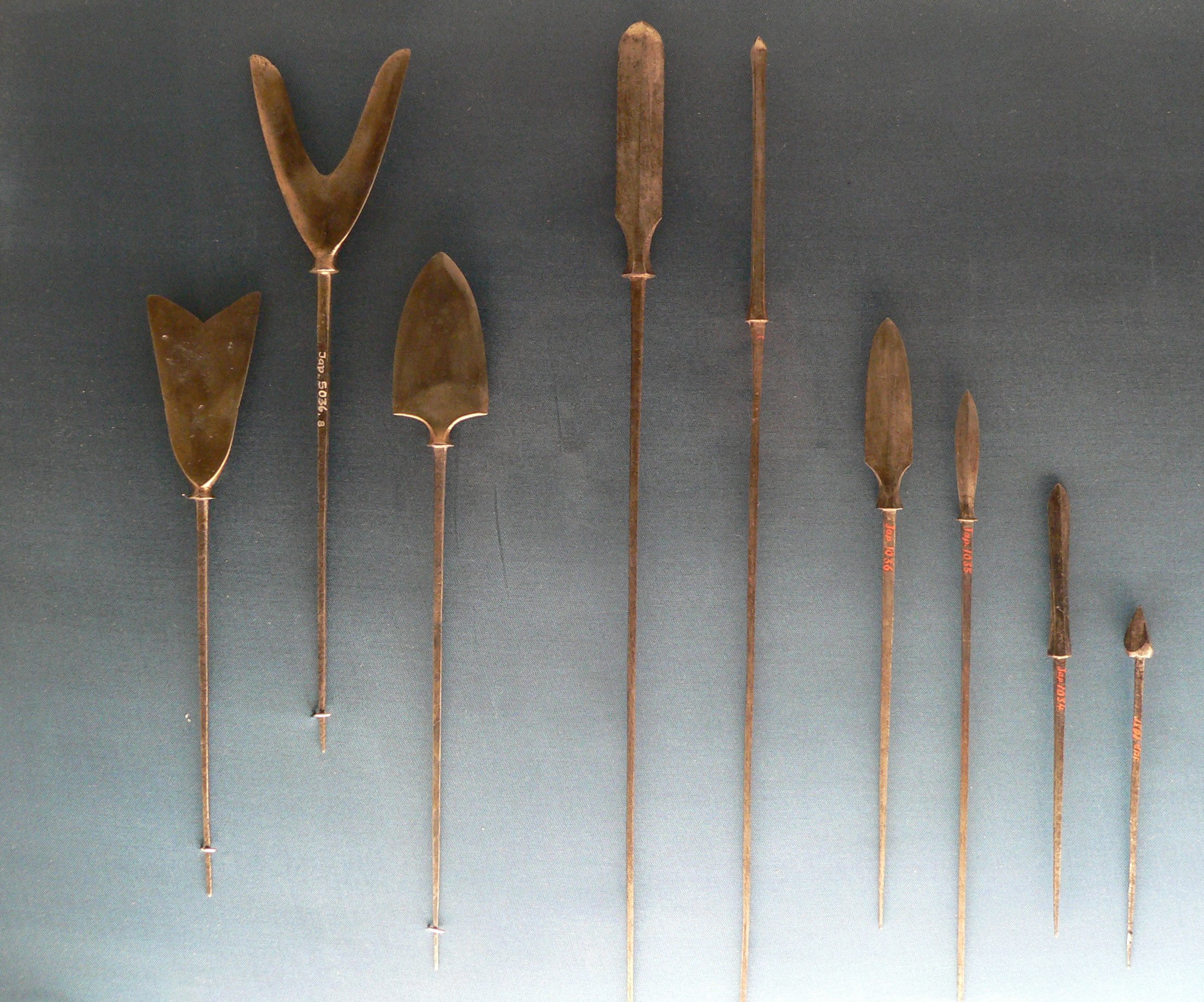
Japanese arrowheads of several shapes and functions

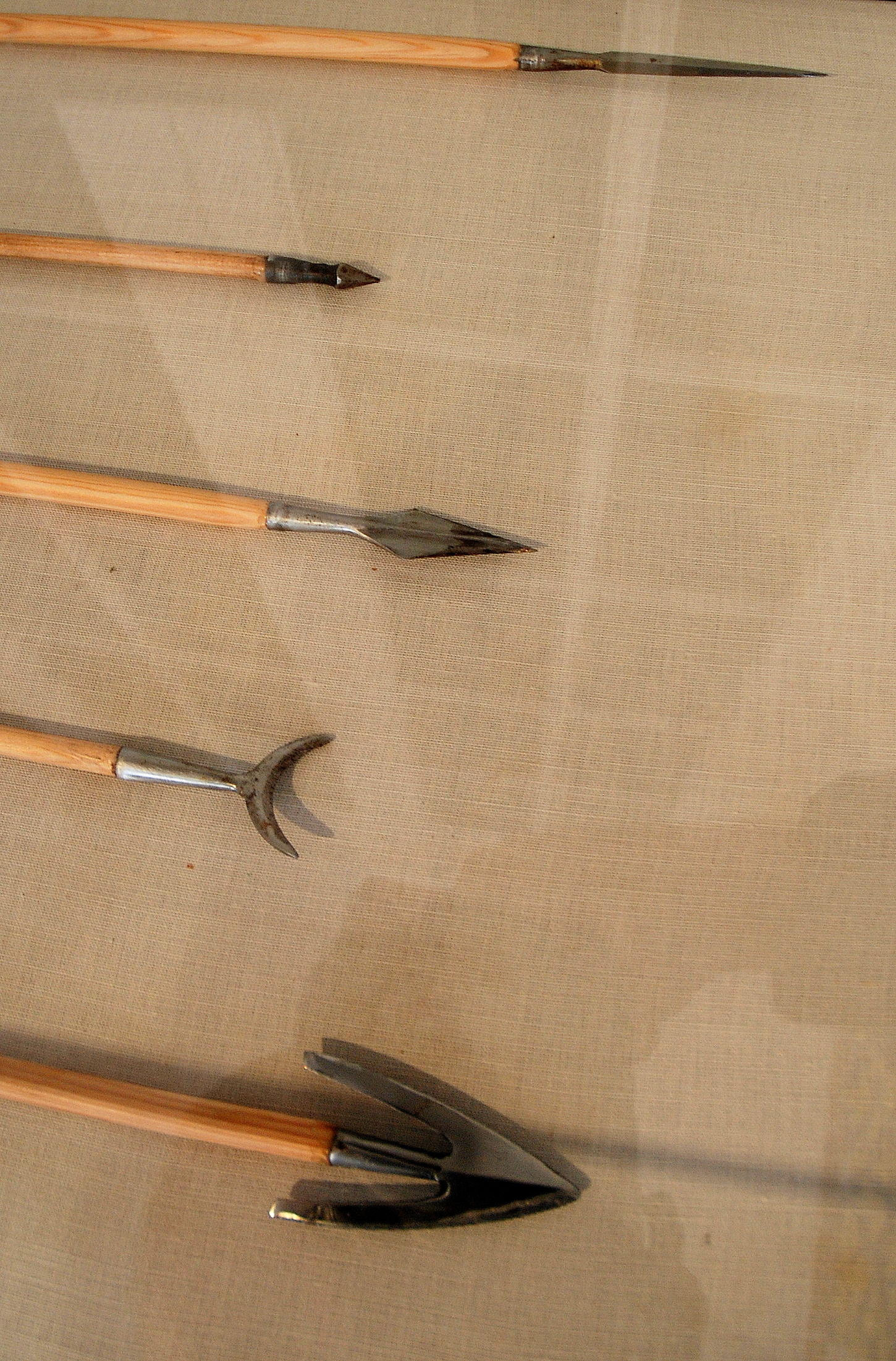
Modern replicas of various medieval European arrowheads

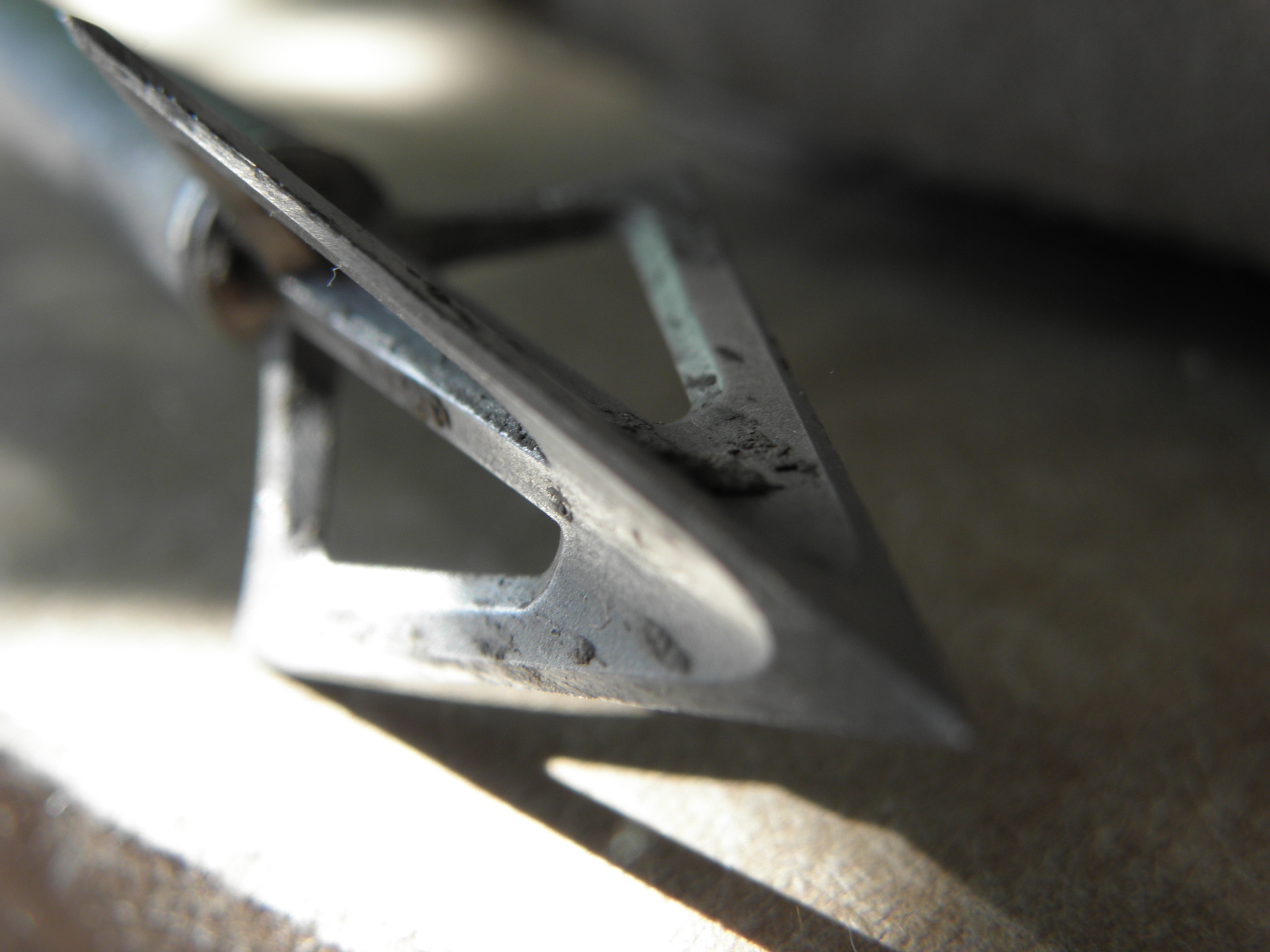
A modern broadhead tip

Arrowheads are usually separated by function:

- Bodkin points are short, rigid points with a small cross-section. They were made of unhardened iron and may have been used for better or longer flight, or for cheaper production. It has been suggested that the bodkin came into its own as a means of penetrating armour, however limited research has so far found no hardened bodkin points, so it appears likely that it was first designed either to extend range or as a cheaper and simpler alternative to the broadhead. In a modern test, a direct hit from a hard steel bodkin point penetrated a set of fifteenth-century chain armour made in Damascus. However, archery was minimally effective against plate armour, which became available to knights of fairly modest means by the late 14th century.
- Judo points have spring wires extending sideways from the tip. These catch on grass and debris to prevent the arrow from being lost in the vegetation. Used for practice and for small game.
- Broadheads were used for war and are still used for hunting. Medieval broadheads could be made from steel, sometimes with hardened edges. They usually have two to four sharp blades that cause massive bleeding in the victim. Their function is to deliver a wide cutting edge so as to kill as quickly as possible. They are expensive, damage most targets, and are usually not used for practice. Two main types of broadheads are used by hunters: the fixed-blade broadhead and the mechanical broadhead. While the fixed-blade broadhead keeps its blades rigid and unmovable on the broadhead at all times, the mechanical broadhead deploys its blades upon contact with the target, its blades swinging out to wound the target. "There are three requirements to making a broadhead. 1. It must be wide enough to cut through tissue to produce a quick, clean kill. 2. It must be narrow enough to penetrate well. 3. It must be of a shape that can be sharpened well." A few models known as hybrid broadheads have both fixed and replaceable blades, most often two relatively small fixed blades and two longer mechanically opening blades.

The mechanical head flies better because it is more streamlined, but has less penetration as it uses some of the kinetic energy in the arrow to deploy its blades.

- Three-bladed, trilobate, or Scythian arrowheads appears in regions under influence of the Scythians and ancient Persians. It was the type normally used by the Achaemenid army.
- Target points are bullet-shaped with a sharp point, designed to penetrate target butts easily without causing excessive damage to them.
- Field points are similar to target points and have a distinct shoulder, so that missed outdoor shots do not become as stuck in obstacles such as tree stumps. They are also used for shooting practice by hunters, by offering similar flight characteristics and weights as broadheads, without getting lodged in target materials and causing excessive damage upon removal.
- Safety arrows are designed to be used in various forms of reenactment combat, to reduce the risk when shot at people. These arrows may have heads that are very wide or padded. In combination with bows of restricted draw weight and draw length, these heads may reduce to acceptable levels the risks of shooting arrows at suitably armoured people. The parameters will vary depending on the specific rules being used and on the levels of risk felt acceptable to the participants. For instance, SCA combat rules require a padded head at least 1 1/4 inches (3 cm) in diameter, with bows not exceeding 28 inches (70 cm) and 50 pounds (23 kg) of draw for use against well-armoured individuals. The Australia/New Zealand based SCA Kingdom of Lochac use 30-pound (14 kg) bows and much smaller safety arrow heads similar to modern rubber bird blunts for their combat archery as these more accurately simulate real arrows.

== See also ==
- Stone tool
- Elfshot
- Thunderstone (folklore)
- Projectile point
- Bodkin point
