= Fairy riding =

Type of paralysis in Scottish livestock

Fairy riding (Scottish Gaelic: marcachd shìth/a' mharcachd-shìth/na marcachd-shìth) was a term used for a kind of paralysis found in livestock in Scotland. It occurred in the spine of sheep, cows and horses, and was attributed to fairies riding on them.

It was also attributed in some places where perspiration, due to weakness, was discovered in cattle.

It can be compared to elf-shot, where fairies were thought to have shot animals.
