= Twilight of the Godlings =

Twilight of the Godlings: The Shadowy Beginnings of Britain's Supernatural Beings is a 2023 book by Francis Young.

== Key arguments and conceptual framework ==
The book argues that, partly by overcoming a deep scholarly divide between classical and medieval studies, it is possible to write a contiguous history of supernatural beings in British culture referred to by Young as "godlings" that reaches from the Iron Age to the end of the Middle Ages. The book recognises the difficulty of defining "godlings", but characterises them as non-human; chthonic; ambiguous in terms of their species or gender; and, in Karen Jolly's words, "associated with abstract concepts of fate and destiny".

In George Morris's summary, "Over the long run the author identifies a consistent role for these small gods, inhabiting the same cultural niches and bearing significant similarities, such as an association with sources of water. But Young also has an eye for change over time, and argues that consistency can be misleading: the fairies are not survivals from a pagan pantheon, but something more complex." In William G. Pooley's summary, "Rather than the wholesale ‘survival’ of pagan gods into the medieval or even modern period, what Young proposes is something more like the Ship of Theseus", adopting "the challenging but laudable approach of prioritizing functions and characteristics over names [...] Nobody would argue that the figure of 'Lady Luck' invoked by modern gamblers is a 'survival' of Fortuna or the Fates of Roman religion, and yet through a process of 'repersonification', British cultures have continued to repopulate this niche with remarkably similar figures".

== Summary ==
The book has five chapters.

Chapter 1: "A World Full of Small Gods: Understanding Godlings." This focuses on the Iron Age, and "offers a longue durée overview of the variable beliefs" in godlings "from the Iron Age to medieval Britain, in opposition to survivalist accounts of residual paganism, animism, or shamanism".

Chapter 2: "Menagerie of the Divine: Godlings in Roman Britain." This explores how Roman culture shaped beliefs in Britain.

Chapter 3: "The Nymph and the Cross: Godlings and Christianisation." Here Young argues that Christianisation in the late antique and early medieval period was influential on beliefs in godlings to a similar degree to Romanisation, and asserts that Christianity in Britain was more amenable to adapting to local beliefs and syncretising with them than has traditionally been supposed.

Chapter 4: "Furies, Elves and Giants: Godlings in Early Medieval Britain". Young argues that cultural change during the early medieval period meant that by the eleventh century, a "fairy synthesis" had emerged, whereby British godlings fell into "five loose categories [...] First there were the men of the woods, 'woodwoses', or fauns. Second, there were elves ('although it remains unclear exactly what elves were'). Third were the triads of supernatural women, often responsible for 'fate'. Fourth, were diminutive other-worlders, who sometimes lived in underground kingdoms. Finally, there were heroes who had become supernatural beings."

Chapter 5: "The Fairy Synthesis: Godlings in Later Medieval Britain". This chapter argues that a "Norman cultural revolution" led to a new "fairy synthesis" in Britain, constituting a starker cultural break than earlier transitions.

Epilogue: in Karen Jolly's reading, this "looks beyond to the 'fairy legacy' today, where it becomes clear that the intended audience is primarily contemporary Britain, with an emphasis on 'Britishness' throughout the book’s narrative of origins".

== Reception ==
Writing for Prospect Magazine, Peter Hoskin took that view that "It's a persuasive argument, though also a highly academic one. The book is stuffed with university essay-style self-reference [...] and a sizeable portion of its pages is given over to a dryly methodical introduction and, later, the back matter. There's no doubting that, as Young puts it, 'the study of folkloric beings should be conducted as rigorously as any other historical investigation'—but, still, as a lay reader, I could have done with some mischief and wonder".

Academic reviewers were critical of the book's tight focus on sources from the island of Britain. While acknowledging that in thinking about Britain the book avoids a yet narrower focus on England, Simon Young thought that the book too readily ignored Irish and Continental comparative evidence, while Karen Jolly argued that

In line with the imagined contemporary British audience, the book’s references are fairly insular rather than global. While there are nods to comparative anthropology (23, 61–62, 139), the effects of colonialism, and the possibilities of Indigenous approaches (145), the book is still mired in Western categories of analysis and origin narratives that the author spends much time laboriously deconstructing (particularly noteworthy is the dismantling of the Celtic twilight mythology), while retaining a narrative of "origins" for "Britain" and "Britishness" in this invented category of godlings (260). I wonder what happens when comparative anthropologists studying modern non-Western cultures are replaced by Indigenous scholars studying the anthropologists’ Western cultures and histories? We look forward to a time when we can engage with premodern European beliefs and practices free of secular Enlightenment and colonialist readings by turning toward nonmodern ontologies and Indigenous epistemologies.

Some reviewers saw the discontinuities exposed by the book as more convincing than the continuities it proposes. Thus Simon Young argued that "'Black-boxers' (let us call them) who reject the possibility of a broad-sweep history of the pre-Norman British supernatural will still enjoy Twilight of the Godlings. The book is always stimulating and often brilliant [...] Source after source (material and written) come in for the author’s topiary treatment. It is here, to my mind, that Young’s genius lies. The excess material is clipped away and the essentials are assessed and compared", yet concluded that "This reviewer remains a black-boxer[...]: I suspect that twenty years from now [...] this book will be as gratefully remembered for the negative as for the positive reactions it elicits. Twilight of the Godlings promises, in short, to inaugurate for Britain a debate on longue durée studies of the supernatural".
