= Elvendon =

Coordinates: 51°31′38″N 1°06′05″W

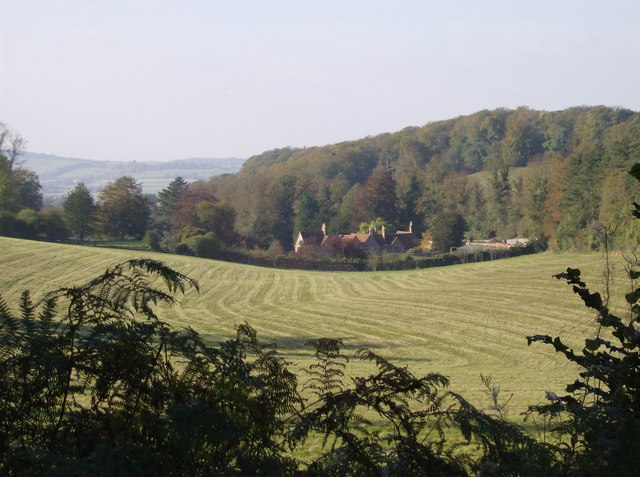
- Field above Elvendon Priory

- Location within Oxfordshire
- OS grid reference: SU624813
- Civil parish: Goring Heath
- Shire county: Oxfordshire
- Region: South East
- Country: England
- Sovereign state: United Kingdom
- Police: Thames Valley
- Fire: Oxfordshire
- Ambulance: South Central

Elvendon is a small settlement in Oxfordshire and the Chiltern Hills, near Goring. It includes the grade II listed building Elvendon Priory.

== Etymology ==
The first element of the name is agreed to be the word elf, either in singular or plural form. The second element was long thought to derive from Old English dūn 'hill', but reanalysis of the primary evidence revealed that the second element is from Old English denu 'valley'. Thus at the time when it was coined, the name meant 'elves' valley' or something like it.
