= The Queen of Elfan's Nourice =

Traditional song

"The Queen of Elfan's Nourice" or "The Queen of Elfland's Nourice" (Roud 3723, Child 40) is an English-language folk song, although fragmentary in form.

== Synopsis ==
A mortal woman laments being taken from her four-day-old son. The Queen of Elfland promises that if she nurses the queen's child, she will be returned. The Queen then points out their path: the road to Elfland, rather than to Heaven or Hell.

== Motifs ==
The path to Elfland appears to be taken from the ballad "Thomas the Rhymer" rather than be a part of this tale.

The plot of the ballad revolves about a common piece of folklore, the taking of human woman to Elfland to nurse fairy babies; women were often regarded as being in particular danger of being taken by the fairies immediately after giving birth.

This ballad was one of 25 traditional works included in Ballads Weird and Wonderful (1912) and illustrated by Vernon Hill.

== See also ==
- List of the Child Ballads
