= Ælfweard =

Ælfweard is the name of:

- Ælfweard of Wessex (902–924), second son of Edward the Elder, according to some sources briefly king of Wessex
- Ælfweard of London (died 1044), Bishop of London
