= Gullkársljóð =

Old Icelandic Eddaic poem

Gullkársljóð ('the poem of Gullkár') is an Old Icelandic Eddaic poem in the fornyrðislag metre.

Although in Eddaic metre and attested in post-medieval manuscripts of the Poetic Edda, the poem has not been included in the canon of Eddaic verse by modern scholars. Nevertheless, it has begun to enjoy attention in scholarship.

== Summary ==
The poem is similar to and perhaps influenced by the Old Norse translation of Marie de France's poem Yonec and the Eddaic Völundarkviða.

King Eiríkr of Greece has a beautiful daughter called Æsa. Her mother Ingibjörg locks her in an outhouse to learn to do needlework. While Æsa is alone here, a red-cloaked lad called Gullkár enters (despite the locked door), and wins her love by magically giving her expertise in needlework. The two begin an affair; Gullkár is invisible to people other than Ingibjörg. Realising that something is afoot, Eiríkr puts guards around Æsa, but the invisible Gullkár beats them up. Eiríkr betrothes Æsa to a series of men. However, each finds himself falling asleep every night, implicitly failing to consummate a marriage to Æsa, and each goes home after a year leaving her with her parents. Æsa's relationship with Gullkár continues.

Gullkár warns Æsa that their relationship will now be disrupted by an ogress who will visit with fair form, but whose gifts Æsa must refuse. The ogress arrives in a green cloak and promises to make Æsa healthy. Although Æsa refuses the ogress's gifts, the ogress succeeds in leaving a splinter in Æsa's room; this turns into a knife on which Gullkár cuts himself while visiting. Gullkár leaves the house, as does Æsa shortly after. She wanders alone through forests, her clothes becoming tattered, until one night she comes upon a small house; by this time, she cannot even remember her father's name. In the house is Gullkár and his mother; the house is implicitly in Álfheimar. It emerges that Gullkár has been cursed by the ogress and lies sick. If he dies, so too will many others, and only Æsa can heal him. Æsa draws the affliction from Gullkár's heart. The poem ends rather abruptly, but implicitly the two live happily ever after.

== Origins and witnesses ==
Gullkársljóð has been dated on linguistic grounds to the mid-fourteenth century. The earliest manuscript witnesses to the poem are from the seventeenth century, including manuscripts of the Poetic Edda. While concluding that the poem must have circulated orally, Haukur Þorgeirsson finds that all surviving manuscripts probably descend from a single, lost archetype.

Manuscripts include:

- JS 28 fol. (Iceland, 1660)
- Lbs 214 4to (Iceland, 1723-1776?)
- Lbs 636 4to (Iceland, 1750–1760)
- Lbs 848 I-VII 4to (Iceland, 1750-1849?)
- Lbs 1689 4to (Iceland, 1770-1820?)

== Editions ==
- Ólafr Davíðsson, Íslenzkar þulur og þjóðkvæði (Copenhagen: Hið íslenzka bókmentafélag, 1898)
