= Valdimar Tr. Hafstein =

Icelandic folklorist (born 1972)

Academic work
- Discipline: Folkloristics

Valdimar Tr. Hafstein (born 12 October 1972) is a professor of folkloristics and ethnology at the University of Iceland. He received his MA in folklore in 1999 and his Ph.D. in 2004 from the University of California, Berkeley, where he studied with Alan Dundes and John Lindow. He completed the BA degree in folkloristics and ethnology at the University of Iceland in 1995 under the guidance of professor Jón Hnefill Aðalsteinsson. He has been a visiting professor at the University of California, Berkeley, the University of Gothenburg, the Meertens Institute of the Royal Netherlands Academy of Arts and Sciences and the Georg-August Universität Göttingen, and a research fellow at the Institute for Advanced Studies at New York University. Valdimar chaired the Icelandic Commission for UNESCO from 2011-2012. He was president of the International Society for Ethnology and Folklore from 2013-2017.

He helped found the open access journal Cultural Analysis in 2000 and served as its co-editor until 2007. He serves on the editorial boards for Ethnologia Europaea, the Journal of American Folklore and Cultural Analysis. He has published widely in English and Icelandic on topics ranging from cultural heritage to copyright, from UNESCO to contemporary and medieval legends, and from traditional wrestling to CCTV surveillance. His work has been translated into French, Italian, Portuguese, Croatian, and Danish.
