= Lady Alice =

Child ballad

Lady Alice is Child ballad 85. It may be a fragment of a longer ballad that has not been preserved.

== Synopsis ==
Lady Alice sees a corpse being carried by and is told it is her lover. She asks the bearers to leave the corpse, saying that she herself will be dead by sundown the next day. The two are buried apart, but roses from his grave grow to reach her breast, only to be severed by a passing priest.

== Variants ==
Lord Lovel, Child ballad 75, uses equivalent themes.

== Commentary ==
The entwined flowers appear also in Barbara Allen, Lord Thomas and Fair Annet, and Fair Margaret and Sweet William.
