= True lover's knot =

Type of knot

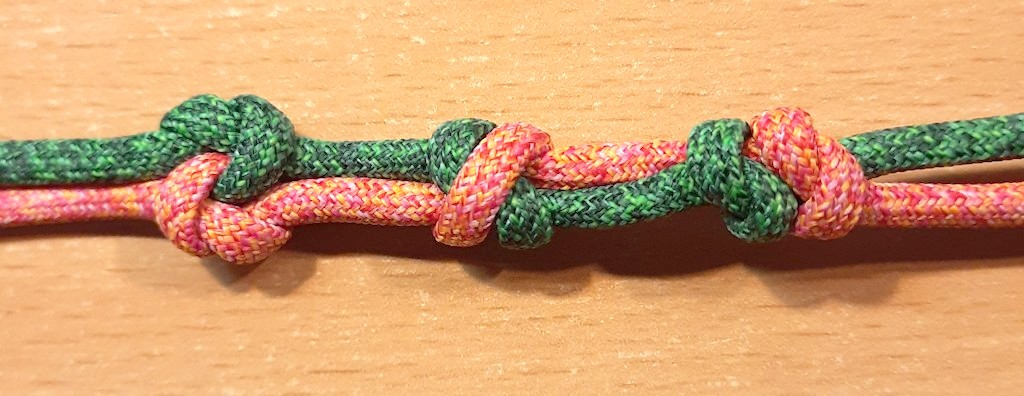
- Some knots often referred to as true lover's knots. the left one is also known as Dutch bend, the middle one is also known as Matthew Walker knot, the right one as Fisherman's knot.
- Names: True lover's knot, True Love Knot, love-knot, Fisherman's knot, Middleman's knot, Shamrock knot
- Category: Bend
- Category 2: Loop
- Related: Fisherman's knot, Matthew Walker's knot, Dutch bend
- Typical use: symbolism, connecting two (or more, for Dutch bend) lines, lanyards, decorative
- ABoK: #798, #1038, #1143, #1414, #2418, #2301, #2394, #2420, #2421, #2423, #2424, #2425, #2425, #2426

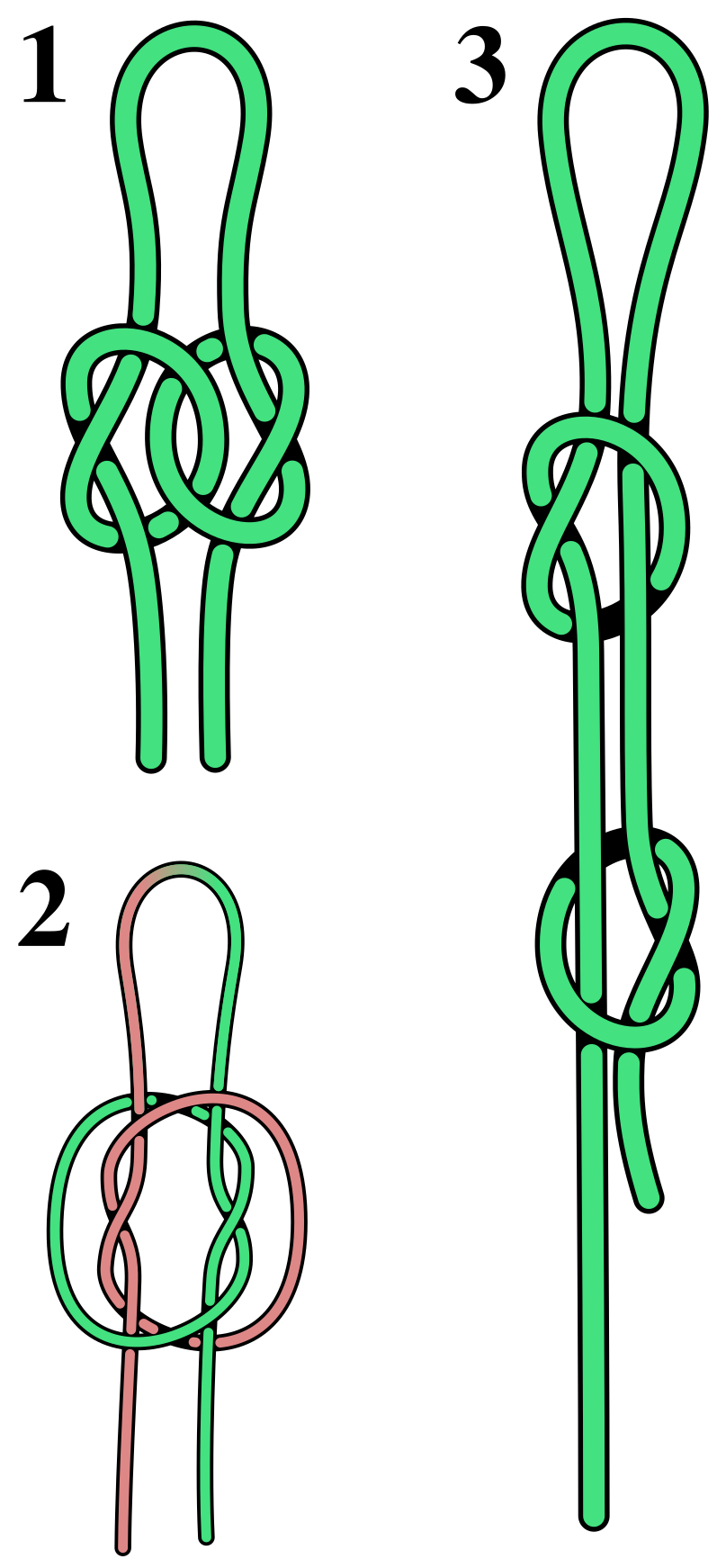
Three knots often referred to as "true lover's knot", tied into a single line forming a loop. 1: also known as a Dutch bend; 2: also known as Matthew Walker knot; 3: also known as fisherman's knot/loop.

The term true lover's knot, also called true love knot or simply love-knot amongst others, is used for many distinct knots. The association of knots with the symbolism of love, friendship and affection dates back to antiquity (although the term itself is attested from the late 1300s). Because of this, no single knot can be labeled the true "true love knot".

In practical terms, these knots are generally shown as two interlocked overhand knots made in two parallel ropes or cords. The variations are in the ways in which the overhand knots interweave and in the final arrangement of the knot or knots.

The true lovers' knot is a motif in several British folk songs, including "Barbara Allen", "Lord Thomas and Fair Annet", "Lord Lovel", and "Fair Margaret and Sweet William". The knot, made of a rose growing from one lover's grave and a brier from the other's, is described at the end of the ballad. It symbolises their fidelity in love even after death.

Modern Western knotting literature has the name for these related knots deriving from stories or legends in which the knots symbolize the connection between a couple in love. Many examples feature Algerian sailors separated from their beloveds. Ashley notes that it was once a common style in sailors' wedding rings, where gold wire was wrought to incorporate the "true lovers" knot, creating a ring containing two tori, inseparable, yet flexible and able to move about each other.

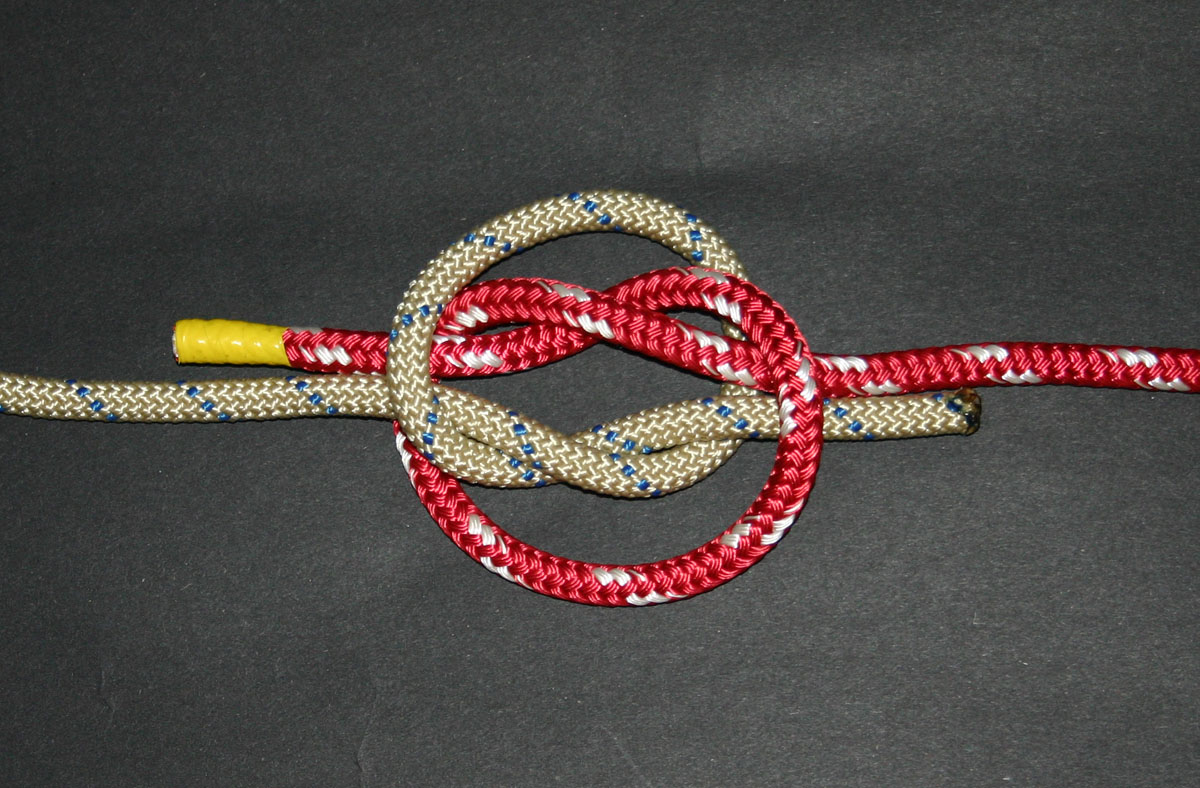
Matthew Walker knot as true lover's knot (#2421) before tightening.

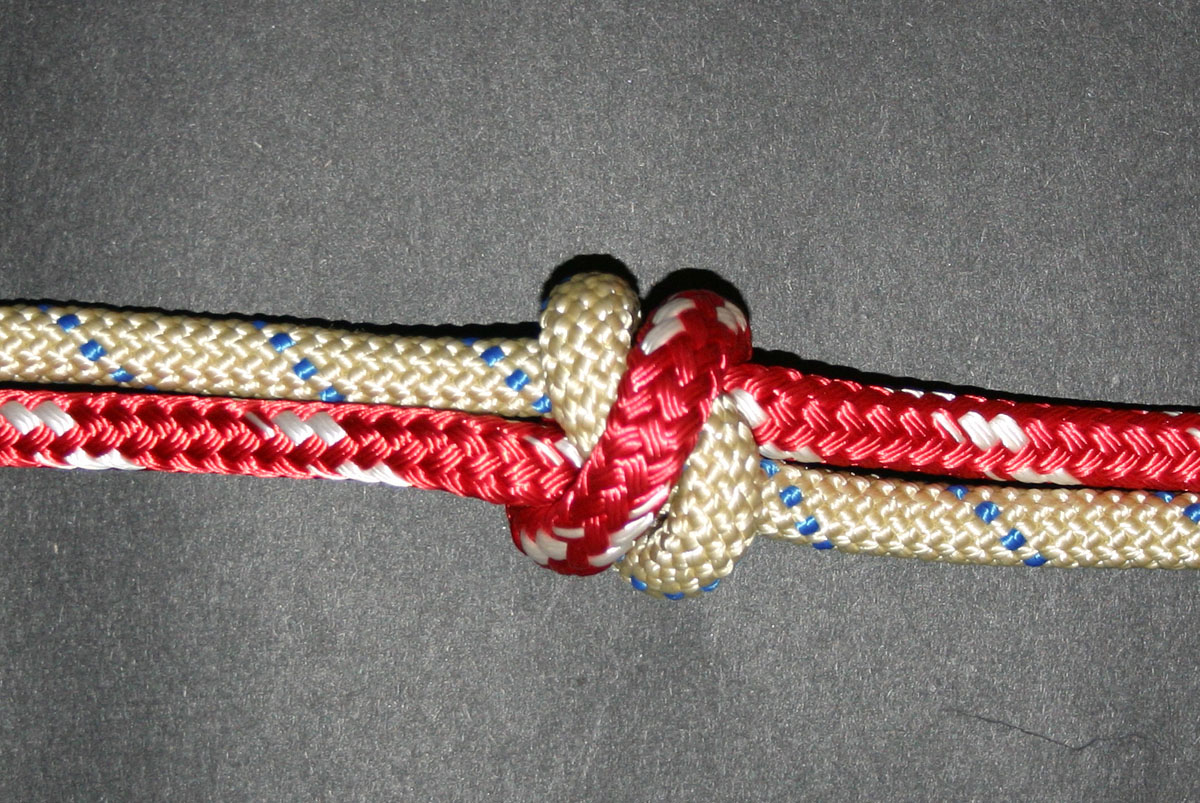
Matthew Walker knot tightened.

== Examples in literature ==
- In Gone With the Wind (novel), part two, chapter XV, when Ashley is about to return to the war after his Christmas furlough, Scarlett makes him a sash and ties the ends in a lover’s knot.
- "A Love Knot"; a short story about Bengali Hindus featuring a goldsmithed love knot.
- A “love-knotte” is mentioned in the prologue to the Canterbury Tales.
- In Sir Gawain and the Green Knight (line 612), Gawain's neck-support is embroidered with "trueloves"
- In The Highwayman, a poem by Alfred Noyes, Bess is “plaiting a dark red love-knot into her long black hair.”

== See also ==
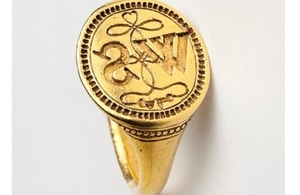
True lover's knot engraved on the purported Shakespeare's signet ring

- List of bend knots
- List of knots
