= An Echo of Hooves =

Studio album by June Tabor
- Released: 2003
- Recorded: April and May, 2003
- Venue: Lion Ballroom, Leominster, Herefordshire
- Genre: Folk
- Label: Topic Records
- Producer: Charlie Beresford, Mark Emerson

June Tabor chronology
Rosa Mundi (2001)	An Echo of Hooves (2003)	At the Wood's Heart (2005)

An Echo of Hooves is a 2003 album by folk singer June Tabor. The album consists entirely of traditional ballads, mostly border ballads., and all eleven tracks are indexed in the Child Ballads. It received strong reviews, rated four out of five stars by Robin Denselow of The Guardian. Roots-folk music magazine RootsFolk noted: "What really sets this release apart from other treatments of these ballads is that Tabor starts with the premise that these are great stories with colorful, fully drawn characters, not just strings of words to hang music on".

== Track listing ==
From the album's liner notes

1. Bonnie James Campbell (Child 210) (words: trad/ tune: Tabor)
2. The Duke of Athole's Nurse (Child 212) (trad)
3. The Battle of Otterburn (Child 161) (trad)
4. Lord Maxwell's Last Goodnight (Child 195) (words: trad/tune: Tabor)
5. Hughie Graeme (Child 191) (words:trad/tune: Tabor & Emerson)
6. The Border Widow's Lament (Child 106)(trad)
7. Fair Margaret and Sweet William (Child 74) (trad)
8. Rare Willie (Child 215) (trad)
9. Young Johnstone (Child 88) (words:trad/ tune: trad & Tabor & Simpson)
10. The Cruel Mother (Child 20) (trad)
11. Sir Patrick Spens (Child 58) (words:trad/ tune: trad & Tabor)

== Personnel ==
- June Tabor - vocals
- Huw Warren - piano, cello, piano accordion
- Mark Emerson - viola, violin, piano
- Tim Harries - double bass
- Martin Simpson - guitar
- Kathryn Tickell - Northumbrian pipes
