= Van Diemen's Land (folk song) =

Folk song

- English Folk Song by Unknown
- Other name: "Henry the Poacher", etc.
- Catalogue: Roud 221
- Genre: Transportation ballad
- Text: Traditional
- Published: 1800s: England
- Publisher: Many broadside printers

Van Diemen's Land or Henry the Poacher, Young Henry's Downfall, Beware Young Men (Roud 221). is an English transportation ballad. It was widely published in broadsides during the 19th century, and was collected from traditional singers in England during the twentieth century. It has been recorded by many singers influenced by the British folk revival.

It is a cautionary tale describing the fate of a man convicted of poaching and sentenced to transportation to the British penal colony in Van Diemen's Land, (modern day Tasmania).

There is another song also called "Van Diemen's Land" which has been collected in England, Scotland, Ireland and the USA. It has a different story and tune. This song is also called "The Gallant Poachers", "The Poacher's Song" and "Poacher Joe".

== Synopsis ==
Henry, the narrator, asks "wild and wicked youths" to listen to "the fate of our poor transports, as you shall understand, the hardships they do undergo upon Van Diemen's Land". The narrator describes his upbringing in Warwickshire, Worcestershire or Lancashire ("My parents reared me tenderly, good learning they give to me"), and introduces himself, and then tells us how he and three (or five) companions were arrested while poaching, tried at the Assizes, ("We being old offenders it made our case more hard") and sentenced to 14 years transportation.

He describes the voyage to Australia,

No land, no harbour could we see, and believe it is no lie,
for about us one black water, above us one blue sky

his thoughts about the parents he has left behind, the ship's arrival in Australia and the dismay he and his fellow prisoners felt on seeing "our fellow sufferers there" acting as draught animals "Some was chained unto a harrow and some unto a plough".

The transportees are marched to the settlement, and he is sold to a master who treats him well, and for whom he works as a bookkeeper. He even finds a partner, but he is still a prisoner:

He kept a female servant, Rosanna was her name.
For fourteen years a convict, from Worcestershire she came.
We oft-times tell our love tales there where we are so far from home,
For now we're rattling of our chains in foreign lands to roam.

Some versions have a refrain:

Young men, all now beware,
Lest you are drawn into a snare.

== Early versions ==
=== Broadsides and early printed versions ===
Many broadside printers printed this song, often paired with "All Jolly Fellows that Follow the Plough".

=== Versions Collected from Traditional Singers ===
The Roud Folk Song index lists 11 versions of this song collected from traditional singers from all over England. Three versions were found in Norfolk, and two in Hampshire. Single versions were collected from Cumberland, Yorkshire, Lincolnshire, Worcestershire, Somerset and Sussex.

== Recordings ==
=== Field recordings ===
There are two versions by traditional singers in the British Library Sound Archive, one by Norfolk singer Walter Pardon, with the "Young men beware" refrain, recorded by Reg Hall in 1975, and four verses by an unnamed singer recorded by Stephen Sedley.

Walter Pardon also sings his version on the Voice of the People CD Farewell My Own Dear Native Land. Harry Cox, also from Norfolk, sang "Henry the Poacher" at home in October 1953. Recorded by Peter Kennedy, this version is on the Rounder CD "What Will Become of England? - Harry Cox (1885–1971)". A version by Yorkshire singer Frank Hinchliffe (1923–1995), recorded by Mike Yates, was released on the Topic LP "In Sheffield Park - Traditional Songs from South Yorkshire".

=== Recordings by revival singers and groups ===
There is a recording of Louis Killen singing the song in the Keith Summers collection in the British Library Sound Archive.

Recorded versions include: Ewan McColl and Peggy Seeger on their 1960 LP "Chorus from the Gallows", The Young Tradition, Shirley Collins and the Albion Band, and The Demon Barbers on their CD "Uncut".
