= James Hatley =

Traditional song

"James Hatley" (Roud 4022, Child 244) is an English-language folk ballad, existing in several variants. The ballad tells the story of a man who steals a king's keys, a story that seems to have no historical basis. The identity of the man and his fate differ depending on the ballad's variation.

== Synopsis ==
The ballad has several variants. A villain—Sir Fenwick, False Fennick, or fause Phenix—steals the king's jewels. He lays the blame on James Hatley or Jamie O’Lee. In one variant, the king's daughter steals the keys to ask him whether he did it. Accepting his word, she arranges for a trial by combat. James kills Fenwick, who confesses while dying. The king's daughter offers to marry him.

In another, he is the page to the king's son. He appeals to the prince, who fights for him. False Fennick confesses, and the prince resolves to give his lands to James.

In a third, the king's son escorts him to the trial by combat, because he does not trust fause Phenix. James fights and kills him. He confesses before he dies. The royal family promise him appointments and lands; James declares he would rather be the prince's page. The king dresses him richly for the role.

In both versions where James fights, the ballad observes that James is fifteen and the thief in his thirties, making the triumph remarkable.

== Motifs ==
The negotiations over his release resemble those of "Hughie Graham".

== See also ==
- English folklore
