= Transportation ballads =

Folk songs from the British Isles

Transportation ballads are a genre of broadside ballads that concern the transportation of convicted criminals, originally to the American colonies and later to penal colonies in Australia. They were intended to serve as warnings of the hardships that come with conviction and thereby a deterrent against criminal behavior. Transportation ballads were published as broadsides—song sheets sold cheaply in the streets, at markets and at fairs. Many have passed into the folk tradition.

== Motifs and themes ==
Transportation ballads are almost exclusively related in the first person from the perspective of the convicted person. They employ a number of frequent themes including:

- a good upbringing, thereby implying that a life of crime was choice
- a decision to take up with persons of low moral repute
- incidental financial or emotional injury to the narrator's family
- harsh treatment of the narrator after conviction

More rarely, transportation ballads served as a form of protest, particularly as a means of opposing the sentencing of those convinced of political crimes.

=== Examples ===
The following extracts exemplify such themes:

==== A good upbringing ====
My father and my mother dear they nourished me in my tender years,
They little thought I should be trapann'd and banished from my native land.

— "The returned convict; or the horrors of transportation" (Roud V9114)

==== Bad influences ====
I fell in love with a damsel, she was handsome and gay,
I neglected my work more and more every day.
And to keep her like a lady, I went on the highway,
And for that I got sent to Australia.

— "Australia", as sung by Cyril Poacher

==== Harm to family ====
Farewell my aged mother, I'm vexed for what I've done,
I hope none will upcast to you the race that I have run;
I hope you'll be provided for when I am far away,
Far frae the bonnie hills and dales o' Caledonia.

— "Jamie Raeburn's Farewell", as sung by Daisy Chapman

==== Harsh conditions ====
They chained us two by two and whipped and lashed along
They cut off our provisions if we did the least thing wrong
They march us in the burning sun until our feet are sore
So hard's our lot now we are got to Van Diemen's shore

— "The Female Transport" (Roud V1284)

== Notable works ==
=== Songs classified as transportation ballads ===
- "Australia" (Roud 1488) – alternatively titled "Virginny", "The Lads of Virginia", "The Transports of Virginia"; broadside versions from the 19th century seem to be exclusively of the Virginia version
- "Botany Bay" (Roud 261, Laws L16) – alternatively titled "Whitby Lad", "Bound for Botany Boy", "Adieu to Old England", "The Transport's Farewell"; in the United States it was altered to become "The Boston Burglar" (alternatively "Boston City", "Charlestown", and "The Louisville Burglar")
- "The Convict" (Roud 1501) – alternatively "London Prentice Boy"; tells of a young man who is persuaded by a girl to murder his master for his money but at the last minute decides against the murder because of his master's kindness; he takes the money, is betrayed by the girl, and is tried and transported.
- "Jamie Raeburn's Farewell" (Roud 600) – particularly popular in Scotland
- "Van Diemen's Land" (Roud 221 and 519, Laws L18) – recognized in two distinct versions, possibly due to popularity due to the sympathetic narrator, who is convicted of poaching, which was often seen as a crime only by the wealthy

=== Other folk songs referencing penal transportation ===
- "Maggie May" (Roud 1757) – an anti-heroine ends up in Botany Bay
- "The Black Velvet Band" (Roud 2146)
- "Flash Company" (Roud 954) – alternatively "The Yellow Handkerchief"; some versions omit transportation references
- "Jim Jones at Botany Bay" (Roud 5478)
- "Mitchell's Address" (Roud 5163)
- "The Isle of France" (Roud 1575)
- "The Boys of Mullaghbawn" (Roud 2362),
- "The Maids Lamentation" (Roud V16510)
- "Frost, Williams, and Jones's farewell to England" (Roud V15587) – John Frost and others transported during the Chartist struggle for adult male franchise
- "The Cotton Spinners Farewell" (Roud V15587) – concerns Scottish cotton spinners sentenced to seven years for trades union activities
- "Proper Objects for Botany Bay" (Roud V27861) – praises penal transportation lists classes of people the author feels should be transported
