= Walter Pardon =

Norfolk folk singer

- Born: 4 March 1914; Knapton, Norfolk, England
- Died: 9 June 1996 (aged 82) Knapton, Norfolk, England
- Occupations: carpenter, folk singer

Walter Pardon (4 March 1914 – 9 June 1996) was an English carpenter, folk singer and recording artist from Knapton, Norfolk, England. He learned songs and tunes from older members of his family and remembered and performed them at a time when most people of his generation were uninterested in traditional music. He was then able to pass his songs and tunes on to a new generation of folk music collectors and performers.

== Early life ==
Walter William Pardon was born and brought up in the cottage in Knapton where his mother, Emily (Nee Gee), was born in 1874. He was an only child from a family in which most men were farm workers.

According to Pardon's cousin Roger Dixon, singing and music played a big part in the life of the Gee family. Several of the family played violin, accordion or flute. Dixon relates that there were all sorts of family stories about music-making in the past: 'One was that the family formed the church band in the reign of William IV in the 1830s, before the Robinson family provided the first harmonium for the church.' Dixon notes that Pardon kept the big drum of the Knapton Drum and Fife band, formed in the late 19th century, in his shed.

In his youth, Pardon attended a Methodist Sunday School in Knapton.

Pardon was apprenticed to a carpenter at the age of 14, and worked in that trade all his life. He spent four years in the army at Aldershot during the Second World War, still working as a carpenter. After his service in the Army he returned to the cottage in Knapton, where he lived for the rest of his life.

== Career as a traditional singer and informant ==
Walter Pardon's second cousin on his mother's side, Roger Dixon, a history teacher, had as a child heard Walter singing when visiting his parents. In the late 1970s Dixon persuaded Pardon to record twenty of his songs on tape. Dixon gave a copy of the tape to singer Peter Bellamy, who had been his pupil. Bellamy passed the tape on to record producer Bill Leader.

Pardon was interviewed and recorded by folk enthusiasts, including Karl Dallas, before his first record was released. In the early recording with Dallas, Pardon is clear that his family did not use the term 'folk songs', but referred to 'old songs'. He states that when he first made recordings for Dixon he had no idea about folk revivals and suchlike. He states that he did encounter some songs called 'folk' at school. He also states that his uncle Billy would tell him the words to some songs and he would write them down. Billy could not do this as he had lost the use of some of his fingers so Pardon had to do it. In this interview, Pardon discusses a number of bawdy songs, including "Cock a Doodle Do" and what he calls "The Bush of Australia".

Walter Pardon's first LP, A Proper Sort was released in 1975, followed by Our Side of the Baulk in 1977. He appeared at folk clubs and festivals and was invited by A L Lloyd to join a group of English singers attending the American Bicentennial celebrations in 1976. Two more LPs were issued in 1982 and 1983.

Many folk song collectors interviewed and recorded him, including Bill Leader, Mike Yates, Rod Stradling, and Roy Palmer.

An article that Pardon wrote about the Knapton Drum and Fife Band after a talk with Mike Yates appeared in the booklet accompanying the posthumous release 'Put a Bit of Powder on it' and may also be read via the MUSTRAD online folk Imagazine. It was originally published in Folk Roots magazine, No 28, October 1985.

== Retirement and death ==
"In 1989, when Walter had passed his seventy-fifth birthday, he decided that his voice was no longer as strong as it had been, and so he stopped singing in public." Walter Pardon died in 1996, and was buried in Swafield churchyard. In 1997 a memorial concert was held at Conway Hall, London to raise money for a headstone.

== Field recordings ==
There are a number of field recordings of Walter Pardon singing songs and ballads, and playing, as well as interviews and other material available online at the British Library Sound Archive in the Reg Hall and Roy Palmer collections. A lecture given by Pat Mackenzie and Jim Carroll in 2004 and filmed by Conor McMahon includes excerpts from their interviews with Pardon.

== Repertoire and its provenance ==
Pardon is said to have learned most of his songs from his uncle, Billy Gee (1863-1942), who lived with Walter and his family. Billy Gee, in turn, had learned much of his repertoire from his father, Thomas Cook Gee. Walter believed his grandfather had learned songs from broadsheets. There were few opportunities for Walter to sing in his younger days. Most people of his generation weren't much interested in old songs, and while his uncle had sung in pub sessions in a nearby town, these sessions were dying out in his neighbourhood by the time he was old enough to attend. His family would exchange songs at Christmas gatherings in the cottage, but these stopped when his mother died in 1953.

Walter's father died in 1957, and Walter lived alone in the cottage from then on. By his own account he would sit on the stairs in the cottage playing the tunes of his songs on his melodeon.

Walter Pardon is said to have known at least 182 songs. Some of these, for example "A Ship to Old England Came" (Roud 1424) are rare, and have not been recorded from other traditional singers. As well as ballads such as "The Trees they do Grow High" (Roud 31, Laws O35) and Lord Lovel (Roud 48, Child 75), he sang music hall songs such as "Old Brown's Daughter" (Roud 1426). Among his more unusual songs were anthems of the nineteenth century National Agricultural Labourers' Union led by Joseph Arch, such as "We Meet Today in Freedom's Cause" (Roud 1774) and "An Old Man's Advice" (Roud 1482).

According to Mike Yates, 'Walter said that he'd learned particular songs from various family members - but accounts differ dependent upon who he was talking to and when.'

Walter learned some songs from records that he listened to using a wind-up gramophone. Mike Yates published a list of Pardon's 78 RPM record collection as part of the notes to his selection of Pardon Songs 'Put a Bit of Powder on it, Father'.

It has been suggested that Pardon may have used, or actually did use contemporary printed sources to eke out words forgotten or half-known. Mike Yates thought that Pardon could only remember parts of 'I'm Yorkshire Though in London', and obtained the rest from Frank Purslow's book 'The Wanton Seed'.

== Academic studies ==
Pardon is one of four ‘traditional’ singers, with overlapping lifetimes, compared in a 2005 doctoral thesis by David Hillery.

Hillery discusses the motivations and practices of the song-collectors in the first and second revivals, the latter of which covers the case of Pardon. Regarding the second revival, he comments “The more democratic milieu of the 1970s made for a more relaxed social relationship between those and those recording, though this brought other problems of intensified mediation inherent in collectors’ attempts to embed themselves deeper and deeper into the lives of their informants.” Hillery notes that Pardon was recognised as a singer for 22 years, from the date of his first recording, in 1974, to his death in 1996. Hillery contrasts Pardon’s situation with that of a traditional singer who received no such wider attention and who was studied only for a brief time towards the end of his life. “Pardon exemplifies the experience of a ‘traditional’ singer who, coming to the attention of an audience more extensive than a purely local one, attracts the attention of those engaged in tradition as a field of scholarship or entertainment where Walter may be regarded as a primary source … Moreover, during the 22 years of his relative fame, Walter’s motivation to extend and develop his repertoire would clearly have been stimulated, pleased and flattered as he may have been by the admiration he received.”

Regarding the provenance of Pardon’s songs, Hillery states “…even a brief examination of his repertoire shows that his songs have an overwhelmingly nineteenth- and early twentieth-century provenance and a ‘residual’ cultural form.” He adds that Pardon regretted that none of the broadsheets from which he believed that his grandfather learned the songs had survived a clear-out that took place after his grandfather’s death. Most of Pardon’s songs would have been learned before he was 28.

Hillery cautions against assuming that the repertoire of a ‘traditional’ singer is fixed and unchanging. Hillery also states that as Pardon learned most of his songs from his family, and did not sing in pubs or elsewhere in public until he was taken up by the folk revival movement, his opportunities to learn new songs up until he was taken up would have been limited to radio, his record collection, and television. Hillery (p171) lists songs that were both in Pardon’s repertoire and in his record collection. These include “Galway Bay” and “The Miner’s Dream of Home.” Hillery states that a few post WWII songs appear in Pardon’s repertoire. These include ”The Yellow Rose of Texas”.

Given the lack of an audience for much of the time, Hillery says that Pardon’s remembering of the songs and the development of his style is one of the remarkable features of his story.

Given that Pardon learned his songs by hearing them as opposed to singing them, Hillery states that it is more likely that Pardon developed his style than that he learned it. One stylistic feature highlighted by Hillery is Pardon’s habit of ending each verse with a vocal dying fall. He asserts that such ‘idiosyncrasies’ are not always successful, especially if over-used. He finds that this is the case in Pardon’s version of “All Jolly Fellows Who Follow the Plough”. He describes Pardon’s singing style as “distinctive, subtly ornamented and pleasant’. “He employs vocal embellishment so subtly that, though its use may be detectable only to the careful listener, its absence would substantially diminish the artistic quality of the performance”.

Regarding Pardon’s awareness of himself as having the status of a ‘traditional singer’, Hillery asserts that there are different views among those who knew Pardon. On the one hand, it has been stated that he understood different genres of songs and their provenance; on the other hand, it has been stated that his example shows that singers took what they wanted, right through the revival, unaware of any latent circumscription.

Hillery refers to a point made by David Atkinson that when singers do use terms such as ‘old songs’ or ‘folk songs’ this may be because they have learned them through contact with collectors. Hillery (p312) thinks that Atkinson might validly have stated this point more strongly, especially in the case when a singer has been positively “celebrated by folk enthusiasts … Encounters with them carried an inevitable, though perhaps unconscious, exerting of cultural influence.”

== Discography ==
=== On his own ===
- A Proper Sort; Leader LED 2063 (1975)
- Our Side of the Baulk; Leader LED 2111 (1977)
- A Country Life; Topic 12TS392 (1982)
- Bright Golden Store - Songs and Music from Knapton in Norfolk; Home Made Music LP301 (1983)
- A World Without Horses; Topic TSCD514 (2000)
- Put a Bit of Powder on it, Father; Musical Traditions; MTCD 305-6 (2000)

=== In "Voice of the People" ===
- Come let us buy the licence - Songs of Courtship & Marriage; TSCD 651; "Peggy Benn" (Roud 661)
- My Ship Shall Sail the Ocean - Songs of Tempest & Sea Battles, Sailor Lads & Fishermen; Topic TSCD 652; "A Ship to Old England Came" (Roud 1424)
- Farewell, My Own Dear Native Land - Songs of Exile & Emigration; Topic TSCD 654; "Van Diemen's Land" (Roud 221)
- Tonight I'll Make You My Bride - Ballads of True & False Lovers; Topic TSCD 656; "The Raggle-Taggle Gypsies" (Roud 1, Child 200)
- Who's That at my Bedroom Window? - Songs of Love & Amorous Encounters; Topic TSCD 660; "Let the Wind Blow High or Low" (Roud 308)
- Troubles They Are But Few - Dance Tunes & Ditties; Topic TSCD 664; "The Hungry Army" (Roud 1746)
- As Me and My Love Sat Courting - Songs of Love, Courtship & Marriage; Topic TSCD 665; "I Wish, I Wish" (Roud 495)
- It Fell on a Day, a Bonny Summer Day - Ballads; Topic TSCD 667; "Jack Hall" (Roud 369, Laws L5)
- To Catch a Fine Buck Was My Delight - Songs of Hunting & Poaching; Topic TSCD 668; "The Poacher's Fate" (Roud 793, Laws L1)

(All 1998)

=== Other anthologies ===
- Hidden English; TSCD600; "Broomfield Hill" (Child 43, Roud 34)
- An English Folk Music Anthology; Folkways Records FE 38553 1981; Smithsonian Folkways FW 38553; 2007; "Lord Lovel", (Roud 48; Child 75), "The Deserter" (Roud 493), "The Maid of Australia" (Roud 1872)
- A Century of Song; EFDSS CD02; 1998; "Bright Golden Store" (Roud 1638)
- English Originals: A Defining Collection of English Folk Song; Topic TSCD706; 1999; "Van Diemen's Land" (Roud 221)
- Root & Branch 1: A New World; EFDSS / Impress RB01; 1999; "Won't You Come to Me in Canada?" (Roud 13534)
- Up in the North and Down in the South: Songs and Music from the Mike Yates Collection 1964-2000; Musical Traditions MTCD311/2; 2001; "Poor Roger is Dead" (Roud 797)
- When the Wind Blows: An Anthology of Traditional Folk Music from Coastal England; Veteran VTC5CD; 2001; "Spanish Ladies" (Roud 687)
- It Was on a Market Day—Two - English Traditional Folk Singers; Veteran VTC7CD; 2006; "Black-Eyed Susan" (Roud 560; Laws O28)
- The Folk Handbook, book w/ CD, Backbeat Books, 2007; "The Rambling Blade" (Roud 490; Laws L12)
- Three Score and Ten: 70 Years of Topic Records; Topic TOPIC70; 2009 "The Devil and the Farmer's Wife" (Roud 160; Child 278)

== Film and video ==
In 1983 the American musician and film-maker John Cohen made "The Ballad and the Source", described as "a sensitive musical portrait of Walter Pardon".

Edge Documentaries produced a video, "Walter Pardon, a life in song" with interviews with neighbours, friends, and folk luminaries for the Walter Pardon Memorial concert at The Atrium, North Walsham, early 2014.
