= Rosa Mundi (album) =

Studio album by June Tabor
- Released: 2001
- Studios: Great Linford Manor, Buckinghamshire, England; Red Bus Studios, London
- Genre: Folk
- Label: Topic
- Producer: John Ravenhall

June Tabor chronology
A Quiet Eye (1999)	Rosa Mundi (2001)	An Echo of Hooves (2003)

Rosa Mundi is a 2001 album by folk singer June Tabor. It is a concept album that represents Tabor's exploration of the rose as a symbol of love, of beauty and hope. As a folk singer, Tabor’s primary sources are traditional but it is her secondary source choices, ranging from Tchaikovsky to a Great War ballad via Robbie Burns and a version of a German traditional piano song "Es ist ein Ros entsprungen", that separate this album from being a generalist folk music album. Tabor's singing is understated, reflecting her desire for the songs to be centre stage.

The album was reviewed favourably by a number of British music critics. RootsWorld's Jim Foley described Rosa Mundi in positive terms, stating that close attention to their lyrics renders this pleasant experience moving In The Guardian Robin Denselow praised Rosa Mundi, and commented that Tabor's work demonstrated a commitment to the art of song with each song sung with Tabor's distinctive vocals. The article praised Tabor as amongst the finest of contemporary folk singers. A separate RootsWorld review said that Rosa Mundi was outstanding and that Tabor was a contemporary singer of importance with an ability to express herself with clarity and beauty. British folk music magazine fRoots reviewed the album at the time of release, and had championed Tabor for over twenty years, republishing an interview with Tabor in the final issue in 2019.

== Track listing ==
1. "Roses of Picardy" (words & music: Fred Weatherly)
2. "Belle Rose" (traditional)
3. "Deep in Love" (traditional)
4. "O My Luve's Like a Red Red Rose" (words: Robert Burns/tune: traditional)
5. "Rose in June" (traditional)
6. "Paint Me, Redouté" (words: Les Barker / tune: Tabor & Emmerson)
7. "Rhosyn Wyn / Winterrose aka Es ist ein Ros entsprungen" (trad 15th century German /arr. Tabor, Warren, Emerson, Bolton)
8. "The Rose Is White, The Rose Is Red/ Dargason" (traditional) / tune: (music in manuscript)
9. "The Crown of Roses (Tchaikovsky's legend)" (words: Plechteev/ tune: Tchaikovsky/ arrangement: Tabor, Warren, Emerson, Bolton)
10. "Barbry Ellen" (trad) (Child 84, Roud 54)
11. "Maybe Then I'll Be a Rose" (words :Les Barker/ tune: Savourna Stevenson)

== Personnel ==
- June Tabor – vocals
- Huw Warren – piano
- Mark Emerson – viola, violin
- Richard Bolton – cello
