= Hughie Graham =

Traditional song

"Hughie Graham" or "Hughie Graeme" (Child 191, Roud 84) is an English and Scots folk song, existing in several variants. A version collected in Selkirkshire titled "Hughie the Graeme" was published in Walter Scott's Minstrelsy of the Scottish Border (1802). There is a printed version in the Bodleian Library under the title "The Life and Death of Sir Hugh The Grime". It is dated between 1672 and 1696. The version collected by Robert Burns was published by James Johnson (engraver) in the Scots Musical Museum (1803). It is in volume 4 song no. 303, pages 312 and 313. The Vaughan Williams Memorial Library lists several other versions in printed collections, including "Scottish Ballads" (1829) by the publisher Robert Chambers.

== Synopsis ==
Hughie Graham is caught for stealing the bishop's horse, and sentenced to hang. The motive for the theft is said to be that the bishop had seduced his wife. Several pleas to ransom him are unavailing. He sees his mother or father and sends greetings to his father, his sword to Johnnie Armstrong, and a curse to his wife, Maggie. In the version collected for Walter Scott, Hughie is tried for his crime in Carlisle in Cumbria. In the version collected from Mrs. Lyall, discussed by Ewan McColl in his Folk Songs and Ballads of Scotland (1965), aspects of the narrative are located in Strivling, an older spelling for the burgh of Stirling.

== Interpretation ==
The protagonist appears to be one of the Grahams, a prominent family of Border reivers in the 16th Century. Scott and others have identified the bishop of the ballad as Robert Aldrich, Bishop of Carlisle from 1537 to 1556, but there is no historical evidence to support its narrative. Rupert Ferguson suggests that the ballad is a reworking of much older material relating to the efforts of the early Christian Church to suppress a pagan Brythonic horse cult, of which Hughie the Grime is the iconic representative; the term Gruamach or Gramach being applied to one of stern or forbidding manner.

== Recordings ==
Ewan MacColl recorded a version on "Chorus From The Gallows" (1960) Topic 12T16 as "Hughie The Graeme" and on several other albums, including "Ballads" Topic 2009 TSCD576D

Dáithí Sproule recorded a version with fiddling master James Kelly and button box master Paddy O'Brien (Offaly) on the Shanachie album Traditional Music of Ireland.

Being a well-documented song and publicised by English Folk Dance and Song Society, The Broadside Ballads Project, and Mainly Norfolk, the song was recorded by Jon Boden and Oli Steadman for inclusion in their respective lists of daily folk songs "A Folk Song a Day" and "365 Days Of Folk".

The Scottish folk band Malinky recorded a version of this song, called "Hughie The Graham", on their 2005 album The Unseen Hours.

English folk singer June Tabor recorded a version of this song on An Echo of Hooves in 2003.

The Czech folk group Asonance recorded a version translated to Czech called "Hugo Graem (Hughie the Graeme)" on Vzdálené ostrovy (Remote Islands) in 2003.

Connie Dover recorded the song as "Hugh the Graeme" on her album The Wishing Well.

Ross Kennedy sang it on the "Various Artists" album "Fyre and Sworde" (1998) Fellside.
