= Bonnie George Campbell =

Traditional song

Bonnie James Campbell or Bonnie George Campbell is Child ballad 210 (Roud 338). The ballad tells of a man who has gone off to fight, but only his horse returns. The name differs across variants. Several names have been suggested as the inspiration of the ballad: Archibald or James Campbell, in the Battle of Glenlivet, or Sir John Campbell of Calder, who was murdered.

== Synopsis ==
Bonnie James (or George) Campbell rides out one day. His horse returns, but he does not. His bride comes out, grieving, that the fields are still growing the harvest but he will never return. In some variants, his mother or sisters also come out when his horse returns. In one of the variants, Campbell laments that "my babe is unborn".

== Lyrics ==
High upon Highlands,
and laigh upon Tay.
Bonnie George Campbell
rode out on a day.

He saddled, he bridled,
and gallant rode he.
And hame cam his guid horse,
but never cam he.

Out cam his mother dear,
greeting fu sair.
Out cam his bonnie bryde,
riving her hair.

"The meadow lies green,
and the corn is unshorn.
My barn is to build, and
my babe is unborn."

Saddled and bridled
and booted rode he,
A plume in his helmet,
a sword at his knee.

But toom cam his saddle
all bloody to see.
Oh, hame cam his guid horse,
but never cam he.

== Notable Performances ==
- Billy Connolly performs the song on an autoharp in the 2004 film, Lemony Snicket's A Series of Unfortunate Events.

== See also ==
- Scottish mythology
- English folklore
