= Lord Thomas and Fair Annet =

Traditional song

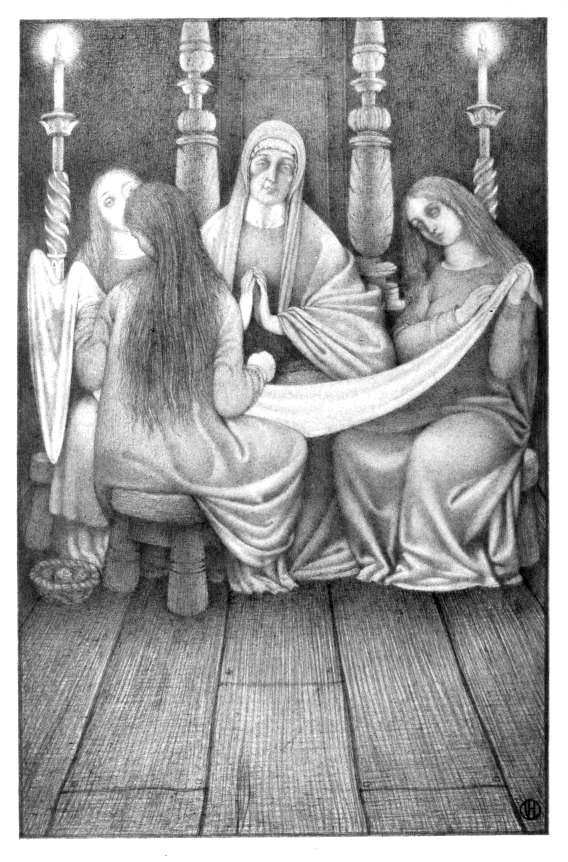
- Vernon Hill's illustration of Annet being dressed for the wedding by her handmaids. From Richard Chope's 1912 collection Ballads Weird and Wonderful.

Song
- Written: 17th century or earlier
- Genre: Folk song
- Songwriter: Unknown

"Lord Thomas and Fair Annet" (Roud 4, Child 73), also known as "Lord Thomas and Fair Eleanor", is an English folk ballad.

== Synopsis ==
Lord Thomas (or Sweet Willie) is in love with Fair Annet, or Annie, or Elinor, but she has little property. He asks for advice. His father, mother, and brother (or some of them) advise that he should instead marry the nut-brown maid with a rich dowry. His mother promises to curse him if he marries Annet and bless him if he marries the nut-brown maid. His sister warns her that her dowry may be lost and then he will be stuck with nothing but a hideous bride. Nevertheless, he takes his mother's advice.

Fair Annet dresses as splendidly as she can and goes to the wedding. The nut-brown maid is so jealous that she stabs Annet to death. Lord Thomas stabs both the nut-brown maid and himself to death. A rose grows from Fair Annet's grave, a brier from Lord Thomas's, and they grow together.

== Texts ==
The oldest known text, entitled "A tragical Story of Lord Thomas and Fair Ellinor", was printed in London in 1677. It opens with the following three verses:

Lord Thomas he was a bold forester,
The chaser of the King's deer,
Fair Eleanor she was a fair woman,
Lord Thomas he loved her dear.

Come riddle, my riddle, dear mother, he said,
And riddle us both as one;
Whether I shall marry with fair Ellinor,
And let the brown-girl alone.

The brown girl she has got houses and lands,
Fair Ellinor she has got none,
Therefore I charge you on my blessing,
To bring me the brown girl home.

== Variations and related ballads ==
Regional and printed variations of the ballad are known by many titles, including "Fair Eleanor", "Lord Thomas and Fair Ellender", "Fair Ellen and the Brown Girl", "Lord Thomas's Wedding", "The Brown Bride", and others. Related English ballads which share stanza composition as well as narratives of heartbreak-induced death include Fair Margaret and Sweet William and Lord Lovel.

Several Norse variants of this ballad exist, although the man does not reject the woman on advice of his friends in them.

== Commentary ==
The grave plants that grow together are a motif to express true love, also found in many variants of Barbara Allen and of Tristan and Iseult, and in the legend of Baucis and Philemon.

This ballad has no connection with "The Nut-Brown Maid", in which a nut-brown maid is the heroine.

== Recordings ==
Many traditional recordings of the ballad have been made,

Jim Copper and Bob Copper had the Copper Family's traditional Sussex version recorded in 1952 and 1976, Peter Kennedy recorded Charlie Wills of Dorset singing a version, and Caroline Hughes, also of Dorset, was recorded singing the ballad by Ewan MacColl / Peggy Seeger and by Peter Kennedy in the 1960s. Collectors such as Peter Kennedy and Hamish Henderson recorded versions in Scotland in the 1950s and 60s.

The song appears to have been extremely popular in the United States, where around 100 field recordings have been made, including Alan Lomax's recording of Jean Ritchie in 1949, a fragment of which can be heard on the Alan Lomax archive website. Jean Ritchie later released a different version on her album "Best of Jean Ritchie".

Oli Steadman included it on his song collection "365 Days Of Folk". (2026)

== See also ==
- Lady Alice
- Fair Annie
