= Robert Bell Wheler =

English antiquarian

- Born: 1 January 1785; Stratford-on-Avon
- Died: 15 July 1857 (aged 72)
- Occupation: Antiquarian

Robert Bell Wheler (1 January 1785 – 15 July 1857) was an English antiquarian.

== Biography ==
Wheler was born at Stratford-on-Avon on 1 January 1785, was son of Robert Wheler (1742–1819), a solicitor of that town. His mother was Elizabeth Loder of Meon Hall, Lower Quinton, Gloucestershire. His Christian name was derived from his godfather, Robert Bell, who belonged to an old Worcestershire family. Robert Bell Wheler was educated at Stratford, and was subsequently articled to his father. He appears scarcely to have left his native town, except when he went to London for a month at the date of his formal admission as a solicitor. He practised his profession at Stratford until his death, residing continuously in a pleasant old house (Avon Croft 2), part of a mansion formerly belonging to the Clopton family, in Old Town, near the parish church.

In youth he joined the Stratford volunteer corps, and afterwards became a lieutenant and quartermaster in the 3rd regiment of Warwickshire militia, which was stationed at Stratford under Colonel Sheldon. But his main interest through life was in Shakespearean research and local topography. He had scarcely attained his majority when he published his first book, ‘The History and Antiquities of Stratford-upon-Avon,’ 1806. This accurate and careful compilation remains a standard work of reference. The eight plates illustrating the ‘History’ were engraved by F. Eginton of Birmingham from Wheler's own sketches. In 1814, was published Wheler's ‘Guide to Stratford-upon-Avon,’ a useful volume, which was reprinted in 1850. Although the ‘Guide’ excludes documents, it contains more information on some points than the ‘History.’ Wheler's last publication was a large quarto pamphlet, now very scarce, entitled ‘Historical and Descriptive Account of the Birthplace of Shakespeare’ (1829); it was illustrated with a plan and nine lithographs by C. F. Green. The work supplies an accurate and minute description of Shakespeare's birthplace as it stood in the beginning of the nineteenth century. Wheler also contributed articles, chiefly on Shakespearean subjects, to the ‘Gentleman's Magazine.’ He was a friend of Britton, author of the ‘Cathedrals of England,’ and corresponded with him.

Wheler died unmarried on 15 July 1857, and was buried beside his father in the churchyard of his native town.

Wheler left a quarto autograph manuscript volume of ‘Collectanea de Stratford.’ This, together with a portion of his library, his collection of local deeds and original documents, coins, and other relics local and Shakespearean, including a gold signet-ring believed to have belonged to Shakespeare, were given by his sister, Anne Wheler (1783–1870), to the trustees of Shakespeare's Birthplace, and are now located in the Birthplace museum. J. O. Halliwell-Phillipps privately printed a hand-list of Wheler's collections in 1863, with a biographical preface.
