= Bertrand Harris Bronson =

American academic

Bertrand Harris Bronson (June 22, 1902 – March 14, 1986) was an American academic and professor in the English department at the University of California, Berkeley.

== Biography ==
He was born on June 22, 1902, in Lawrenceville, New Jersey. After studying at the University of Michigan (A.B. 1921) and Harvard University, he spent 3 years at Oriel College, Oxford as a Rhodes Scholar and was awarded his PhD by Yale University in 1927. He then became an instructor in English at the University of California, Berkeley, receiving a promotion to Assistant Professor in 1928.

His honours while at the University of California, Berkeley included a Guggenheim Fellowship in 1943 and honorary degrees from Laval University, the University of Michigan and the University of Chicago. Bronson specialised in the works of Geoffrey Chaucer and Samuel Johnson, with his book Johnson on Shakespeare being published shortly after his death.

Bronson's The Traditional Tunes of the Child Ballads (4 vols., 1959–72) was a major contribution to ballad scholarship. In this monumental work, Bronson collected together every tune that he could find for the texts contained in Francis James Child's The English and Scottish Popular Ballads (1888–98), and published, organised and analysed them. Also of note is Bronson's preface to Child Ballads Traditional in the United States, a long-playing record issued from the Library of Congress's Music Division.

He died on March 14, 1986.
