= Lord Lovel =

English traditional song

Lord Lovel (Roud 49, Child 75) is an English-language folk ballad that exists in several variants. This ballad is originally from England, originating in the Late Middle Ages, with the oldest known versions being found in the regions of Gloucestershire, Somerset, Worcestershire, Warwickshire, and Wiltshire.

== Synopsis ==
A lord tells the lady he loves that he is going in a journey that will take several years. After a time, he longs to see her. He returns whereupon he hears of her death, and dies of grief.

The journey that Lord Lovel undertakes is possibly a pilgrimage, a quest to a holy shrine, though in some versions he is going "Foreign countries for to see, see, see". and in the version in Horace Walpole's letters he is going "To dwell in fair Scotland".

== Early versions ==
One known version was included in a letter written in 1765 by Horace Walpole to Thomas Percy, the compiler of "Reliques of Ancient English Poetry" (1765), a source for many of Child's ballads. Walpole writes "I enclose an old ballad, which I write down from memory, and perhaps very incorrectly, for it is above five and twenty years since I learned it". In Walpole's version the lady's name is Lady Hounsibelle. The song originated in the Late Middle Ages, with the oldest known versions being found in the regions of Gloucestershire, Somerset, Worcestershire, Warwickshire, and Wiltshire.

=== Broadsides and early printed versions ===
There are a number of broadside versions dating back as far as 1833. The song was included in Dixon, Ancient Poems Ballads & Songs (1846).

=== Versions collected from traditional singers ===
The Roud Folk Song Index lists 31 versions from England, mainly from southern counties; 18 from Scotland, (some Aberdeenshire singers knew the song as "Lord Lovat", and two Edinburgh singers knew it as "Lord Revel"); and 3 versions from Ireland, two under the title "Lord Levett" and one under the title "Lord Duneagle". There are 4 versions from Canada and 153 from the USA. One Kentucky version was titled "Lord Lovely".

=== Field recordings ===
There is a fine version sung by Norfolk singer Walter Pardon in 1974 in the Reg Hall collection in the British Library Sound Archive, and another sung by a Mrs. Teale of Winchcombe in 1908 to Percy Grainger. Jeannie Robertson was recorded singing "Lord Lovat" in Aberdeen in 1953, which can also be heard online.

== Variants ==
Forms of this ballad are very common in Scandinavia and Germany.

The ballads, Lord Thomas and Fair Annet and Fair Margaret and Sweet William contain some similar themes, but in those ballads, the hero is actively fickle, seeking another bride.

A closer equivalent to this ballad is Lady Alice, Child ballad 85.

Child complained that "Lord Lovel" is prone to parody: "Therefore a gross taste has taken pleasure in parodying it". A version in Roy Palmer's "A Book of British Ballads" contains this verse, describing Lord Lovel's death:

Then he flung himself down by the side of the corpse,
With a shivering gulp and a guggle,
Gave two hops, three kicks, heav'd a sigh, blew his nose.
Sung a song and then died in the struggle, the struggle,
Sung a song and then died in the struggle.,

A parody collected in Virginia starts;

Abe Lincoln stood at the White House Gate
Combing his milk-white steed,
When along came Lady Lizzie Tod,
Wishing her lover good speed, speed, speed,
Wishing her lover good speed.
