= Shakespeare's signet ring =

Ring purportedly belonging to William Shakespeare

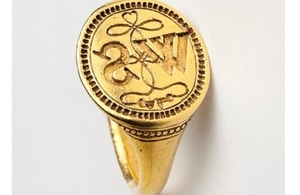
The ring

The purported Shakespeare's signet ring or seal ring, is a gold signet ring with the initials "WS". In 1810 it was found near the Holy Trinity Church, Stratford-upon-Avon, United Kingdom and may have belonged to William Shakespeare. It was donated to the Shakespeare Birthplace Trust (SBT), and is displayed at Nash's House next to New Place, Stratford-upon-Avon.

== Robert Wheler ==
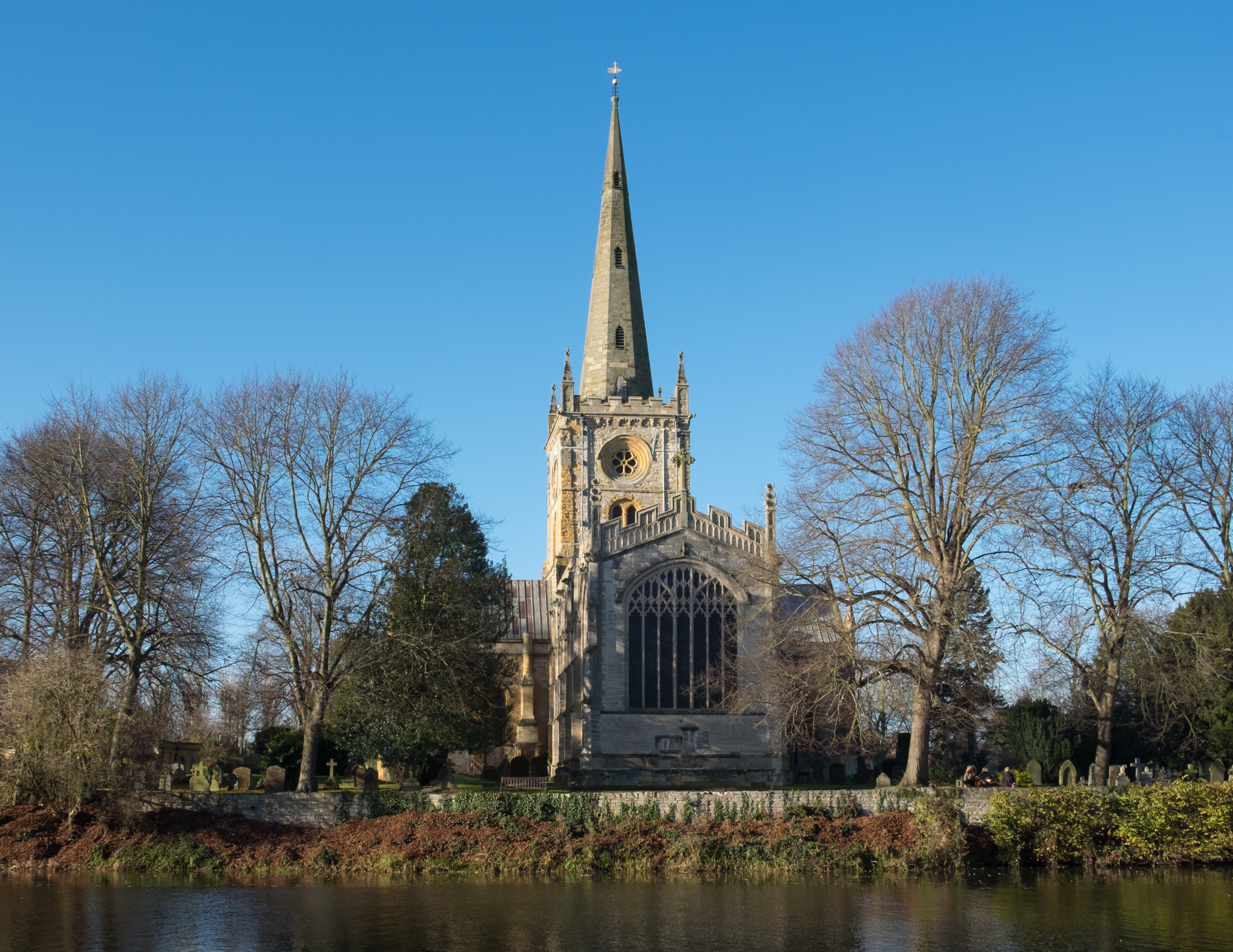
Holy Trinity Church, Stratford

According to Robert Bell Wheler, a local historian of Stratford-upon-Avon, the ring was found on Friday the 16th of March, 1810, in a field near the Holy Trinity Church in Stratford-upon-Avon, by a Mrs Martin, wife of a labourer. Immediately after her discovery, Mrs Martin took the ring to a local silversmith's shop, where it was immersed in nitric acid, in order to prove or ascertain the metal of the ring. This, says Wheler, may have destroyed the ring’s "precious aerugo", or tarnish, but it did restore the ring's original color. Word of the discovery reached Wheler, and he managed to buy the ring from Mrs Martin on the very same day, March 16. He paid her 36 shillings, which was the value of the ring's gold at the time. The ring, Wheler felt, must have been lost for "a great many years", because it appeared "nearly black" when it was discovered. Wheler noted that the ring was "of tolerably large dimensions", and he thought that it must have been an Elizabethan gentleman's ring. Similar rings, he pointed out, could be found portrayed in Elizabethan paintings and monuments. Plus the distinctive formation of the letters "W" and "S", agree with the way the letters were formed in Shakespeare's day–proof of which could be seen nearby on tombs, and in Shakespeare’s monument in the Holy Trinity Church. Wheler noticed another element the ring had of the Elizabethan style–the "union of the letters by the ornamental string and tassels", a design that could also be found along with the letters "T" and "L" on a porch ornament of Charlcote-house—a mansion located near Stratford-upon-Avon and built by Thomas Lucy. Lucy is the person said to have prosecuted young William Shakespeare for poaching deer. Wheler considered the possibility that the ring might have belonged to William Shakespeare.

Wheler felt that the only way to authenticate the ring as having belonged to Shakespeare might be to find an impression of the seal on a letter or a document signed by Shakespeare. Still later that same day, March 16, Wheler wrote a letter to The Gentlemen's Magazine, as part of his efforts to discover such a document. In his letter Wheler requested the magazine's readers to find any letters written by Shakespeare, and have them inserted into the pages of the "extensively-circulated [Gentleman’s] Magazine, with fac-similes of the signatures, and of any seals” still attached." He didn’t hint at the discovery that had been made that day, which was the reason he was asking, but he did say that for such an acquisition he was "particularly anxious". His letter received no response. In his next letter published in the Gentlemen’s Magazine, Wheler included illustrations: the seal ring, an impression made by the seal ring, and Thomas Lucy’s string-and-tassels design.

Six months later, in September 1810, and writing to the same magazine, Wheler explains the object of his previous request for Shakespearian letters: the hope of finding "an impression of my seal ring on one of them". Wheler also reports that he had located and studied a document from 1617, a year after Shakespeare had died, that listed all the people living in Stratford-upon-Avon who were assessed taxes, plus Wheler made other "numerous and continued researches into public and private documents", but he said he could not find any "Stratfordian of that period likely to own such a ring." But he pointed out, Shakespeare, who had retired from the stage, lived "in the principal house here, which he had previously purchased [and] had accumulated considerable property". Still hoping that an example of a Shakespearian document bearing an impression of the seal ring might be found, Wheler appeals to the readers of the magazine to look at the drawing of the ring (which he included) and compare it with any "impressions of seals they possess".

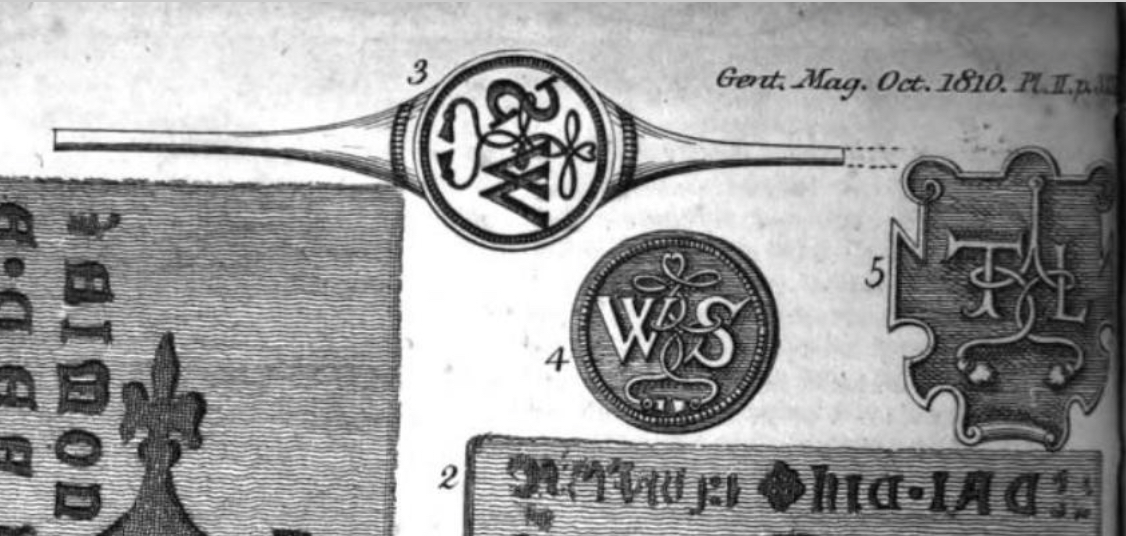
Illustrations Wheler provided (numbered 3, 4 and 5) to accompany his published letter of September 10, 1810: the seal ring found in Stratford-upon-Avon, an impression of the seal in wax, and a signet design of the letters "T" and "L" (for Thomas Lucy)

Wheler’s next step was to write a letter to Edmond Malone, the noted Shakespeare scholar and biographer. Malone wrote back on June 13, 1810. Wheler quotes Malone’s response:

I have not in my possession, nor have I ever seen any letter written by Shakspeare [sic]; nor have I an impression of any seal of his. I am unable, therefore, to furnish any document that can throw a light on the ancient seal-ring which you have lately acquired.

Wheler concludes in an article from his 1814 publication A Guide to Stratford-upon-Avon: "At present, I have no positive proof whatever. … I yet hope to meet with an impression of the ring in my possession, and in this I am more particularly encouraged by the fact, that should success attend the investigation, this seal-ring would be the only existing article proved to have originally belonged to our immortal poet."

== Shakespeare Birthplace Trust ==
After Wheler's death, his sister Anne donated it to the Shakespeare Birthplace Trust (SBT). It is on display in the exhibition at Nash's House, next to New Place, Stratford-upon-Avon.

== Description ==
The signet ring is in the style of such a ring for a wealthy man of the Elizabethan era. It is made of gold and is somewhat heavy – weighing about 18 grams. The face (bezel) has the initials "WS", reversed for use as a seal stamp. Combined with the letters is a knotted rope. Above the letters the rope forms a true lover's knot with 4 loops, the topmost one in the shape of a heart. Between the letters it forms a Bowen knot. The rope's ends below the letters have tassels. The ring has a width of 19 mm and a height of 16 mm.

== Speculation ==
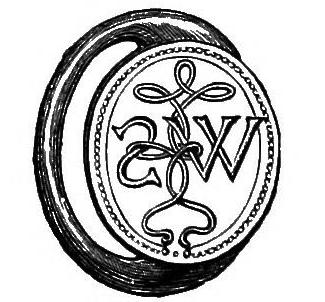
Drawing of the ring, 1884

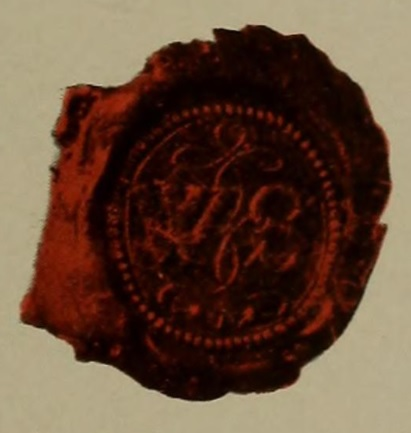
Wax impression, 1917

No seal impressions by William Shakespeare are preserved, but it is possible that the ring belonged to him. Wheler thought so, and that it had been Shakespeare's wedding ring. He saw no other plausible owner. Wheler consulted Shakespearean scholar Edmond Malone, who mentioned as an alternative William Smith (c.1550–1618), another wealthy Stratfordian. However, Smith's seal is known and of a different design.

It is also possible that the ring was a gift from "WS" to a friend, or for the use of a business representative. Author Charles Edwards suggests that it was a gift to William from his wife Anne. Shakespearean scholar E. K. Chambers posits that W and S could be two different people, but this idea doesn't fit with the purpose of a signet ring.

Scholars have suggested that Shakespeare could have lost the ring at his daughter Judith's wedding at the Holy Trinity Church in 1616. A possible indication of this is a correction made in Shakespeare's will, written the same year. Where it had originally read "whereof I have hereunto put my hand and seal" near the end, "and seal" has been struck.

Another signet ring with the initials WS was kept by the English 18th century actor David Garrick in his Temple to Shakespeare.

== Merchandising ==
In 2016, the SBT licensed the making of a version of the ring for sale to a Stratford jeweller firm. According to the jeweller, these rings were made with the same gold alloy as the original. Other SBT merchandise based on the ring include pendants and fridge magnets. As of 2016, the ring's design was used on packaging of SBT merchandise.

== In fiction ==
In Graham Holderness' story "The Adventure of Shakespeare's Ring", the ring is stolen and the theft investigated by Sherlock Holmes. The thief is Oscar Wilde, who wanted it because he believed it was a love token given to Shakespeare by Henry Wriothesley, Earl of Southampton.

== See also ==
- Shakespeare coat of arms
