= Barbara Allen (song) =

Traditional ballad

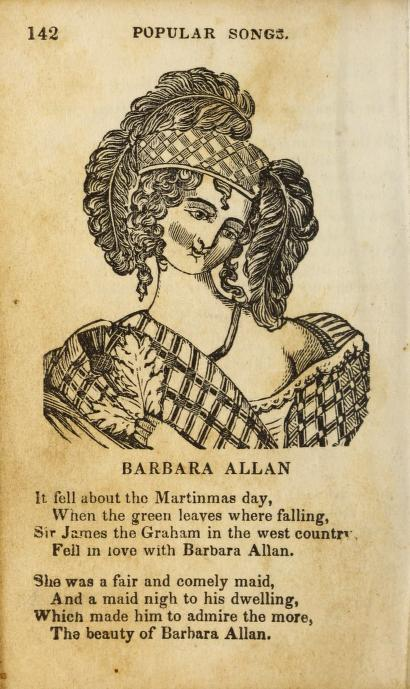
- Song lyrics published 1840 in the Forget Me Not Songster

Song
- Published: 17th century (earliest known)
- Genre: Broadside ballad, folksong
- Songwriter: Unknown

"Barbara Allen" (Child 84, Roud 54) is a traditional British folk song that is popular throughout the English-speaking world and beyond. It tells of how the eponymous character denies a dying man's love, then dies of grief soon after his untimely death.

The song began as a ballad in the seventeenth century or earlier, before quickly spreading (both orally and in print) throughout Britain and Ireland and later North America. Ethnomusicologists Steve Roud and Julia Bishop described it as "far and away the most widely collected song in the English language—equally popular in England, Scotland and Ireland, and with hundreds of versions collected over the years in North America."

As with most folk songs, "Barbara Allen" has been published and performed under many different titles, including "The Ballet of Barbara Allen", "Barbara Allen's Cruelty", "Barbarous Ellen", "Edelin", "Hard Hearted Barbary Ellen", "Sad Ballet Of Little Johnnie Green", "Sir John Graham", "Bonny Barbara Allan", "Barbry Allen" among others.

== Synopsis ==
The ballad generally follows a standard plot, although narrative details vary between versions.

- A servant asks Barbara to attend on his sick master.
- She visits the bedside of the heartbroken young man, who then pleads for her love.
- She refuses, claiming he had slighted her while drinking with friends.
- He dies soon after and Barbara hears his funeral bells tolling; stricken with grief, she dies as well.
- They are buried in the same churchyard; a rose grows from his grave, a briar from hers, and the plants form a true lovers' knot.

== History ==
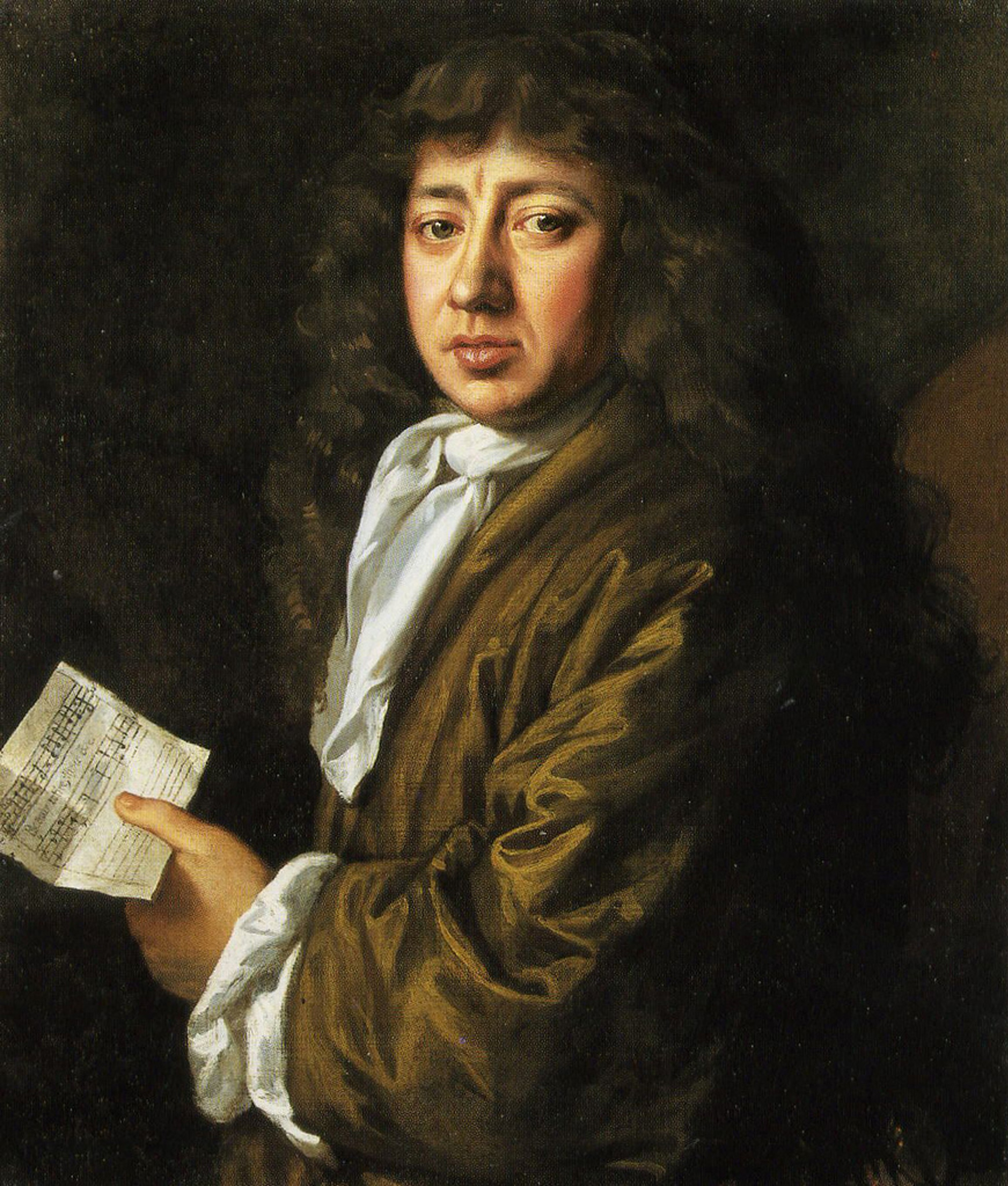
Samuel Pepys

A diary entry by Samuel Pepys on 2 January 1666 contains the earliest extant reference to the song. In it, he recalls the fun and games at a New Years party:

...but above all, my dear Mrs Knipp, with whom I sang; and in perfect pleasure I was to hear her sing, and especially her little Scotch song of Barbary Allen.

From this, Steve Roud and Julia Bishop have inferred the song was popular at that time, suggesting that it may have been written for stage performance, as Elizabeth Knepp was a professional actress, singer, and dancer. However, the folklorists Phillips Barry and Fannie Hardy Eckstorm were of the opinion that the song "was not a stage song at all but a libel on Barbara Villiers and her relations with Charles II". Charles Seeger points out that Pepys' delight at hearing a libelous song about the King's mistress was perfectly in character.

In 1792, the renowned Austrian composer Joseph Haydn arranged "Barbara Allen" as one of over 400 folk song arrangements commissioned by George Thomson and the publishers William Napier and William Whyte. He probably took the melody from James Oswald's Caledonian Pocket Companion, c.1750.

=== Early printed versions ===
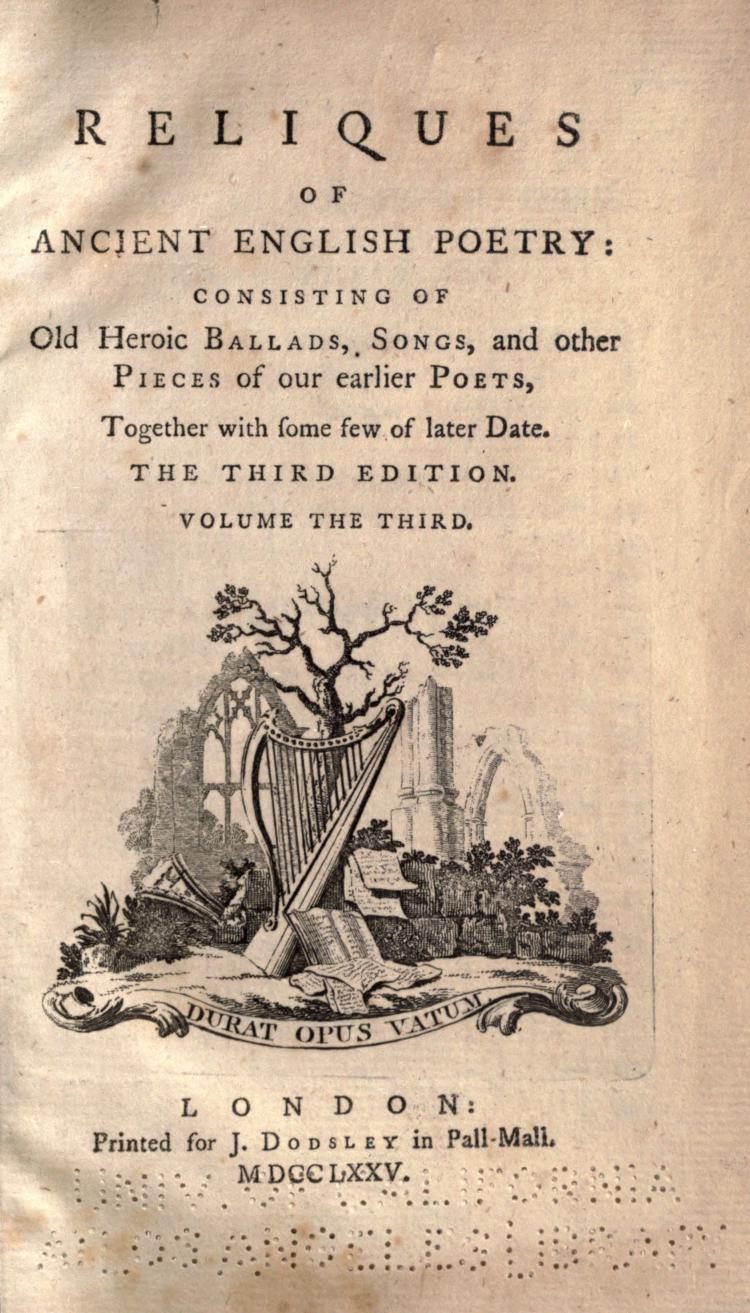
Reliques of Ancient English Poetry

One 1690 broadside of the song was published in London under the title "Barbara Allen's cruelty: or, the young-man's tragedy" (see lyrics below). With Barbara Allen's [l]amentation for her unkindness to her lover, and her self".

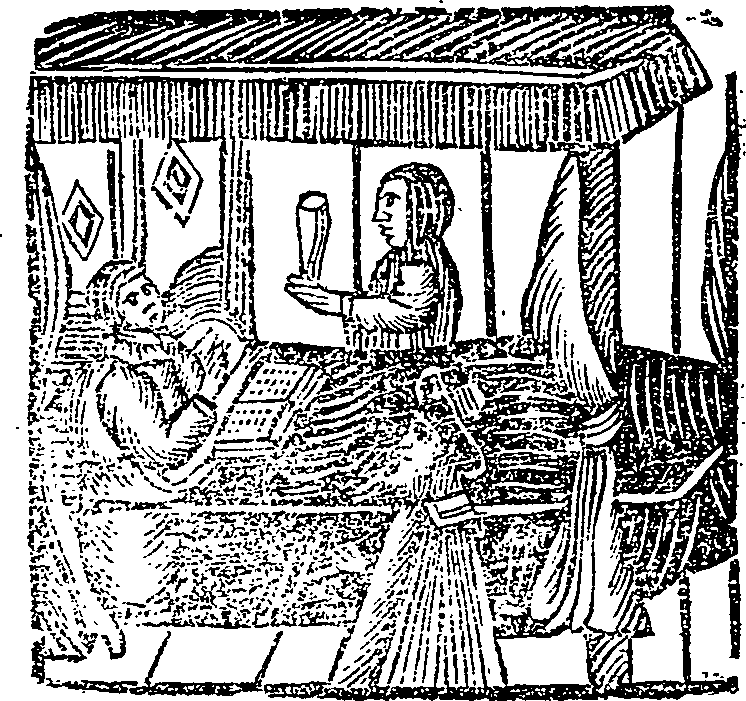
Illustration printed c.1760, London

Additional printings were common in Britain throughout the eighteenth century. Scottish poet Allan Ramsay published "Bonny Barbara Allen" in his Tea-Table Miscellany published in 1740. Soon after, Thomas Percy published two similar renditions in his 1765 collection Reliques of Ancient English Poetry under the titles "Barbara Allen's Cruelty" and "Sir John Grehme and Barbara Allen". Ethnomusicologist Francis James Child compiled these renditions together in the nineteenth century with several others found in the Roxburghe Ballads to create his A and B standard versions, used by later scholars as a reference.

The ballad was first printed in the United States in 1836. Many variations of the song continued to be printed on broadsides in the United States through the 19th and 20th centuries. Throughout New England, for example, it was passed orally and spread by inclusion in songbooks and newspaper columns, along with other popular ballads such as "The Farmer's Curst Wife" and "The Golden Vanity".

The popularity of printed versions meant that lyrics from broadsides greatly influenced traditional singers; various collected versions can be traced back to different broadsides.

=== Traditional recordings ===
According to the Vaughan Williams Memorial Library, approximately 500 traditional recordings of the song have been made. The earliest recording of the song is probably a 1907 wax cylinder recording by composer and musicologist Percy Grainger of the Lincolnshire folk singer Joseph Taylor, which was digitised by the British Library and can now be heard online via the British Library Sound Archive. Other authentic recordings include those of African American Hule "Queen" Hines of Florida (1939), Welshman Phil Tanner (1949), Irishwoman Elizabeth Cronin (early 1950s), Norfolk folk-singer Sam Larner (1958), and Appalachian folk singer Jean Ritchie (1961). Charles Seeger edited a collection released by the Library of Congress entitled Versions and Variants of Barbara Allen from the Archive of Folk Song as part of its series Folk Music of the United States. The record compiled 30 versions of the ballad, recorded from 1933 to 1954 in the United States.

== Lyrics ==
"Barbara Allen's cruelty: or, the young-man's tragedy" (c.1690), the earliest "Barbara Allen" text:

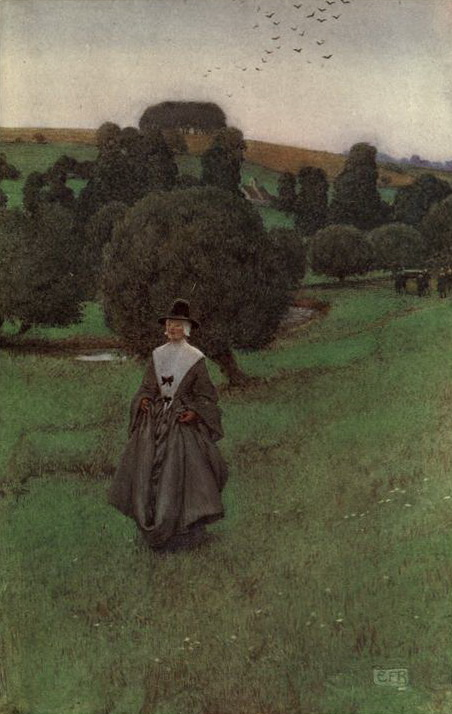
Cruel Barbara Allen by Eleanor Fortescue-Brickdale (1920)

In Scarlet Town, where I was bound,
There was a fair maid dwelling,
Whom I had chosen to be my own,
And her name it was Barbara Allen.

All in the merry month of May,
When green leaves they was springing,
This young man on his death-bed lay,
For the love of Barbara Allen.

He sent his man unto her then,
To the town where she was dwelling:
'You must come to my master dear,
If your name be Barbara Allen.

'For death is printed in his face,
And sorrow's in him dwelling,
And you must come to my master dear,
If your name be Barbara Allen.'

'If death be printed in his face,
And sorrow's in him dwelling,
Then little better shall he be
For bonny Barbara Allen.'

So slowly, slowly she got up,
And so slowly she came to him,
And all she said when she came there,
Young man, I think you are a dying.

He turnd his face unto her then:
'If you be Barbara Allen,
My dear,' said he, 'Come pitty me,
As on my death-bed I am lying.'

'If on your death-bed you be lying,
What is that to Barbara Allen?
I cannot keep you from [your] death;
So farewell,' said Barbara Allen.

He turnd his face unto the wall,
And death came creeping to him:
'Then adieu, adieu, and adieu to all,
And adieu to Barbara Allen!'

And as she was walking on a day,
She heard the bell a ringing,
And it did seem to ring to her
'Unworthy Barbara Allen.'

She turnd herself round about,
And she spy'd the corps a coming:
'Lay down, lay down the corps of clay,
That I may look upon him.'

And all the while she looked on,
So loudly she lay laughing,
While all her friends cry'd [out] amain,
'Unworthy Barbara Allen!'

When he was dead, and laid in grave,
Then death came creeping to she:
'O mother, mother, make my bed,
For his death hath quite undone me.

'A hard-hearted creature that I was,
To slight one that lovd me so dearly;
I wish I had been more kinder to him,
The time of his life when he was near me.'

So this maid she then did dye,
And desired to be buried by him,
And repented her self before she dy'd,
That ever she did deny him.

== Variations ==
The lyrics are nowhere near as varied across the oral tradition as would be expected. This is because the continuous popularity of the song in print meant that variations were "corrected". Nonetheless, American folklorist Harry Smith was known to, as a party trick, ask people to sing a verse of the song, after which he would tell what county they were born in.

=== Setting ===
The setting is sometimes "Scarlet Town". This may be a punning reference to Reading, as a slip-song version c. 1790 among the Madden songs at Cambridge University Library has 'In Reading town, where I was bound.' London town and Dublin town are used in other versions.

The ballad often opens by establishing a festive time frame, such as May, Martinmas, or Lammas. The versions which begin by mentioning "Martinmas Time" and others which begin with "Early early in the spring" are thought to be the oldest and least corrupted by more recent printed versions.

The Martinmas variants, most common in Scotland, are probably older than the Scarlet Town variants, which presumably originated in the south of England. Around half of all American versions take place in the month of May; these versions are the most diverse, as they appear to have existed within the oral tradition rather than on broadsides.

After the setting is established, a dialogue between the two characters generally follows.

=== Protagonists ===
The dying man is called Sir John Graeme in the earliest known printings. American versions of the ballad often call him some variation of William, James, or Jimmy; his last name may be specified as Grove, Green, Grame, or another.

=== Symbolism and parallels ===
The song often concludes with poetic motif of a rose growing from his grave and a brier from hers forming a "true lovers' knot", which symbolises their fidelity in love even after death. This motif is paralleled in several ballads including "Lord Thomas and Fair Annet", "Lord Lovel", and "Fair Margaret and Sweet William". However, the ballad lacks many of the common phrases found in ballads of similar ages (e.g. mounting a "milk white steed and a dapple" grey), possibly because the strong story and imagery means these cliches are not required.

== Melody ==
A vast array of tunes were traditionally used for "Barbara Allen". Many American versions are pentatonic and without a clear tonic note, such as the Ritchie family version. English versions are more rooted in the major mode. The minor-mode Scottish tune seems to be the oldest, as it is the version found in James Oswald's Caledonian Pocket Companion which was written in the mid-1700s. That tune survived in the oral tradition in Scotland until the twentieth century; a version sung by a Mrs. Ann Lyell (1869–1945) collected by James Madison Carpenter from in the 1930s can be heard on the Vaughan Williams Memorial Library website, and Ewan MacColl recorded a version learned from his mother Betsy Miller. Whilst printed versions of the lyrics influenced the versions performed by traditional singers, the tunes were rarely printed so they are thought to have been passed on from person to person through the centuries and evolved more organically.

== Popular arrangements and commercial recordings ==
Roger Quilter wrote an arrangement in 1921, dedicated to the noted Irish baritone Frederick Ranalow, who had become famous for his performance as Macheath in The Beggar's Opera at the Lyric Theatre, Hammersmith. Quilter set each verse differently, using countermelodies as undercurrents. An octave B with a bare fifth tolls like a bell in the fourth verse. A short piano interlude before the fifth verse was commented on favourably by Percy Grainger. Quilter later incorporated the setting in his Arnold Book of Old Songs, rededicated to his late nephew Arnold Guy Vivian, and published in 1950.

Baritone vocalist Royal Dadmun released a version in 1922 on Victor Records. The song is credited to the arrangers, Eaton Faning and John Liptrot Hatton. British composer Florence Margaret Spencer Palmer published Variations on Barbara Allen for piano in 1923.

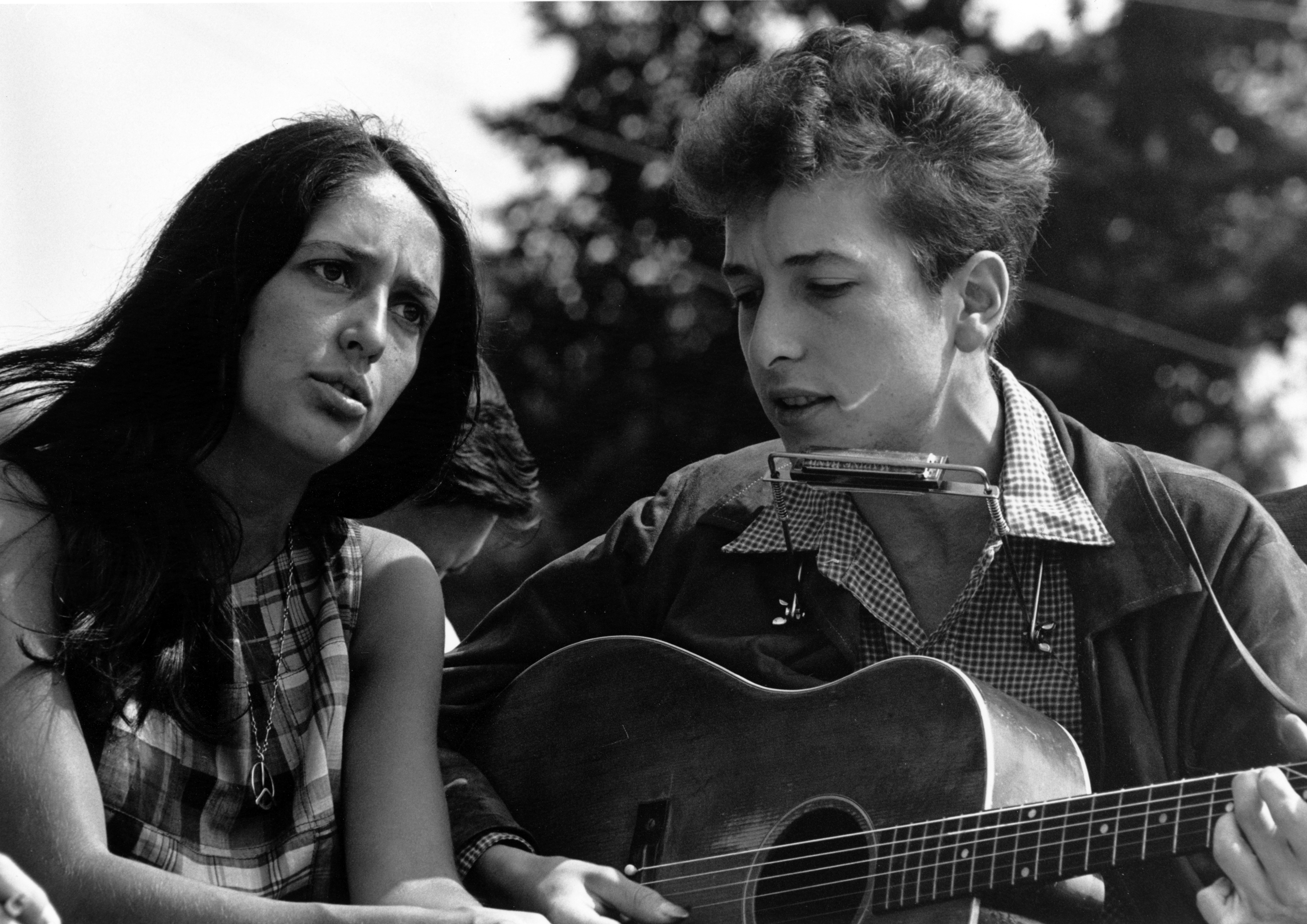
Joan Baez and Bob Dylan

Versions of the song were recorded in the 1950s and '60s by folk revivalists, including Pete Seeger. Eddy Arnold recorded and released a version on his 1955 album "Wanderin'". The Everly Brothers recorded and released a version on their 1958 folk album, "Songs Our Daddy Taught Us". Joan Baez released a version in 1961, the same year as Jean Ritchie's recording. Bob Dylan said that folk songs were highly influential on him, writing in a poem that "[w]ithout "Barbara Allen there'd be no 'Girl from the North Country'; Dylan performed a live eight-minute rendition in 1962 which was subsequently released on Live at The Gaslight 1962.

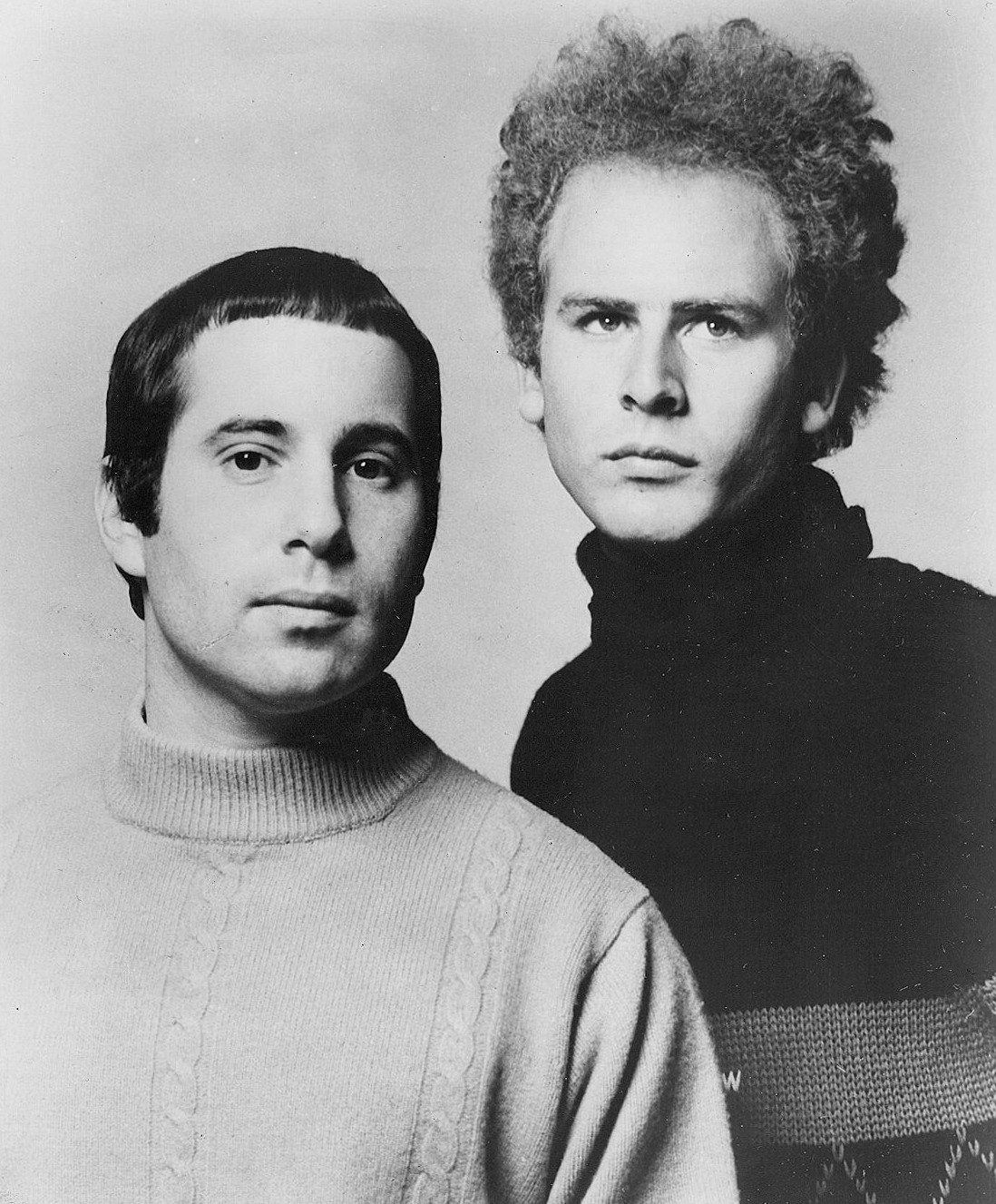
Simon and Garfunkel

The demo of the ballad recorded by Simon and Garfunkel appears on their anthology album The Columbia Studio Recordings (1964-1970) and a bonus track on the 2001 edition of their album Sounds of Silence as "Barbriallen", and by Art Garfunkel alone in 1973 on his album Angel Clare.

June Tabor, the English folk singer includes the song as "Barbry Allen" on her 2001 album Rosa Mundi. Angelo Branduardi recorded this song as Barbrie Allen resp. Barbriallen on his two music albums Così è se mi pare – EP " and Il Rovo e la rosa in Italian. On his French EN FRANÇAIS – BEST OF compilation in 2015 he sang this song in French-adaption written by Carla Bruni.

== Popular culture adaptations and references ==
The song has been adapted and retold in numerous non-musical contexts. In the early twentieth century, the American writer Robert E. Howard wove verses of the song into a civil war ghost story that was posthumously published under the title "For the Love of Barbara Allen". Howard Richardson and William Berney's 1942 stage play Dark of the Moon is based on the ballad, as a reference to the influence of English, Irish and Scottish folktales and songs in Appalachia. It was also retold as a radio drama on the program Suspense, which aired 20 October 1952, and was entitled "The Death of Barbara Allen" with Anne Baxter in the titular role. A British radio play titled Barbara Allen featured Honeysuckle Weeks and Keith Barron; it was written by David Pownall and premiered on BBC Radio 7 on 16 February 2009.

The song has also been sampled, quoted, and featured as a dramatic device in numerous films, notably in A Love Song for Bobby Long (2004).
