= All Jolly Fellows that Follow the Plough =

English folk song

- English Folk Song by Unknown
- Catalogue: Roud 346
- Text: Traditional
- Published: 1800s: England

"All Jolly Fellows that Follow the Plough" (Roud 346) or The Ploughman's Song is an English folk song about the working life of horsemen on an English farm in the days before petrol-driven machinery. Variants have been collected from many traditional singers - Cecil Sharp observed that "almost every singer knows it: the bad singers often know but little else". It has been recorded by many singers influenced by the second British folk revival.

== Synopsis ==
The narrator describes how he and his fellow-workers are woken at four in the morning by their farmer master:

Twas early one morning at the break of the day
The cocks were all crowing and the farmer did say,
'Come rise my good fellows, come rise with good-will.
Your horses want something their bellies to fill',

The ploughboys feed and groom their horses, then after breakfast lead their horses to the fields to plough taking some food with them. Each ploughboy is expected to plough an acre (0.4 hectares) each day. At 2 'clock the farmer comes to the field and pretends to scold his men:

'What have you been doing, boys, all this long day?
You've not ploughed an acre, I swear and I vow.
You're all idle fellows that follow the plough'.

The ploughboy narrator stands up to this accusation: "'We've all ploughed our acre, so you've told a damn lie'". The farmer laughs at his joke, tells the ploughboys "'It's time to unyoke'" and promises them "a jug of my very best ale" when they've taken care of their horses. The song ends with an exhortation to other ploughboys not to be afraid of their masters and the narrator tells them "You're all jolly fellows that follow the plough".

== Early versions ==
=== Broadsides and early printed versions ===
There are 11 broadside versions of this song in the Bodleian Broadside Collection, with an earliest possible date of 1813. Most lack the first verse quoted above. The Roud Broadside Index lists 20 publishers from all over England and one from Scotland who printed the song.

A text of the song is included with other songs sung by members of the National Agricultural Labourers' Union in a contemporary book about industrial agitation in 1874.

=== Versions collected from traditional singers ===
This song was well known and loved in rural areas from the early nineteenth to the end of the twentieth century, and features in many if not all collections of English folk songs. There are around one hundred versions collected in England that are listed in the Roud Folk Song Index, with examples collected from 27 counties from Cornwall to Cumbria. The main areas missing are Kent, the East Midlands and the North East. Four versions were collected from Scotland.

=== Variants ===
An adaptation titled "Come all you bold fellows that follow the plough" was used as a recruiting song for Joseph Arch's National Agricultural Labourers' Union. Places named in the song are in Somerset.

The poet John Clare wrote a two stanza poem which seems to have been influenced by the song. It describes the ploughman's life in more lyrical terms. Each stanza has six lines, but it uses the same metre and the final line of each stanza contains the phrase "All jolly fellows that follow the plough". It was written between 1832 and 1837.

== Recordings ==
=== Field recordings ===
Some recordings are available online at the British Library Sound Archive, including renditions by Maurice Ogg, singing in his home in Lincolnshire and recorded by Roy Palmer around 1979; a version by George Belton from Suffolk, recorded in a pub session in the early 1970s by Keith Summers; and one by Norman Hall, a singer from Oxfordshire recorded by Bob Patten in Exeter, Devon in 1996. Gloucestershire singer Howard Pritchett was recorded singing this song in 1962.

Some field recordings have been released by specialist record companies. These include versions by Tony Harvey (Suffolk), Jeff Wesley (Northamptonshire), Gordon Syrett (Suffolk), May Bradley(Shropshire) Fred Jordan (Shropshire) and Bob Hart(Suffolk).

=== Recordings by revival singers and groups ===
Though "We're All Jolly Fellows" is sung commonly in folk clubs it doesn't seem to have been recorded frequently by revival-influenced artists. There are CD versions by Oxford group Magpie Lane and Barnsley singer Kate Rusby (as Jolly Ploughboys)

== Discussion ==
According to Ian Dyck the song was sung in the early nineteenth century at Harvest Homes, feasts held at the end of the harvest, a significant event in the rural calendar when farmers sat on one table with their servants, including the ploughboys.

Mike Yates points out that this is more than a song in praise of the farm labourer's life: "Over the years I have been forcibly struck many times by the way in which middle-class Edwardian folksong collectors misinterpreted the beliefs and feelings of the people from whom they collected songs. Take for example the song We're All Jolly Fellows Who Follow the Plough, which is, on the surface, a simple enough song in praise of farm labour. In the mid-70's, while collecting in Sussex, two independent singers told me that they would sing this song at harvest suppers. It would be not only for the benefit of local dignitaries and guests of honour (often townspeople), but also for their fellow workers who were well aware that the song was not about a carefree country existence, but a medium for expressing all that was wrong in society. Despite what the farm owners might think, their workers were not jolly fellows. They did not enjoy rising at dawn to work all day in a wet plough field, and they were not happy about their employer's paternalism." The ploughboy in the song stands up to his master, and urges others to do the same.
