= Jamie Raeburn =

"Jamie Raeburn" is a traditional Scottish song about penal transportation. Jamie Raeburn is reputed to have been a baker in Glasgow before being sentenced for petty theft, although he was allegedly innocent, and then sent out to the colonies as punishment.

According to the National Library of Scotland the lyrics to the song were probably published between 1840 and 1850.

In Robert Ford's 'Vagabond Songs and Ballads of Scotland: With Many Old and Familiar Melodies' (1901) he writes the following in relation to the song:

The above was long a popular street song all over Scotland and sold readily in penny sheet form. The hero of the verses, in whose mouth the words are put, I recently learned on enquiry, through the columns of the Glasgow Evening Times was a baker to trade who was sentenced to banishment for theft more than sixty years ago. His sweetheart, Catherine Chandlier, thus told the story of his misfortunes: "We parted at ten o'clock and Jamie was in the police office at 20 minutes past ten. Going home, he met an acquaintance of his boyhood, who took him in to treat him for auld langsyne. Scarcely had they entered when the detectives appeared and apprehended them. Searched, the stolen property was found. They were tried and banished for life to Botany Bay. Jamie was innocent as the unborn babe, but his heartless companion spoke not a word of his innocence.

A number of folk artists, predominantly Scottish, have recorded versions of the song.
