= Fair Margaret and Sweet William =

Traditional song

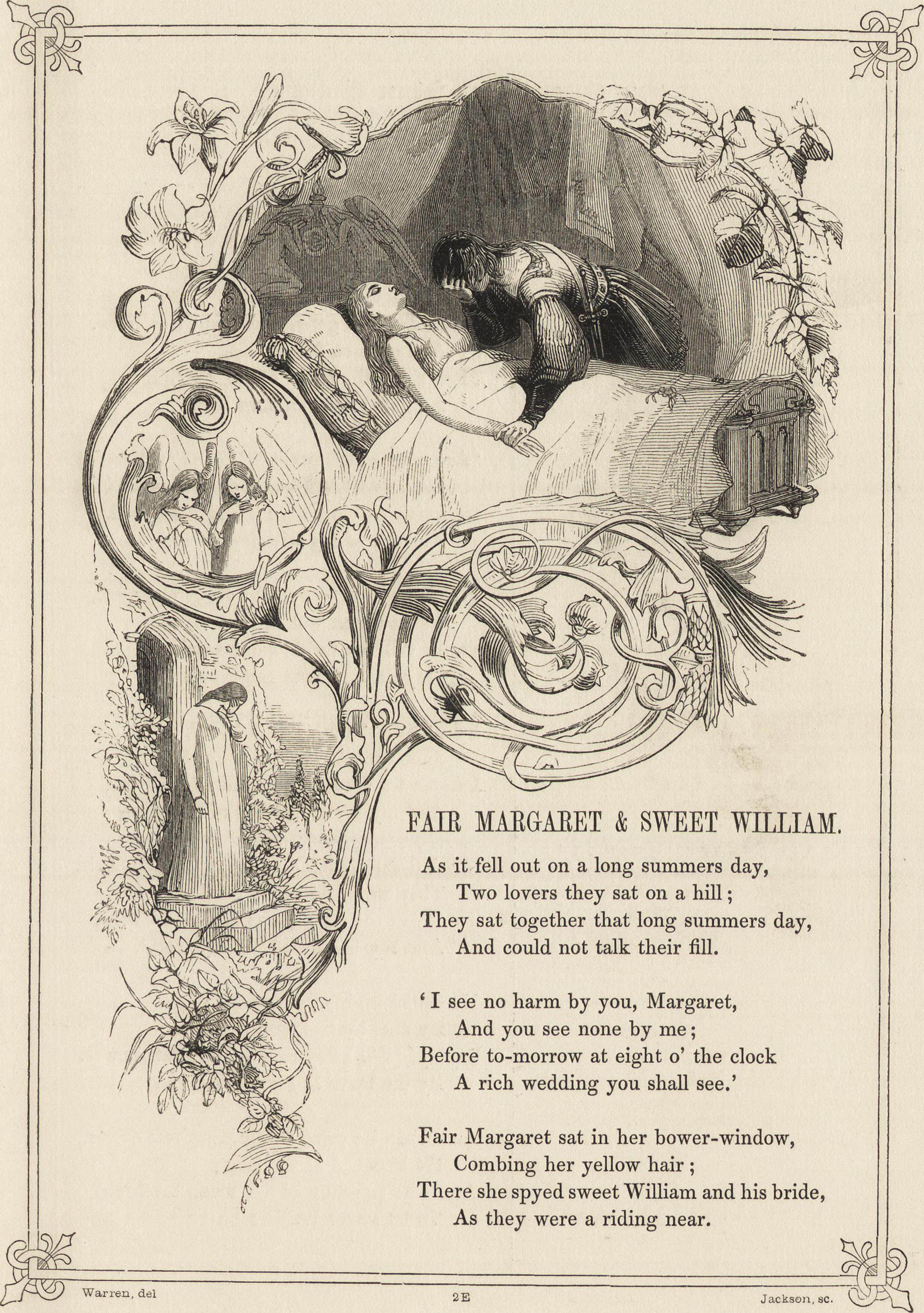
Fair Margaret & Sweet William from The Book of British ballads (1842)

"Fair Margaret and Sweet William" (Child 74, Roud 253) is a traditional English ballad which tells of two lovers, one or both of whom die from heartbreak. Thomas Percy included it in his 1765 Reliques and said that it was quoted as early as 1611 in the Knight of the Burning Pestle. In the United States, variations of Fair Margaret were regarded as folk song as early as 1823.

== Synopsis ==
Fair Margaret espies the marriage procession of her lover Sweet William and another woman from her high chamber window. Depending on the variation, Margaret either commits suicide or dies of a broken heart. Her ghost then appears before Sweet William to ask him if he loves his new bride more than herself, and William replies he loves Margaret better. In the morning, William commences to search for Margaret. Upon arriving at her estate, Margaret's family shows William the corpse. In some versions, Sweet William dies of heartbreak as well, and they are buried beside each other.

== Variations and related ballads ==
Regional and printed variations of the ballad are known by many titles, including "Lady Margaret and Sweet William", "Pretty Polly and Sweet William", "Sweet William's Bride", "Lady Margaret's Ghost", "Fair Margaret's Misfortune", and "William and Margaret", among others. Numerous variations on this basic structure can be found in folk songs throughout the British Isles and United States. Renowned folklorist Francis James Child identified three distinct versions of the lyrics, whilst Cecil Sharp collected numerous other variants, considering the ballad "Sweet William's Ghost" (Child 77) to be a slight variation on the basic plot.

Traditional versions of Fair Margaret sometimes end with a "rose-briar motif" of several stanzas describing floral growth on the lovers' neighboring graves. This motif is featured in other ballads, including "Lord Thomas and Fair Annet", "Lord Lovel", and "Barbara Allen". Fair Margaret also shares some mid-song stanzas with the murder ballad "Matty Groves" (Child ballad 81, Roud 52).

== Traditional recordings ==
In the United States traditional Appalachian musicians such as Bascom Lamar Lunsford (1953) and Jean Ritchie (1956) recorded their family versions of the ballad, as did many Ozark performers such as Almeda Riddle of Arkansas (1972). Helen Hartness Flanders collected several versions of the song throughout New England in the 1930s and 1940s, which she heard performed to five different melodies.

In England several versions were collected across the country, but the ballad appears to have largely died out before recordings could be made. Cecil Sharp collected some versions in Somerset around 1910, and Frank Kidson collected a single version in Knaresborough, Yorkshire in 1906. In Scotland, the only recording was a fragment sung by a Mabel Skelton of Arbroath to Hamish Henderson in 1985, which is available on the Tobar an Dualchais website. Likewise, only a single version has been recorded in Ireland, that of Martin Howley of County Clare, which can be heard online courtesy of the County Clare Library.
