= Reg Hall =

Australian rules footballer (1932–2013)

Personal information
- Full name: Reginald Harry Hall
- Nickname: Nippy number 2
- Born: 20 March 1932
- Died: 6 August 2013 (aged 81)
- Height: 166 cm (5 ft 5 in)
- Weight: 64 kg (141 lb)

Playing career^{1}
Years	Club	Games (Goals)
1953–1955	Richmond	26 (6)
- ^{1} Playing statistics correct to the end of 1955.

Reg Hall (20 March 1932 – 6 August 2013) was a former Australian rules footballer who played with Richmond in the Victorian Football League (VFL) and for East Perth in Western Australian Football League (WAFL)

While playing football for Central Districts in the Metropolitan Juniors competition in 1951, Hall won the best and fairest award, the 'Caris Brothers Medal'.

At the end of the season, he moved to Melbourne to play for Richmond. He applied for a clearance which was approved by East Perth, but the application was rejected by the WANFL, who had adopted a ‘no clearance’ policy for young players wanting to play in Victoria. It meant he had to stand out of football for 1952 to gain clearance, and bided his time playing for Sunday League club West Melbourne to keep match fit. Eventually the clearance came and he debuted for the Tigers against Collingwood late in the season.

He played for three seasons for the Tigers before returning home to East Perth for the 1956 season. Jack Sheedy had just been appointed coach of East Perth, and 1956 was to be the beginning of another successful era for the Royals and Hall played for two premiership sides in 1958 and 1959.

Hall's occupation was as a racquet stringer and this eventually led to him opening a sporting goods store in Osborne Park in 1976 that specialised in racquet sports.
