= Child Ballads =

Collection of traditional ballads

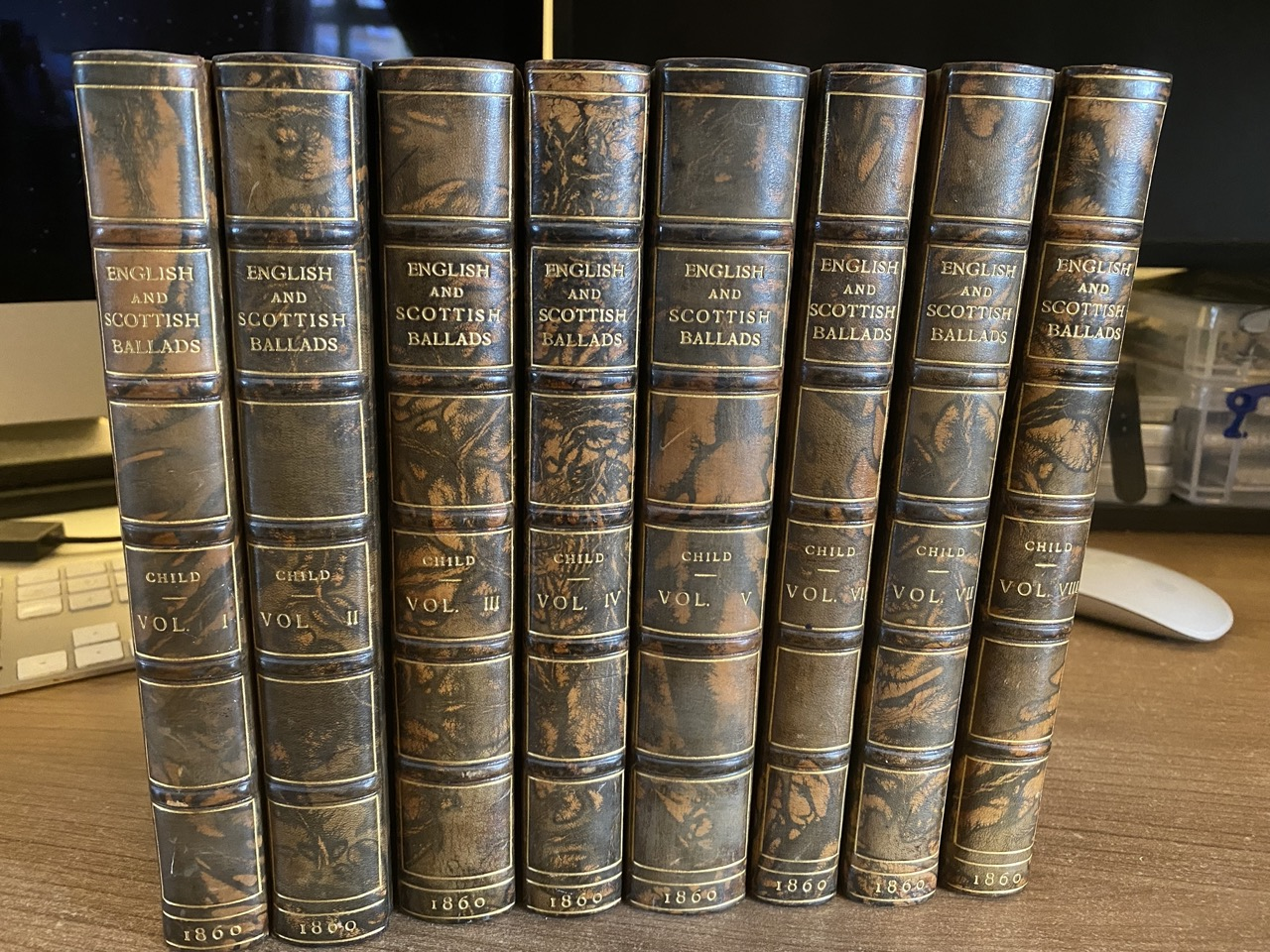
- 8 Volume collection of Francis Child English & Scottish Ballads, 1860
- Author: Francis James Child
- Language: English
- Subject: Folklore ballads from Antiquity/Medieval Europe
- Genre: Traditional/Folk Ballad
- Publication date: 1882; 144 years ago
- Publication place: United States

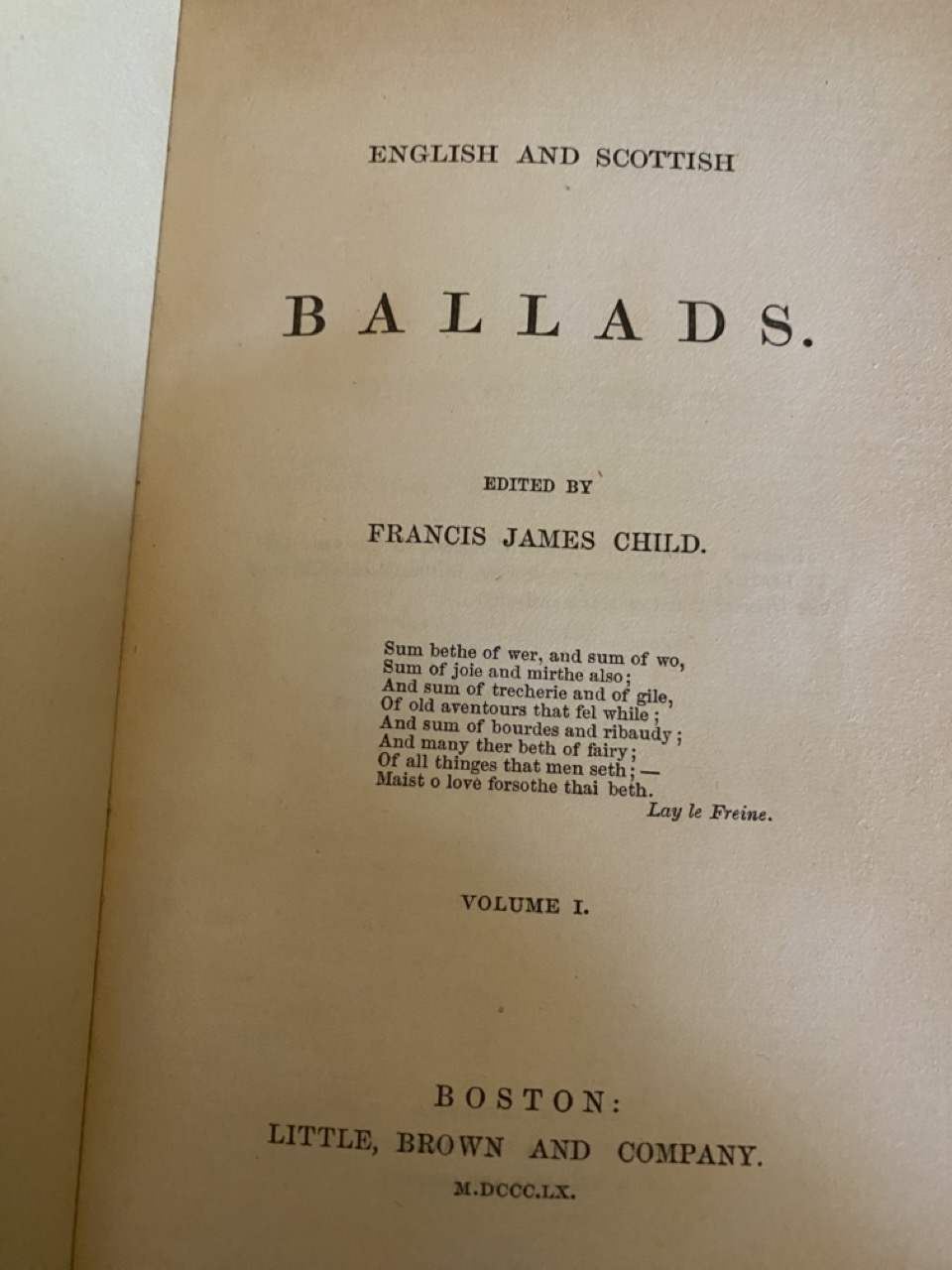
Francis Child English & Scottish Ballads, 1860, Vol 1

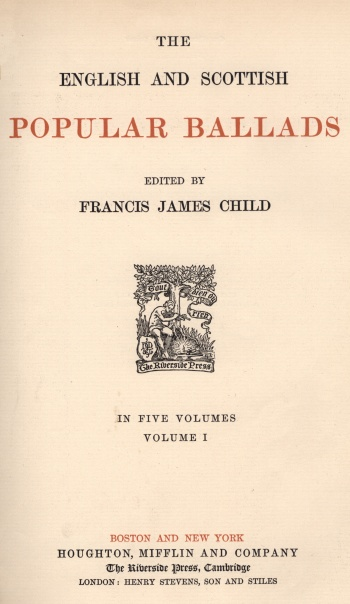
The 1904 Houghton Mifflin edition of Child's English and Scottish Popular Ballads

The Child Ballads are 305 traditional ballads from England and Scotland, and their American variants, anthologized by Francis James Child during the second half of the 19th century. Their lyrics and Child's studies of them were published as The English and Scottish Popular Ballads. The tunes of most of the ballads were collected and published by Bertrand Harris Bronson in and around the 1960s.

== History ==
=== Age and source of the ballads ===
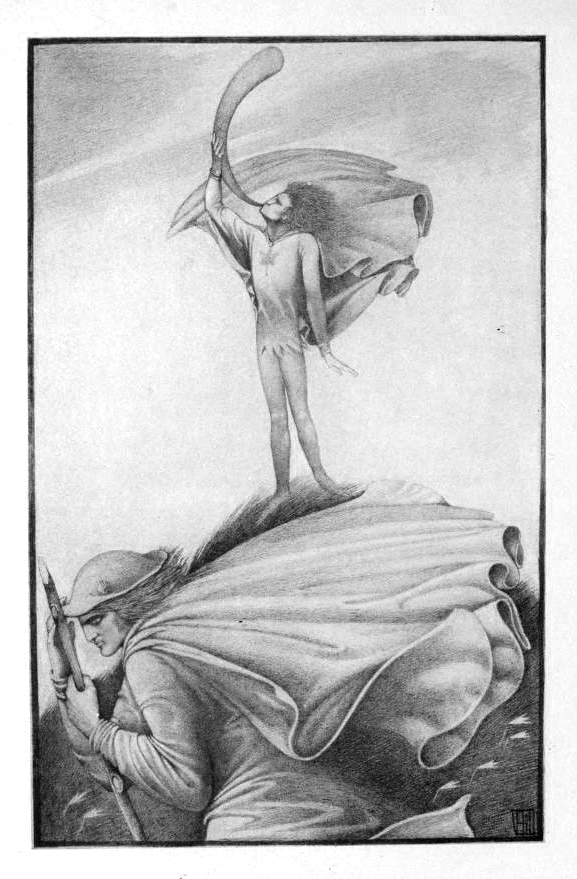
Illustration by Vernon Hill of Child Ballad 2, The Elfin Knight

The ballads vary in age; for instance, the manuscript of "Judas" dates to the thirteenth century and a version of "A Gest of Robyn Hode" was printed in the late fifteenth or early sixteenth century. The majority of the ballads, however, date to the seventeenth and eighteenth centuries. Although some are claimed to have very ancient influences, only a handful can be definitively traced to before 1600. Moreover, few of the tunes collected are as old as the words. Nevertheless, Child's collection was far more comprehensive than any previous collection of ballads in English.

Many of Child's ballads were obtained from printed broadsides, but he generally distinguished the "traditional" ballads that interested him from later broadside ballads. As Child died before writing a commentary on his work, it is uncertain exactly how and why he selected some ballads and discounted others.

=== Editorial history ===
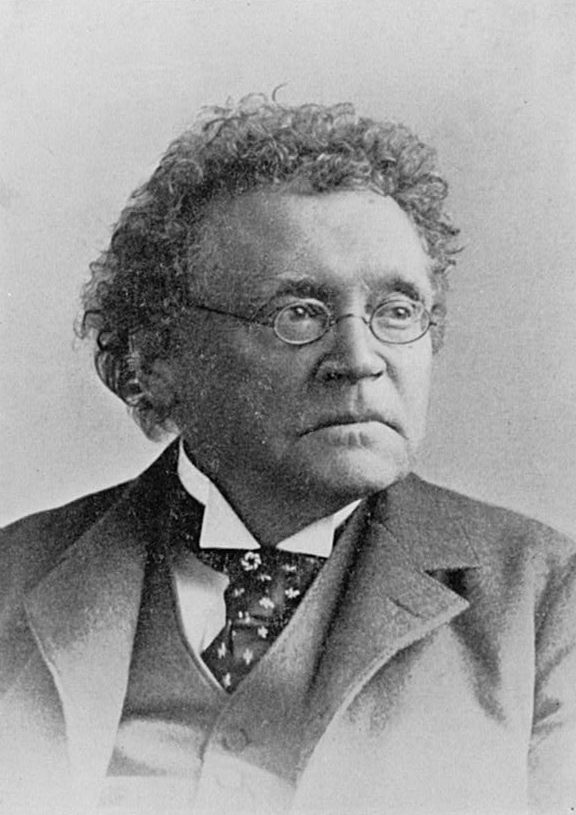
Francis James Child collected the words to over 300 British folk ballads.

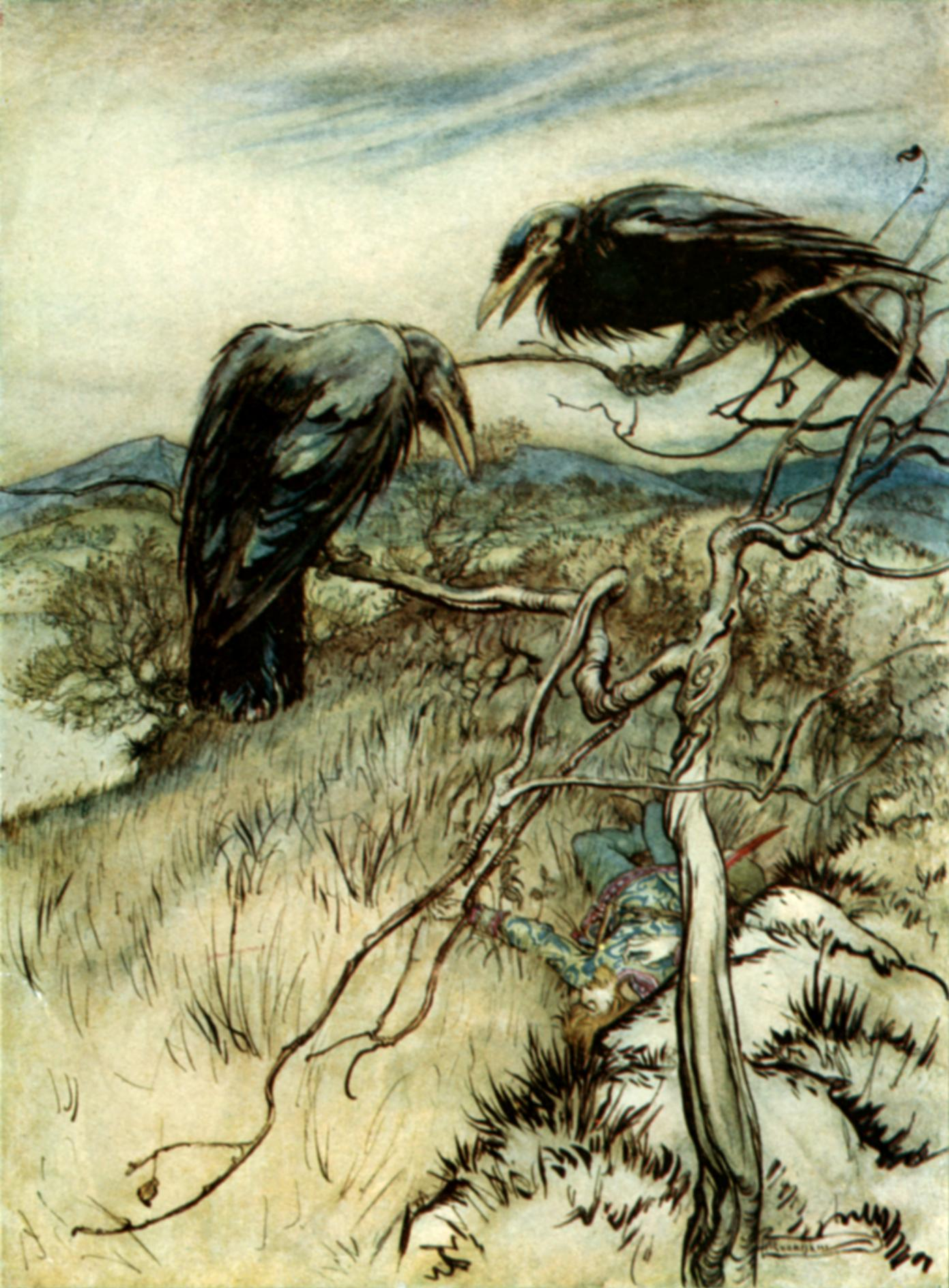
Illustration by Arthur Rackham of Child Ballad 26, "The Twa Corbies"

Child's collection was not the first of its kind; there had been many less scholarly collections of English and Scottish ballads, particularly from Bishop Thomas Percy's Reliques of Ancient English Poetry (1765) onwards. There were also "comprehensive" ballad collections from other countries. Child modelled his work on Svend Grundtvig's Danmarks gamle Folkeviser, classifying and numbering the ballads and noting different versions, which were placed side by side to aid comparison. As a result, one Child number may cover several ballads, which Child considered variants of the same story, although they may differ in many ways (as in "James Hatley"). Conversely, ballads classified separately may contain turns of phrase, and even entire verses, that are identical.

The editorial history of Child's publication received a monograph study by Mary Ellen Brown in 2011.

=== Bibliographic history ===
In 1860, Child published an eight-volume collection entitled English and Scottish Ballads, generally presenting just one variant of each ballad, via Little, Brown and Company. However, as a scholarly edition this was superseded by his later and similarly named The English and Scottish Popular Ballads.

The first edition of Child's book was, once complete, The English and Scottish Popular Ballads, ed. by Francis James Child, 5 vols (Boston and New York: Houghton, Mifflin and Company, [1882–98]).

It was printed in one thousand copies, and issued in ten parts, each with a half-title and title page. The final title pages for each of the five volumes, printed in red and black, were issued with part 10. Part 10 emerged after Child's death, and was edited by George Lyman Kittredge. Volume 5 contained a variety of scholarly apparatuses: the "Glossary" (V, pp. [309]-396); "Sources of the texts of the English and Scottish ballads" (V, pp. [397]-404); "Index of published airs of English and Scottish popular ballads, with an appendix of some airs from manuscript" (V, pp. [405]-424); "Index of ballad titles" (V, pp. [425]-453); "Titles of collections of ballads, or of books containing ballads" (V, pp. [455]-468); and "Index of matters and literature" (V, pp. [469]-502).

The book was reprinted, this time physically in three volumes, in 1957 by the New York-based Folklore Press, in association with the Pageant Book Company. It was reprinted again in 1965 in New York by Dover, this time with an essay by Walter Morris Hart entitled 'Professor Child and the Ballad' (reprinted from Publications of the Modern Language Association of America, vol. 21 [N.S. Vol. 14, no. 4]).

Child's edition was also the basis for a number of shorter, popular editions, prominently including English and Scottish Popular Ballads Edited from the Collection of Francis James Child, ed. by Helen Child Sargent and George Lyman Kittredge (Boston: Houghton-Mifflin, 1904).0

Corrected edition of The English and Scottish Popular Ballads, five volumes (Northfield, Minnesota: Loomis House Press, 2002-2011). Not counting reissues of the 1882-98 publication, this is its second edition. It incorporates, where they apply, the additional lyrics, additional commentary, corrections and music scores that Child included in appendixes in his subsequent volumes. It includes music scores (from sources that Child cited) for many ballads for which the 1882-1898 edition did not include one.

== Subjects of the ballads ==
Child Ballads are generally heavier and darker than is usual for ballads. Some of the topics and other features characteristic enough of Child Ballads to be considered Child Ballad motifs are these: romance, enchantment, devotion, determination, obsession, jealousy, forbidden love, insanity, hallucination, uncertainty of one's sanity, the ease with which the truth can be suppressed temporarily, supernatural experiences, supernatural deeds, half-human creatures, teenagers, family strife, the boldness of outlaws, abuse of authority, betting, lust, death, karma, punishment, sin, morality, vanity, folly, dignity, nobility, honor, loyalty, dishonor, riddles, historical events, omens, fate, trust, shock, deception, disguise, treachery, disappointment, revenge, violence, murder, cruelty, combat, courage, escape, exile, rescue, forgiveness, being tested, human weaknesses, and folk heroes.

On one extreme, some Child Ballads recount identifiable historical people, in known events, embellished for dramatic effect. On the other, some differ from fairy tales solely by their being songs and in verse; some have been recast in prose form as fairy tales. A large part of the collection is about Robin Hood; some are about King Arthur. A few of the ballads are rather bawdy.

== Modern recordings ==
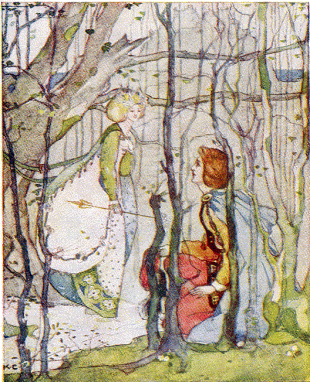
Illustration by Katharine Cameron of a retelling of the story of Child Ballad 37, Thomas Rymer and Queen of Elfland

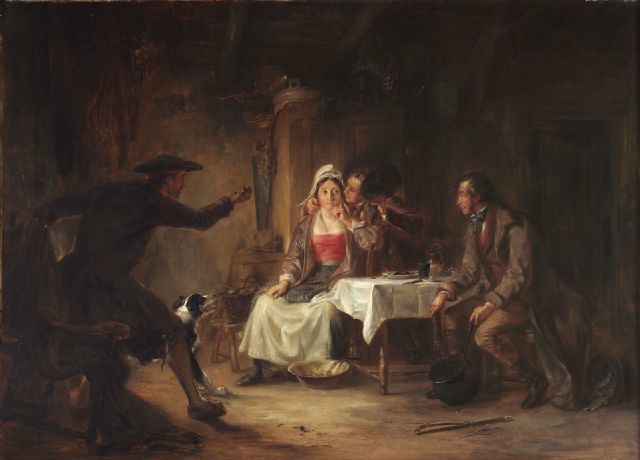
Illustration by Alexander George Fraser of Child Ballad 275, Get Up and Bar the Door

Many Child Ballads have subsequently appeared in contemporary music recordings. Burl Ives's 1949 album, The Return of the Wayfaring Stranger, for example, includes two: "Lord Randall" and "The Divil and the Farmer".

In 1956 four albums (consisting of eight LPs) of 72 Child Ballads sung by Ewan MacColl and A.L. Lloyd were released: The English and Scottish Popular Ballads, Vols. 1–4.

In 1960 John Jacob Niles published The Ballad Book of John Jacob Niles, in which he connects folk songs which he collected throughout the southern United States and Appalachia in the early 20th century to the Child Ballads. Many of the songs he published were revived in the Folk music revival, for example "The Riddle Song" ("I gave my love a Cherry"), which he connects with Child No. 1, "Riddles Wisely Expounded".

Joan Baez sang ten Child ballads distributed among her first five albums, the liner notes of which identified them as such.

Loreena McKennitt performs Child ballad 170 The Death of Queen Jane on her album The Wind that Shakes the Barley recorded in 2010, and Child ballad 239 Annachie Gordon on her album Parallel Dreams in 1989.

British folk rock groups such as Fairport Convention, Pentangle and Steeleye Span drew heavily on the Child Ballads in their repertoires, and many other recording artists have recorded individual ballads. Harry Smith included a number of them into his Anthology of American Folk Music.

A rendition of Child Ballad 155 ("Fatal Flower Garden") appears on Andrew Bird's The Swimming Hour.

In 2003 English folk singer June Tabor recorded the album An Echo of Hooves consisting entirely of Child ballads (210, 212, 161, 195, 191, 106, 74, 215, 88, 20, 58).

Child ballad 95, The Maid Freed from the Gallows has appeared in several recordings of blues and rock bands, notably by Lead Belly as "Gallis Pole" and on the album Led Zeppelin III under the name "Gallows Pole."

Child ballads also occasionally occur in the work of musical groups not usually associated with folk material, such as Ween's recording of "The Unquiet Grave" (Child 78) under the title "Cold Blows the Wind" and versions of "Barbara Allen" (Child 84) recorded by the Everly Brothers, Art Garfunkel, and (on the soundtrack of the 2004 film A Love Song for Bobby Long) John Travolta. In 2009, Fleet Foxes included "The Fause Knight Upon the Road" as the b-side to the 7" release of "Mykonos" (as "False Knight on the Road"). In 2013 US singer-songwriter Anaïs Mitchell and Jefferson Hamer released Child Ballads comprising seven songs from the Francis James Child collection and in 2014 American folksinger Martyn Wylde released eight of the Ballads on his album The Child Ballads, Volume 1.

Child Ballads are also referenced heavily in James A. Michener's novel The Drifters.

Virginia Woolf references Child Ballad number 173 "Mary Hamilton" in A Room of One's Own.

== Print and electronic editions of Child's two collections ==
The two collections have about 200 ballads in common. Each of the two collections includes about a hundred ballads that the other does not.

=== Digitisations of The English and Scottish Popular Ballads (1882–1898) ===
==== Volume 1 ====
- Part 1, ballads 1–28
- Part 2, ballads 29–53

==== Volume 2 ====
- Part 3, ballads 54–82
- Part 4, ballads 83–113; another scan of part 4

==== Volume 3 ====
- Part 5, ballads 114–155
- Part 6, ballads 156–188

==== Volume 4 ====
- Part 7, ballads 189–225
- Part 8, ballads 226–265

==== Volume 5 ====
- Part 9, ballads 266–305; another scan of part 9
- Part 10 (glossary, ballad airs, bibliography, etc)
- "Volume 5" (slightly later 2 volumes in one edition, has "Additions and Corrections" Section containing alternate versions not in earliest Part 10 edition)

All the variants contained in Child's edition are digitised, without apparatus, at http://www.sacred-texts.com/neu/eng/child/ and http://www.peterrobins.co.uk/ballads/.

=== Digitisations of English and Scottish ballads (1860) ===
Volume 1; Volume 2; Volume 3; Volume 4; Volume 5; Volume 6; Volume 7; Volume 8.

== Tunes in print and electronic editions ==
- Child's 1882–1898 publication includes, in its final volume's second half, 55 music scores for 46 (of the 305) ballads.
- Bronson, Bertrand Harris (2009) [1st pub. Princeton University Press, four volumes, 1959–72]. The Traditional Tunes of the Child Ballads: With Their Texts, According to the Extant Records of Great Britain and North America. Northfield, Minnesota: Loomis House Press.
- Bronson, Bertrand Harris. The Singing Tradition of Child's Popular Ballads (Princeton, New Jersey: Princeton University Press, 1976. Northfield, Minnesota: Loomis House Press, 2009 reissue)
- The Traditional Tunes of the Child Ballads: Digital Edition (New York: Camsco Music, 2009) is a CD-R of a scan of Bronson's above-listed four-volume publication.

== See also ==
- List of the Child Ballads
- Border ballad
- List of folk song collections
- Roud Folk Song Index
- List of folk songs by Roud number
- English Folk Dance and Song Society
- Mudcat Café
