= Tradition history =

Methodology of biblical criticism

Tradition history or tradition criticism is a methodology of biblical criticism that situates a text within a stream of a specific tradition in history and attempts to describe the development of the tradition over the course of time. Tradition criticism was developed by Hermann Gunkel. Tradition history seeks to analyze biblical literature in terms of the process by which biblical traditions passed from stage to stage into their final form, especially how they passed from oral tradition to written form. Tradition history/criticism is a sister discipline of form criticism—also associated with Gunkel, who used the results of source and form criticism to develop the history of tradition interpretation. Form criticism and tradition criticism thus overlap, though the former is more narrow in focus. Tradition history is connected with secular folklore studies, especially Axel Olrik's analysis of Scandinavian folklore and the "laws" which he established concerning the nature of such folklore. The stories in the Bible were then analyzed on the basis of these "laws".

== Strengths and weaknesses ==
Tradition history forces interpreters to consider the possibility that some texts may have had an oral prehistory. It also notes that past traditions were retold and used for a present purpose; that it was made real, vital, or relevant for each successive generation.

The method also has weaknesses. Tradition history creates highly speculative reconstructions, often built on the speculative deductions from source criticism. Moreover, tradition history may exaggerate the role of oral tradition. If texts were written soon after they were spoken so that there was not a long oral prehistory, then the assumptions of tradition history fall to the ground. The use of Olrik's laws is also dubious: It may be a tenuous analogy to compare Icelandic folklore with Hebrew folklore since they are very different cultures. Some folklorists question whether Olrik's laws apply even to Scandinavian literature much less any other (Gunkel admitted they did not apply to all stories in Genesis).
