= Evald Tang Kristensen =

Danish folklore collector and author

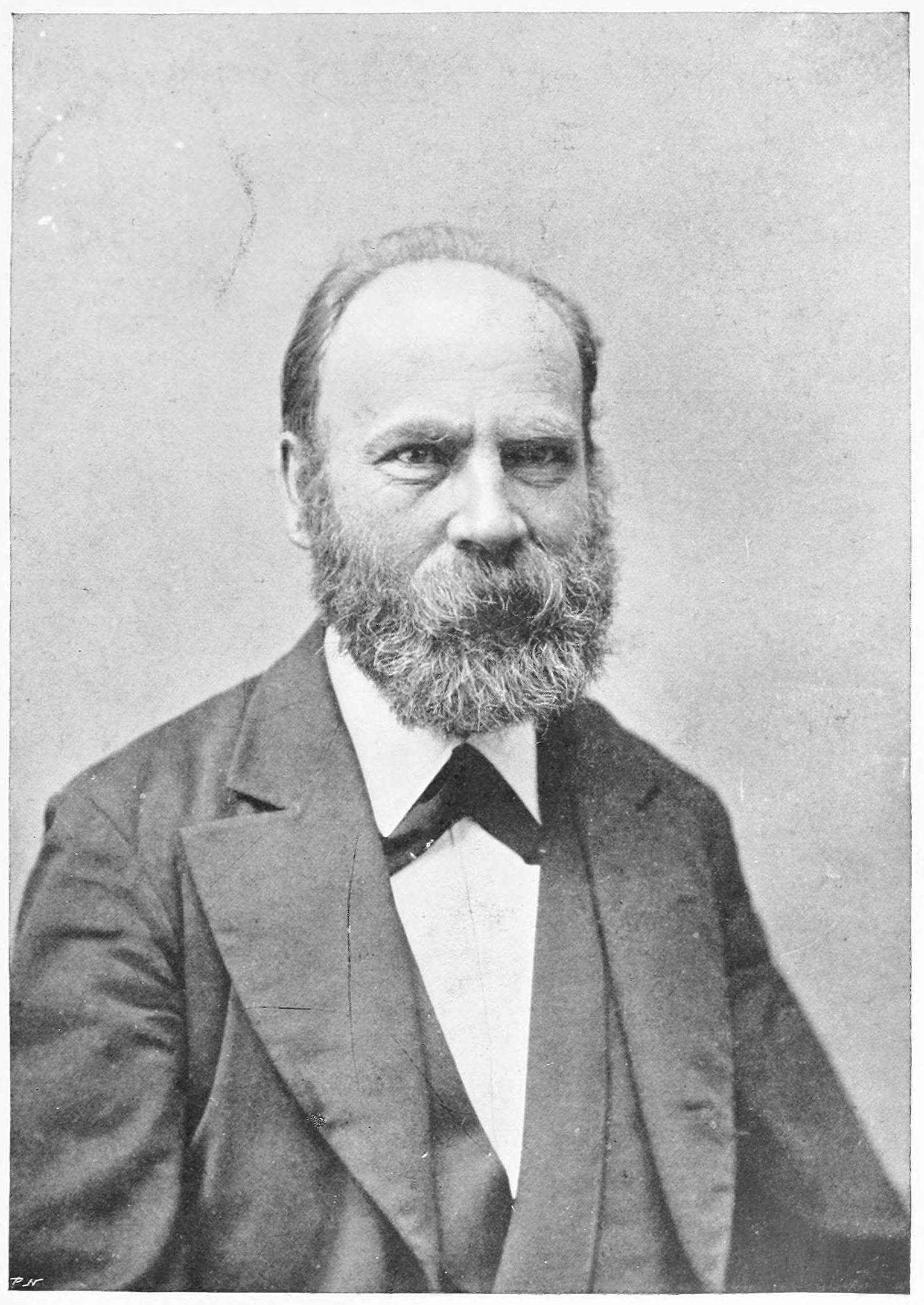
- Born: 24 January 1843; Nørre Bjer, Denmark
- Died: 8 April 1929 (aged 86)
- Occupations: folklore collector and author

Evald Tang Kristensen (24 January 1843 – 8 April 1929) was a Danish folklore collector and author. Working first as a schoolteacher and later solely as a collector, he assembled and published detailed information on all aspects of folklore as he visited country people throughout his native Jutland.

== Early life ==
Born in Nørre Bjert near Kolding, Tang Kristensen had a difficult childhood. After the death of his father when he was still young, he was brought up on the moors near Viborg by an unsympathetic stepfather and a mother who suffered from excessive housework. He was charged with looking after the family's two cows and was expected to care for his younger siblings. Bright for his age, he studied Danish with the local pastor. He wanted to be a doctor, but it was beyond the means available. In 1858, he was sent to the seminary in Grenå, where he graduated as a school teacher in 1861, soon obtaining positions of assistant teacher at Husby near Nissum Fjord, then Helstrup near Randers (1863–66). He prepared to take an additional examination as a cantor to offset his lonely life there. As a result, he became interested in folk music. As a boy he had taken an interest in collecting riddles, but it was only when he was teaching in Gellerup in 1866 that he realized he had a vocation to become a folklore collector.

== Folklore collection ==
The first time he copied down the words of a local song was in 1867 while he was spending Christmas with his mother in Brandstrup. In the area where he was teaching, he soon discovered a wealth of songs and ballads, some dating back to the Middle Ages, which he recorded and, thanks to financial support from fellow collector Svend Grundtvig, published as Jyske Folkeminder I-II (1871–76). He gathered folk tales and legends, published as Jyske Folkeminder III-IV (1876–80), and fairy tales, Jyske Folkeminder V (1881). For the rest of his life, he continued to collect, record and publish all kinds of folklore. His investigations led him to travel throughout Jutland, although he only occasionally worked in eastern Denmark, where he felt less at ease with the inhabitants. While teaching in Fårup near Viborg and Brandstrup (1876–84), he received support for his travels from the State. In 1888, the State granted him a fixed amount of DKK 1,800 a year, allowing him to devote all his time to collecting folklore.

== Later life ==
After Svend Grundtvig died, Tang Kristensen founded the Danish Folklore Society (Folkemindesamfundet) in 1883 and, until 1889, edited its journal Skattegraveren (Treasure Digger), bringing him into contact with those interested in folklore throughout the country. After living for a period in Hadsten (1888–97), he moved to Mølholm near Vejle where he spent the remainder of his life. In 1904, together with Axel Olrik and Henning Frederik Feilberg, Tang Kristensen founded the Danish folklore archives. In 1924, he donated all his published works and manuscripts to that institution while leaving most of his other possessions of folkloric interest to the museums at Herning and Vejle.

== Legacy ==
Some 6,500 individuals communicated material to Tang Kristensen. He recorded some 3,000 songs with 1,000 tunes, 2,700 fairy tales, 2,500 jokes, 25,000 legends, sayings, poems and riddles as well as tens of thousands of descriptions of traditions and everyday life. In addition, he collected samples of handwriting, leaflets and music. The fieldnotes from his travels fill 24,000 pages of manuscript. His records maintain a consistent detailing of time, place and informants. His qualities as a folklore collector were noted by his friend and colleague Hakon Grüner-Nielsen who emphasized his mastery of local dialects, his exceptional memory and his rigorous approach. Tang Kristensen contributed to the method of collecting folklore by going directly to the sources of oral tales, often recording the narrative tone of his informants.

== Own works ==
The published works (in Danish) of Tang Christensen include:

- Sagn fra Jylland. Jyske Folkeminder, 1880
- Æventyr fra Jylland. Jyske Folkeminder, 1881
- Sagn og Overtro fra Jylland. Jyske Folkeminder, 1883
- Gamle viser i Folkemunde, 1891
- Gamle folks fortællinger om det jyske almueliv, som det er blevet ført i mands minde, samt enkelte oplysende sidestykker fra øerne, 1891–94
- Mosekonen brygger. Æventyr og Legender, 1891
- Danske Sagn: Ellefolk, Nisser og adskillige Uhyrer, samt religiøse Sagn, Lys og Varsler, 1893
- Æventyr fra Fyn, 2007
- Danske Sagn: Kjæmper. Kirker. Andre Stedlige Sagn. Skatte, 1895
- Danske Sagn: Personsagn, 1896
- Danske Dyrefabler og Kjæderemser, 1896
- spanske Børnerim, Remser og Lege, 1896
- Danske Sagn: Spøgeri og Gjenfærd, 1897
- Danske Sagn: Djævlekunster, Kloge Mænd og Koner, 1900
- Gamle folks fortællinger om det jyske almueliv, Tillægsbind, 1900–02
- Gamle Kildevæld, 1927
- Minder og Oplevelser, 4 bind, 1923–27

== See also ==
- Danish folklore

== Literature ==
- Bay, Jens Christian (translator): Danish Fairy Tales: A Collection of Popular Stories and Fairy Tales from the Danish of Svend Grundtvig, E. T. Kristensen, Ingvor Bondesen, and L. Budde, New York: Harper and Brothers, 1899, 293 p.
- Holbek, Bengt: Interpretation of fairy tales: Danish folklore in a European perspective, Suomalainen Tiedeakatemia, Helsinki, 1987, 660 p. ISBN 978-951-41-0548-7
- Rockwell, Joan: Evald Tang Kristensen : a lifelong adventure in folklore, Aalborg University Press, Danish Folklore Society, 1982. ISBN 87-7307-043-2.
