= Frederik Christian Lund =

Danish genre and history painter (1826–1901)

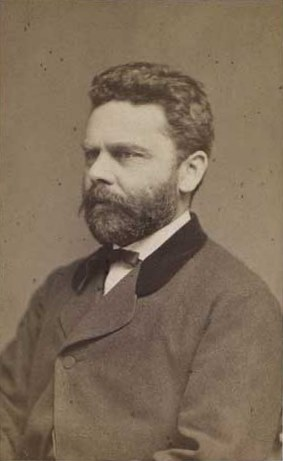
Frederik Christian Lund

Frederik Christian Lund (14 February 1826 – 31 October 1901), commonly known as F. C. Lund, was a Danish genre and history painter. He is also remembered for his illustrations of traditional Danish regional costumes in the mid 19th century.

== Biography ==
Lund attended the Royal Danish Academy of Fine Arts from 1838 to 1845, his course of study being interrupted by his service as a volunteer in the First Schleswig War (1848–1851). While still at the Academy, he helped with decorating the interior of the Thorvaldsen Museum as well as with Jørgen Sonne's frieze on the building's facade. After receiving the Academy's large silver medal in 1852, he sketched or painted battle scenes and other historical subjects which were published in various periodicals. In 1859, he travelled to Paris and between 1862 and 1864 he also visited Brussels, Amsterdam, and London, spending a period with Carl Bloch in Rome where he tried to establish himself as a history painter. He spent a further year in Italy (1874–75) on a study grant. Although he was highly recognized in his day for his decoration of the Viborg Cathedral ceiling in 1876, receiving the Order of the Dannebrog the same year, his work was later torn down to be replaced by Joakim Skovgaard's frescos. Lund is also known for his portraits, landscapes and genre paintings typically depicting the daily life of Italians.

== National costumes ==
While taking part in the First Schlesvig War, Lund began to sketch local country people in their best Sunday attire, especially costumes from the first half of the 19th century. As a result of the success of his work and increased interest in the national heritage in 1864 after Denmark had lost Schesvig and Holstein to the Prussians, the State commissioned him to complete drawings of traditional costumes from the other regions of Denmark. That led to his publication of a collection of 31 coloured lithographs the same year.

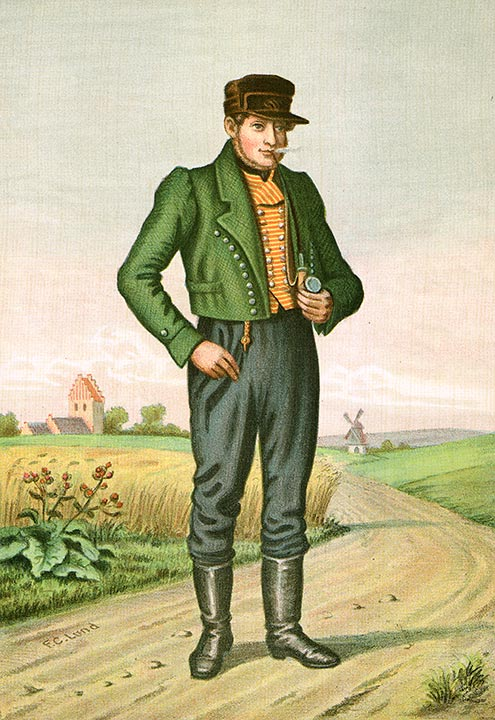
Farmer from Zealand

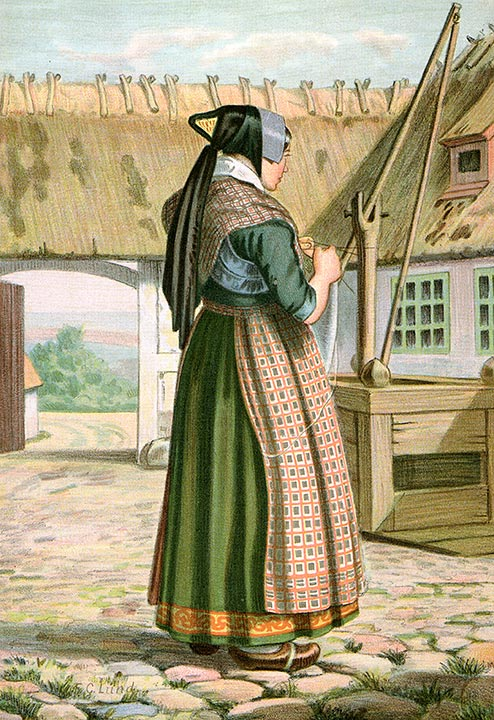
Woman from Havdrup

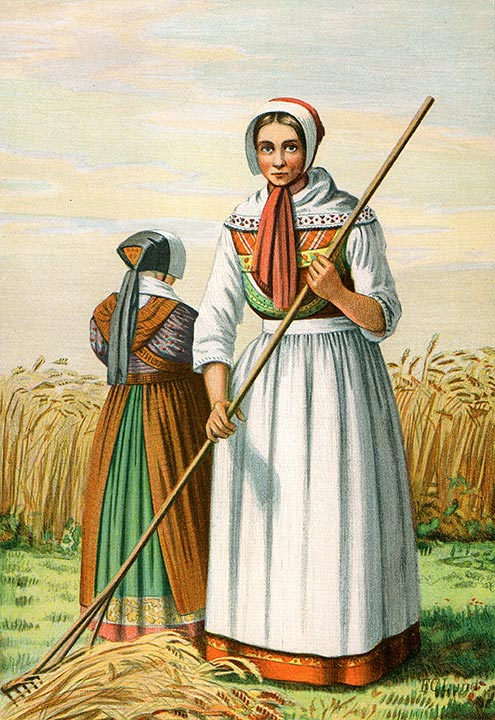
Girl from Hedeby

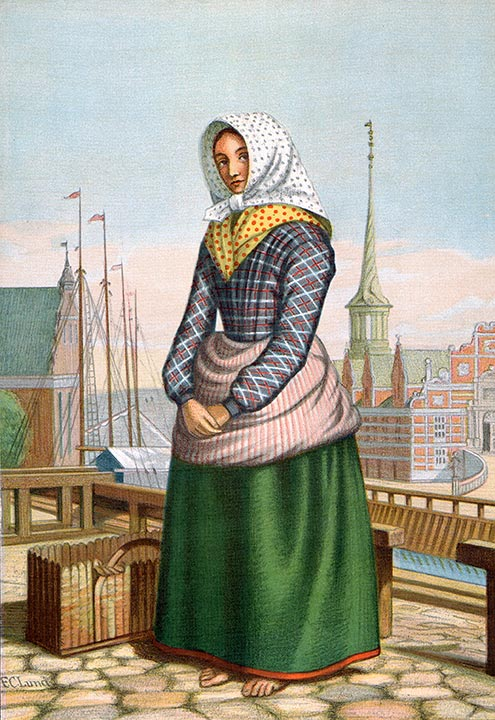
Girl from Skovshoved

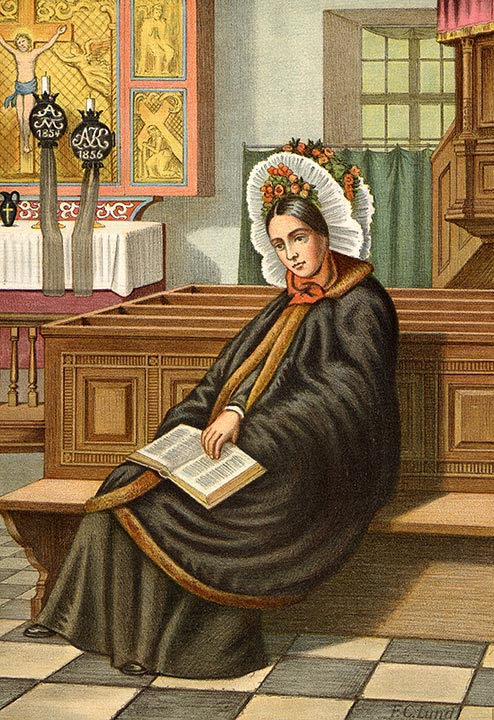
Woman from Bornholm

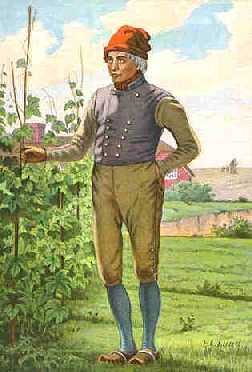
Peasant from Mors

== See also ==
- Danish folklore
