= Danish folklore =

Folklore in Denmark

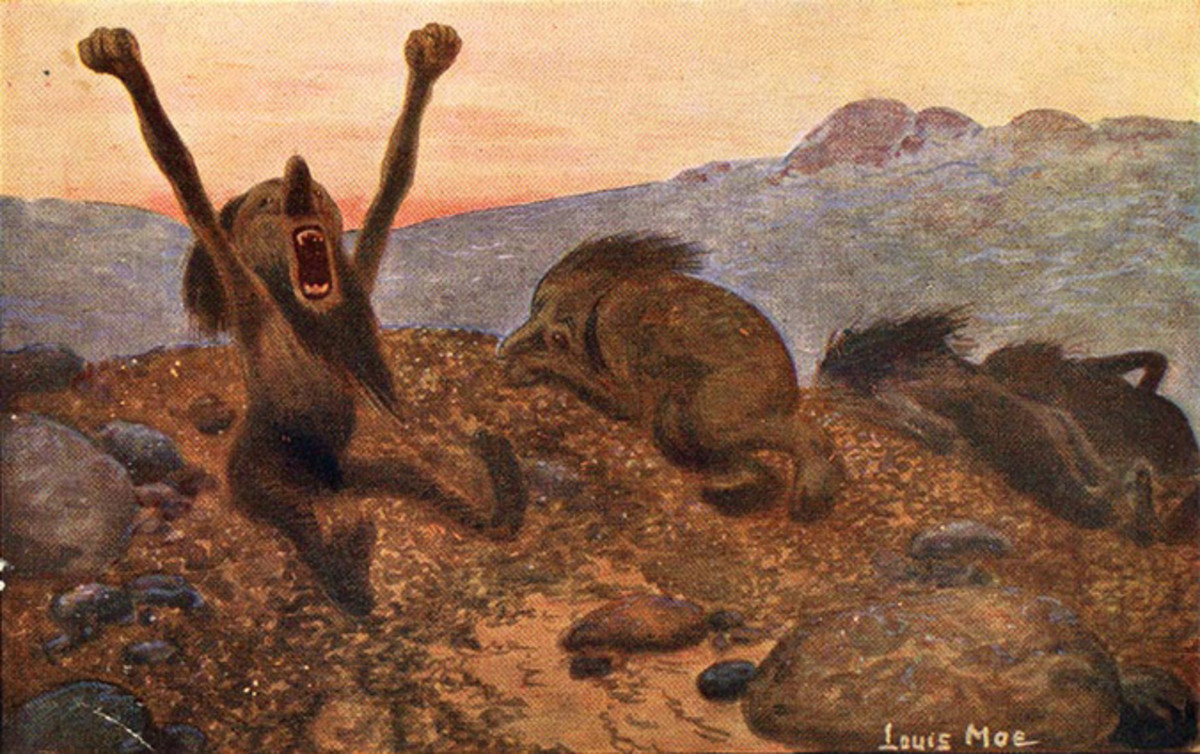
Trolls living in the hills, postcard 1918

Danish folklore consists of folk tales, legends, songs, music, dancing, popular beliefs, myths and traditions communicated by the inhabitants of towns and villages across the country of Denmark, often passed on from generation to generation by word of mouth. As in neighbouring countries, interest in folklore grew with an emerging feeling of national consciousness in 19th century Denmark. Researchers travelled across the country collecting innumerable folktales, songs and sayings while observing traditional dress in the various regions. Folklore today is part of the national heritage, represented in particular by national and local traditions, songs, folk dances and literature.

== History ==
As in the rest of Europe, interest in Danish folklore was a result of national and international trends in the early 19th century. In particular, the German Romanticism movement was based on the belief that there was a relationship between language, religion, traditions, songs and stories and those who practiced them. Common roots encouraged a country's inhabitants to share the concept of a modern nation. The approach spread to smaller, oppressed countries whose politicians and intellectuals worked towards developing the population's awareness of a common ethnicity. This applied to Denmark after the Napoleonic Wars and the loss of Norway in 1814 and above all after the loss of Schleswig to Germany in 1864. A new awareness of common origins was born, encouraging researchers to investigate the everyday lives of countryfolk, at a time when folktales, poetry, songs and beliefs were beginning to disappear. By documenting folk culture, these intellectuals believed they had safeguarded an asset which had been passed on by oral tradition since the Middle Ages or even earlier.

Today it is recognized that only a fraction of the sources can be traced back further than the Renaissance. Furthermore, traditions changed with time while new trends were born. The research and archives compiled in the 19th century by Svend Grundtvig, Henning Frederik Feilberg and Evald Tang Kristensen have nevertheless contributed to a better appreciation and understanding of Danish folklore.

== Music and folk dancing ==
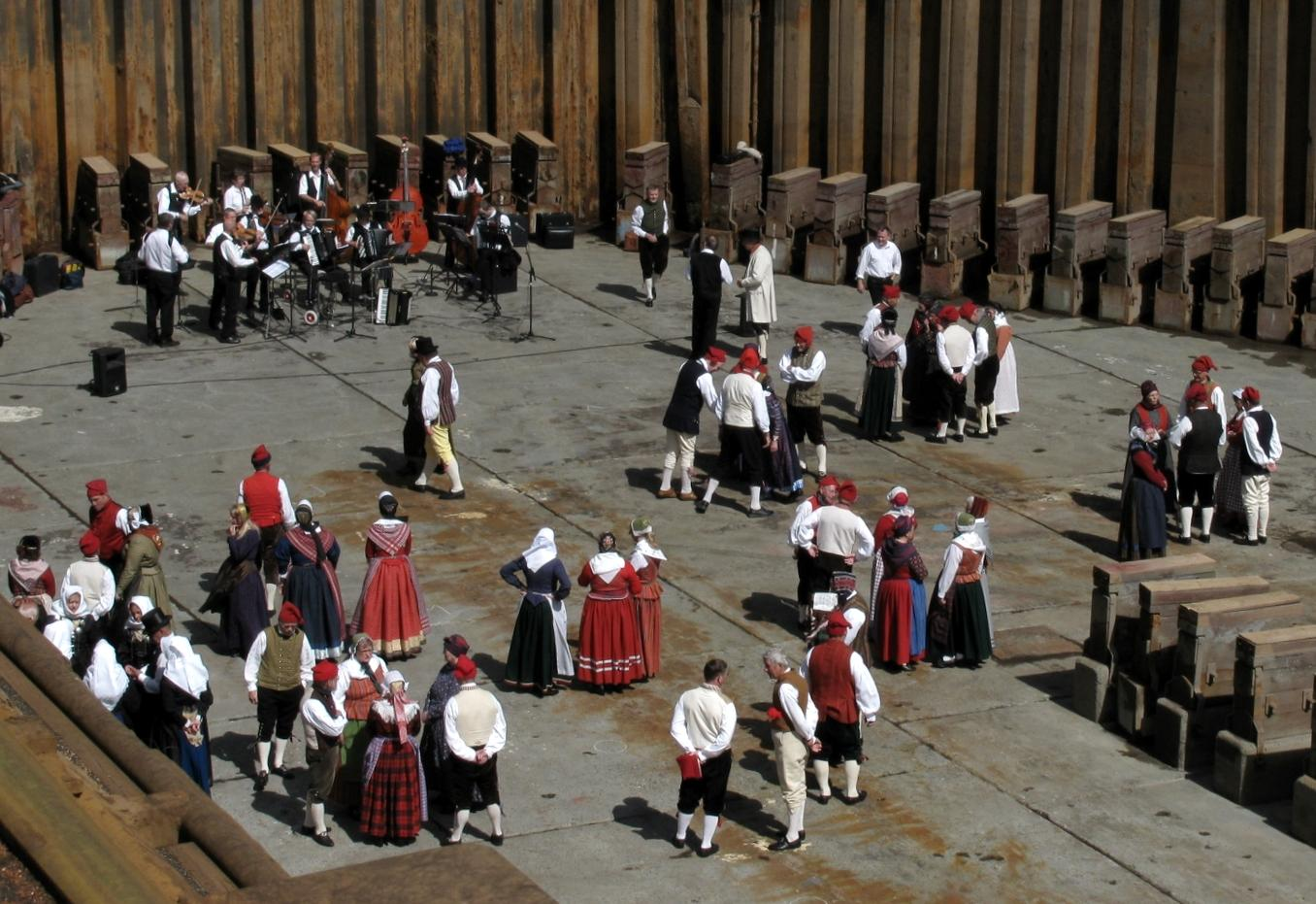
Folk dancing in Frederikshavn, June 2009

Over the centuries, dancing has formed a key part of celebrations in Denmark. Festive gatherings often took place in farmhouses where chain dances or rotational sequences provided opportunities for everyone to join in even if the room was packed. In the 17th and 18th centuries, music in Denmark could only be performed in most areas by officially appointed town musicians (stadsmusikanter) who played together with their apprentices at family gatherings, local festivities and even in churches. There were however a few exceptions including Bornholm, Amager and Fanø which maintained their own traditions. As the town musicians disliked traditional instruments such as drums, bagpipes and hurdy-gurdies, the fiddle was increasingly used for dance music.

By the second half of the 17th century, pair dances from Poland were introduced, especially the pols, a variant of the polska, soon to be followed by the minuet. Dances which became popular in the 19th century included the waltz and Danish variants of contra and square dances such as the hopsa, rheinlænder, galop, sveitrit and schottish.

Those taking part in the festivities wore their best Sunday costumes, which differed somewhat from region to region but were invariably made at home from flax, wool or linen. In the middle of the 19th century, both the traditional costumes and the dances began to die out. But by the beginning of the 20th century, when there was renewed interest in the national heritage, a number of groups began to revive the music, the dances and the costumes. In 1901, the Society for the Promotion of Danish Folk Dancing (Foreningen til Folkedansens Fremme) was founded in Copenhagen, leading to local dancing societies throughout the country. Today there are some over 12,000 folk dancers belonging to 219 local clubs which provide courses in music, dancing and dressmaking.

== National costumes ==
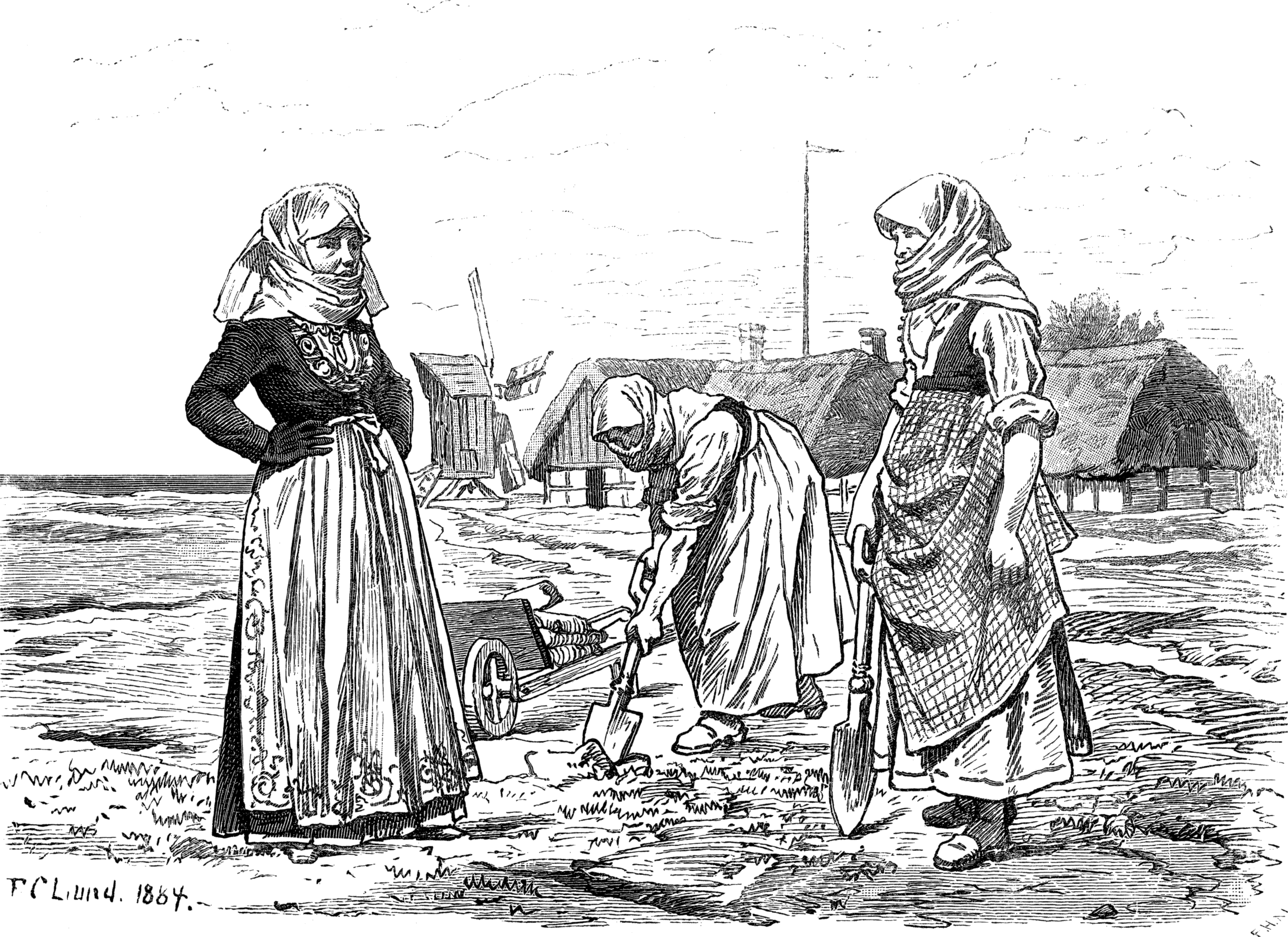
Frederik Christian Lund: Women from Læsø (1884)

The traditional costumes of Denmark, though varying from region to region, date back roughly to the period between 1750 and 1900 when clothes were often home-made from yarn spun from wool or flax. In rural communities, the fabrication of garments for both family members and servants was an important part of everyday life. They were usually made of woolen fabric, woven by the women themselves or by a professional weaver. Many of the patterns, based on a limited range of colours from vegetable dyes, were common to almost all parts of the country. Variations in costume between the regions can best be seen in women's best Sunday attire, especially in the arrangement of the ever present headdress, either in the form of a bonnet or a scarf. The headpiece often consisted of a bonnet, a piece of linen underneath and a scarf to hold it in place, either in broad lace or in embroidered tulle. On the island of Zealand, there was a tradition for trailing bonnets embroidered with gold and silver thread.

Skirts or petticoats were long, worn by the layer and invariably covered by an apron of fine silk or embroidered mull. The upper part of the body was covered by a fabric jacket or blouse, A close-fitting bodice fastened by hooks or laced at the front was worn in some regions. Skirts, jackets and bodices were edged and decorated with flat or patterned silk tape while light scarves were worn around the neck to cover the shoulders and throat. Like the women, men's clothing was made mainly of flax and wool but their knee-breeches were often of leather. Long home-knitted white wollen stockings reached above the knee. In addition to long shirts, men wore several jerseys and jackets. The well-off displayed buttons made of silver although usually they were of tin or even horn. Men and women both generally wore clogs while men often had long, leather top-boots and both men and women wore leather dress shoes with a buckle in front.

The artist Frederik Christian Lund, who had travelled across Denmark as a soldier in the First Schleswig War, took an interest in sketching people in local costumes in various parts of the country. He completed his collection of 31 coloured sketches in 1864, publishing them as coloured lithographs in Danske Nationaldragter (Danish National Costumes).

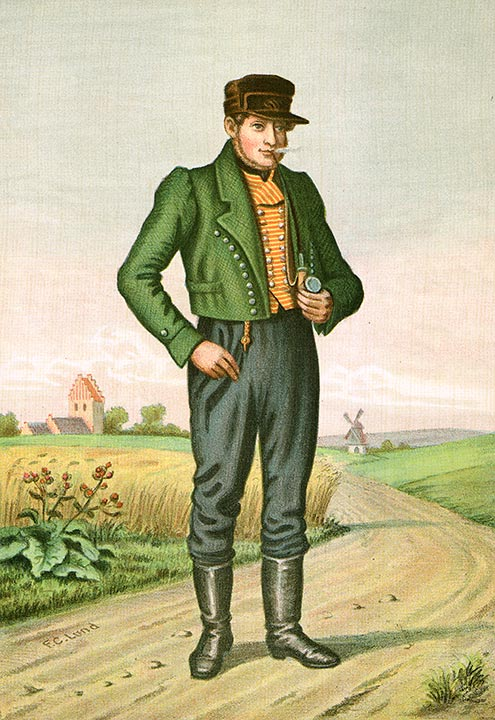
Farmer from Zealand

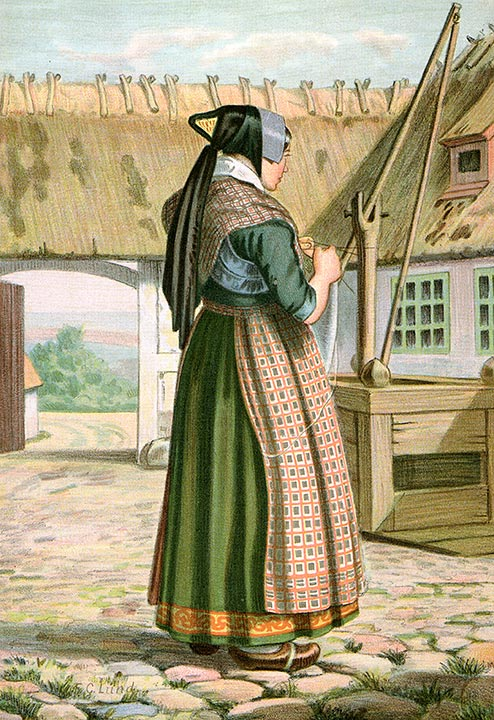
Woman from Haudrup

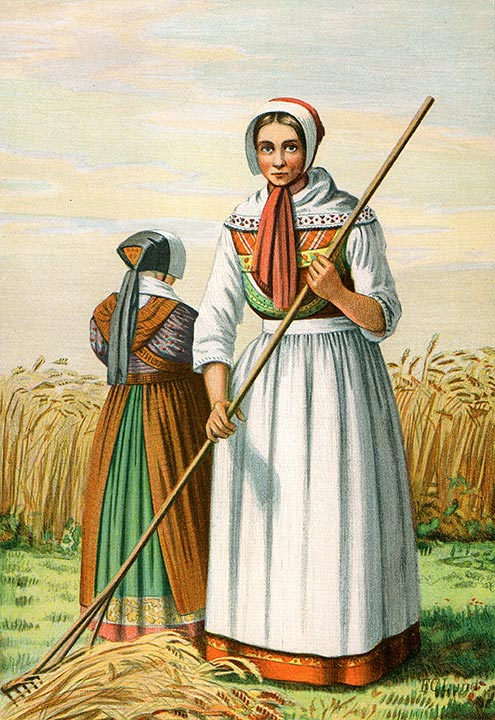
Girl from Hedebo

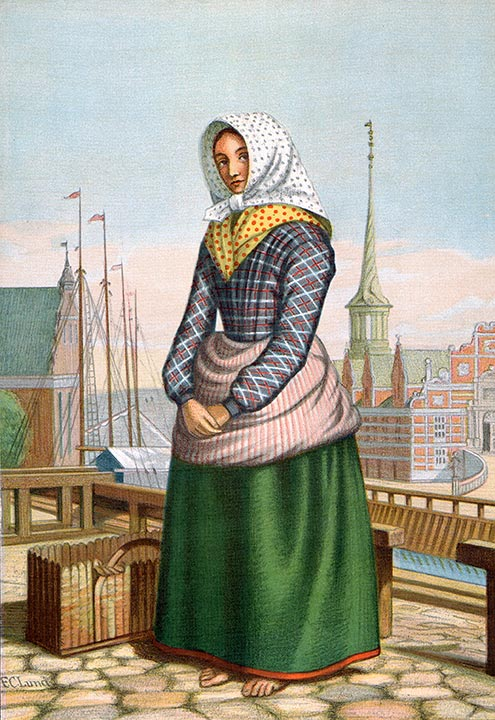
Girl from Skovshoved

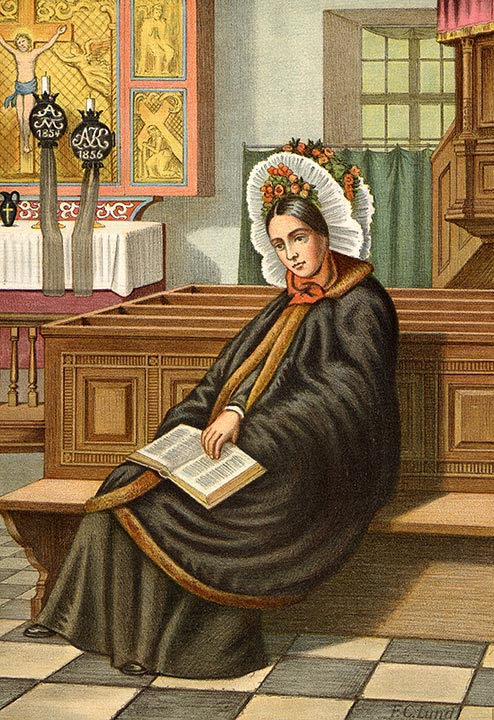
Woman from Bornholm

== Folk tales and legendary figures ==
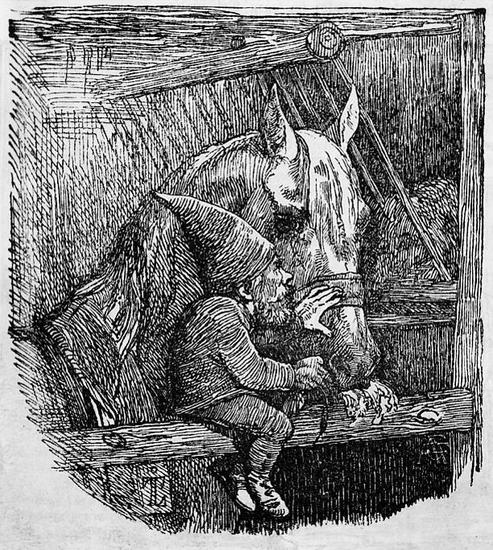
Johan Thomas Lundbye: Nisse (1842)

In 1817, the art historian and writer Just Mathias Thiele began to undertake cataloguing work on a voluntary basis at the Royal Library in Copenhagen where he compiled a short work titled Prøver af danske Folkesagn (Samples of Danish Folktales). This was to lead to far more significant research, inspired partly by the fairy tale collections of the Brothers Grimm and partly by Denmark's growing interest in Romanticism. He travelled around the country, recording and writing up legends, attracting the support of influential figures such as the literary historian Rasmus Nyerup, who wrote a foreword emphasizing the multifaceted significance of the enterprise. His four-volume collection of Danish Folktales (Danske Folkesagn) was published between 1819 and 1823. The manner in which he presented the stories, recording the narratives given by the local people he met, served as an example and working method for subsequent work by Svend Grundtvig, Evald Tang Kristensen, Axel Olrik and Hans Ellekilde who further documented legends and folk tales across Denmark. As Nyreup had foreseen, the work had an added dimension: "Providing material for poets and themes for further development." His collection did indeed have a profound influence on the Danish Golden Age, providing inspiration for Hans Christian Andersen's fairytales, Steen Steensen Blicher's short stories, Johan Ludvig Heiberg's plays and Christian Winther's poetry. Indeed, it laid the foundations for Denmark's Modern Breakthrough and the regional literature movement that dominated elite literary circles later in the 19th century.

Numerous Danish folktales contain mythical figures such as trolls, elves, goblins, and wights as well as figures from Norse mythology. The nisse is a particularly well-known legendary figure in Danish folklore, apparently dating back to pre-Christian times when it was believed there were household gods. Other Scandinavian countries also have similar figures and there are similarities to the English brownies and hobs. Just Mathias Thiele collected legends about the nisse in his Danske Folkesagn (Danish Folktales) (1819–1823), which encouraged artists such as Johan Thomas Lundbye to depict the julenisse (Christmas nisse) later in the 19th century. Dressed in grey with a pointed red cap, he was no taller than a 10-year-old boy. Traditionally each farm had its own nisse living on the loft or in a stable. The creatures would be helpful if treated properly, for instance by giving them a bowl of porridge with a clump of butter at night, but, failing such treatment, they could also be troublesome.

== Literature ==
Studies

- Lunding, Astrid. "The System of Tales in the Folklore Collection of Copenhagen". In: Folklore Fellows Communications (FFC) nº 2. 1910.
- Koudal, Jens Henrik. 1997. The impact of the "Stadsmusikant" on Folk music in Doris Stockmann & Jens Henrik Koudal (eds). 1997. Historical studies on folk and traditional music: ICTM Study Group on Historical Sources of Folk Music, conference report, Copenhagen, 24–28 April 1995. Museum Tusculanum Press.

Collections

- Winther, Matthias. Danske Folkeeventyr, samlede. (Gesammelte dänische Volksmärchen). Kjobehavn: 1823.
- Bay, Jens Christian, tr. Danish Fairy Tales: A Collection of Popular Stories and Fairy Tales from the Danish of Svend Grundtvig, E. T. Kristensen, Ingvor Bondesen, and L. Budde. New York: Harper and Brothers, 1899.
- Grundtvig, Sven, coll. Danish Fairy Tales. Tr. Jesse Grant Cramer. Boston: The Four Seas Company, 1912.
- Holbek, Bengt (1990). Dänische Volksmärchen [Danish Folktales]. Berlin, Boston: De Gruyter. doi:10.1515/9783112707630.
- Tangherlini, Timothy R. 2013. Danish Folktales, Legends, and Other Stories. Seattle: University of Washington Press. Copenhagen: Museum Tusculanum Press.
