= Just Mathias Thiele =

Danish scholar and librarian

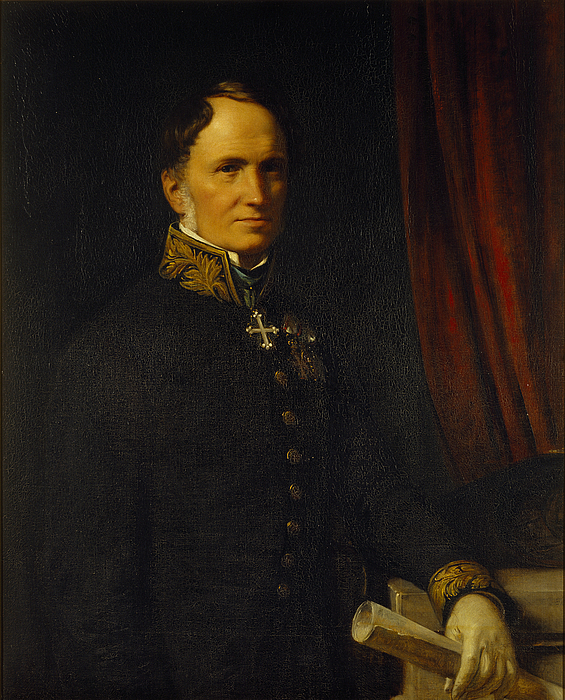
- Just Mathias Thiele, portrait by Wilhelm Marstrand. Thorvaldsens Museum
- Born: 13 December 1795; Copenhagen, Denmark
- Died: 9 November 1874 (aged 78); Copenhagen, Denmark
- Occupations: Writer; librarian
- Known for: Collecting Danish folk tales Bertel Thorvaldsen biography Royal Danish Print Collection

Just Mathias Thiele (13 December 1795 – 9 November 1874) was a Danish scholar and librarian. A central personage during the Danish Golden Age, he contributed to Danish cultural life in a number of capacities. He collected and published Danish folk tales with inspiration from the Brothers Grimm and founded the Royal Print Collection, today part of the Danish National Gallery. After the death of Bertel Thorvaldsen, he saved his archives and other papers and based on them he wrote his first biography.

He was the father of Thorvald Nicolai Thiele.

== Early life and literary production ==
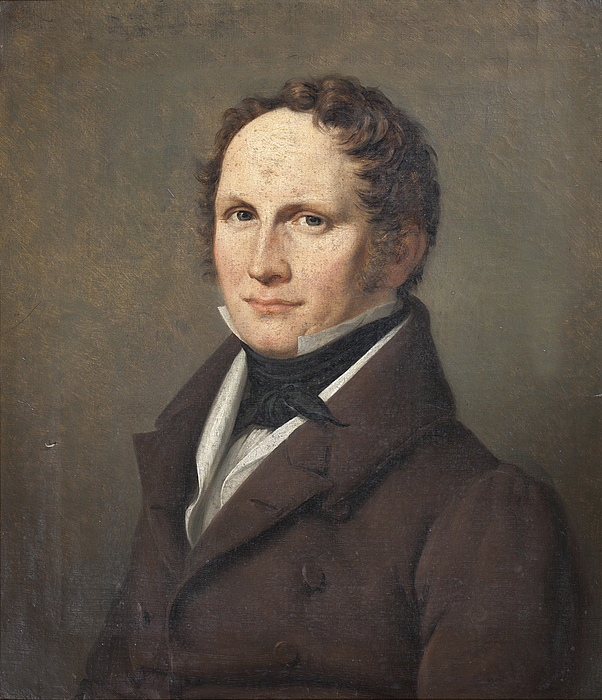
Just Mathias Thiele painted by J. L. Lund, 1831, Bakkehusmuseet

Just Mathias Thiele was born on 13 December 1795 in Copenhagen. After receiving his schooling at the Metropolitan School and studying privately with A.G. Rudelbach, he had his debut in 1816 in Danfana, a magazine, before publishing his first book, a novel named Bjergmandsdalen, the following year.

From 1817 to 1835 he was employed at the Royal Danish Library. During this phase, with inspiration from the Brothers Grimm, he collected Danish folk tales, relying on both written sources and oral ones which he collected on travels around the country. He published them in four volumes as Danske Folkesagn I–IV between 1818 and 1823 (extended edition 1843). He also wrote poetry and drama but to no great acclaim and his works within that field are forgotten today.

== Relationship to Bertel Thorvaldsen ==
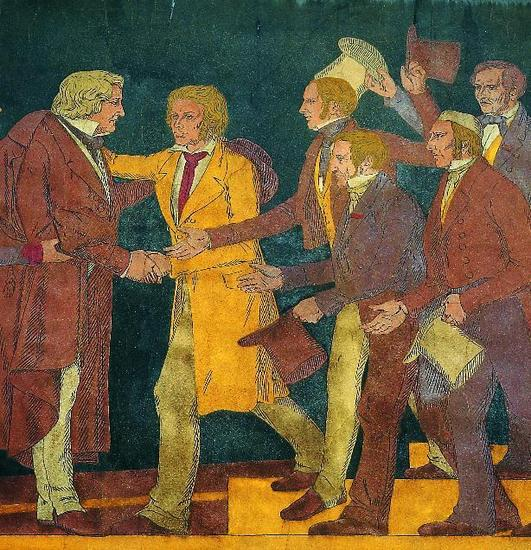
Jørgen Sonne's frieze on the facade of Thorvaldsens Museum: The reception of Thorvaldsen in Copenhagen, Thiele is the third man from the left, standing behind Jonas Collin

Thiele's publication of Danish folk tales was rewarded with a scholarship. He traveled to Rome where he became a close friend of Bertel Thorvaldsen who would also become a major focus for his academic writings with Den danske Billedhugger Bertel Thorvaldsen og hans Værker, I–IV ("The Danish Sculptor Bertel Thorvaldsen and his oeuvre, I–IV") published from 1831 to 1850 and Thorvaldsens Biographie, 1-4 from 1851 to 1856.

Thiele was also a member of the committee for the foundation of Thorvaldsens Museum. After Thorvaldsen's death, he was effective in saving his archives and other papers from destruction.

== Art administration ==
Thiele was secretary at the Royal Danish Academy of Fine Arts from 1825 to 1871. While working at the Royal Library, he was the main force behind saving its neglected collection of 70,000 prints which became the basis for establishing the Royal Print Collection, today part of the holdings of the Danish National Gallery. He served as inspector at the collection from 1835 and its director from 1861.

== Family and friends ==
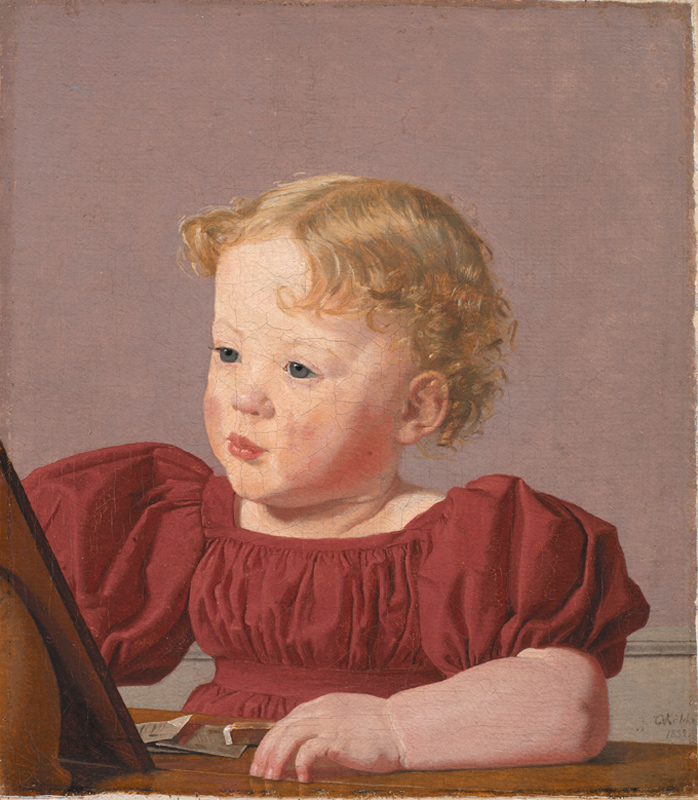
Ida Thiele, at the age of 2, painted by Christen Købke (1832)

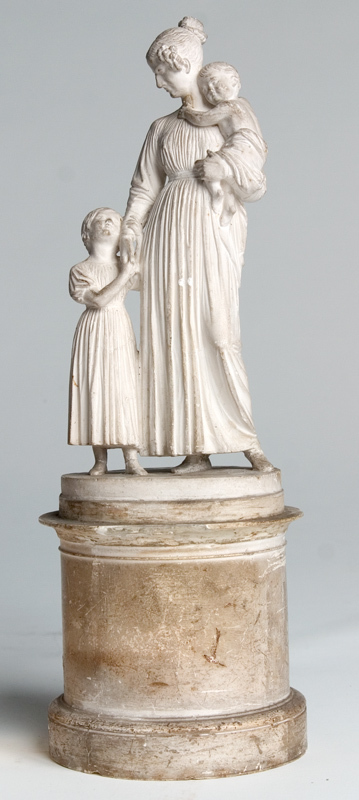
H. W. Bissen: Sophie Thiele, née Holten with the daughters Ida and Hanne, 1858

Thiele was married to Sophie Holten, and after her death to Hanne Aagesen in 1838. His children included:

- Thorvald N. Thiele (1838–1910) who became a prominent astronomer, actuary and mathematician, internationally recognized as one of the Founders of statistics.
- Ida Wilde née Thiele (1830–1862) who is commemorated in Hans Christian Andersen's tale Little Ida's Flowers.

Just Mathias Thiele was throughout his life an active part of the cultural environment in Copenhagen. Still a student, he became part of the circle of artists and intellectuals around Knud Lyne and Kamma Rahbek at Bakkehuset, a time he commemorated in Erindringer fra Bakkehuset ("Memoirs from Bakkehuset") published in 1869. He was also part of the salon life at Sophienholm which revolved around Friederike Brun.

== Works ==
- Danske Folkesagn, I-IV. Copenhagen. 1818–23.
- Den danske Billedhugger Bertel Thorvaldsen og hans Værker, I-IV, Copenhagen. 1831–1850.
- Danmarks Folkesagn, I-II. Copenhagen. 1843. (Optrykt 1968).
- Den danske Almues overtroiske Meninger. (= Danmarks Folkesagn III). Copenhagen. 1860. (Optrykt 1968).
- Thorvaldsens Biographie, I-IV. Copenhagen. 1851–1856.
- Erindringer fra Bakkehuset, Copenhagen. 1869.
- Af mit Livs Aarbøger, I-II. 1873 (new collected edition with Erindringer fra Bakkehuset, with notes by Carl Dumreicher, 1917).

== Bibliography ==
- Nørregård-Nielsen, Hans Edvard: Den lille Idas ansigter, 1987

== See also ==
- Danish National Gallery
- Danish folklore
