= Epic Laws of Folk Narrative =

Principles for understanding folktales

The epic laws of folk narrative was a series of principles identified by Axel Olrik for understanding the structure and form of folktales, and have a foundational significance in European folklore studies.

Olrik's formulation of his 'epic laws' was inspired by an idea of Moltke Moe, but whereas Moe sought to derive rules for the historical development of narratives, Olrik's approach focuses on the structure of oral narrative. The principles were articulated in various publications, the first prominent one appearing in Danish in 1908. In the same year, Olrik presented the principles in German at an interdisciplinary congress in Berlin.

Olrik's thought on 'epic laws' was part of a wider project, developed with Kristian Erslev, for understanding oral narrative (which Olrik called sagn in Danish), also including principles for the study of sources and a theory of transmission. Although Olrik drew on non-European material, his focus was explicitly on European folk narrative.

== Summary of the laws ==
This summary is based on the numbering of the 1908 Danish article, and the English terminology is as far as possible from the 1965 English translation of the 1909 German article.

#	Key Danish term	Usual English term	
1	overskuelighed	simplicity	The story has few characters or other agents.
2	sceniske totalslov	the law of two to a scene	Only two characters act at a time.
3	sagnet skematiserer sit stof	schematic storytelling	Dialogue is, for example, repeated verbatim as far as possible.
4	sagnets plastik	the use of tableaux scenes	Images are clear; outer behaviour is consistent with inner motivation.
5	sagnets logik	logic	The story generally incorporates only elements necessary for the action: plausibility is determined more by the internal logic of the plot than by external reality.
6	enkelt begivenhed	unity of plot	The action coalesces around a single event; only that which is necessary to it is included in the story.
7	episke handlingsenhed	epic unity	Each development of the story builds clearly towards an event which the listener can foresee right from the beginning.
8	handlingens ligeløb	the law of the single strand	Events occur sequentially and in order of causation. Synchronous events are avoided.
9	midtpunktsloven	concentration on a leading character	The story is organised around a single central character.
10	to hovedpersoner	two main characters	The central character can manifest as a duo (often a man and a woman, often with the woman subservient to the man).
11	modsætningsloven	the law of opposition	When two characters are on stage, they are often opposite in character and are in opposition in the story: bad/good, poor/rich. big/small, stupid/wise, young/old.
12	modsat karakter	the law of contrast	Secondary characters have characteristics which contrast with the main character.
13	tvillingeloven	the law of twins	When two people perform an action jointly, they prove weaker than the character who performs the action alone.
14	tretalsloven og gentagelsesloven	the law of 3 and the law of repetition	There is frequent repetition, usually in threes.
15	bagvægt	the law of final position	When several similar situations are presented in sequence, the main emphasis is on the final one.
16	reglen om forvægt	the law of initial position	The first person listed in a sequence is of the highest status, but we will sympathise most with the person listed last.
17	indledningsloven	the law of opening	The story moves from the mundane to the exciting.
18	hvileloven	the law of closing	The story does not end abruptly with the climax, but always with some epilogue or closing formula.

== Key publications ==
- 'Episke love i folkedigtningen', Danske Studier, 5 (1908): 69–89.
- ‘Epische Gesetze der Volksdichtung’, Zeitschrift für deutsches Altertum und Deutsche Literatur, 51 (1909), 1–12, translated into English by Jeanne P. Steager as ‘Epic Laws of Folk Narrative’, in The Study of Folklore, ed. by Alan Dundes (Englewood Cliffs, N.J.: Prentice-Hall, 1965), pp. 129–41, OCLC 523555.
- Nogle grundsætninger for sagnforskning. Efter forfatterens død udgivet af Dansk folkemindesamling, ed. by Hans Ellekilde (Copenhagen: Det Schønbergske forlag, 1921), translated into English as Principles for Oral Narrative Research, trans. by Kirsten Wolf and Jody Jensen (Bloomington: Indiana University Press, 1992), ISBN 0253341752.
