= Thorvaldsen Museum =

Museum in Copenhagen

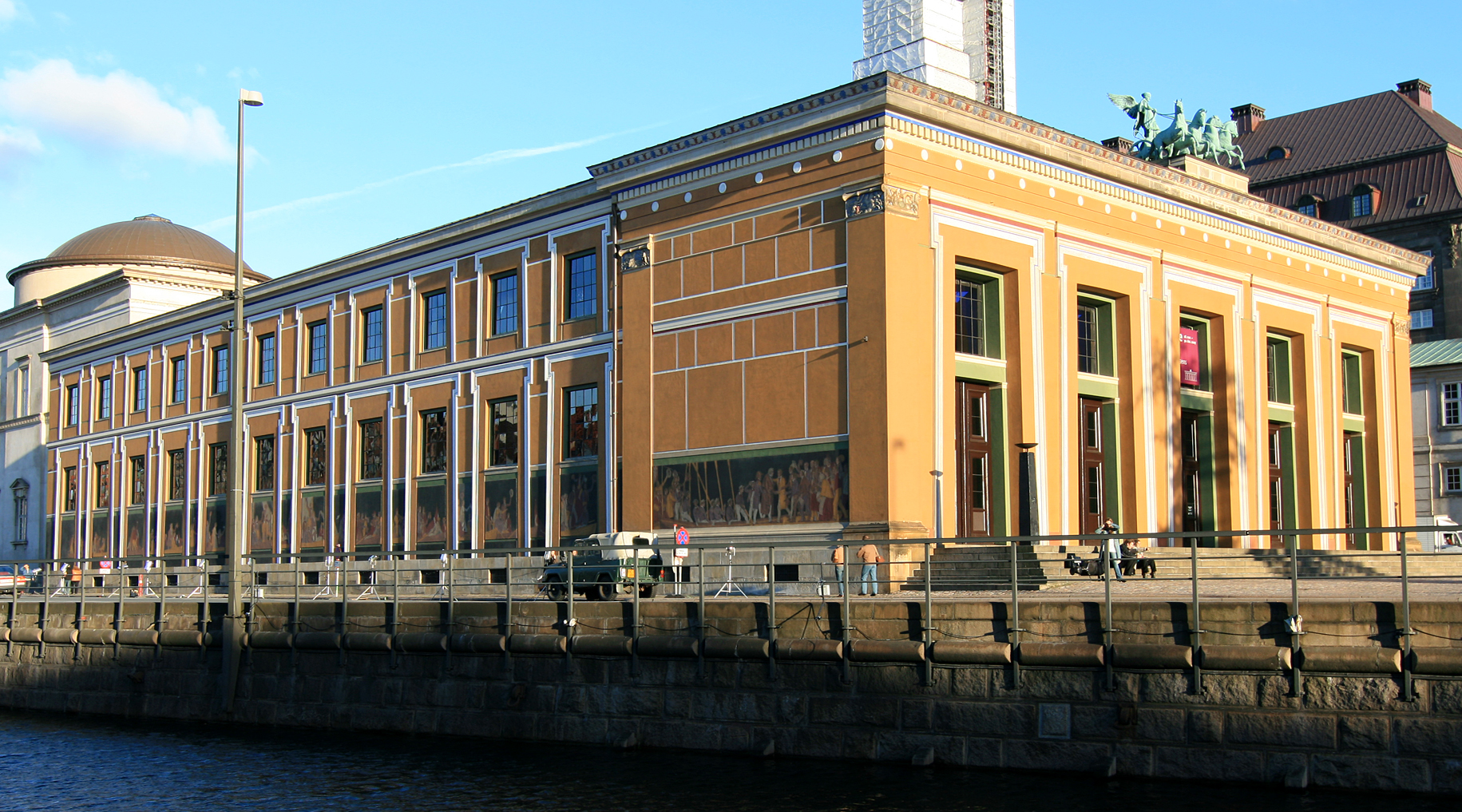
- Museum as seen from the canal
- Interactive fullscreen map
- Location: Copenhagen, Denmark
- Coordinates: 55°40′36″N 12°34′42″E

The Thorvaldsen Museum is a single-artist museum in Copenhagen, Denmark, dedicated to the art of Danish and Icelandic Neoclassical sculptor Bertel Thorvaldsen (1770–1844), who lived and worked in Rome for most of his life (1796–1838). The museum is located on the small island of Slotsholmen in central Copenhagen next to Christiansborg Palace. Designed by Michael Gottlieb Bindesbøll, the building was constructed from 1838 to 1848 following a public collection of funds in 1837.

== History ==
The idea of a Bertel Thorvaldsen Museum in Copenhagen emerged in the mid-1830s. A committee was in December 1836 set up at the initiative of Hans Puggaard. Its members included Joakim Frederik Schouw, Henrik Nicolai Clausen, Niels Laurits Høyen, Hermann Ernst Freund, Jonas Collin and Just Mathias Thiele. On 10 January 1837, it launched a nation-wide fund raising campaign. The following 15 men were elected as board members on a General Assembly held on 21 June 1837: H.N. Clausen (190 votes), Just Mathias Thiele (189 votes), Jonas Collin (185 votes), N.L. Høyen (183 votes), Hermann Ernst Freund (179 votes), J.F. Schouw (165 votes), Gustav Friedrich Hetsch (138 votes), Herman Wilhelm Bissen (112 votes), Søren Ludvig Tuxen (86 votes), Peder Brønnum Scavenius (83 votes), Heinrich Gamst (82 votes), Hans Puggaard (76 votes), Friederich Ernst von Prangen (76 votes), Christian Jürgensen Thomsen (67 votes) and Jørgen Hansen Koch (66 votes). In addition, Joseph Hambro, Carl Moltke (60 votes), J.H. Lund or J.L. Lund (46 votes), Hans Christian Ørsted (44 votes), Heinrich Reventlow-Criminil (39 votes) were elected as alternates.

== Architecture ==
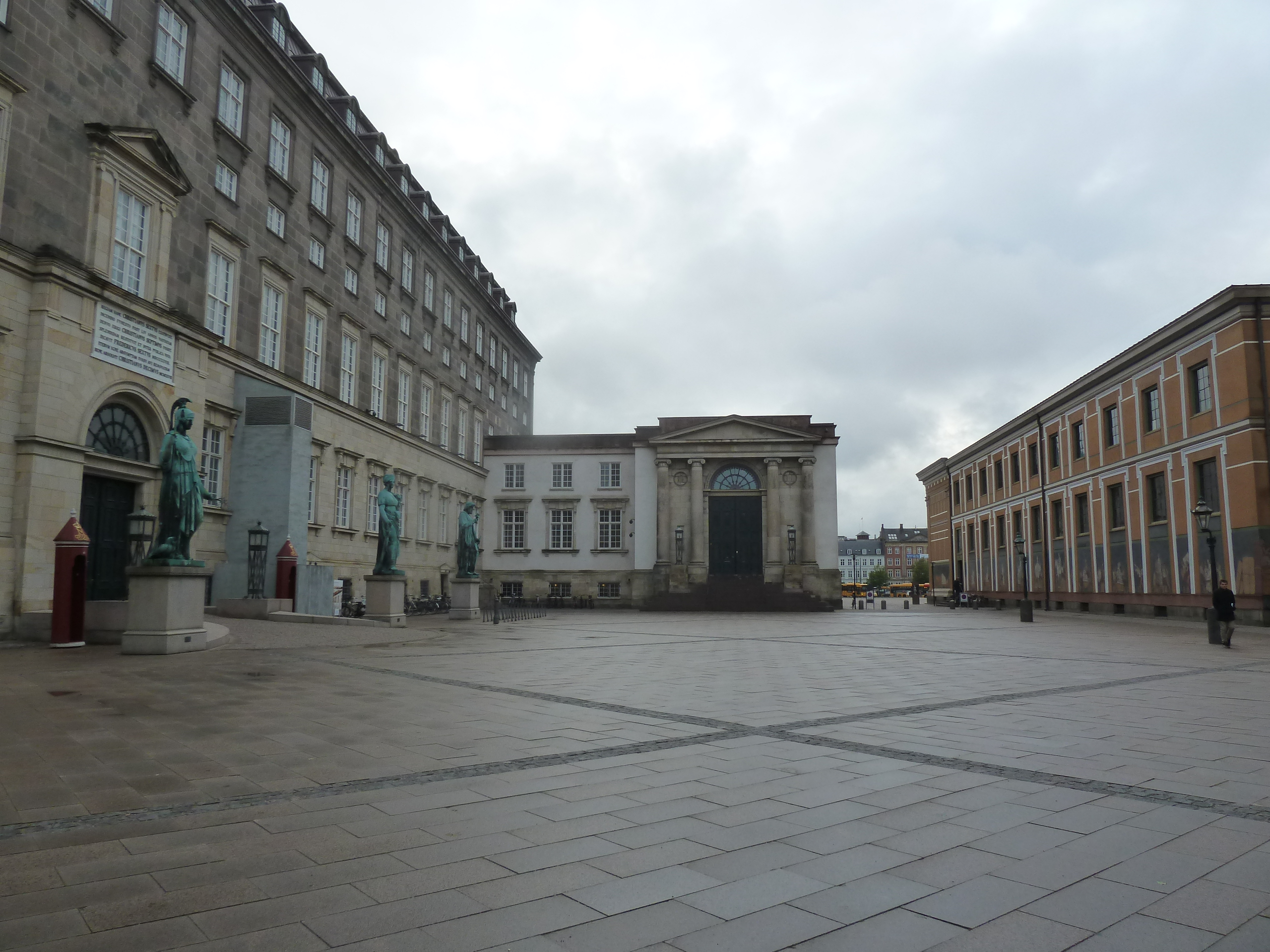
Thorvaldsen Museum with Christiansborg Palace

The building is strongly inspired by antique Greek architecture and built around an inner courtyard where the artist is buried. The courtyard is notable for being painted in Egyptian motifs: tall date palms; lions and crocodile prowl among exotic birds and plants. The Egyptian influence on the exterior is more chaste. Here, enormous doors in severe trapezoidal style define the architect's intentions to pay homage at once to Attic Greek, Pompeiian and Egyptian style. It is noteworthy for its unique use of colors both inside and outside. Every room in the museum has a unique ceiling decoration in the grotesque style. The outside is adorned with a frieze depicting Thorvaldsen's homecoming from Rome in 1838, made by Jørgen Sonne.

== Collections ==
The museum displays a comprehensive collection of the artist's works in marble as well as plaster, including the original plaster models used in the making of cast bronze and marble statues and reliefs, which are now on display in museums, churches, and at other locations around the world. The museum also features paintings, Greek, Roman and Egyptian antiques, drawings, and prints that Thorvaldsen collected during his lifetime, as well as a wide array of personal belongings that he used in his work and everyday life.

== Gallery ==
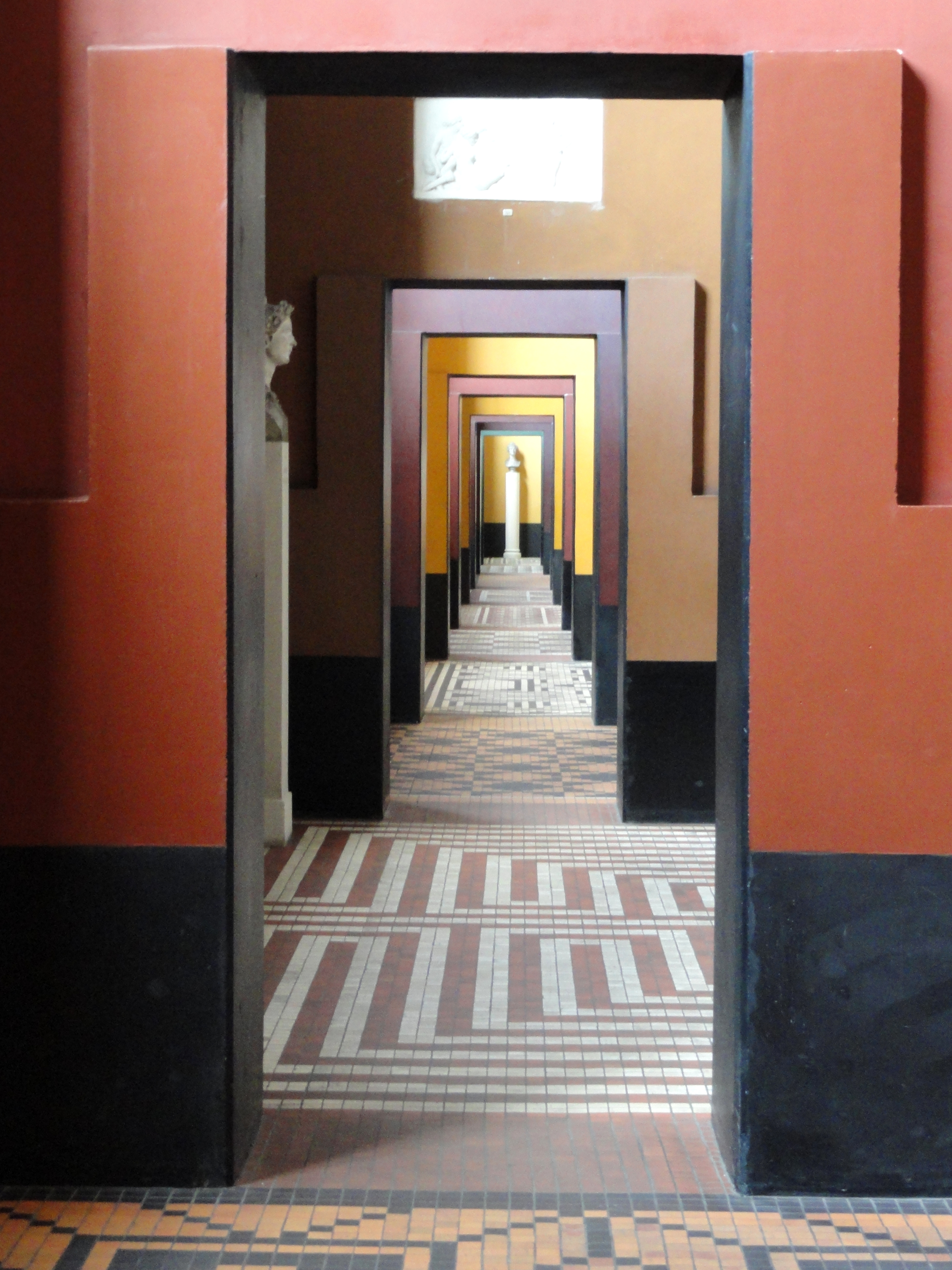
Interior

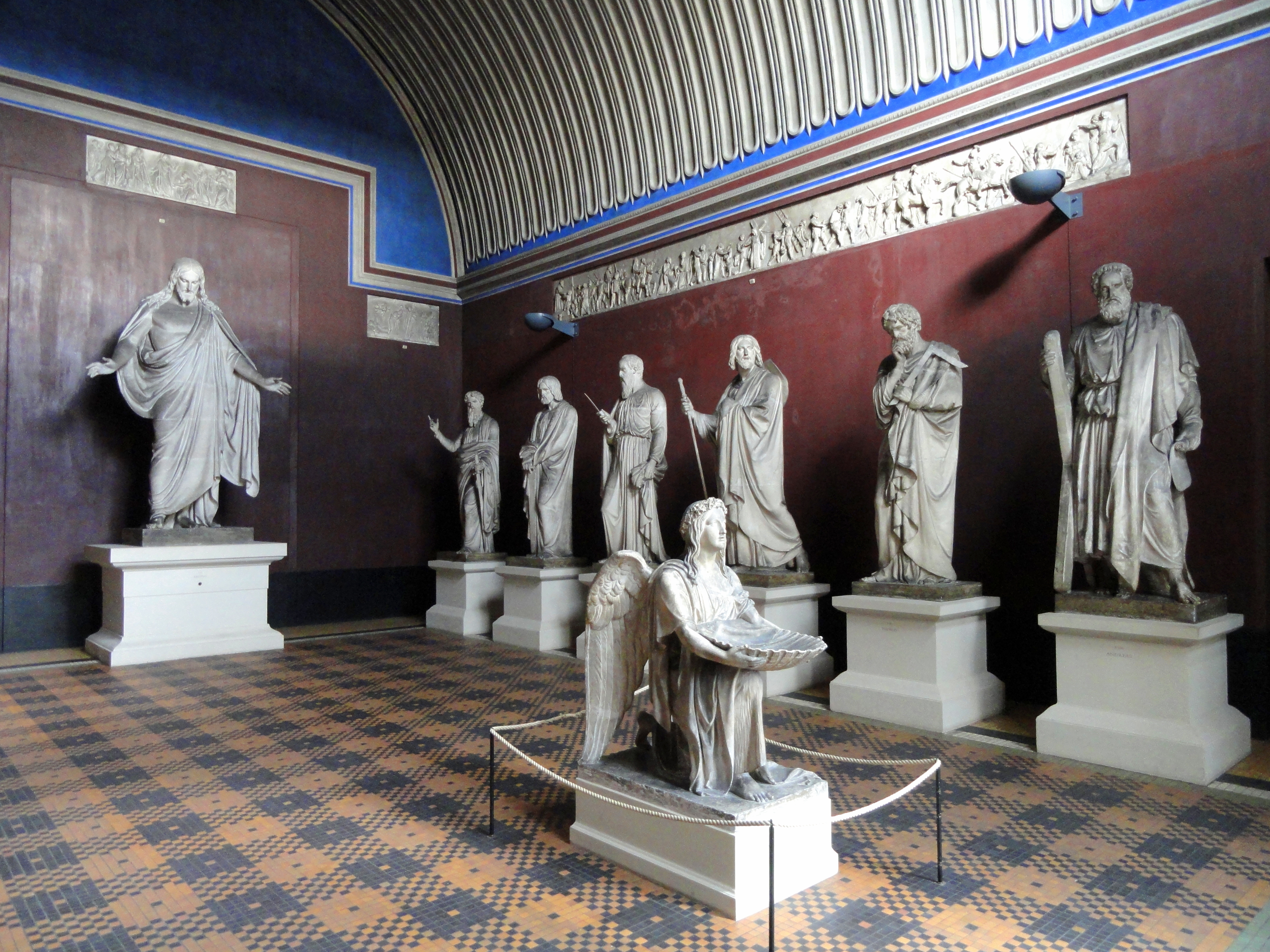
Gallery

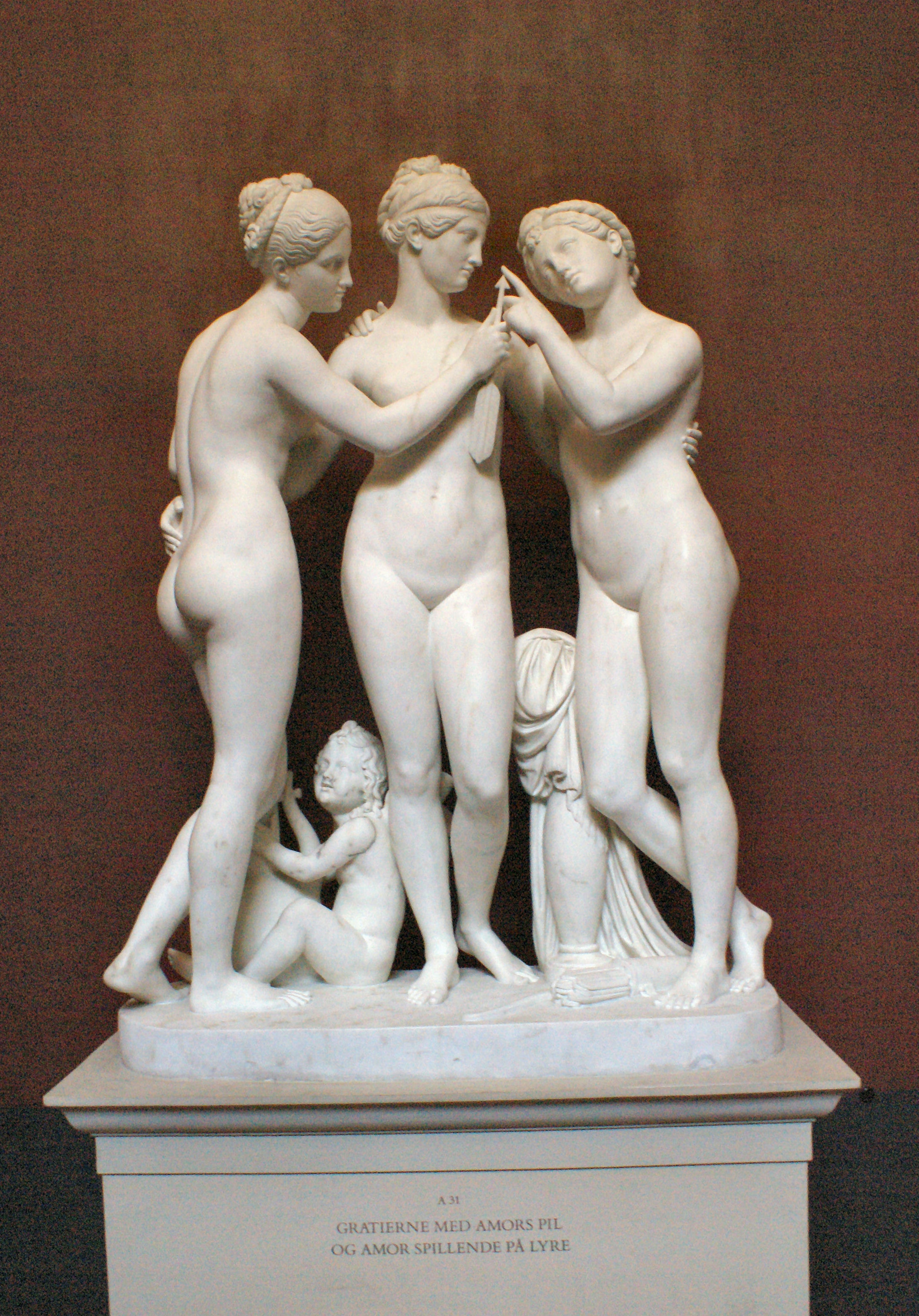
The Three Graces with Cupid

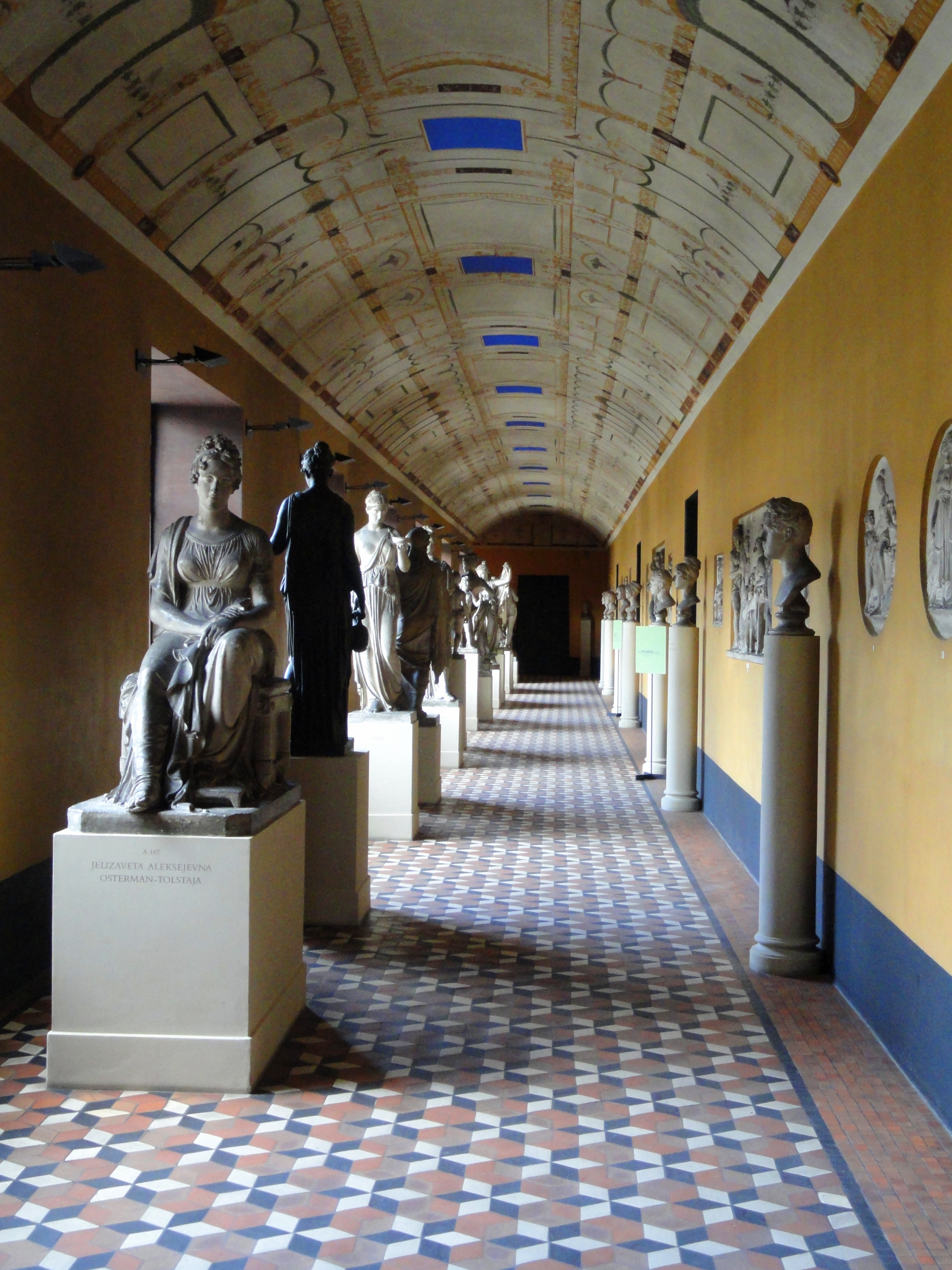
Hallway

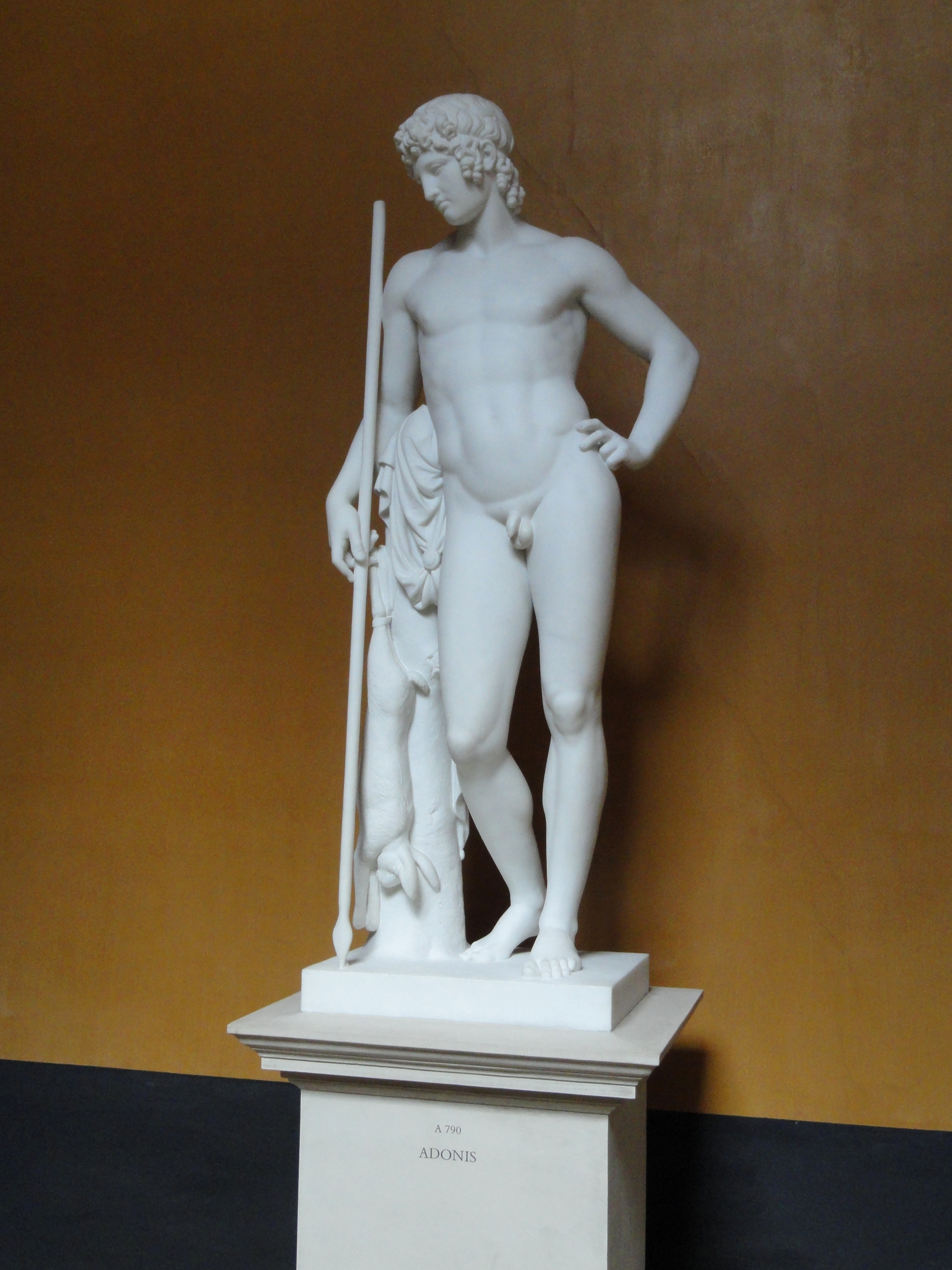
Adonis

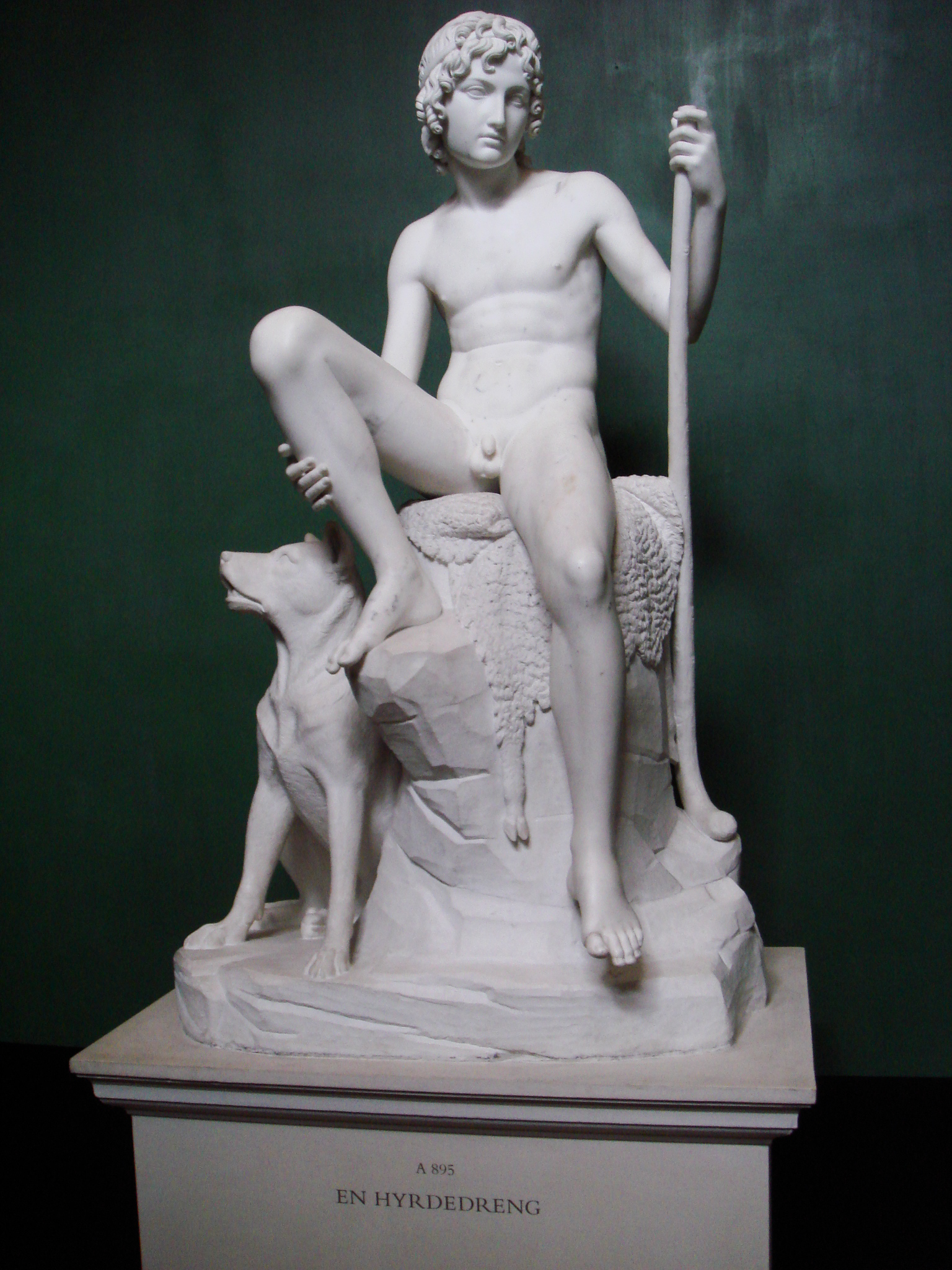
The Shepherd

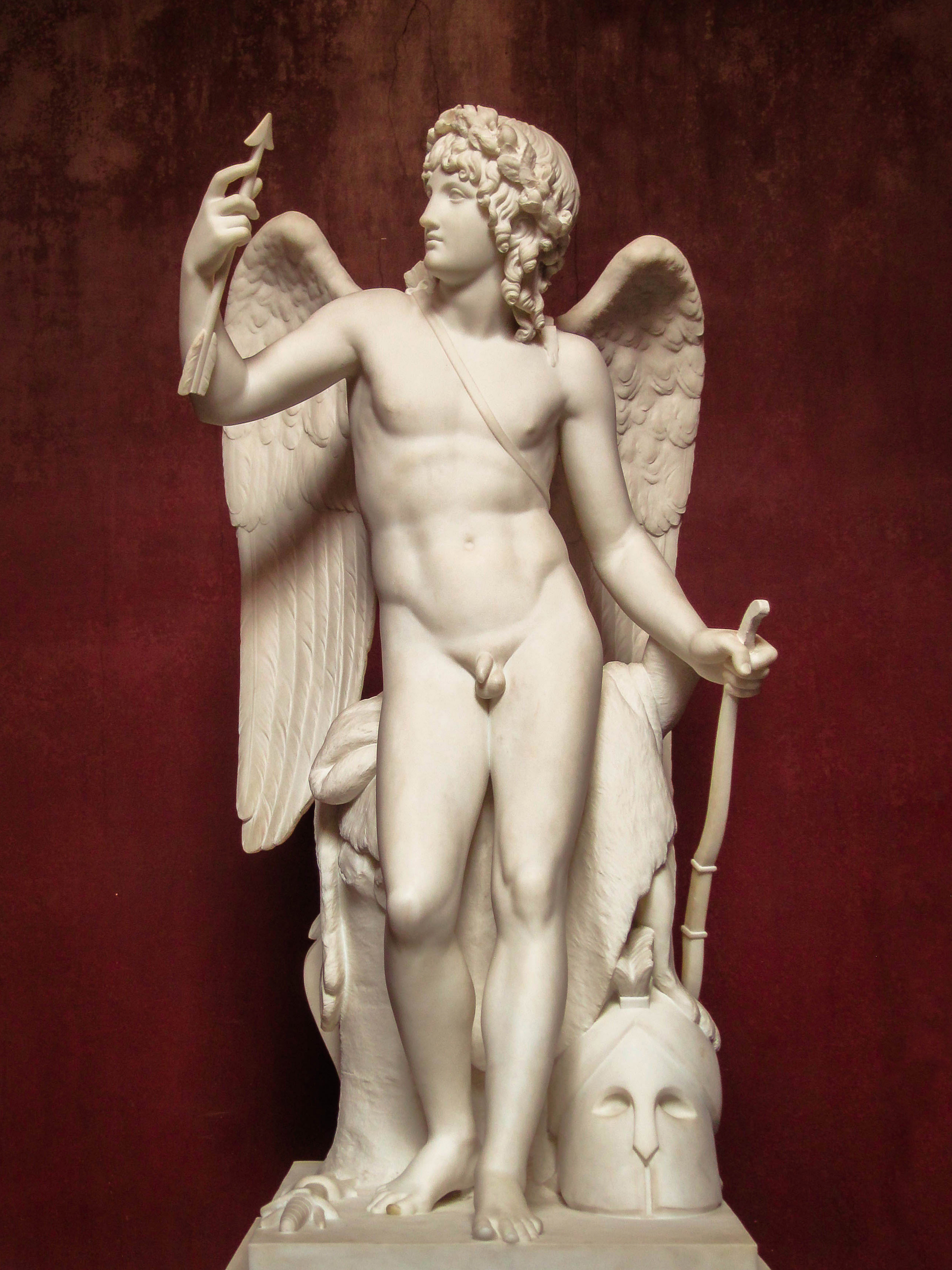
Cupid

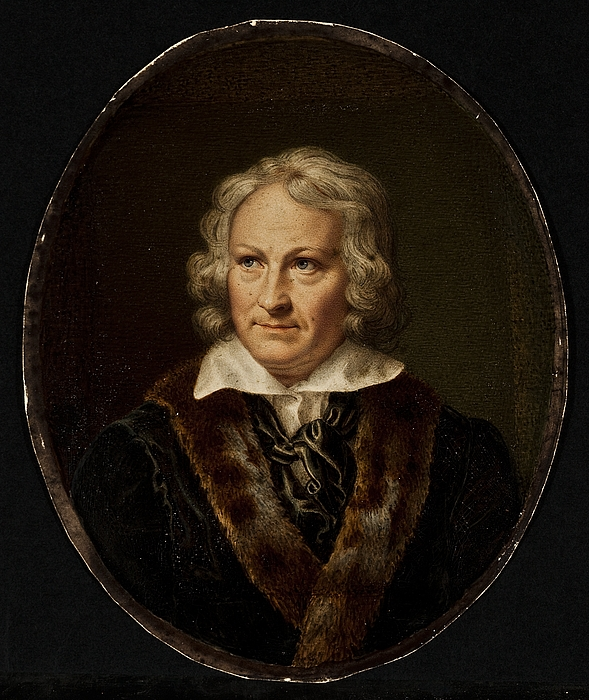
Portrait of Thorvaldsen by Floriano Pietrocola

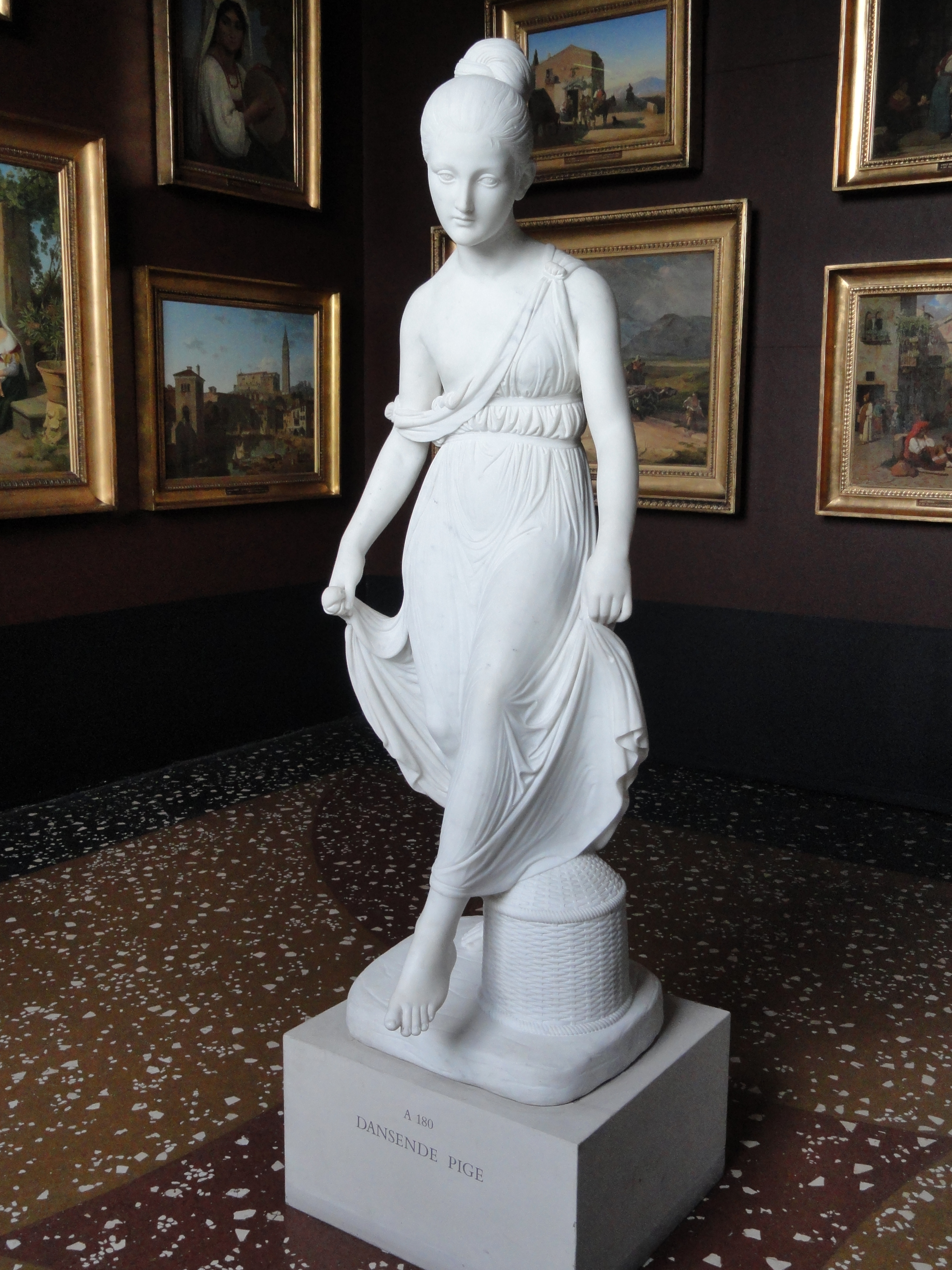
Young Dancing Girl

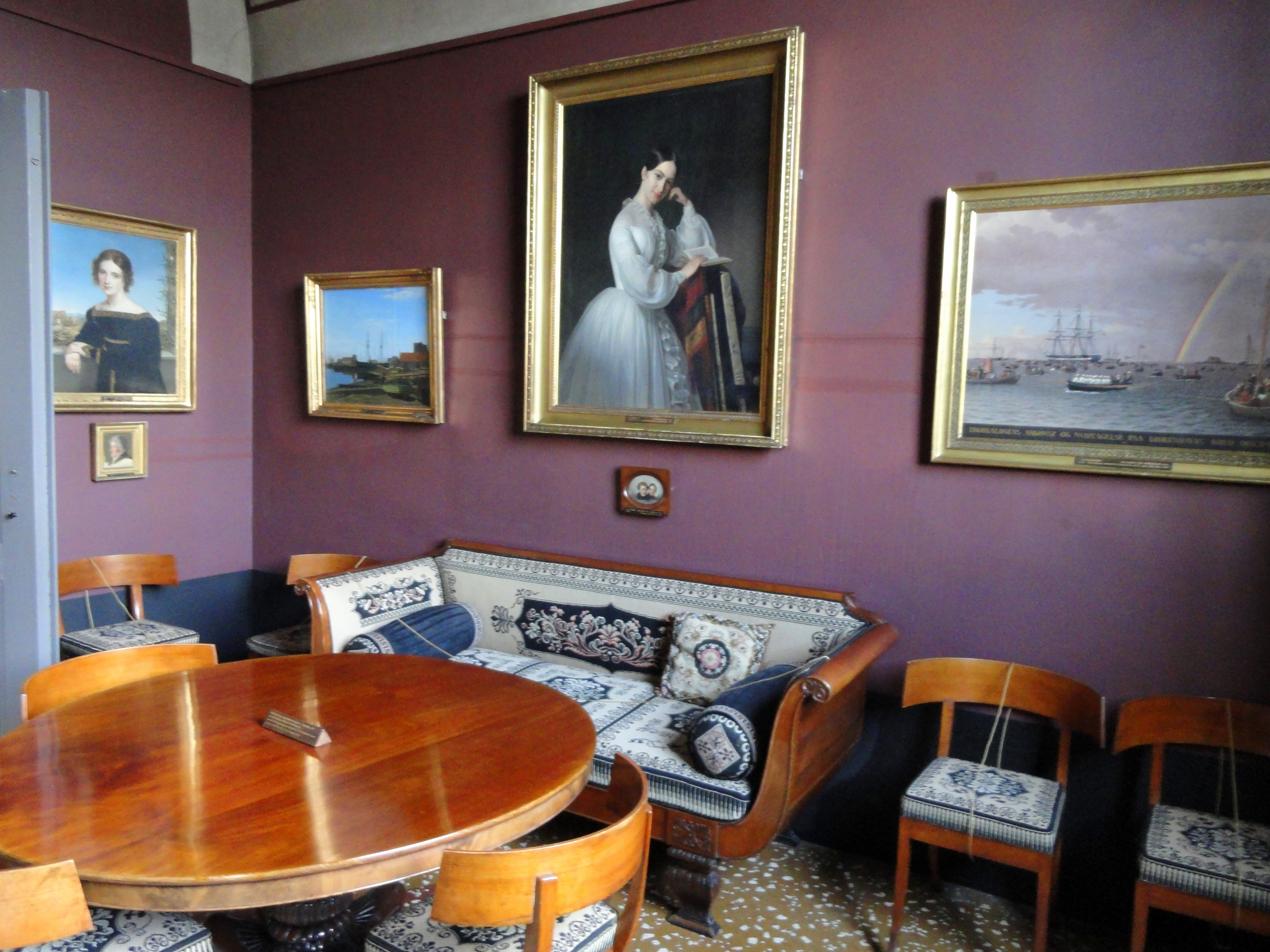
Room

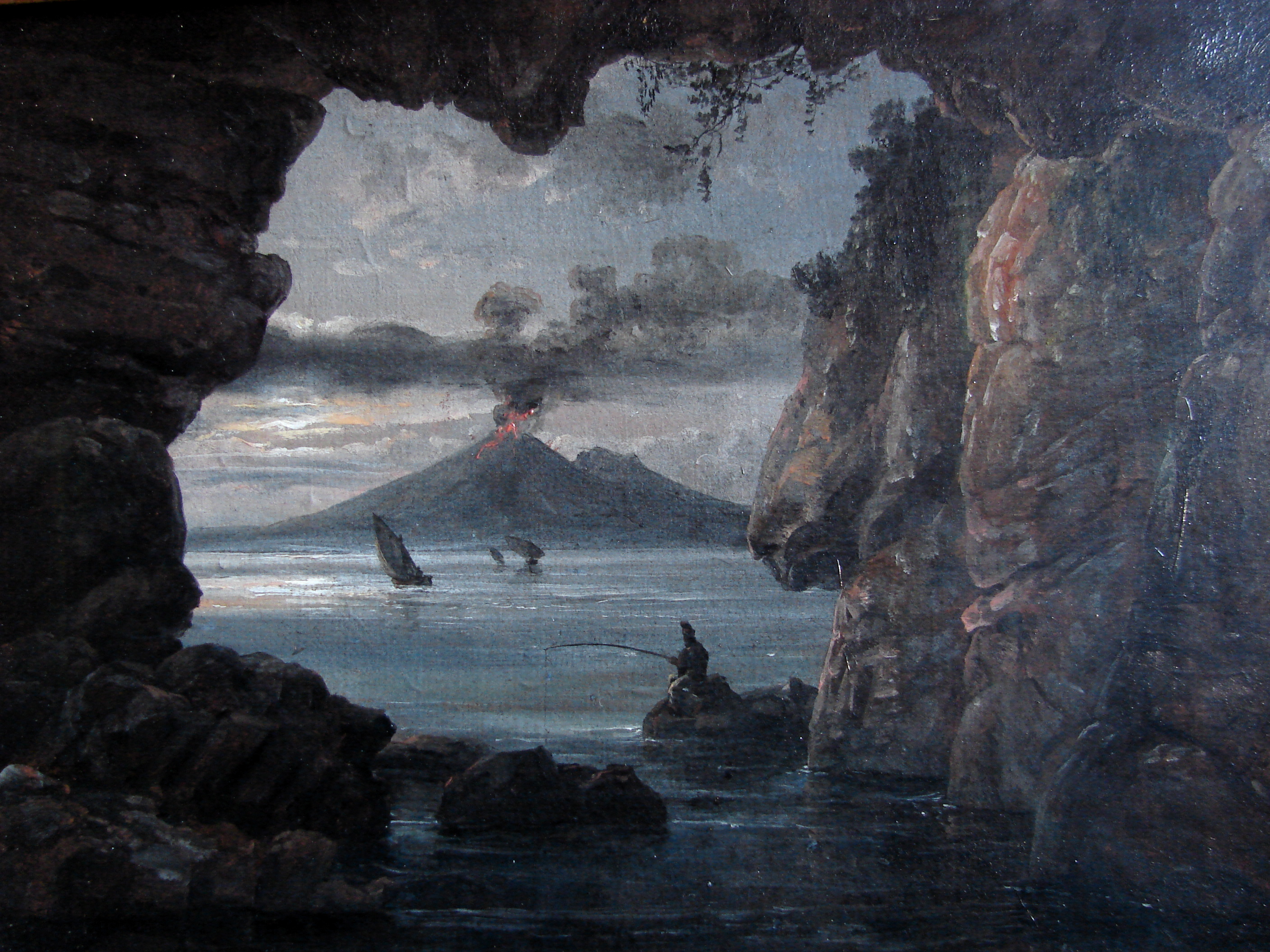
Painting from Thorvaldsen's own collection by Johan Christian Dahl

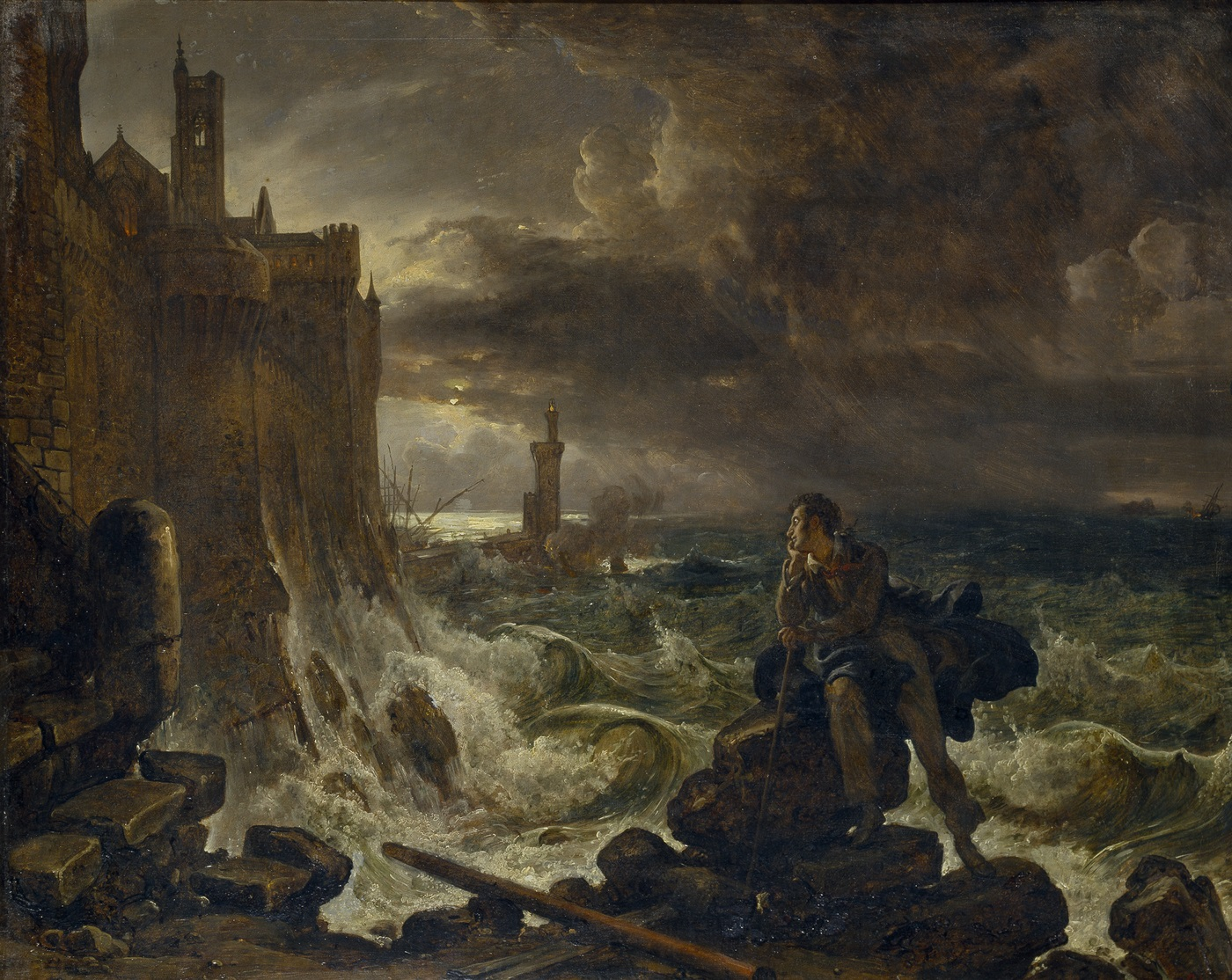
Painting from Thorvaldsen's own collection by Franz Ludwig Catel

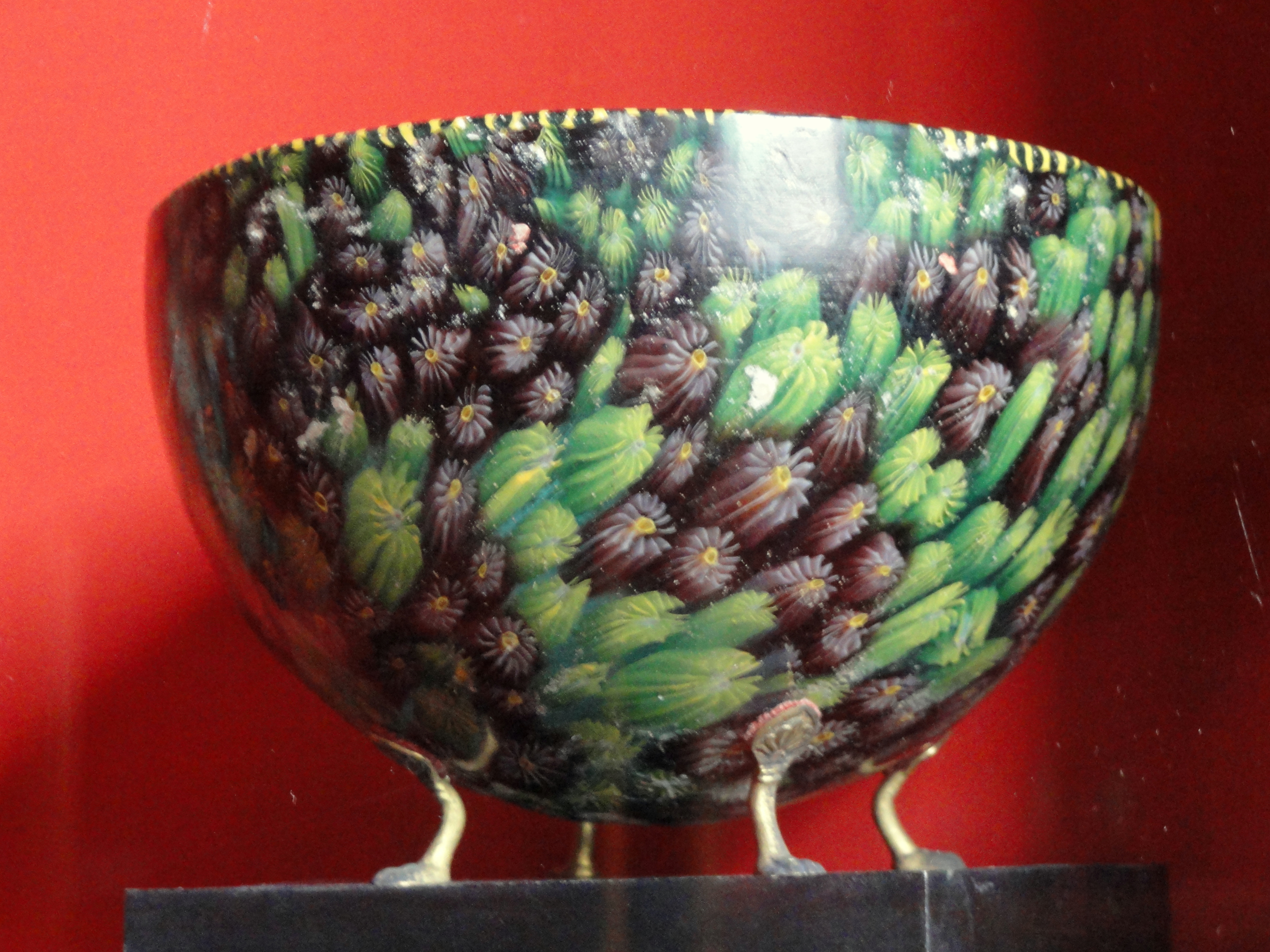
Bowl
"Thorvaldsen Museum "

== In popular culture ==
Thorvaldsens Museum is used as a location in the following films:

- Alle gaar rundt og forelsker sig (1941)
- Vi kunne ha' det saa rart (1942)
- Naar man kun er ung (1943)
- Mød mig på Cassiopeia (1951)
- Dorte (1951)
- Ved Kongelunden (1953)
- Kvindelist og kærlighed (1960)
- Forelsket i København (1960)
- Stine og drengene (1969)
- Olsen-banden går i krig (1978)
- Snøvsen ta'r springet (1994)

== See also ==
- List of single-artist museums
