= Henning Frederik Feilberg =

Danish pastor, author and folklorist (1831–1921)

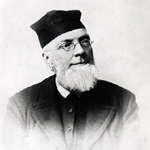
- Henning Frederik Feilberg
- Born: August 6, 1831; Hillerød, Denmark
- Died: October 8, 1921 (aged 90); Askov, Denmark
- Occupations: Pastor, folklorist, author
- Spouse: Louise Anna Andersen von Nutzhorn (m. 1860; d. 1897)
- Children: 6
- Writing career
- Language: Danish
- Notable works: Dansk Bondeliv (1889–99), Jul (1904), Bidrag til en ordbog over jyske almuesmål (1886–1914)

Henning Frederik Feilberg (6 August 1831 in Hillerød – 8 October 1921 in Askov), was a Danish pastor, author and folklorist. His research and publications represent significant contributions to the field of Danish folklore.

== Biography ==
Feilberg moved with his family to southern Jutland as a small child, later becoming a pastor there, following in his father's footsteps. In 1856, his interest in philology and folklore was encouraged by the time he spent working as a curate with Eiler Henning Hagerup in Store Solt to the south of Flensburg. In 1869, when he was a pastor in Brørup, he took a renewed interest in folklore, contributing to the journal Nordisk Månedsskrift. This led to a journey to Norway where he met Eilert Sundt. He married in 1860 and had six children to Louise Anna Andersen von Nutzhorn (1831-1897).

In 1891, on his retirement, he moved to Askov where he worked on a voluntary basis as a high school teacher while devoting the rest of his life to folklore. His collection and research was based on material from Jutland although he treated the subject from an international viewpoint, modelling his work on that of the Norwegian Eilert Sundt and Andrew Lang and Edward Tylor from England. His extensive library of some 4,000 volumes provided comprehensive, international coverage of ethnology. By leaving his collection to a public institution, he can be credited for playing a significant role in the creation of the Danish Folklore Archives. He also helped founding the Danish Folklore Society (Danmarks Folkeminder) but he declined Axel Olrik's invitation to become a member of the board.

== Works ==
His two main areas of interest were dialectology and folklore, both of which were evidenced by his posthumous papers. His "Contribution to a Dictionary of Rural Jutlandic" (Bidrag til en ordbog over jyske almuesmål) (1886–1914) is so wide-ranging that it is virtually a Nordic encyclopedia of folklore, folk poetry, and folk beliefs. As a folklorist, he was particularly interested in researching basic phenomena, establishing relationships and providing general overviews (for example of peasant culture). His international approach is reflected in his collection of manuscripts, excerpts and records of foreign literature and his extensive correspondence with foreign scholars. His unpublished collection of some 250,000 references to the 19th and early 20th century literature of folklore is still considered an important reference work.

His most significant works on folklore are Dansk Bondeliv (Danish Farm Life, 1889–99) and Jul (Christmas, 1904).

== See also ==
- Danish folklore
