= Axel Olrik =

Danish folklorist and medieval historiography scholar

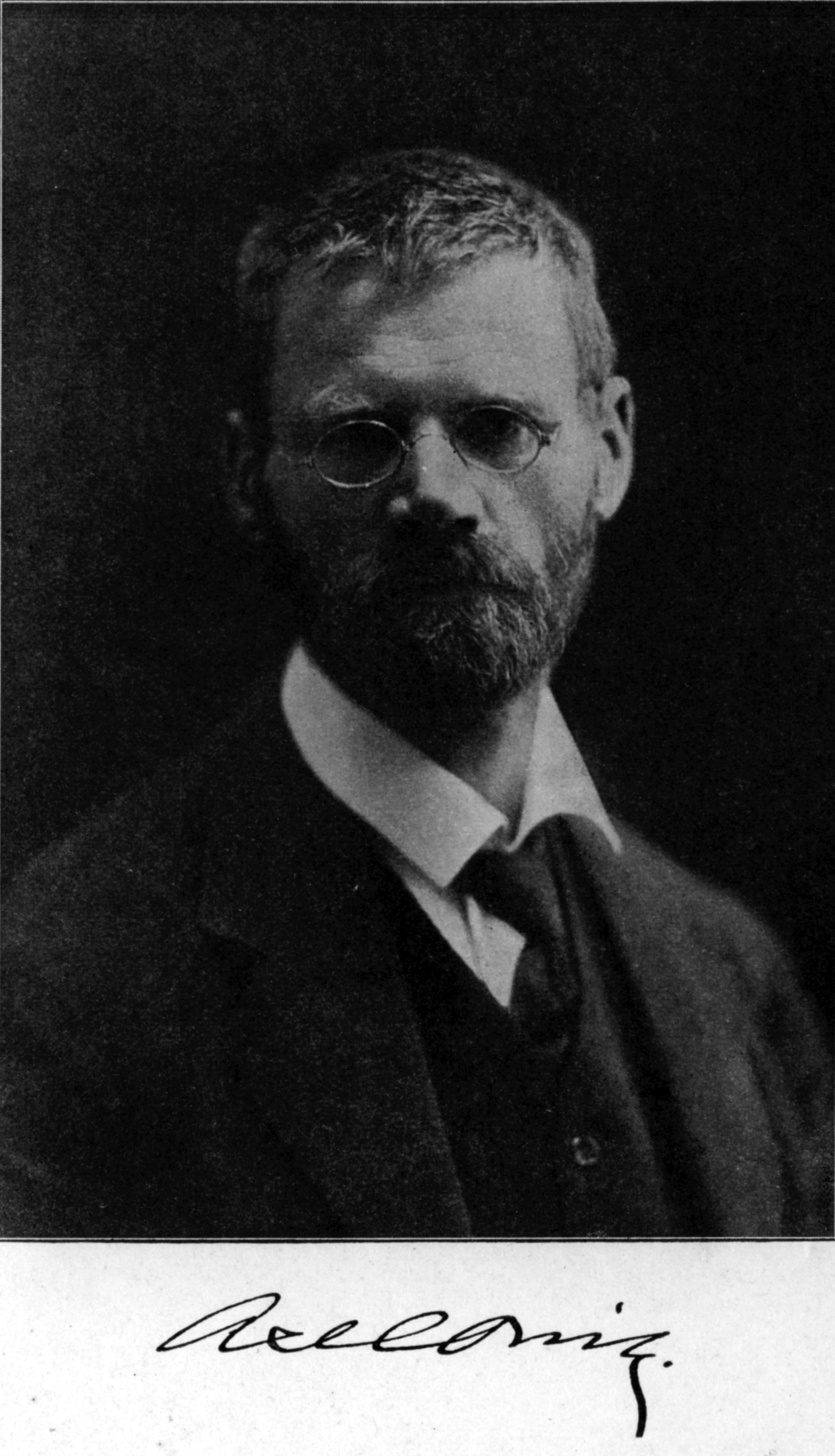
Axel Olrik, from the posthumous publication of his Nogle grundsætninger for sagnforskning

Axel Olrik (3 July 1864 – 17 February 1917) was a Danish folklorist and scholar of mediaeval historiography, and a pioneer in the methodical study of oral narrative.

Olrik was born in Frederiksberg, the son of the artist Henrik Olrik. Artist Dagmar Olrik, judge Eyvind Olrik, historian Hans Olrik and cultural historian Jørgen Olrik were his siblings.

== Career ==
Olrik began his studies at the University of Copenhagen in 1881. In 1886, he won the university gold medal for an essay on the age of the Eddic poems; he received his Master of Arts in Nordic Philology in 1887 and his Ph.D. in 1892. The following year, he became a private docent at the university. On 1 April 1896 he was awarded a temporary position in Scandinavian folklore, which on 9 April 1913 was converted into an extraordinary professorship. Apart from a period at Kristiania (now Oslo) in 1892 studying with Moltke Moe, he spent his entire career at the University of Copenhagen.

== Scholarly work ==
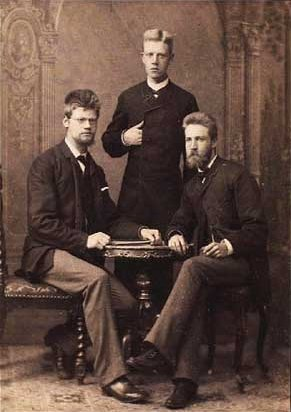
Axel Olrik (left) with his brothers Eyvind and Hans, photograph by Ludvig Grundtvig

=== Folklore ===
While a student, Olrik soon came under the influence of Svend Grundtvig, and until the latter's death in 1883, was treated almost like a son. His first major scholarly work was therefore a continuation of Grundtvig's work on the Danish ballads; with Danske Ridderviser (1898–1919) he continued the publication of Danmarks gamle Folkeviser, which was in turn continued after his own death by his pupil Hakon Grüner-Nielsen. Olrik was able to draw more than Grundtvig on collected oral material; in 1888–89 he himself did some fieldwork collecting folksongs.

Grundtvig had amalgamated what he considered useful features from various versions of a folksong or ballad to produce a long, complex whole; Olrik, in contrast, sought to trace the history of the oral texts back to simple originals. He published several sample studies in Danske Studier, the journal he co-founded with Marius Kristensen in 1904, and in 1899–1909, with Ida Falbe-Hansen, he published a collection of reconstructed texts, Danske Folkeviser i Udvalg (Selection of Danish Folk Songs); in 1899–1904, an edition with melodic arrangements by Thomas Laub was published. These were very popular and were translated into German and English.

In addition to Danske Studier, Olrik together with Henning Frederik Feilberg and H. O. Lange founded the Danish folklore archive (Dansk Folkemindesamling), and served as its first president. He was also the first president of Danmarks Folkeminder, an association founded in 1908, and set up its committees for the study of folklore material and of placenames, both of which are now research institutes at the University of Copenhagen. In addition, with Kaarle Krohn and C. W. von Sydow, he co-founded the international organisation of Folklore Fellows in 1907, and the first issue of Folklore Fellows' Communications, of which he was co-editor from its inception in 1910, consists of an account by him of the Danish folklore archive. Upon his death, his professorship and with it folklore studies at the University of Copenhagen came to an end; the field was only revived in 1961.

=== Mediaeval historiography and culture ===
Olrik's Ph.D. dissertation, Forsøg på en tvedeling af kilderne til Sakses oldhistorie ("Attempts at a two-part division of the sources for Saxo's history of the Danes"), was on the sources of Saxo Grammaticus' Latin history of the Danes, Gesta Danorum. Based on the presence or absence of West Norse names and familiarity with West Norse geography and with material in pre-existing Icelandic historical works, he believed it was possible to distinguish passages in which Saxo had drawn on Norwegian and Icelandic sources and those where he had used native Danish traditions. This work led him to the view that the religious, heroic and historical traditions of the different Scandinavian peoples had already diverged by the Viking Age, and he sought to trace the origins, development and regional variation of individual works and concepts. He published many articles on Scandinavian religion, onomastics, and related subjects, including an interpretation of the images on the Golden Horns of Gallehus which was published in 1918, after his death, studies of Ragnarök, and a book on Scandinavian paganism in the Viking Age, Nordisk Åndsliv i Vikingetid og tidlig Middelalder, all of which were revised and completed by his student Hans Ellekilde and published in 1926 and 1951 as Nordens Gudeverden.

=== Oral narrative ===
Olrik eventually developed a system for the study of oral narrative (which he called sagn - 'saga'), including principles for the study of sources (developed with Kristian Erslev), a theory of transmission and most influentially, a theory of form which he called "epic laws". This was based on an idea of Moltke Moe's, but Olrik's approach is structural whereas Moe sought to derive rules for the historical development of narratives. His unfinished work on the study of oral narrative was published posthumously in 1921 by Ellekilde as Nogle grundsætninger for sagnforskning.

== Private life ==
In 1893 he married Margrete Sofie Eleonore Hasselquist, who died in November 1911. He died in Øverød on 17 February 1917 from pneumonia following a successful operation on his ear.

== Honours ==
In 1911 Olrik was named the first external member of the Finnish Academy of Sciences. In 1914 he was elected foreign member of the Royal Netherlands Academy of Arts and Sciences.

== Selected publications ==
- Kilderne til Sakses oldhistorie: en literaturhistorisk undersøgelse Volume 1 Forsøg pa en tvedeling af kilderne til Sakses oldhistorie. Copenhagen: Wroblewski, 1892 OCLC 163079555. Volume 2 Sakses oldhistorie, norrøne sagaer og Danske sagn. Copenhagen: Wroblewski, 1894 OCLC 791764264 (based on his dissertation)
- (with Ida Falbe-Hansen). Danske Folkeviser i Udvalg. 2 vols. Copenhagen: Gyldendal, 1899, 1909 OCLC 788836874
- A Book of Danish Ballads. Tr. E. M. Smith-Dampier. 1939. Repr. Granger index reprint series. Freeport, New York: Books for Libraries, 1968. OCLC 296014 (translation of above)
- Om Ragnarok. Volume 1 Copenhagen: Gad, 1902, first printed in Årbøger for Nordisk Oldkyndighed og Historie 1902, pp. 157–291. OCLC 787545101. Volume 2 Ragnarokforestillingernes udspring, first printed in Danske Studier 1913. OCLC 66588720 2 vols. Copenhagen: Gad, 1914. OCLC 3753257
- Danmarks heltedigtning: en oldtidsstudie Volume 1 Rolf Krake og den ældre Skjoldungrackke Copenhagen: Gad, 1903 OCLC 312510407. Volume 2 Starkad den Gamle og den yngre Skjoldungrække. Copenhagen: Gad, 1910 OCLC 312510893 (Remaining 5 volumes not completed; notes held at the Danish folklore archive)
- "Episke love i folkedigtningen". Danske Studier, 5 (1908): 69-89 (https://web.archive.org/web/20160309204457/http://danskestudier.dk/materiale/1908.pdf). Olrik expressed the same ideas in German in 'Epische Gesetze der Volksdichtung', Zeitschrift für deutsches Altertum und Deutsche Literatur, 51 (1909), 1–12, which was translated into English as 'Epic Laws of Folk Narrative', in The Study of Folklore, ed. by Alan Dundes (Englewood Cliffs, N.J.: Prentice-Hall, 1965), pp. 129–41 OCLC 523555
- Nordisk Åndsliv i Vikingetid og tidlig Middelalder. Copenhagen: Gyldendal, 1907. OCLC 492626927
- (completed by Hans Lavrids Ellekilde). Nogle grundsætninger for sagnforskning. Danmarks folkeminder 23. Copenhagen: Schønberg, 1921. OCLC 2210807
- Principles for Oral Narrative Research. Tr. Kirsten Wolf and Jody Jensen. Folklore studies in translation. Bloomington: Indiana University, 1992. ISBN 9780253341754 (translation of above)
- (revised and completed by Hans Ellekilde). Nordens Gudeverden. Volume 1 Vætter og helligdomme Copenhagen: Gad, 1926. OCLC 492626711 Volume 2 Årets ring Copenhagen: Gad, 1951. OCLC 257695200
