= Merry Men =

Outlaw group following Robin Hood

Robin Hood and the Merry Men (illustration by Pablo Marcos, c. 1995)

The Merry Men are the group of outlaws who follow Robin Hood in English literature and folklore. The members of the group appear both collectively and individually in the earliest ballads about Robin Hood and remain popular in modern adaptations as Robin Hood's like-minded companions or sidekicks.

== History ==
The Merry Men are Robin Hood's group who work to rob from the rich and give to the poor. They antagonize the tyrannical rule of Prince John while King Richard is fighting in the Crusades. This also puts them in conflict with Prince John's minions, Guy of Gisbourne and the Sheriff of Nottingham.

The early ballads give specific names to only three companions: Little John, Much the Miller's Son, and William Scarlock or Scathelock, the Will Scarlet of later traditions. Joining them are between 20 and "seven score" (140) outlawed yeomen. The most prominent of the Merry Men is Robin's second-in-command, Little John. He appears in the earliest ballads and is mentioned in even earlier sources, such as Andrew of Wyntoun's Orygynale Chronicle of around 1420 and Walter Bower's expansion of the Scotichronicon, completed around 1440. Later ballads name additional Merry Men, some of whom appear in only one or two ballads while others, like the minstrel Alan-a-Dale and the jovial Friar Tuck, became fully attached to the legend. Several of the Robin Hood ballads tell the story of how individual Merry Men join the group; this is frequently accomplished by defeating Robin in a duel.

The phrase "merry man" was originally a generic term for any follower or companion of an outlaw, knight, or similar leader. Robin's band are called "mery men" in the oldest known Robin Hood ballad, "Robin Hood and the Monk", which survives in a manuscript completed after 1450.

== Members ==
- Little John – Robin Hood's lieutenant. Later stories depict him as a huge man who joins the band after fighting Robin with quarterstaves over a river.
- Much the Miller's Son – A grown man and a seasoned fighter in the early ballads. Later stories depict him as one of the youngest of the Merry Men.
- Will Scarlet – Another very early companion, appearing in ballads like A Gest of Robyn Hode. In "Robin Hood Newly Revived" he is a skilled swordsman and Robin's nephew.
- Arthur a Bland – Appears in one ballad, "Robin Hood and the Tanner". He is an accused poacher who bests Robin in a fight and joins the band.
- David of Doncaster – Appears in one ballad, "Robin Hood and the Golden Arrow". The sheriff is giving an archery contest, and David, "a brave young man", warns Robin against going, because it is a trap, which advice inspires Robin to take precautions against capture. He reappears in later adaptations, both books and movies.
- Will Stutely – Appears in two ballads, "Robin Hood and Little John" and "Robin Hood Rescuing Will Stutly". In the former, he gives Little John his outlaw name; in the latter, he must be rescued after he is caught spying by the Sheriff of Nottingham. Stutely appears in the occasional film and various Robin Hood children's novels, such as Howard Pyle's The Merry Adventures of Robin Hood, which includes the tale of Will's rescue and also mentions that he likes to play pranks.
- Friar Tuck – Resident clergyman of the band. Tuck developed separately from the Robin Hood tradition; similar characters appear in 15th- and 16th-century plays, and an early 15th-century outlaw used the alias Friar Tuck. A fighting friar appears in "Robin Hood and the Curtal Friar", though he is not named. Robin and the friar engage in a battle of wits, which at one point involves the holy man carrying the outlaw across a river, only to toss him in. In the end, the friar joins the Merry Men. Later stories portray Tuck as more ale-loving and jovial than belligerent.
- Alan-a-Dale – A roving minstrel. He appears in the later ballad "Robin Hood and Allan-a-Dale", in which Robin helps him rescue his sweetheart who is being forced into marriage with another man. Despite his relatively late appearance, he became a popular character in later versions.
- Gilbert Whitehand (or Gilbert with the White Hand) – Portrayed in A Gest of Robyn Hode as a skilled archer nearly equal to Robin. He appears along with other Merry Men during the shooting match for the gold and silver arrow and again in Barnsdale Forest during a visit by the disguised king.
- Reynold Greenleaf – Although this name was used as an alias by Little John in A Gest of Robyn Hode when he tricked his way into the Sheriff's service, there is another Reynold presented later in the ballad as a separate member of the Merry Men who competed in the archery match for the gold and silver arrow alongside Robin, Little John and others of the band.
- Maid Marian – Robin Hood's romantic interest. Marian developed separately from the Robin Hood tradition; the medieval French play Jeu de Robin et Marion tells the story of the shepherdess Marian and the knight Robin, unrelated to Robin Hood. The medieval archetype of Marian became associated with English and Scottish May Day festivities and was eventually associated with Robin Hood. She is the protagonist of "Robin Hood and Maid Marian" and is mentioned in "Robin Hood and Queen Katherine" and "Robin Hood's Golden Prize".
- The Tinker – A tinker (a tinsmith and mender of utensils) who tries to capture Robin for the reward money but eventually becomes one of his Merry Men. Though he is not named in the original ballad "Robin Hood and the Tinker" he is given various names in later adaptations. Howard Pyle calls him Wat o' the Crabstaff (a reference to the quarterstaff he uses as a weapon), while in Bold Robin Hood and His Outlaw Band by Louis Rhead he is named Dick o' Banbury.
- The Cook – A cook who lived in the household of the Sheriff. Some time after Little John tricked his way into the Sheriff's service, he and the cook fight each other with swords. Neither one besting the other, they become friends and the cook is invited to join Robin's band. Though he is not named in A Gest of Robyn Hode (in which he first appears), he is given various names in later adaptations. In The Life and Adventures of Robin Hood by John B. Marsh he is known by the epithet Firepan, and his skill as a cook is matched by his fame as a swordsman. In Stories of Robin Hood and His Merry Outlaws by J. Walker McSpadden, Much is identified as the cook.
- The Ranger – A forester who was responsible for protecting the king's deer. When he encounters Robin and learns that he is poaching, they fight with swords and then with quarterstaves. The forester (who is not named) defeats Robin who then offers him a place among his company of outlaws as told in "Robin Hood and the Ranger".
- The Pinder – A pinder (an impounder of stray animals) who encounters Robin, Little John and Will Scarlet together. Like other tales in which Robin duels an opponent and meets his match, they engage in swordplay until a truce is made. The pinder is then invited to join the Merry Men, as told in "The Jolly Pinder of Wakefield". Though the character is not identified in the ballad, he is named George a Greene in the Robin Hood play George a Greene, the Pinner of Wakefield printed in 1599, the 1632 chapbook The Famous History of George a Greene, Pinder of Wakefield, and other similar works of the period. This is the name likewise used by Maude Radford Warren in her 1914 collection Robin Hood and His Merry Men where he also serves as a self-appointed guardian of the peace. Henry Gilbert in Robin Hood (1912) calls him Sim of Wakefield.
- The Scotchman – A Scot who Robin meets while on a journey north. He offers to serve Robin who refuses at first, thinking that he would prove false, but then he agrees on the condition that they first engage in a duel. The Scot wins the fight, as told in "Robin Hood and the Scotchman".
- The Three Yeomen – Three yeomen (landowning farmers) who are about to be hanged by the Sheriff of Nottingham for poaching when they are saved by Robin and a company of archers. They are taken back to the safety of the greenwood and join Robin's band, as told in "Robin Hood and the Beggar" (version 1).
- Right-hitting Brand – An otherwise unknown individual mentioned in company with several more well-known Merry Men in Anthony Munday's Metropolis Coronata, printed in 1615.

=== Modern additions ===
Several modern adaptations add a member to the group who is a Moor or Saracen. This began with the 1984–1986 television series Robin of Sherwood, which includes the character Nasir (portrayed by Mark Ryan), a former hashshashin who joins the Merry Men. The character influenced the writers of the 1989–1994 BBC TV children's series Maid Marian and Her Merry Men, which features the black character Barrington (portrayed by Danny John Jules). 1991's Robin Hood: Prince of Thieves includes the Moor Azeem (portrayed by Morgan Freeman). Jamie Foxx portrayed Yahya ibn Umar, a version of Little John, in the 2018 film Robin Hood.

== See also ==
- Social banditry
