= Pedlar =

Pedlar may refer to:

- Pedlar or peddler, a door-to-door seller

== Entertainment ==
- The Pedlar (or The Wayfarer), a painting by Hieronymus Bosch
- The Isis Pedlar, a novel
- The Bold Pedlar and Robin Hood, a Child Ballad
- Robin Hood and the Pedlars, a Child Ballad
- Pedlar of Swaffham, a folktale

== People ==
=== Given names and nicknames ===
- Thomas Palmer known as Pedlar Palmer (1876–1949), British boxer who held the world bantamweight championship, 1895–1899
- Alfred Brian Palmer (1899–1993), Royal Navy captain who had the nickname "Pedlar Palmer"

=== Surnames ===
- Arthur Vercoe Pedlar (1932–2022), British clown
- David Pedlar, Director of Research at the National Headquarters of Veterans Affairs Canada
- Philip Pedlar (1899–?), Welsh professional footballer
- Sylvia Pedlar (1901–1972), American lingerie designer

== Places ==
- Pedlar, West Virginia
- Pedlar Creek (Arapahoe Creek tributary), a stream in Missouri
- Pedlar River, Virginia
- Pedlar Wildlife Management Area in Monongalia County, West Virginia

== Other ==
- Pedlar (fur trade), fur traders in colonial North America
