= Robin Hood and the Shepherd =

Traditional song

Robin Hood and the Shepherd is a story in the Robin Hood canon which has survived as, among other forms, a late seventeenth-century English broadside ballad, and is one (#135) out of several ballads about the medieval folk hero that form part of the Child ballad collection, which is one of the most comprehensive collections of traditional English ballads.

== Synopsis ==
While strolling through the forest one day, Robin Hood encounters a shepherd lying on the ground and demands to know what he has in his bottle and bag; when the shepherd refuses, Robin says he will coerce him with his sword if he does not tell him. Robin lays twenty pounds on a fight, and the shepherd agrees to bet his bottle and bag against it, since he has no money. They fight hard from ten to four o'clock, and, although Robin's sword serves him well, he is struck until the blood runs from his head, and eventually falls to the ground. The shepherd urges him to stand and admit that he has lost. Instead, Robin asks if he may blow his horn, the shepherd agrees, and Little John arrives. Robin entreats him to fight the shepherd on his behalf. Although Little John fights long and hard with the shepherd as well, the shepherd's hook defeats him in the end. As the shepherd is about to lay into Little John further, Robin agrees that the bet was won and Little John agrees.

== Historical and cultural significance ==
This ballad is part of a group of ballads about Robin Hood that in turn, like many of the popular ballads collected by Francis James Child, were in their time considered a threat to the Protestant religion. Puritan writers, like Edward Dering writing in 1572, considered such tales "'childish follye'" and "'witless devices.'" Writing of the Robin Hood ballads after A Gest of Robyn Hode, their Victorian collector Francis Child claimed that variations on the "'Robin met with his match'" theme, such as this ballad, are "sometimes wearisome, sometimes sickening," and that "a considerable part of the Robin Hood poetry looks like char-work done for the petty press, and should be judged as such." Child had also called the Roxburghe and Pepys collections (in which some of these ballads are included) "'veritable dung-hills [...], in which only after a great deal of sickening grubbing, one finds a very moderate jewel.'" However, as folklorist and ethnomusicologist Mary Ellen Brown has pointed out, Child's denigration of the later Robin Hood ballads is evidence of an ideological view he shared with many other scholars of his time who wanted to exclude cheap printed ballads such as these from their pedigree of the oral tradition and early literature. Child and others were reluctant to include such broadsides in their collections because they thought they "regularized the text, rather than reflecting and/or participating in tradition, which fostered multiformity." On the other hand, the broadsides are significant in themselves as showing, as English jurist and legal scholar John Selden (1584–1654) puts it, "'how the wind sits. As take a straw and throw it up in the air; you shall see by that which way the wind is, which you shall not do by casting up a stone. More solid things do not show the complexion of the times so well as ballads and libels.'" Even though the broadsides are cultural ephemera, unlike weightier tomes, they are important because they are markers of contemporary "current events and popular trends." It has been speculated that in his time Robin Hood represented a figure of peasant revolt, but the English medieval historian J. C. Holt has argued that the tales developed among the gentry, that he is a yeoman rather than a peasant, and that the tales do not mention peasants' complaints, such as oppressive taxes. Moreover, he does not seem to rebel against societal standards but to uphold them by being munificent, devout, and affable. Other scholars have seen the literature around Robin Hood as reflecting the interests of the common people against feudalism. The latter interpretation supports Selden's view that popular ballads provide a valuable window onto the thoughts and feelings of the common people on topical matters: for the peasantry, Robin Hood may have been a redemptive figure.

== Library/archival holdings ==
The English Broadside Ballad Archive at the University of California, Santa Barbara holds six seventeenth-century broadside ballad versions of this tale: two in the Roxburghe ballad collection at the British Library (3.284-5 and 2.392), two in the Pepys collection at Magdalene College at the University of Cambridge (2.115 and 2.112), and two in the Crawford collection at the National Library of Scotland (27 and 1162).
