= Robin Hood and the Prince of Aragon =

Traditional song

Robin Hood and the Prince of Aragon (Roud 3983, Child 129) is an English-language folk song. The song portrays Robin Hood in a tale of chivalrous adventures, such as are uncommon in his ballads, and has rarely been featured in later tales.

== Synopsis ==
Robin Hood, Will Scadlock and Little John hunt a deer. After they feast, Robin meets a black-dressed woman on a black horse. She tells them that the Prince of Aragon has besieged London to demand the princess for his wife. He will only give it up if champions defeat the prince and two giants, and has set a deadline of Midsummer. Robin Hood, Will Scadlock, and Little John arrive just in time; Robin defeats the prince and his giant minions.

Robin begs and receives a pardon for himself and his men. The princess chooses to marry Will. A noble weeps upon seeing him, because he had a son much like him, now dead, and Will says he is that son, still alive. They celebrate the wedding.
