= Robin Hood and the Pedlars =

Traditional song

Robin Hood and the Pedlars (Roud 3987, Child 137) is an English folk song, part of the Robin Hood canon.

== Synopsis ==
Robin Hood, Little John, and Will Scarlet meet up with three pedlars and urge them to stay; they go on. Robin shoots at one, striking through his pack to the skin, with force enough to kill him without the pack having been in the way. They throw down their packs and await Robin, but the first, Kit o Thirske, breaks Robin's bow. Robin insists that they give them time to get staves; then they fight, hard enough that all six regret it. A blow from Kit knocks Robin down, unconscious.

Little John and Will call off the fight, saying Robin is dead. Kit offers them a balsame to heal him. The pedlars go on to Nottingham, and Little John and Will tend Robin. As soon as he regains consciousness, he vomits the balsame, and all three of them are filthy.
