= Robin Hood Newly Revived =

Traditional song

"Robin Hood Newly Revived" (Child 128) is an English folk song that forms part of the Robin Hood canon, functioning as an origin story for Will Scarlet.

== Synopsis ==
Robin Hood and Little John are hunting when they see a finely dressed stranger shoot a deer. Robin says if he accepts it, he can be a yeoman in their band. The stranger threatens him, and forbids him to sound his horn. They aim arrows at each other, and Robin proposes that they fight with swords instead. They strike some blows. Robin asks him who he is, and he is Young Gamwell, and, because he killed his father's steward, he is seeking his uncle, who is called Robin Hood. That stops their fight, and they join the band. Little John asks why he is gone so long, and Robin says they were fighting, but Little John must not fight him. He names his nephew Scarlet.

== Sources ==
The chivalric romance The Tale of Gamelyn presents a similar tale of a man fleeing after the death of a servant. The name "Gamwell" is regarded as a possible connection.

== See also ==
Another variation of this story was collected as Child ballad 132, The Bold Pedlar and Robin Hood.
