= Will Scarlet =

Member of Robin Hood's Merry Men

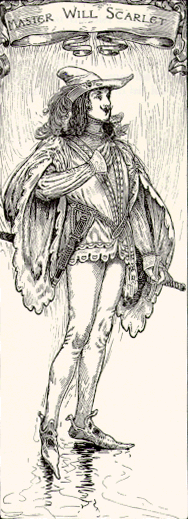
1912 depiction of Will Scarlet by Louis Rhead

Will Scarlet (also Scarlett, Scarlock, Scadlock, Scatheloke, Scathelocke and Shacklock) is a prominent member of Robin Hood's Merry Men. He is present in the earliest ballads along with Little John and Much the Miller's Son.

The confusion of surnames has led some authors to distinguish them as belonging to different characters. The Elizabethan playwright Anthony Munday featured Scarlet and Scathlocke as half-brothers in his play The Downfall of Robert, Earl of Huntington. Howard Pyle included both a Will Scathelock and a Will Scarlet in his Merry Adventures of Robin Hood. Will Stutely may also exist as a separate character because of a mistaken surname.

== Ballads ==
The first appearance of Will Scarlet was in one of the oldest surviving Robin Hood ballads, A Gest of Robyn Hode. He helps capture Richard at the Lee and when Robin lends that knight money to pay off his debts, Scarlet stands laughing at Little John for the cost of clothing the knight (Richard at the Lee) being nothing. (Child Ballad 117A p,74) But after the knight has received four hundred pounds, 3 yards of every coloured cloth, a horse and saddle Will Scarlet insists the knight should have a pair of boots.(Child Ballad 117A p,77)

Another very early ballad featuring Will Scarlet is one variant of Robin Hood's Death, in which Will's only role is to urge a bodyguard, which Robin scorns.

A later ballad, Robin Hood and the Newly Revived, ascribes an origin story to him. Robin finds a finely dressed young man shooting deer in Sherwood, and offers to let him join the band; they quarrel and fight. Robin asks who he is; he says he is Young Gamwell, who killed his father's steward and fled his father's estate to seek out his uncle, Robin Hood. Robin makes him welcome and renames him Scarlet. This story, more or less, is the common origin story for Will Scarlet, although variations occur.

Francis Child indexed those tales: A Gest of Robyn Hode as Child Ballad 117, Robin Hood's Death as Child ballad 120, and Robin Hood Newly Revived as Child ballad 128. He also listed several other ballads featuring Will Scarlet, sometimes in a very minor role. In Robin Hood's Delight (Child Ballad 136), the common story in which Robin meets a stranger, cannot outfight him, and must outwit him is altered: Robin has Little John and Will with him, and they meet three foresters, resulting in the usual fight and outwitting. In Robin Hood and the Curtal Friar (Child Ballad 123), Will Scarlet tells Robin of the friar, resulting in their encounter. In Robin Hood and Guy of Gisbourne (Child Ballad 118), Little John is captured coming to Will's rescue after two of their band had been killed and Will was fleeing. In an unusual Robin Hood ballad Robin Hood and the Prince of Aragon (Child ballad 129), Robin, Little John, and Will Scarlet come to the king's rescue, fighting the prince of the title and two giants, and ending with Will marrying the princess; this ballad, unlike the other Child ballads, is seldom used in later adaptations.

== Later versions ==
Traditionally, when the outlaws are depicted as being middle-aged, Scarlet is often depicted as young or youthful, sometimes in his late teens. In the traditional tales, he is hot-headed and tempestuous, but has a love of fine elegant clothes and is often seen wearing red silk. He is the most skilled swordsman of the merry men whilst Robin Hood is the most skilled archer and Little John the most skilled staff wielder. In some tales, Scarlet uses two swords at the same time (this was parodied in the movie Robin Hood: Men in Tights).

According to local tradition, Will Scarlet was killed after a battle with the Sheriff's men and is buried in the churchyard of the Church of St. Mary of the Purification, Blidworth in Nottinghamshire. The apex of the old church spire stands in the graveyard and is popularly referred to as a monument to Will Scarlet, whose grave is otherwise unmarked.

== Other depictions ==
- In both the 1938 film, starring Errol Flynn, and 1991 TV movie, Will Scarlet is portrayed as Robin's friend from the beginning, and is a humorous character. In the 1938 film, his given name is "Will o' Gamwell" and is played by actor Patric Knowles.
- In the 1950s series The Adventures of Robin Hood, the character was played by Ronald Howard and later by Paul Eddington. When they first met he and Robin Hood get into a fight with each other before Scarlet escapes from the Sheriff's men.
- In the UK TV series Robin of Sherwood (1984–1986), Ray Winstone portrays a different version of Will Scarlet. Rather than the merry sidekick, this interpretation is bleaker.
- In the anime series Robin Hood no Daibōken, Will Scarlet (voiced by Yuko Mita) is Robin's cousin who fights along his side when trouble arises.
- In the animated series Young Robin Hood, Will Scarlet (voiced by Sonja Ball) is a young and talented thief who idolises Robin.
- The ninety-fourth episode of Star Trek: The Next Generation, Qpid, the character of Worf (Michael Dorn) plays the role of Scarlet after the crew of the Enterprise are transformed into characters of Robin Hood.
- In Robin Hood: Prince of Thieves, Christian Slater plays Will Scarlet, whom the film depicts as the illegitimate half-brother of Robin Hood. He initially appears as a treacherous character, but later finds redemption when he helps the Merry Men rescue Maid Marian and several others from the Sheriff of Nottingham.
- In the Mel Brooks movie Robin Hood: Men in Tights, Will is shown as Little John's best friend. He is played by Matthew Porretta. In the film, his full name is Will Scarlet O’Hara, and explains that they’re from Georgia (In reference to the book and film Gone With the Wind)
- In the BBC 2006 series Robin Hood, Will Scarlet, portrayed by Harry Lloyd, is an eighteen-year-old carpenter whom Robin saves from hanging.
- In Princess of Thieves, Will Scarlet (Crispin Letts) is said to be Robin Hood's loyal friend and companion.
- In the 2010 film Robin Hood, directed by Ridley Scott, Will Scarlet is portrayed by actor Scott Grimes and is a Welsh Archer in Robin's service.
- In the 2013 TV series Once Upon a Time in Wonderland, it is revealed that one of its main characters was Will Scarlet. He is portrayed by Michael Socha. In 2014, Socha returned to the role in Once Upon a Time.
- Jamie Dornan portrayed a much more villainous version of Will "Scarlet", known as Will Tillman in the 2018 film Robin Hood. Tillman is Marian's love interest in the interim between Robin's service in the Crusades and his return. He's an aspiring politician who wishes to earn in with the Sheriff and keep Marian, but is jealous of her past love. He becomes an ally of Robin Hood and even aides Robin in attacking the Sheriff's convoy with the citizens of Nottingham but is horribly scarred by a Molotov cocktail after witnessing a kiss between the two. Will scolds Marian and is recruited by the corrupt Cardinal as the new Sheriff of Nottingham who plans to bring in Robin and his men.
- In the CG-animated series Robin Hood: Mischief in Sherwood, the character Scarlet is a female cousin of Robin Hood and is also Marian's attendant. Marian and Scarlett both spy from within the castle and provide information to the outlaws.
- Will in Scarlet was the main character of a book called "Will in Scarlet" by Matthew Cody. In this variation, Will is 13 years old and is a part of a royal family but ends up becoming part of the Merry Men after his father's castle is taken over by a Horse Knight. Robin Hood is named Rob until the near end where he names himself Robin hood.
