= Robin Hood's Delight =

Traditional song

Robin Hood's Delight (Roud 3986, Child 136) is an English folk song. It is a story in the Robin Hood canon which has survived as, among other forms, a late seventeenth-century English broadside ballad, and is one of several ballads about the medieval folk hero that form part of the Child ballad collection, which is one of the most comprehensive collections of traditional English ballads.

== Synopsis ==
One midsummer day, Robin Hood, Will Scarlock, and Little John are walking in the forest in search of diversion when they meet with three foresters clad in green and carrying faulchions and forest-bills, who challenge them. Robin asks who they are and they reply that they are keepers of King Henry's deer, but Robin doesn't believe them, claiming that he and his men are the keepers. He issues a counter-challenge that they take off their green coats and try a fight. They fight from eight o'clock in the morning until two in the afternoon, until all their breath is spent. Then Robin calls a truce that the foresters allow him to sound his horn. They refuse Robin permission, and so Robin asks them their names so that he might become friendly with them and convince them to come drink with him and his men instead of fighting. He assures the foresters that he will pay for the drink, and that they have already proven their valor and are therefore fit to join him and his men. The foresters agree, and they all go to Nottingham and bond over wine for three days.

== Historical and cultural significance ==
This ballad is part of a group of ballads about Robin Hood that in turn, like many of the popular ballads collected by Francis James Child, were in their time considered a threat to the Protestant religion. Puritan writers, like Edward Dering writing in 1572, considered such tales "'childish follye'" and "'witless devices.'"

Writing of the Robin Hood ballads after A Gest of Robyn Hode, their Victorian collector Francis Child claimed that variations on the "'Robin met with his match'" theme, such as this ballad, are "sometimes wearisome, sometimes sickening," and that "a considerable part of the Robin Hood poetry looks like char-work done for the petty press, and should be judged as such." Child had also called the Roxburghe and Pepys collections (in which some of these ballads are included) "'veritable dung-hills [...], in which only after a great deal of sickening grubbing, one finds a very moderate jewel.'"

However, as folklorist and ethnomusicologist Mary Ellen Brown has pointed out, Child's denigration of the later Robin Hood ballads is evidence of an ideological view he shared with many other scholars of his time who wanted to exclude cheap printed ballads such as these from their pedigree of the oral tradition and early literature. Child and others were reluctant to include such broadsides in their collections because they thought they "regularized the text, rather than reflecting and/or participating in tradition, which fostered multiformity."

On the other hand, the broadsides are significant in themselves as showing, as English jurist and legal scholar John Selden (1584–1654) puts it, "'how the wind sits. As take a straw and throw it up in the air; you shall see by that which way the wind is, which you shall not do by casting up a stone. More solid things do not show the complexion of the times so well as ballads and libels.'" Even though the broadsides are cultural ephemera, unlike weightier tomes, they are important because they are markers of contemporary "current events and popular trends."

It has been speculated that in his time Robin Hood represented a figure of peasant revolt, but the English medieval historian J. C. Holt has argued that the tales developed among the gentry, that he is a yeoman rather than a peasant, and that the tales do not mention peasants' complaints, such as oppressive taxes. Moreover, he does not seem to rebel against societal standards but to uphold them by being munificent, devout, and affable. Other scholars have seen the literature around Robin Hood as reflecting the interests of the common people against feudalism. The latter interpretation supports Selden's view that popular ballads provide a valuable window onto the thoughts and feelings of the common people on topical matters: for the peasantry, Robin Hood may have been a redemptive figure.

== Archival holdings ==
The English Broadside Ballad Archive at the University of California, Santa Barbara holds two seventeenth-century broadside ballad versions of this tale: one in the Pepys collection at Magdalene College at the University of Cambridge (2.112), and another in the Crawford collection at the National Library of Scotland (1162).
