= Gilbert Whitehand =

Member of Robin Hood's Merry Men

Gilbert Whitehand (also Gilbert with the White Hand) is a member of Robin Hood's Merry Men about whom next to nothing is known. It is possible that he is a character known from oral literature, with only allusions remaining in written literature.

He is present twice in A Gest of Robyn Hode, an early Robin Hood ballad from the late medieval period, where he is the only one whose archery skills match those of Robin. In the ballad he appears along with other Merry Men during the shooting match for the gold and silver arrow, and again in Barnsdale Forest during a visit by the disguised king.

It is unknown why he was referred to as having 'white hands'. It is thought that Gilbert of the Whitehand developed from Gilbert Wythehonde, a second name found in the Wakefield Court Rolls. Some have suggested it was because he had a withered hand, among other reasons. However, this is speculation and it is not specifically stated why. Gilbert clearly had no physical hindrance—it is stated that he is Robin's equal in archery, and together they were the best archers in all England.

== Other appearances ==
- Gavin Douglas mentions him alongside Robin in his Palice of Honure (1501).
- In the 1840 story Robin Hood and Little John by Pierce Egan the Younger (translated into French, divided into two parts and resumed by Alexandre Dumas, published posthumously in 1872) Gilbert and his wife Margaret are Robin's foster parents (his real father according to the Egan/Dumas storyline was the Earl of Huntingdon), and Gilbert taught Robin how to use the bow.
- In The Merry Adventures of Robin Hood (1883) by Howard Pyle, Gilbert of the White Hand appears not as one of Robin's band but as an archer of the king. In an archery contest he was the one set against Robin Hood, and although at their first shooting Robin was slightly better, a second shot was required to give Robin a clear victory.
- In The Tale of Robin Hood and His Merry Men (1905) by Elinor Mead Buckingham, Gilbert is a cook who worked for the Sheriff of Nottingham before he joined the Merry Men. He was given the name White Hands because he had lived in town for so long that his skin had not yet turned brown from exposure to the sun and weather.
- In the 1912 novel Bold Robin Hood and His Outlaw Band by Louis Rhead, Gilbert of the White Hands is a cook whose hands are whitened by flour.
- In the 1956 The Adventures of Robin Hood by Roger Lancelyn Green, Gilbert of the White Hand suffered injury to his hand as punishment for poaching deer.
- In Clayton Emery's Tales of Robin Hood (1988), Gilbert of the White Hand has a right hand withered by fire. He learned to swordfight with his left hand, which discomfits his opponents, and was knighted in the Holy Land.
