= Robin Hood Rescuing Will Stutly =

Traditional song

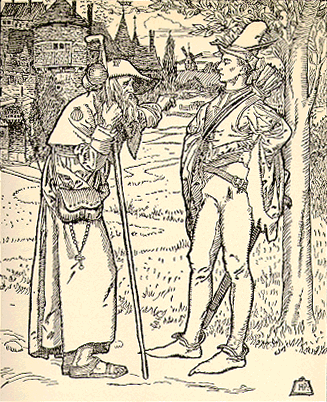
The Aged Palmer gives Young David of Doncaster news of Will Stutely in Pyle's adaption

Robin Hood Rescuing Will Stutly (Roud 3957, Child 143) is a traditional English-language folk song about Robin Hood.

== Synopsis ==
Robin Hood is brought news that the Sheriff of Nottingham surprised Will Stutely, and though he killed two of the Sheriff's men, he was captured. They set out to rescue him, confirm the story from a palmer, and arrive as he is being brought out. Will Stutly offers to fight the sheriff's men, with his bare hands, if need be, but the sheriff is resolved to hang him. Little John jumps out to cut his bonds and give him a sword. Robin's men rouse up, and the sheriff and his men flee, and Robin's men go back to Sherwood.

== Influences ==
Francis James Child believed this to be derived from Robin Hood Rescuing Three Squires.

== Adaptations ==
The entire tale was used by Howard Pyle in his Merry Adventures of Robin Hood, often with no more changes than rendering the verse as prose. An anonymous "brave young man" was identified as David of Doncaster, as part of his development of that character.
