= Robin Hood's Birth, Breeding, Valor, and Marriage =

Child ballad, Robin Hood tale

"Robin Hood's Birth, Breeding, Valor, and Marriage" (Roud 3991, Child 149) is an English folk song. It recounts Robin Hood's adventures hunting and a romance with Clorinda, the queen of the shepherdesses, a heroine who did not prove able to displace Maid Marian as his sweetheart.

In his introduction to the ballad, Francis James Child gives its first printing as 1716 in Dryden's Miscellany and remarks on the freedom with which it treats tradition and indeed common sense. A feature of interest is that the author is apparently unaware of the "Earl of Huntingdon" tradition.

== Synopsis ==
Robin Hood's father is described as a forester, out-shooting Adam Bell and his companions Clim of the Clough and William a Cloudsley, other famous outlaws of the time. Robin Hood went with his parents to his uncle's Gamwel Hall. Little John amused them there, but Robin Hood is adopted by his uncle the squire. At some later stage (apparently, the continuity isn't clear) Robin Hood set out into Sherwood with Little John. He met Clorinda, the queen of the shepherds, also out to hunt a deer. She shot one, impressing him, and he invited her to feast with him. After the meal, he asked her to marry him, and she agreed. On the way, eight yeomen tried to steal their deer. After five of them are killed, the rest spared on Little John's intercession. The marriage was celebrated. The overall tone, despite the violent episode, is relaxed and comic.
