= Robin Hood's Golden Prize =

Traditional song

Robin Hood's Golden Prize (Roud 3990, Child 147) is an English folk song. It is a story in the Robin Hood canon, which has survived as, among other forms, a late seventeenth-century English broadside ballad, and is one of several ballads about the medieval folk hero that form part of the Child ballad collection.

== Synopsis ==
Robin Hood disguises himself as a friar in the forest and encounters two "lusty" priests on horseback (4.4). He begs the priests for a silver groat, saying he hasn't been able to get anything to eat or drink all day. The priests explain that they have no money because they have been robbed that morning. Robin tells them he thinks they're lying, and at that they speed away on their horses, but Robin soon catches up with them. He pulls them off of their horses, whereupon the priests fall on their knees and promise to pray for money. After they've prayed for an hour, Robin says they will all search themselves for the money heaven has given them. The priests pretend to search themselves and still find no money, but when Robin searches them he finds five hundred pieces of gold, which he lays out on the ground. He gives them each fifty pounds for praying so earnestly and keeps the rest for himself.

Relieved to get away physically unharmed, the priests rise from their knees to go, but Robin commands them to stay until they have taken three oaths by the forest's "holy grass": that they never again will lie, that they will never try to persuade maidens to sin or lie with other men's wives, and that they will be charitable to the poor (21.3). The priests go on their way and Robin returns to the forest.

== Adaptations ==
Howard Pyle altered this to a tale about Little John in his The Merry Adventures of Robin Hood.

== See also ==
- List of the Child Ballads

== Bibliography ==
- Brown, Mary Ellen (2010). "Child's ballads and the broadside conundrum". In Patricia Fumerton; Anita Guerrini; Kris McAbee (eds.). Ballads and Broadsides in Britain, 1500–1800. Burlington, VT: Ashgate Publishing Company. pp. 57–72. ISBN 978-0-7546-6248-8.
- Child, Francis James, ed. (2003) [1888–1889]. The English and Scottish Popular Ballads. Vol. 3. Mineola, NY: Dover Publications.
- Fumerton, Patricia; Guerrini, Anita (2010). "Introduction: straws in the wind". In Patricia Fumerton; Anita Guerrini; Kris McAbee (eds.). Ballads and Broadsides in Britain, 1500–1800. Burlington, VT: Ashgate Publishing Company. pp. 1–9. ISBN 978-0-7546-6248-8.
- Holt, J. C. (1989). Robin Hood. Thames and Hudson. ISBN 0-500-27541-6.
- Singman, Jeffrey L. (1998). Robin Hood: The Shaping of the Legend. Greenwood Publishing Group. ISBN 0-313-30101-8.
- Watt, Tessa (1993). Cheap Print and Popular Piety, 1550–1640. Cambridge Studies in Early Modern British History. Cambridge University Press. ISBN 9780521458276.
