= A True Tale of Robin Hood =

Traditional song

Song
- Published: 1632
- Genre: English folk song
- Songwriter: Martin Parker

A True Tale of Robin Hood (Roud 3996, Child 154) is an English folk song, featuring Robin Hood and, indeed, presents a full account of his life, from before his becoming an outlaw, to his death. It describes him as the Earl of Huntington, which is a fairly late development in the ballads. It definitively places him in Richard the Lionhearted's reign.

This ballad was written by the prominent 17th century broadside balladist Martin Parker, and published in 1632. By Parker's own account from it was based reliable historical sources, but more probably from the abundant literary and ballad sources then available. This account includes the unusual details that Robin Hood was given to castrating monks and that he operated in Lancashire as well as Yorkshire. Unlike many of the 17th century broadsides it stresses the tradition that Robin Hood actively aided the poor.

In the ballad's narrative, Robin Hood lives well as the Earl of Huntington, but is brought to penury by his spending and the enmity of the abbot of St. Mary's. He is outlawed, and his band lives by robbing, particularly the rich clergy, but they aid the poor. He catches the abbot, who then went to the king. The king offers a reward, but his men are either out-fought, or won over by Robin's courtesy. King Richard goes to Nottingham. Robin begs a pardon by letter, and the king is agreeable. Before he gets it, however, Robin takes a fever. He trusts a friar to bleed him (a common medical practice of the day), and the friar bleeds him to death. King Richard thinks the friar treacherous, and Robin foolish to have trusted him.
