= Robin Hood and Little John =

Child ballad

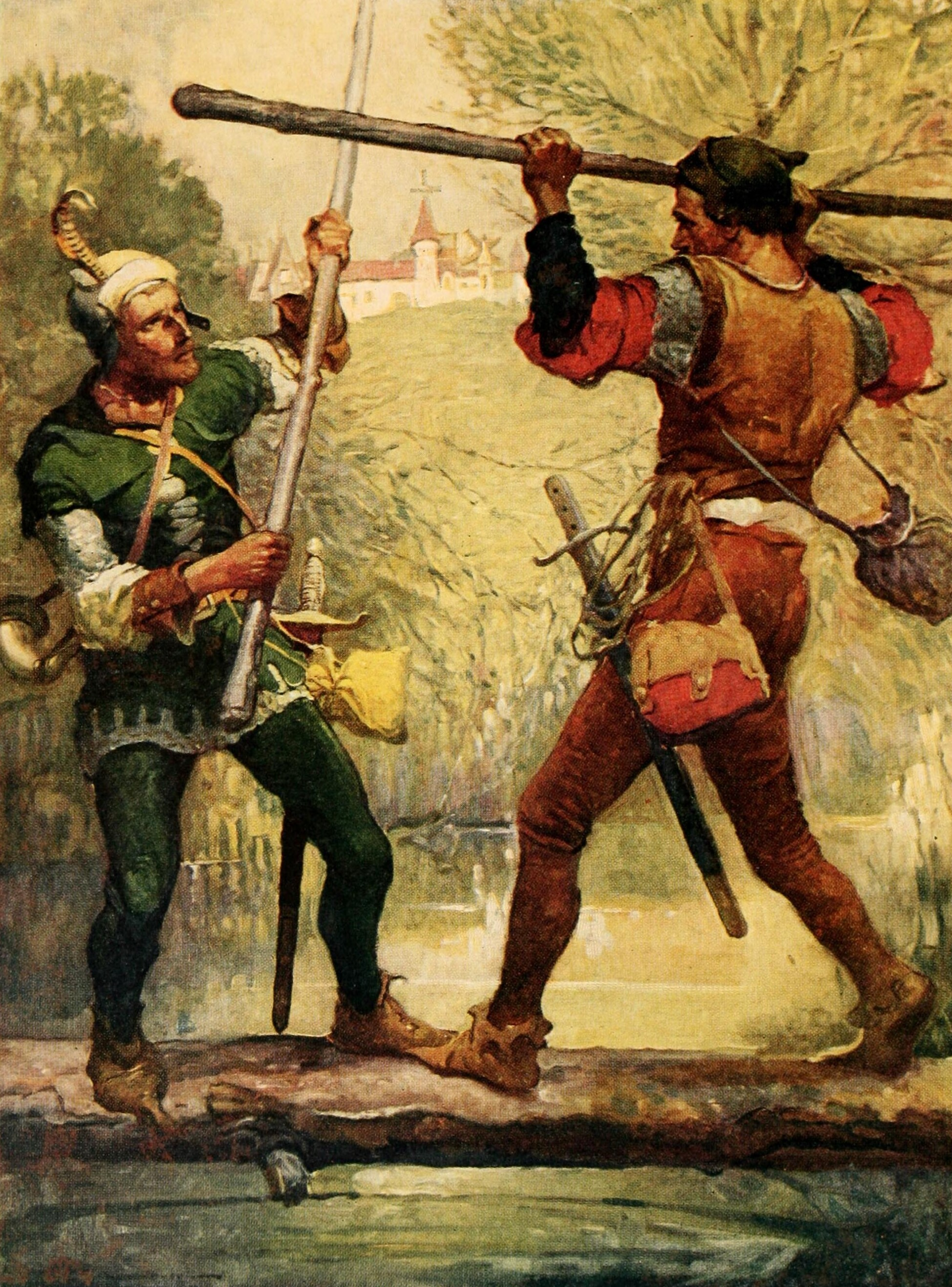
1921 illustration of Robin Hood dueling Little John

Robin Hood and Little John is Child ballad 125. It is a story in the Robin Hood canon which has survived as, among other forms, a late seventeenth-century English broadside ballad, and is one of several ballads about the medieval folk hero that form part of the Child ballad collection, which is one of the most comprehensive collections of traditional English ballads.

When Robin Hood is twenty years old he meets another brisk and fit young man named Little John. Although called "little", John is seven feet tall, large-limbed, and fearsome to behold. This is the story of how they met: Robin is out and about with his men and leaves them on call to rove the forest on his own in search of "[s]port" (5.1). In his roving, Robin meets a stranger on a bridge over a brook who won't give way. They challenge each other with their respective weapons, and the stranger remarks it's unfair that Robin has a bow and arrows while he has only a staff, so Robin agrees to take up a staff for the fight. He goes to a thicket and chooses a thick oaken staff, then runs back to the bridge where they agree to fight with their staffs until one of them falls off. They fight as viciously as if they were thrashing corn, neither willing to give in and Robin becoming especially incensed when the stranger cracks him on the crown hard enough to draw blood. The stranger responds to Robin's ire even more powerfully and sends him into the brook, whereupon Robin agrees to call a truce.

As soon as Robin is out of the brook, he blows on his horn to summon his men. The men come and one of them named William Stutely asks why Robin is all wet and he says it is because he has been thrown into the brook by the stranger on the bridge. The men want to punish the stranger, but Robin holds them back, saying he can join his band and learn how to shoot a bow and arrow. The stranger agrees and reveals himself as John Little. William Stutely decides to be Little John's "Godfather", and the men celebrate their new comrade by shooting some fat doe for their meat, changing John Little's name by switching his Christian name and surname in a "Baptismal" ceremony, and then gorging on meat and drink (30.2). Little John is also dressed in green like the other merry men and given a long bow. Robin says he will learn to shoot with the best and will roam the forest with him and his men, owning no land or money, because whatever they need they can steal from the clergy passing through. The men finish the day with music and dancing and then retreat to their caves, Little John now among them.

== Historical and cultural significance ==
This ballad is part of a group of ballads about Robin Hood that in turn, like many of the popular ballads collected by Francis James Child, were in their time considered a threat to the Protestant religion. Puritan writers, like Edward Dering writing in 1572, considered such tales "'childish follye'" and "'witless devices.'" Writing of the Robin Hood ballads after A Gest of Robyn Hode, their Victorian collector Francis Child claimed that variations on the "'Robin met with his match'" theme, such as this ballad, are "sometimes wearisome, sometimes sickening", and that "a considerable part of the Robin Hood poetry looks like char-work done for the petty press, and should be judged as such." Child had also called the Roxburghe and Pepys collections (in which some of these ballads are included) "'veritable dung-hills ..., in which only after a great deal of sickening grubbing, one finds a very moderate jewel.'" However, as folklorist and ethnomusicologist Mary Ellen Brown has pointed out, Child's denigration of the later Robin Hood ballads is evidence of an ideological view he shared with many other scholars of his time who wanted to exclude cheap printed ballads such as these from their pedigree of the oral tradition and early literature. Child and others were reluctant to include such broadsides in their collections because they thought they "regularized the text, rather than reflecting and/or participating in tradition, which fostered multiformity." On the other hand, the broadsides are significant in themselves as showing, as English jurist and legal scholar John Selden (1584–1654) puts it, "'how the wind sits. As take a straw and throw it up in the air; you shall see by that which way the wind is, which you shall not do by casting up a stone. More solid things do not show the complexion of the times so well as ballads and libels.'" Even though the broadsides are cultural ephemera, unlike weightier tomes, they are important because they are markers of contemporary "current events and popular trends." It has been speculated that in his time Robin Hood represented a figure of peasant revolt, but the English medieval historian J.C. Holt has argued that the tales developed among the gentry, that he is a yeoman rather than a peasant, and that the tales do not mention peasants' complaints, such as oppressive taxes. Moreover, he does not seem to rebel against societal standards but to uphold them by being munificent, devout, and affable. Other scholars have seen the literature around Robin Hood as reflecting the interests of the common people against feudalism. The latter interpretation supports Selden's view that popular ballads provide a valuable window onto the thoughts and feelings of the common people on topical matters: for the peasantry, Robin Hood may have been a redemptive figure.

== Library and archival holdings ==
The English Broadside Ballad Archive at the University of California, Santa Barbara holds two seventeenth-century broadside ballad versions of this tale: a copy in the Roxburghe ballad collection at the British Library (3.728-729) and another held in the Crawford collection at the National Library of Scotland (1320).

== Adaptations ==
Howard Pyle adapted many tales about Robin Hood, Little John, and other characters of the legend in his The Merry Adventures of Robin Hood. The fight between Robin Hood and Little John on the bridge is also frequently portrayed in film and television versions of the legend.
