= The Jolly Pinder of Wakefield =

Early English ballad

"The Jolly Pinder of Wakefield" (Roud 3981, Child 124) is an English-language folk song about Robin Hood. The oldest manuscript of this English broadside ballad, according to the University of Rochester, dates back to 1557, and a fragment of the ballad appears also in the Percy Folio. Copies of the ballad can be found at the National Library of Scotland, the British Library, and Magdalene College. Online editions of the ballad are also available.

== Synopsis ==
This broadside ballad, opens with a pinder, a townsman in charge of impounding stray animals, exclaiming that no one will dare trespass on Wakefield under his watchful eye. The pinder's boasts are overheard by Robin and his merry men, who—as they approach the pinder—are promptly turned away and asked to leave. A scuffle between the pinder and Robin and his merry band ensues, with the pinder getting the better of Robin and his company. Robin Hood, impressed by the pinder's physical prowess in battle and his desire to protect those who cannot protect themselves, offers the pinder a place in his group. The ballad concludes with the pinder promising that after Michaelmas he will join Robin and his band.
