= Robin Hood and the Curtal Friar =

Child ballad, Robin Hood tale

"Robin Hood and the Curtal Friar" (Roud 1621, Child 123) is an English-language folk song about Robin Hood first meeting Friar Tuck.

This ballad appears in earlier and later versions, the earlier one appearing in damaged form in the Percy Folio. As with Robin Hood and Guy of Gisborne the story also appears in May Day plays and there is good reason to think that it goes back to at least the fifteenth century.

== Curtal ==
The word curtal is used only when referring to the friar. It could mean "a shorter gown, worn for mobility" or indicate that he had been a gardener.

== Plot ==
The outlaws have a good hunt. Robin Hood says there is no match for Little John within a hundred miles; Will Scadlock tells him that a friar at Fountains Abbey can. Robin sets out to see this monk. He finds him by a riverside and forces the monk to carry him over, except that the friar throws him in halfway across. They battle until Robin asks a favor: to let him blow on his horn. When the friar agrees, Robin's men appear, with bows in hand. The friar asks a favor: to let him whistle. When Robin agrees, many fierce dogs appear. In the later version, Little John shoots twenty of them, and the Friar agrees to make peace with Robin. In the earlier version, Robin Hood good-humoredly refuses further combat; in both earlier and later versions Robin invites him to join the band.

== Adaptions ==
Howard Pyle used this tale in his The Merry Adventures of Robin Hood as part of the tale of Alan-a-Dale: Robin needed a priest who would perform the wedding ceremony in defiance of authority, and Will Scarlet proposed Friar Tuck.

== Thirteen months ==
The Percy Folio version of the ballad begins with the stanza:

But how many merry monthes be in the yeere?
There are thirteen, I say;
The midsummer moone is the merryest of all,
Next to the merry month of May.

Robert Graves in his English and Scottish Ballads used this stanza to support his argument for pagan survivals in the Robin Hood legend, and for the popular survival of a supposedly pagan thirteen-month calendar.
