= The Bold Pedlar and Robin Hood =

Traditional song

The Bold Pedlar and Robin Hood (Child 132, Roud 333) is an English folk song, forming part of the Robin Hood canon.

== Synopsis ==
A pedlar meets Robin Hood and Little John, and Little John asks what he has in his pack. Little John demands half of it. They fight. The pedlar winning, Robin laughs and says he has a man who could defeat him. They fight, and the pedlar wins again, and refuses to hold his hand, or tell his name, until they had told them theirs. They do, and he says his name is Gamble Gold, and he is fleeing because he killed a man in his father's lands. Robin identifies him as his mother's sister's son, and they go to the tavern and drink together.

A version of this song was recorded by Ed McCurdy in the mid-1950s on Elektra Records' Folk Sampler. In this version the pedlar identifies himself as "Gambolling Gold of the gay green woods".

Barry Dransfield recorded a version on his eponymous 1972 album, called "Robin Hood and the Peddlar". This album is one of the rarest folk albums, hugely sought after by collectors.

A version of the song entitled "Gamble Gold (Robin Hood)" was recorded on the 1975 Steeleye Span album All Around My Hat. There is also a ballad on the subject.

== See also ==
The bold pedlar may make another appearance in the earlier Robyn and Gandeleyn.

The song features in the game Assassin's Creed 4: Black Flag.
