= Robin Hood and the Ranger =

Traditional song

Robin Hood and the Ranger (Roud 933, Child 131) is an English-language folk song.

== Synopsis ==
Robin Hood, going out to hunt deer, meets a forester who forbids him. They fight. Robin is beaten, and blows his horn, summoning his men. He offers to make him one of their company, and they hold a feast.
