= Robin Hood and the Scotchman =

Traditional song

Robin Hood and the Scotchman (Roud 3984, Child 130) is an English folk song, part of the Robin Hood canon.

== Synopsis ==
Robin Hood goes north and meets with a Scot, who wishes to enter his service. Robin refuses, because the Scot will prove false. A fight ensues. One variant is truncated at this point, but the other ends with the man entering his service.
