= Much the Miller's Son =

Companion of Robin Hood

Much, the Miller's Son is one of the Merry Men in the tales of Robin Hood. He appears in some of the oldest ballads, A Gest of Robyn Hode and Robin Hood and the Monk, as one of the company.

== History ==
In A Gest of Robyn Hode, he helps capture Richard at the Lee, and when Robin lends that knight money to pay off his debts, he is one of the Merry Men who insist on giving him a horse and clothing appropriate to his station. In Robin Hood and the Monk, he is one of the rescuers of the captive Robin. In this brutal ballad, Moche kills a page boy so the boy cannot bear word that the outlaws killed the monk of the title. He then disguises himself as the page and Little John disguises himself as the monk. The implication that Much is of small stature is not made explicit.

In other tales, he was known as Midge, the Miller's Son, the name by which he is known in Robin Hood and the Curtal Friar and Robin Hood and Queen Katherine (version 145B). It is also the name used by Howard Pyle for the character in his Merry Adventures of Robin Hood. This is in further contrast to the ballad Robin Hood and Allan-a-Dale where he is known as Nick, the Miller's Son.

== Appearances in other media ==
Much plays a notable role in the 1938 film The Adventures of Robin Hood, played by Herbert Mundin. After nearly being executed for poaching, he is rescued by Robin Hood, and soon joins up with the Merry Men. Much helps to recruit men to join their band. Later using information relayed to him by Lady Marian's nursemaid, Bess, he warns the Merry Men that Prince John intends to locate and kill King Richard before the rest of England can learn of his return.

Much is the main character in a Xeric award-winning webcomic, Much the Miller's Son by Steve LeCouilliard. This comedy series loosely follows the legend of Robin Hood (drawing heavily from the Errol Flynn version) from the point of view of Much.

=== BBC series ===
Much is also a major character in the BBC television series Robin Hood (2006–2009), but he is no longer a miller's son; in the second episode, he claims to have no family at all. Instead, he is Robin's former manservant, comrade-in-arms, and best friend from the Third Crusade, who has been given his freedom as a result of his services there, but finds himself outlawed with Robin upon their return home. In this version, he is the gang's cook and immensely loyal to Robin; he is often seen to be jealous of the attention Robin gives to others, especially Marian. In the series, Much was played by Sam Troughton, grandson of Patrick Troughton, the first actor to play Robin Hood on British television.

The role of Much as a cook has some literary precedent in J. Walker McSpadden's Stories of Robin Hood and His Merry Outlaws (1904). In this collection of Robin Hood tales, Much (who is still the son of a miller) is living in the household of the Sheriff of Nottingham and serving as his cook until he meets Robin and Little John and joins the Merry Men. He is portrayed as a "stout man and bold" and a highly skilled swordsman.
