= Little John =

Companion of Robin Hood

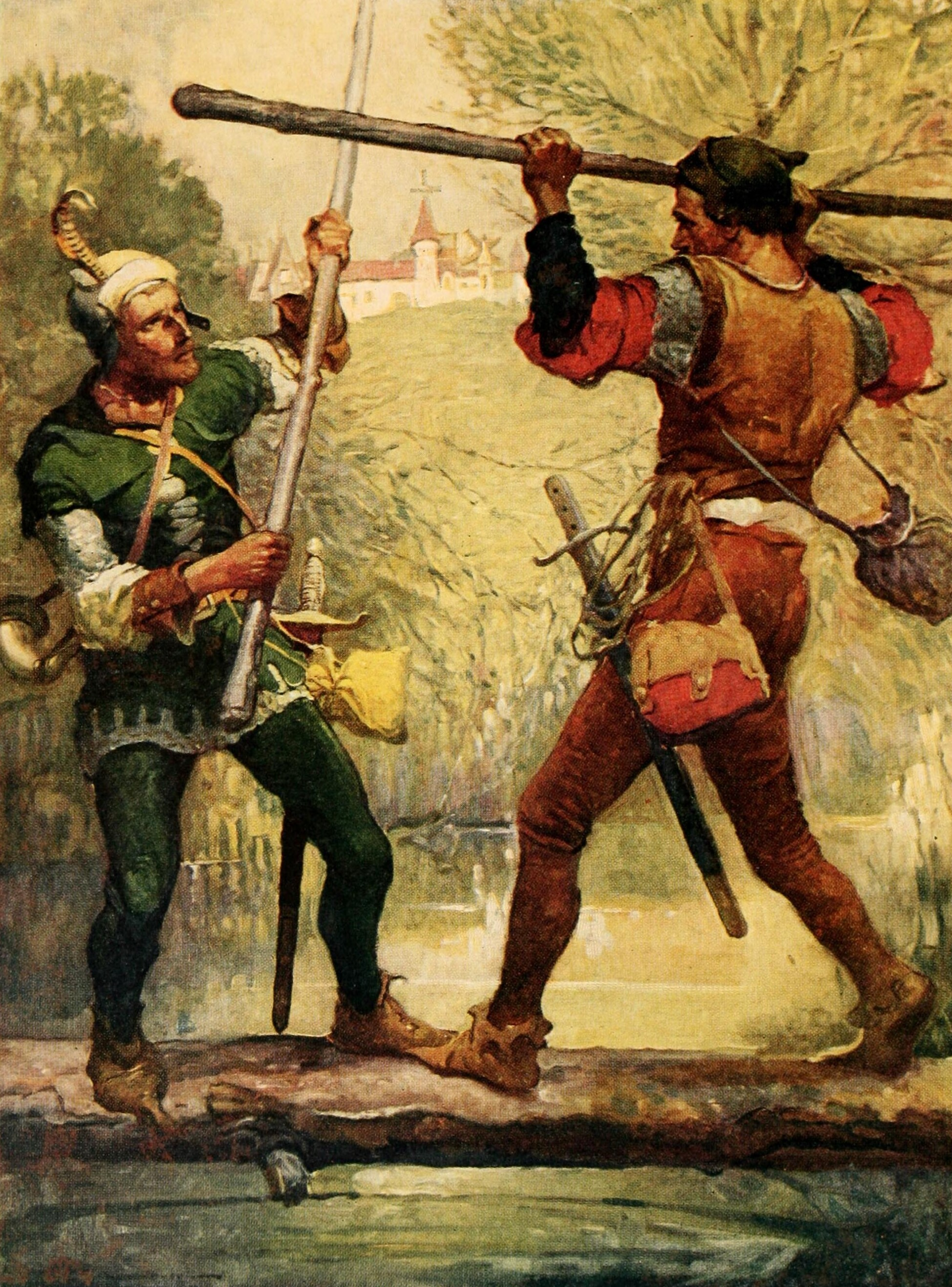
- 1921 illustration of Little John (right) dueling Robin Hood
- Born: Yorkshire
- Died: Hathersage, Derbyshire
- Other name: Reynold Greenlefe
- Known for: Companion of Robin Hood

Little John is a companion of Robin Hood who serves as his chief lieutenant and second-in-command of the Merry Men. He is one of only a handful of consistently named characters who relate to Robin Hood and one of the two oldest Merry Men, alongside Much the Miller's Son. His name is an ironic reference to his giant frame, as he is usually portrayed in legend as a huge warrior – a 7-foot-tall (2.1-metre) master of the quarterstaff. In folklore, he fought Robin Hood on a tree bridge across a river on their first meeting.

== Folklore ==
The first known reference in English verse to Robin Hood is found in The Vision of Piers Plowman, written by William Langland in the second part of the 14th century. Little John appears in the earliest recorded Robin Hood ballads and stories, and in one of the earliest references to Robin Hood by Andrew of Wyntoun in 1420 and by Walter Bower in 1440. In the early tales, Little John is shown to be intelligent and highly capable. In "A Gest of Robyn Hode", he captures the sorrowful knight and, when Robin Hood decides to pay the knight's mortgage for him, accompanies him as a servant. In "Robin Hood's Death", he is the only one of the Merry Men that Robin takes with him. In the 15th-century ballad commonly called "Robin Hood and the Monk", Little John leaves in anger after a dispute with Robin. When Robin Hood is captured, it is Little John who plans his leader's rescue. In thanks, Robin offers Little John leadership of the band, but John refuses. Later depictions of Little John portray him as less cunning.

The earliest ballads do not feature an origin story for this character. According to a 17th-century ballad, he was at least seven feet tall and introduced when he tried to prevent Robin from crossing a narrow bridge, whereupon they fought with quarterstaves, and Robin was overcome. Despite having won the duel, John agreed to join his band and fight alongside him. From then on he was called Little John in whimsical reference to his size. This scene is almost always re-enacted in film and television versions of the story. In some modern film versions, Little John loses the duel to Robin.

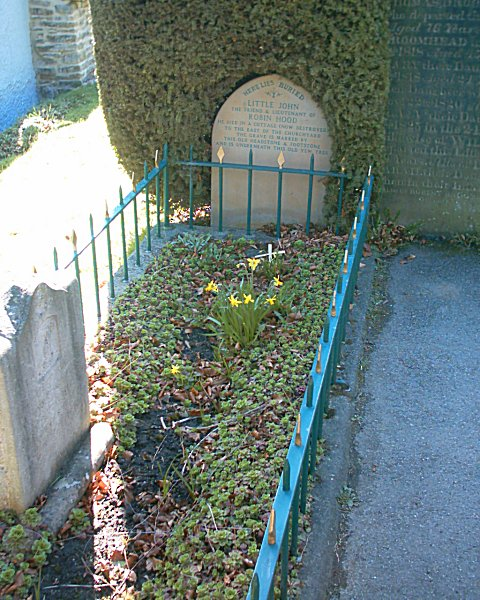
Little John's grave in St Michael's Church graveyard, Hathersage

Starting from the ballad tradition, Little John is commonly shown to be the only Merry Man present at Robin Hood's death.

Despite a lack of historical evidence for his existence, Little John is reputed to be buried in a churchyard in the village of Hathersage, Derbyshire. A modern tombstone marks the supposed location of his grave, which lies under an old yew tree. This grave was owned by the Nailor (Naylor) family, and sometimes some variation of "Nailer" is given as John's surname. In other versions of the legends, his name is given as John Little, losing the irony of his nickname.

According to local legend, Little John built himself a small cottage across the River Derwent from the family home. The site now has a 15th century Grade II listed ex-farmhouse and barn built on it, called Nether House at Offerton.

In Dublin, a local legend suggests that Little John visited the city in the 12th century and was hanged there.

== Film and television ==
Alan Hale, Sr. played the role of Little John in three movies. He first played Little John as a young squire in 1922's Robin Hood starring Douglas Fairbanks. He reprised the role opposite Errol Flynn's Robin in 1938's The Adventures of Robin Hood. And finally, he played an older Little John opposite John Derek, as Robin's son, in Rogues of Sherwood Forest from 1951.

Other notable film and TV Little Johns include Archie Duncan in the 1950s TV series, Nicol Williamson in Robin and Marian, James Robertson Justice in the 1952 Disney film The Story of Robin Hood and His Merrie Men, Clive Mantle in the 1980s TV series Robin of Sherwood, Bin Shimada as the voice of Little John in the anime series Robin Hood no Daibōken, Terrence Scammell as the voice of Little John in the animated series Young Robin Hood, Phil Harris as the voice of Little John the Bear in the 1973 Disney animated film Robin Hood, David Morrissey in Robin Hood and Nick Brimble in Robin Hood: Prince of Thieves – both in 1991, and Eric Allan Kramer in 1993's Robin Hood: Men in Tights.

Kevin Durand plays John in 2010's Robin Hood. In this incarnation, he is a Scottish foot soldier in the Crusades who fights Robin over a lost bet, claiming he was cheating, then joins Robin, Will, and Alan when the king is killed.

In the BBC's Robin Hood, Little John was played by Gordon Kennedy. John meets Robin when his band of outlaws steals from Robin's band. John also has a wife, Alice, and a son, both of whom believe he is dead until late in the first series. He dislikes Robin immediately but has a change of heart after Robin makes a stand to protect John's wife and son. When the sheriff attempts to interrogate the villagers of Loxley on Robin's whereabouts by cutting out their tongues, Robin surrenders just as they are threatening Alice, thus sparing her. While Robin is awaiting execution, John discreetly meets his son, who mentions how Robin helped him and his mother, and the rest of the village by feeding them all. This causes John to lead the others to Nottingham Castle to rescue Robin, after which John and Robin become good friends. John is the oldest of the outlaws and fights with a quarterstaff.

He was portrayed by Jason Burkart in the TV series Once Upon a Time and its spin-off Once Upon a Time in Wonderland.

Jamie Foxx portrayed John in the 2018 movie Robin Hood. In contrast to most versions of John, this version is officially known as 'Yahya'—which he says translates to 'John'—and is originally Muslim fighting against Robin when they meet in battle during the Crusades, with this first encounter resulting in Yahya's left hand being cut off. However, when he sees Robin try to save his son from being executed by Sir Gisborne, he stows away on a ship taking Robin back to England with the goal of helping Robin take up an opposing role to the Crusades. Despite the loss of his left hand making it impossible for him to use a bow, he is still a skilled enough fighter to intercept Robin's arrows with only his staff and soon adapts to the use of his metal-clad stump as another weapon in combat.

Little John, also going under the alias "Edward" is played by Bill Skarsgard in the A24 movie The Death of Robin Hood, released in 2026.

In the British television show Fact or Fiction, episode 4, hosted by Tony Robinson, it is postulated that "Little John" is in actuality Reynolde Greenleaf from near Beverley in the East Riding of Yorkshire.

== Analysis ==
Little John has been argued to play a crucial role in illustrating the ties between the servant and the master, and his actions can be seen as challenging the power hierarchy of the depicted society.

== Bibliography ==
- Holt, JC (1982), Robin Hood, Thames & Hudson, ISBN 0-500-27541-6.
