= A Gest of Robyn Hode =

Middle English ballad

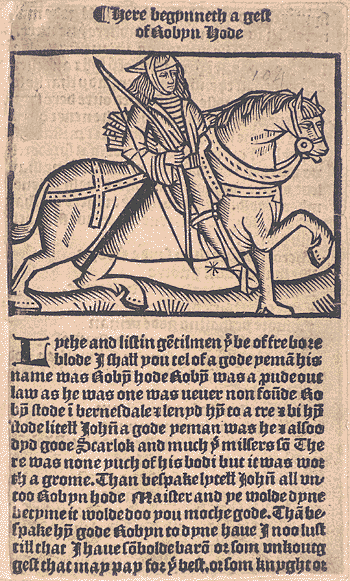
Illustrated first page from c. 16th-century print edition. Now housed at the Library of Scotland

A Gest of Robyn Hode (also known as A Lyttell Geste of Robyn Hode) is one of the earliest surviving texts of the Robin Hood tales. Written in late Middle English poetic verse, it is an early example of an English language ballad, in which the verses are grouped in quatrains with an ABCB rhyme scheme, also known as ballad stanzas. Gest, which means "tale" or "adventure", is a compilation of various Robin Hood tales, arranged as a sequence of adventures involving the yeoman outlaws Robin Hood and Little John, the poor knight Sir Richard at the Lee, the greedy abbot of St. Mary's Abbey, the villainous Sheriff of Nottingham, and King Edward of England. The work survives in printed editions from the early 16th century, only some 30 years after the first printing press was brought to England. Its popularity is proven by the fact that portions of more than ten 16th- and 17th-century printed editions have been preserved. While the oldest surviving copies are from the early 16th century, many scholars believe that based on the style of writing, the work likely dates to the 15th century, perhaps even as early as 1400. The story itself is set somewhere from 1272 to 1483, during the reign of a King Edward; this contrasts with later works, which generally placed Robin Hood earlier in 1189–1216, during the reigns of Richard I of England and John, King of England.

Due to its length, popularity, and influence, A Gest of Robyn Hode is one of the fundamental building blocks of the Robin Hood tradition, and English outlaw literature in general. It established many of the most common motifs and characterizations seen in the legend. While it is not the oldest surviving work, it is the longest and most complete of the surviving early texts at 456 stanzas and 1,824 lines; the other oldest stories such as Robin Hood and the Monk are much shorter. Influential motifs seen in this story include Robin being a "Good Outlaw" who commits crimes, but while keeping to a strict moral code; Little John as Robin's loyal right-hand man; Robin being deeply devoted to the Virgin Mary as his personal patron saint; Robin helping the less fortunate while taking ironic punishment on the powerful and corrupt, including both the Sheriff and high-ranking church members; an archery contest that Robin wins; Robin's awkward relationship with the king, where he is ultimately loyal to the crown yet still an outlaw at heart; and Robin's death occurring only as a result of treachery and betrayal.

== Summary ==
A Gest of Robyn Hood is divided into eight fyttes (sections) that tell interleaving stories of Robin and his band. Jess Bessinger Jr divided Gest into four tales based on the characters that feature in them, each with several episodes, although the beginning and end of a tale or episode does not always align with the fyttes. Bessinger's divisions are as follows:

1. Robin Hood, Knight, and Abbot (Tale A: Fytte 1, 2, and 4)
2. Robin Hood, Little John, Sheriff, and Knight (Tale B: Fytte 3, 5, and 6)
3. Robin Hood, Knight, and King (Tale C: Fytte 7 and the first half of 8)
4. Death of Robin Hood (Tale D: The second half of fytte 8)

Quotes from the text have been given with modern spelling.

=== First Fytte ===
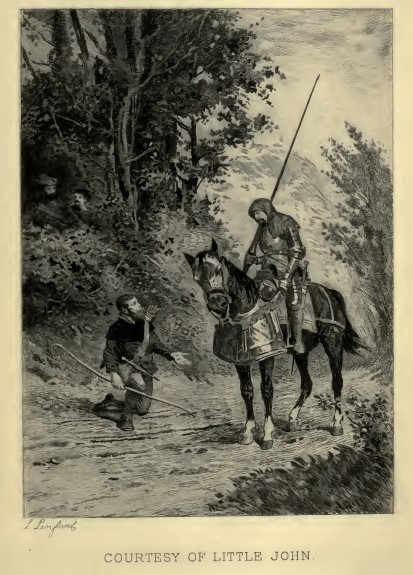
Engraving from 1887 edition of Ritson's Robin Hood.

Robin Hood, a good yeoman and courteous outlaw, has heard 3 masses this morning: one to honour God the Father; one to honour the Holy Ghost; and one to honour the Virgin Mary, for whom he has a deep devotion. He has fasted since midnight, and Little John, also a good yeoman, suggests he should eat soon. Robin declines to dine without a guest to pay for the feast. He sends his men to find one and reminds them to do no harm to farmers, yeomen or gentlemen, but to rob bishops, archbishops and the Sheriff of Nottingham should they encounter them. Little John, Much the Miller's son and William Scarlock leave to search for a guest.

They see a knight on horseback in a back street in Barnsdale. He looks forlorn, slouched over in his saddle, his face careworn and streaked with tears. Little John approaches the Sorrowful Knight, genuflects, and welcomes him to the forest, saying his Master Robin Hood is waiting dinner for him. The Knight remarks "He is good yeoman ... /Of him I have heard much good." The Knight leaves with the outlaws.

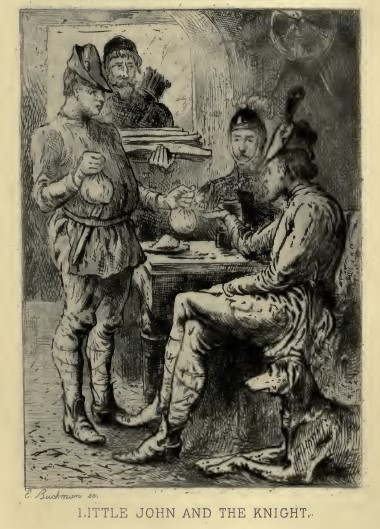
Robin Hood, Little John and the Knight in the huntsman's hut. Engraving from 1887 edition of Ritson's Robin Hood.

When Robin Hood sees the Sorrowful Knight, he pushes back his hood, and genuflects to him. They all wash, and sit down to a fine feast. They enjoy plenty of bread and wine, along with deer sweatbreads, pheasants, swans, and other river birds. The Knight remarks that he had not had such a dinner for weeks, and should he pass through this way again, he would return the favour. Robin retorts that the Knight should pay before he leaves, as it is not proper for a yeoman to pay for a knight's feast. The Sorrowful Knight says he has only 10 shillings, and is embarrassed to offer such a small amount. Little John checks his baggage, and verifies the Sorrowful Knight is truthful.

Robin remarks on the Sorrowful Knight's threadbare clothing, and inquires about his situation. The Sorrowful Knight responds that his ancestors have been knights for 100 years but now he is disgraced, because his son and heir killed a knight of Lancaster. To redeem him, the Sorrowful Knight borrowed 400 pounds from the Rich Abbot of St Mary's, using his lands as collateral. The loan is now due, but he has only 10 shillings, so his lands will be seized by the Abbot. Robin asks if he had any friends. The Knight replies that he had plenty when he was rich, but none that he is poor. Robin then asks if he has anybody who could offer collateral. The Knight replied that he had none "But if it be Our dear Lady;/She failed me never or this day." Robin, who has a deep devotion to the Virgin Mary, declares that she is the best collateral in all of England. He instructs Little John to fetch 400 pounds from their treasure chest, and pay the Knight. Emboldened by Robin's words, Little John suggests new livery in Robin's colours of scarlet and green, and a new horse. Robin offers a grey courser with a new saddle; after all, he says, the Knight is the Virgin Mary's messenger. Much suggests a good palfrey, Scarlock suggests new boots, and Little John suggests shining spurs. Robin adds that a knight can not ride alone, and offers Little John as a companion. "In a yeoman's stead he may thee stand,/If thou great need have."

=== Second Fytte ===
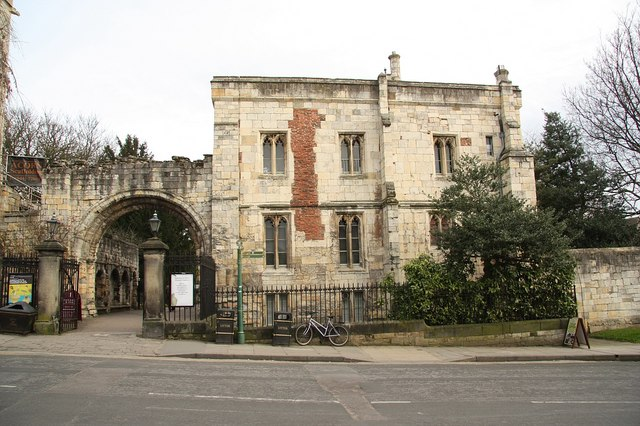
The Gate Lodge at St Mary's Abbey, York

The scene switches to York, where the monks of St Mary's Abbey are sitting down to dinner. The Abbot, the Prior, the Chief Steward, the Sheriff of Yorkshire, and the county Justice are discussing the Knight whose debt of 400 pounds is due today. The Prior observes that if it was him, he would pay 100 pounds now and the rest later. The Abbot remarks that the Knight is suffering hunger and cold while serving England's cause overseas. The Prior admonishes the Abbot that, in that case, it would pitiful to take his land; but such a grievous wrong would not bother the Abbot's conscience at all. The Abbot snaps back at the Prior, telling him he's always getting in the way. The "fat-headed"[line 363] Chief Steward suggests that the Knight is either dead or hanged. The county Justice offers his opinion that the Knight will not come. They are all disappointed when the Knight appears at the gate.

The Knight genuflects and salutes them all "great and small". Upset at the Knight's appearance in the Abbey hall, the Abbot skips the customary courtesies and demands if he brought the Abbot's money. Not one penny, the Knight calmly replies. The Abbot snaps back, then why are you here? The Knight answers that he is here to beg for more time. The county Justice sharply interrupts, your time is up and your land is forfeit. Still on one knee, the Knight begs the Justice to "be my frende". The Justice responds that he can not; he is working on retainer from the Abbot. The Knight then looks to the Sheriff, who also refuses to aid the Knight. Finally the Knight offers his services as the Abbot's Knight until the debt is paid. The Abbot rebukes the Knight's offer. "'Out,' he said, 'thou false knight,/Speed thee out of my hall!'" The Knight calls the Abbot a liar, and stands up.

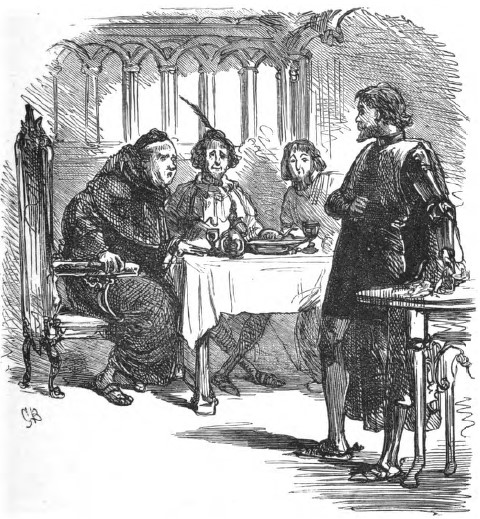
The Knight approaches the Abbot to pay his debt. Engraving from 1884 edition of Ritson's Robin Hood.

As the Knight approaches, the Justice asks the Abbot how much would he give the Knight to purchase the land outright. 100 pounds is the Abbot's reply; make it 200, insists the Justice. The Knight strides to the Abbot's table, and shakes Robin's 400 pounds out of the bag and onto the table. The Abbot is stunned. He tells the Justice to take the money as an additional retainer. The Justice refuses. The Knight then announces to everyone in the hall that he has paid his debt; his land is his once more. The Knight leaves, now carefree. He travels home with a light heart, singing. His worried wife meets him at the gate to Wyresdale. Be happy, my wife, says the Knight, and pray for Robin Hood; without his kindness, we would be beggars now.

Over the next year the Knight accumulates the 400 pounds to repay Robin Hood. He also purchases 100 bows, 100 bundles of arrows, 100 horses, and hires 100 men clothed in red and white clothing. On the day his debt is due, the Knight and his men head for Barnesdale. At Wentbridge, they pass a fair where a stranger has won the wrestling match. The yeoman is in danger of being killed by the crowd. Remembering how Robin treated him, he orders his company to surround the yeoman, shouting that no harm would befall him. He purchases a cask of wine and breaks it open so that all may drink. But the Knight and his company stay until the fair is done to ensure the yeoman's safety. In the meantime, Robin Hood is waiting under the tree in the greenwood.

=== Third Fytte ===
It is now autumn. Little John is still the Knight's Yeoman, and joins other young men in longbow target practice. Three times Little John shoots; three times he "split the wand". The Sheriff of Nottingham is impressed. He approaches Little John, asking his name and birthplace. Little John replies, Reynold Greenleaf of Holderness. The Sheriff then asks Little John to work for him. Only if the Sheriff obtains a leave of absence from the Knight, Little John advises. The Knight agrees, and Little John rides off on one of the Sheriff's good strong horses.

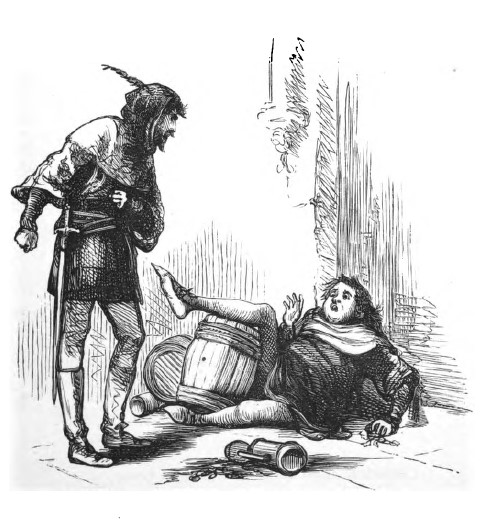
Little John beats up the Butler. Engraving from 1884 edition of Ritson's Robin Hood.

One day the Sheriff goes hunting and leaves Little John behind. It is now past noon, and Little John has not eaten. Little John asks the steward for dinner, but is told not until the Sheriff comes home. Little John then threatens the butler, and gives him a strong blow to his back. The butler runs to the pantry and shuts the door. Little John kicks the door open and drinks more than his share of the ale and wine.

The Sheriff's Cook, a bold stout man, confronts Little John. The Cook delivers three strong blows to Little John, who vows that he won't leave until he pays the Cook back. They both draw swords and fight for an hour, with neither gaining the advantage. Little John acknowledges that the Cook is the best swordsman he has ever seen; if he is as good with the bow, the Cook could join with Robin Hood. The Cook agrees. Little John and the Cook sit down to a fine dinner. Then they break the lock on the Sheriff's treasury and steal all the silver dinnerware plus 300 pounds in coin. They leave immediately to meet Robin Hood.

After they greet each other, Robin Hood inquires as who is "that fair yeoman" accompanying Little John, and what is the news from Nottingham. Little John responds that the proud Sheriff sends his greetings, his Cook, his silver tableware, and 300 pounds in coin. Robin replies sarcastically that it wasn't because of the Sheriff's generosity. Little John has a sudden thought to trick the Sheriff. He runs 5 miles to meet the Sheriff, hunting with his hounds. Where have you been, demands the Sheriff. In this forest, replies Little John, I have seen a green hart, with a herd of 140 deer. The Sheriff exclaims, that would be a sight to see! Then quickly follow me, says Little John. When they meet Robin and his 140 men, Little John announces that here is the master hart and his herd of deer! The Sheriff is amazed by how Little John has betrayed him. It's your fault, says Little John, I never got my dinner at your place.

The Sheriff sits down to dinner, and is horrified when he realizes he is eating from his own silver tableware. Robin says, consider it charity, and for Little John's sake, I grant you your life. When dinner was done, Robin tells Little John to strip the Sheriff of his fur-lined mantle and all his fine clothes, and wrap him in a green mantle. Robin then orders the Sheriff's men to do likewise, and lie down next to the Sheriff. All night they lie on the cold ground in only their breeches, shirts, and the green mantles. The next morning, the Sheriff complains about his stiff muscles. Don't complain, replies Robin, this is how we live; he continues, for the next year, I will teach you how to live as an outlaw. The Sheriff grumbles, not for all the gold in England. He pleads with Robin to let him go. Robin demands that he swear an oath on Robin's sword that he will never again harm Robin or any of his men. The Sheriff swears his oath, and leaves the greenwood.

=== Fourth Fytte ===
It is now one year later. The scene is Robin Hood and Little John in the greenwood. Little John suggests that it is time for dinner, but Robin declines. He fears the Virgin Mary is angry with him, since the Knight has not yet arrived. Little John consoles him, saying that the sun has not yet set, and the Knight is true to his word. Robin instructs Little John to take Much and William Scarlok, and search for an "unknown guest"[line 835]. Irritated, Little John takes up his bow and his sword to do Robin's bidding.

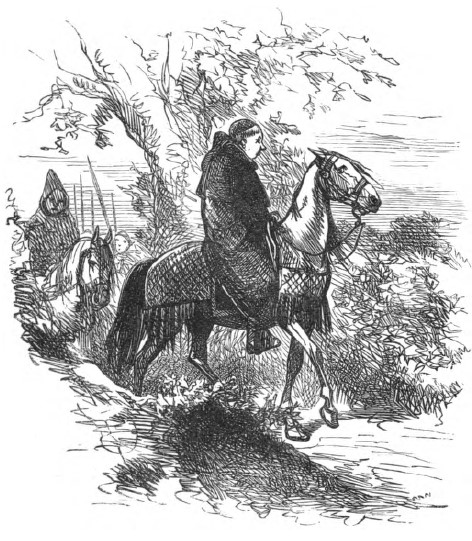
The Monk of St Mary's in Barnesdale Forest. Engraving from 1884 edition of Ritson's Robin Hood.

On the highway in Barnesdale they spot a monk on a good palfrey. Little John remarks to Much, here is our pay. The monk is being escorted by 52 men and seven pack horses. Little John tells his companions to prepare for an ambush. He aims his arrow at the monk, ordering him to stop where he is. Calling him a churlish monk, Little John accuses the Monk of angering his master, Robin Hood. ""He is a strong thief," said the monk,/"Of him heard I never good."". Much lets fly an arrow which barely misses the Monk's chest, and he quickly dismounts. All the attendants turn and flee, leaving only a little page and a groom with the pack horses.

Little John brings the Monk to the huntsman's hut. Robin Hood lowers his hood, but the uncourteous Monk does not. Robin asks Little John how many men the monk had. 52 men, is his answer. Blow the horn, orders Robin. 140 men, dressed in striped scarlet, answer the call to run down the Monk's attendants. Robin & Little John force the Monk to wash up for dinner, and they serve him at the table. While he is eating, Robin asks the Monk, to which abbey do you belong & what office do you hold. I am the Chief Steward of St Mary's Abbey, answers the Monk.

Robin Hood is still worried that the Virgin Mary is angry with him, since the Knight has not yet appeared. Little John tells Robin not to worry, the Monk has brought the money; he is from her abbey. Robin is not consoled. She was my collateral for a loan I made to the Knight, he says. Speaking to the Monk, Robin asks to see the silver - if he brought it. The Monk swears at Robin, saying he knows nothing of this loan. Robin Hood retorts: God is righteous, and so is the Virgin Mary, you are to blame; you are her servant, and her messenger. How much money do you carry, Robin Hood demands of the Monk. 20 marks of silver, he replies. Robin orders Little John to check the Monk's baggage.

After laying out the contents of the Monk's purse, Little John hurries back to Robin Hood. The Virgin Mary has doubled your money, he declares. Robin is elated. They all drink to her honour. Curious at what is in the packhorses, Robin again asks Little John to search again. The Monk protests strenuously, mounts his horse, and rides off.

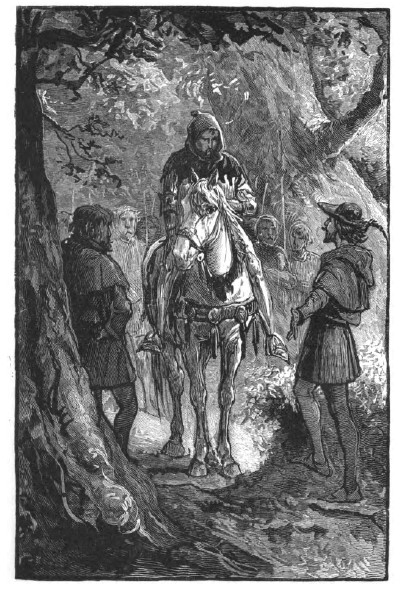
The Poor Knight meets Robin Hood. Engraving from 1884 edition of Ritson's Robin Hood.

It is still daylight when the Knight rides into Barnesdale, and sees Robin Hood standing under the greenwood tree. The Knight dismounts, lowers his hood, and genuflects to Robin. Robin warmly welcomes him, and asks why he is so late. The Knight replies that he stopped to help a poor yeoman in trouble. In that case, rejoins Robin, for helping a good yeoman, I am your friend. The Knight offers the 400 pounds, and 20 marks more for Robin's courtesy. He refuses, saying the money was already delivered by the Monk of St Mary's. But the bows and arrows I brought are a poor payment, says the Knight. Robin sends Little John to retrieve 400 pounds of the Monk's money, and then hands it to the Knight. Buy a horse and a good harness, he says, get some new clothing. And he adds, if ever you need spending money, come see me.

=== Fifth Fytte ===
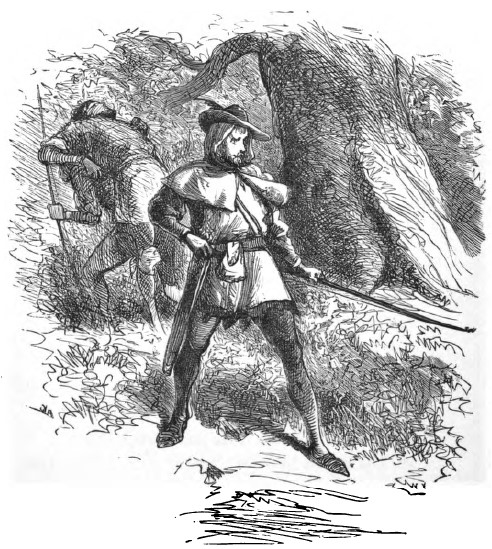
Much carries a wounded Little John away from Nottingham. Engraving from 1884 edition of Ritson's Robin Hood.

The Sheriff of Nottingham announces an archery contest for all the best archers of the North. The prize will be an arrow with a head and feathers of red gold, and a shaft of white silver. Upon hearing of the contest, Robin Hood calls his fellowship together. He orders that only six of his men shoot with him; the rest, with arrows nocked, are to keep watch on the Sheriff's men.

Three times Robin shoots, and three times he splits the wand. But so did good Gilberte with the White Hand. The two shoot again, but Robin is best, and wins the prize. The outlaws begin their return to the greenwood, but the fair-goers shout and blow horns. The Sheriff's men loose a hail of arrows, and Robin shouts curses at the Sheriff for breaking his pledge. Many of the fellowship are wounded, including Little John, who took an arrow to his knee. Little John begs Robin not to let the Sheriff take him alive - he tells Robin to inflict mortal wounds to his head. Robin replies, not for all the gold in England! God forbid that you should die, cries Much, and hefts Little John onto his back.

Not far away is the castle of Sir Richard at the Lee, the Sorrowful Knight. Immediately Sir Richard takes in Robin and his men. He orders the gates be shut, the bridge be drawn up, and the walls manned.

=== Sixth Fytte ===
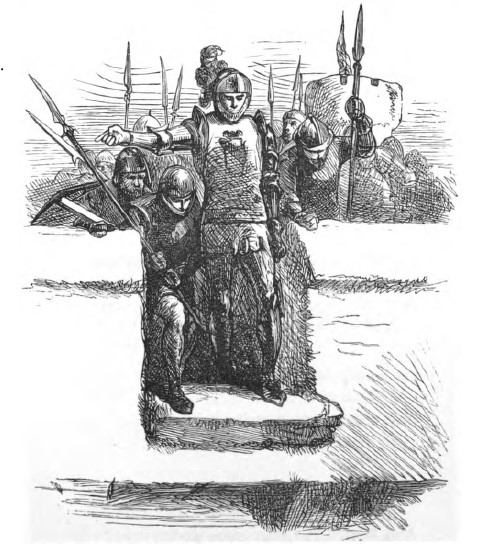
Sir Richard defends his castle against the Sheriff of Nottingham. Engraving from 1884 edition of Ritson's Robin Hood.

The High Sheriff of Nottingham raises a large army from around the countryside to besiege Sir Richard's castle. “Traitorous Knight!” the proud Sheriff shouts to Sir Richard. “You harbor the King's enemy against the law.” The Knight courteously agrees that he is doing so. Sir Richard adds, “Tell our King what has happened, and see what he says.”

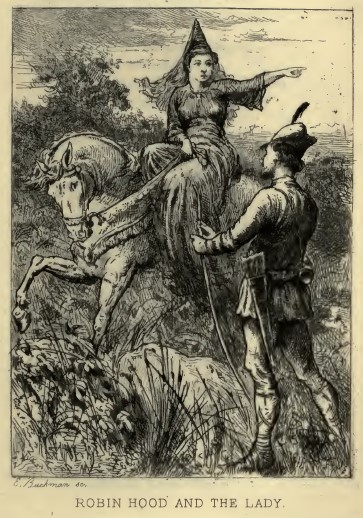
Robin Hood and the Knight's Lady. Engraving from 1887 edition of Ritson's Robin Hood.

The Sheriff rides to London, and tells the King that Sir Richard is supporting the outlaw band. Furthermore, he tells the King, Sir Richard is using the outlaws to set himself up as lord of the north land. The King said he would be in Nottingham in two weeks, and that the Sheriff is to gather more archers from all over the countryside. In the meantime, Robin Hood returns to the greenwood, where Little John later joins him after his knee heals.

Having missed his chance to capture Robin, the Sheriff lies in wait to capture Sir Richard instead. He finally overcomes the gentle Knight as he is hawking by the river, and takes him to Nottingham. When Sir Richard's wife is told what has happened, she rides out to the greenwood to find Robin. For Our dear Lady's sake, she implores Robin, don't let my husband be killed for supporting you. Who took your lord, asks Robin. The Sheriff, she replies, and they are not more than three miles from here. Robin quickly gathers his men and they run towards Nottingham.

The fellowship catches up with the Sheriff. Robin stops the Sheriff, asking about the news from the King. Robin then quickly draws his bow, and lets loose an arrow that knocks the Sheriff off his horse. Before the Sheriff can rise, Robin beheads him with his sword. Lie there, proud Sheriff, taunts Robin, no man could trust you while you were alive.

The rest of the fellowship attack the Sheriff's men and cut them down. Robin leaps to Sir Richard's side, cuts his bonds, and hands him a bow. Come to the greenwood with me, Robin orders, until I can get us "... grace/Of Edward, our comely king."

=== Seventh Fytte ===
The King arrives at Nottingham and asks about Robin Hood and Sir Richard. Hearing what has happened, he seizes the Knight's lands, and searches for Robin throughout Lancashire. Reaching Plompton Park, he notices that there are far fewer deer than usual. Cursing Robin Hood, the King orders Robin to be brought before him, and that anyone who brings him the head of Sir Richard would receive his lands. Then an old knight advises, as long as Robin Hood lives, no man will hold Sir Richard's lands. Six months later, one of the King's royal foresters approaches the King, suggesting a subterfuge to catch Robin. You and five men should dress as monks, he said, and I will lead you into the forest; then you will meet Robin Hood. The King wears a broad abbot's hat to conceal his face, and goes into the forest.

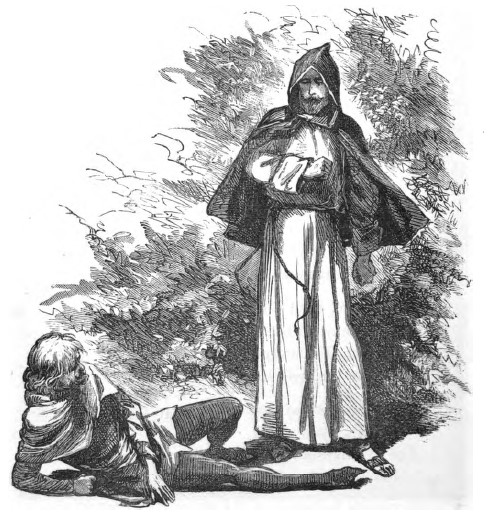
Robin Hood is felled by the disguised King. Engraving from 1884 edition of Ritson's Robin Hood.

They soon meet Robin, standing in the road along with many of his men. Robin Hood grabs the reins of the King's horse. Sir Abbot, Robin addresses the disguised King, we are but poor yeomen of the forest who live by the King's deer, share with us some of your wealth as an act of charity. The disguised King replies he has only 40 pounds, having spent much during the last two weeks entertaining the King and his lords. If I had 100 pounds, he continues, I would give you half. Robin takes the 40 pounds, counts out 20 pounds, and returns 20 pounds to the disguised King. Our great king bids you come to Nottingham, says the disguised King, and shows Robin the royal seal. Robin immediately genuflects as he says, "I love no man in all the world/ So well as I do my king;/ Welcome is my lord's seal;" In honour of the King, Robin invites the disguised King to dinner. Robin blows his horn to assemble the fellowship, who genuflect around him. The disguised King is surprised, realizing that Robin's men are more willing to answer his call than the royal men are to answer the King's call. Quickly the feast is prepared, with Robin and Little John waiting on the disguised King themselves. The disguised King is treated to fat venison, white bread, red wine, and ale.

After dinner, Robin arranges an archery demonstration. The disguised King remarks that the targets were too far away. Robin orders, anyone who misses the target would forfeit his arrows and endure a slap on his face from me. Twice Robin shoots, and twice he splits the wand. On the third attempt, Robin misses, and his men taunt him. Robin approaches the disguised King, offers his arrows, and says he is ready for his slap. The disguised King declines, saying it is against the rules of his order. Do it, declares Robin. The disguised King rolls up his sleeve and deals a resounding slap that knocks Robin to the ground. The disguised King bends over to help Robin up, and as he does so, Robin looks intently into the King's face. Noticing Robin's reaction, Sir Richard does the same. Then both of them genuflect to their King. Robin asks mercy for his men, which the King grants. The King then invites Robin to join Edward's royal court. Only if I can bring my men with me, replies Robin.

=== Eighth Fytte ===
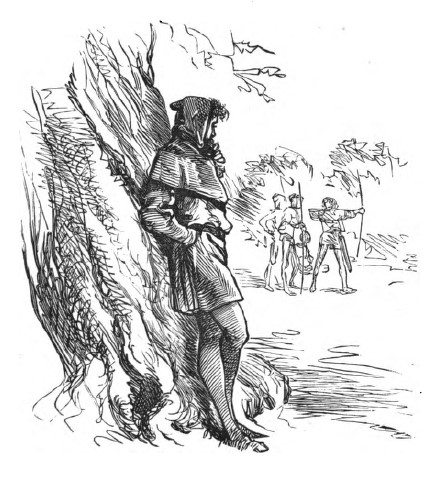
Homesick Robin Hood at the King's court. Engraving from 1884 edition of Ritson's Robin Hood.

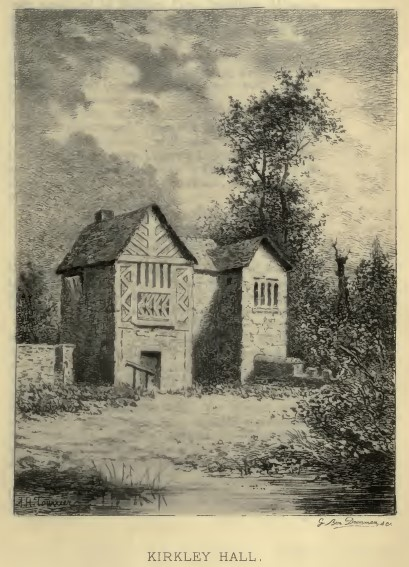
Engraving from 1887 edition of Ritson's Robin Hood.

In the first section, the King asks if Robin has any green cloth so he and his men can exchange their black cowls for ones of Lincoln green. Back to Nottingham, the King commands. With feasting, drinking, and singing, the King welcomes Robin and his men into his service, and restores Sir Richard's lands.

Robin and his men spend the next year in the royal court. Robin has spent all his wealth, as well as the money meant for his men. Now only Little John and Scathelock remain. One day, while watching some young men at target practice, he becomes homesick. Robin asks the King for leave to make a pilgrimage to his chapel of Mary Magdalene in Barnsdale. The King grants him seven days.

When he reaches the greenwood with the birds merrily singing. He shoots a hart, and blows his horn. All the outlaws in the forest recognize Robin's horn and come running. They push back their hoods and genuflect, welcoming Robin back. There he remains for twenty-two years.

Years later, Robin has a kinswoman who was Prioress of Kirkley. She and her lover, Sir Roger of Doncaster, are plotting to kill Robin. The Prioress is skilled in the art of blood-letting, and lets Robin slowly bleed to death when he comes to Kirkley for treatment. The tale ends with a prayer: "Christ have mercy on his soul,/.../For he was a good outlaw,/And did poor men much good."

== Geography ==
Remnants of Barnsdale Forest

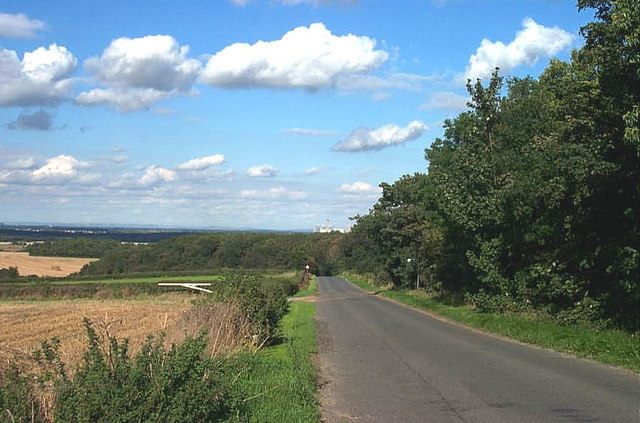
Barnsdale Wood

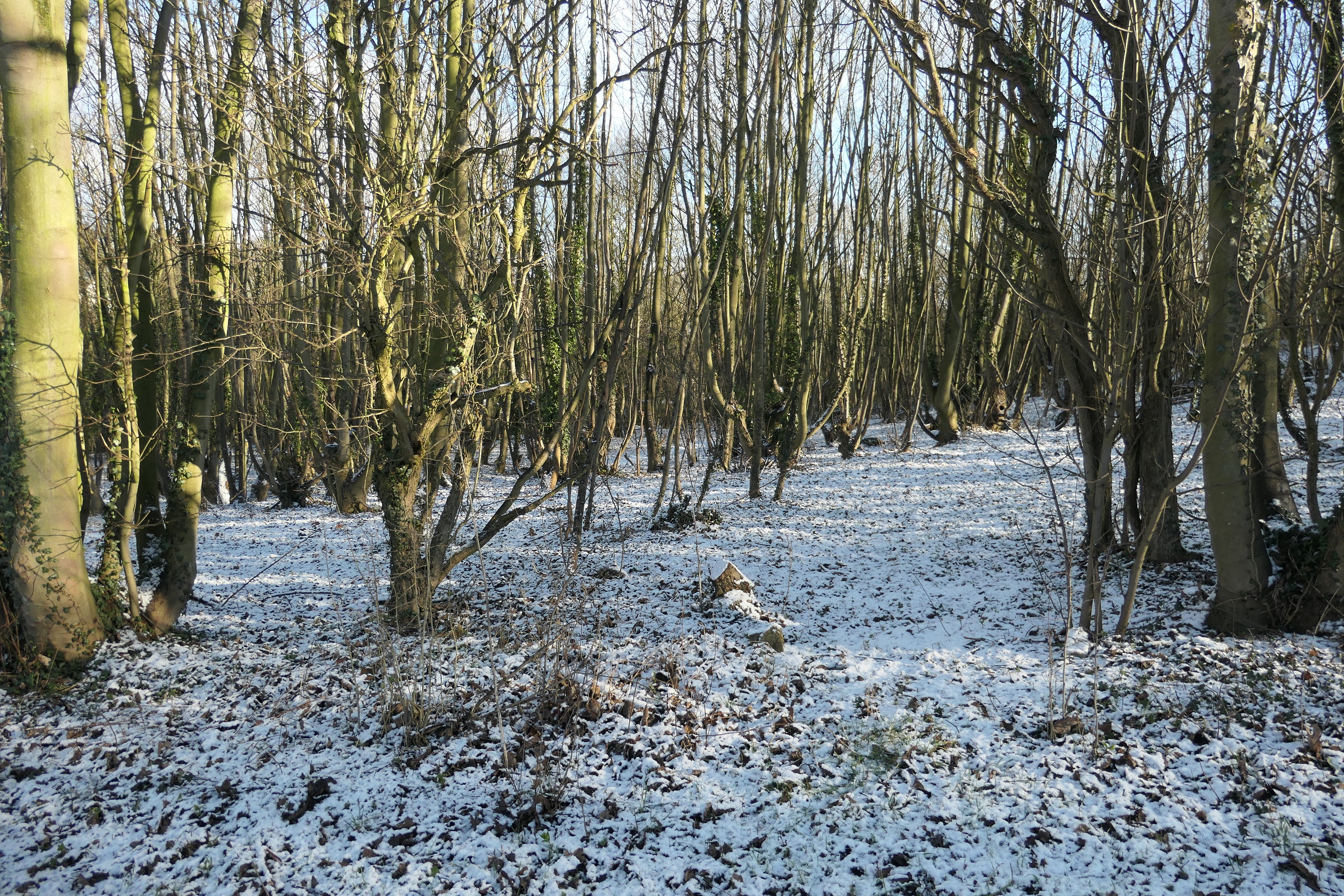
Hanging Wood

The place names mentioned in Gest locate Robin Hood in the West Riding of Yorkshire: Blyth; Doncaster; St Mary Magdalene Church at Campsall; and Kirklees Abbey. The cities of York, Lancaster, and Nottingham, as well as the Knight's castle at Wyresdale, are also mentioned. This area is famous for its wide river valleys, and the eastern foothills of the South Pennines, with its numerous limestone caves where outlaws could hide. The greenwood of Barnsdale Forest is Robin's home; "Robyn stood in Barnesdale/And leaned him to a tree," is how the tale of the Sorrowful Knight opens.

== Earliest texts ==
A Gest of Robin Hode is considered as one of the three oldest Robin Hood tales. The other two are Robin Hood and the Monk (Child 119) and Robin Hood and the Potter (Child 121). Both of these latter tales survive as manuscripts dated to the second half of the 15th century; however, there are no surviving manuscripts of Gest. The earliest text fragments for Gest are from about a dozen printed editions dated to the 16th and 17th centuries. To identify the most important editions, Child labeled them as a through g. Texts a through e are referred to as the early texts, and texts f and g are called the later texts. Of interest to linguists and historians is that the later texts replaced some of the obsolete words of the early texts in order to make Gest more understandable to the audiences of the time. Since Child's time, more editions have been identified by researchers.

John Maddicott has remarked on the lack of variation between the two earliest texts: text a and text b. He interpreted this lack of variation to a standard work being available prior to the printed editions.

=== text a ===
also known as the Antwerp edition
Entitled A Gest of Robyn Hode; it has no printer's name, location, or date.

Also known as the Lettersnijder edition, it is attributed to Jan van Doesbroch in Antwerp c. 1510. Although it contains only about 200 of the total 456 quatrains, it is considered the most authentic version of the text, due to the linguistic archaisms in the text. It is housed at the National Library of Scotland.

Text a is part of an eleven-text volume known as the Chapman and Myllar prints. However, only nine texts in the volume were actually printed by Chapman and Myllar. Text a was one of the two texts which were not. According to the National Library of Scotland, the volume was presented to the Advocates Library at some time before August 1788 by John Alston of Glasgow. The binding was not sturdy, being made of parchment, which explains why so many pages of text a are lost. (Text a being the last work in the volume.) At some time between 1798 and 1808, the volume was rebound in London by Charles Hering.

The page illustration shown at the top of this article shows the first page of text a. The woodcut is almost identical to the Yeoman woodcut in Richard Pynson's edition of The Canterbury Tales. However, the typesetter did not leave enough room for the woodcut, had to reset the first one-and-a-half pages, and resorted to using abbreviations and run-on sentences to make everything fit.

=== text b ===
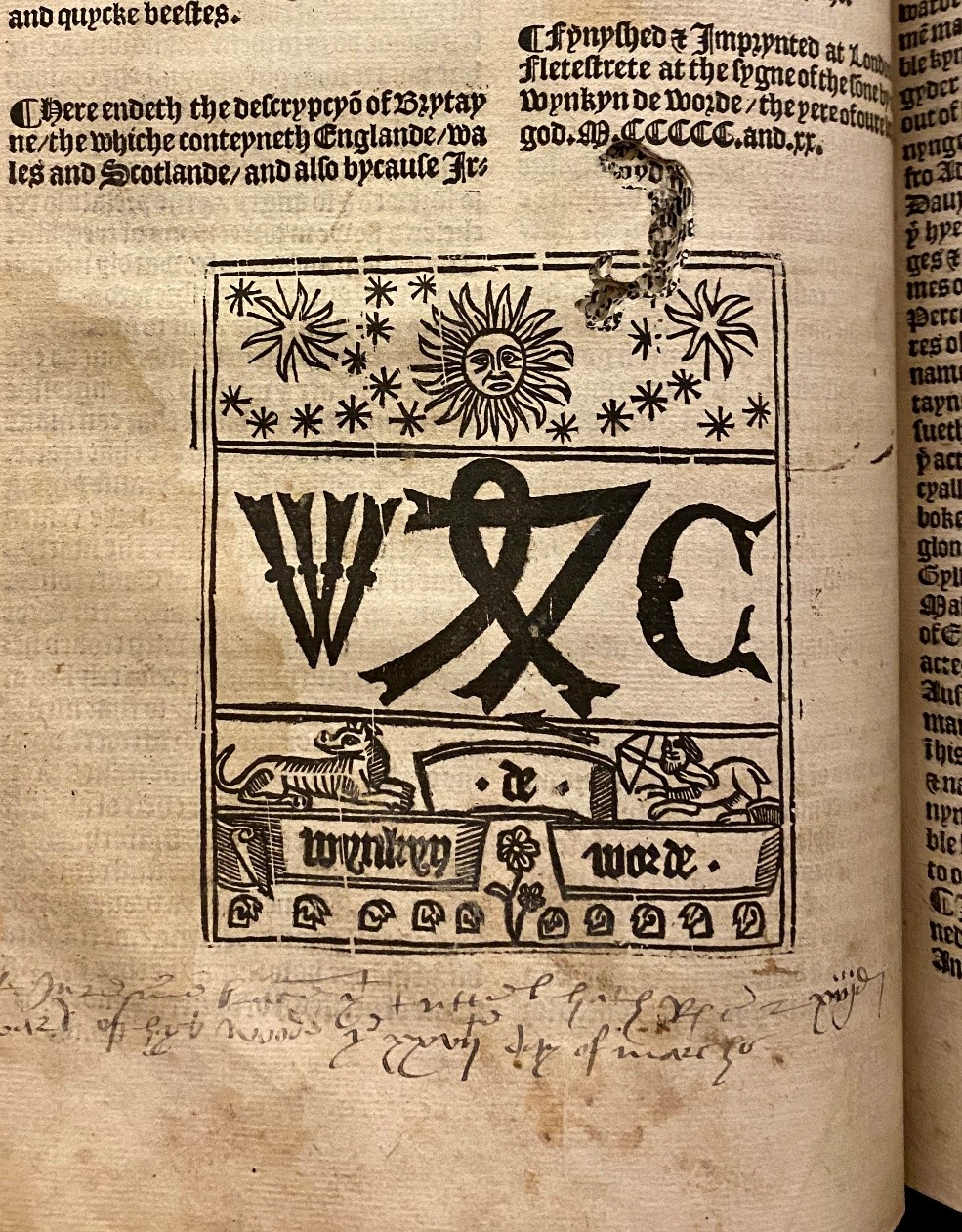
Wynkyn de Worde printer device (before c. 1520)

also known as the de Worde edition, c. 1493–1518
Entitled A Lytell Geste of Robyn Hode; it was printed by Wynken de Worde in London.

This edition is nearly complete, and may be older than text a. It was used as the base text by Ritson and Gutch. Modern scholars, such as Child, Dobson and Taylor, Knight, and Ohlgren consider it to contain more errors, so they use text a and filled in from text b. It is housed at Cambridge University Library.

The edition's date is determined from the type fonts used, and the printer's device on the last page.

=== texts c through e (Douce Fragments) ===
Individual pages which are in poor condition. They are housed at the Bodleian Library.

=== text f (Copeland edition) ===
Entitled A Mery Geste of Robyn Hoode. It was printed in London by William Copeland no earlier than 1548. It is housed at the British Museum.

=== text g (White edition) ===
Entitled A Merry Gest of Robin Hood. It was printed in London for Edward White, and is undated. It is housed at the Bodleian Library.

=== Pynson's edition (c. 1495–1500) ===
Entitled A Lytell Geste. This edition survives as three sets of fragments:

- text c (Douce Fragment)
- single leaf fragment, now housed at Cambridge University Library
- two leaves now housed at the Folger Shakespeare Library

=== Hugo Goes edition ===
Entitled A Lytell Geste and printed in York sometime prior to 1509. The only surviving leaf is one of the Douce Fragments (e.12). Hugo Goes worked with one of de Worde's assistants, Henry Watson. When de Worde moved his business to Fleet Street after 1500, Goes acquired some of his fonts before moving to York to start his own business.

=== Julian Notary edition (c. 1515) ===
Entitled A Lytell Geste. The surviving fragments are four imperfect leaves attached to paper binding strips (Douce fragment f.1). The attribution to Notary is confirmed by the size and style of the type fonts; he was the only London printer to use 92 mm.

=== Copeland edition (c. 1565) ===
A single leaf fragment of waste print used as spine support for a volume printed in London by John Wolfe in 1584.

Based upon the type font, the printing is attributed to Copeland. The date is estimated from the language differences from his 1560 edition. It is housed at the Codrington Library, All Souls College, Oxford.

=== White edition (copy of the Bodleian Library edition) ===
Entitled A Merry Iest of Robin Hood, and printed in London for Edward White, bookseller, c. 1594. The printer is thought to have been Edward Allde. Anthony Munday, author of the Robin Hood plays, was apprenticed to Allde. The text is closely based upon William Copeland's edition, however, the spelling was updated and punctuation was introduced. It is housed at the Chaplin Library, Williams College, Williamstown, Massachusetts.

== Literary analysis ==
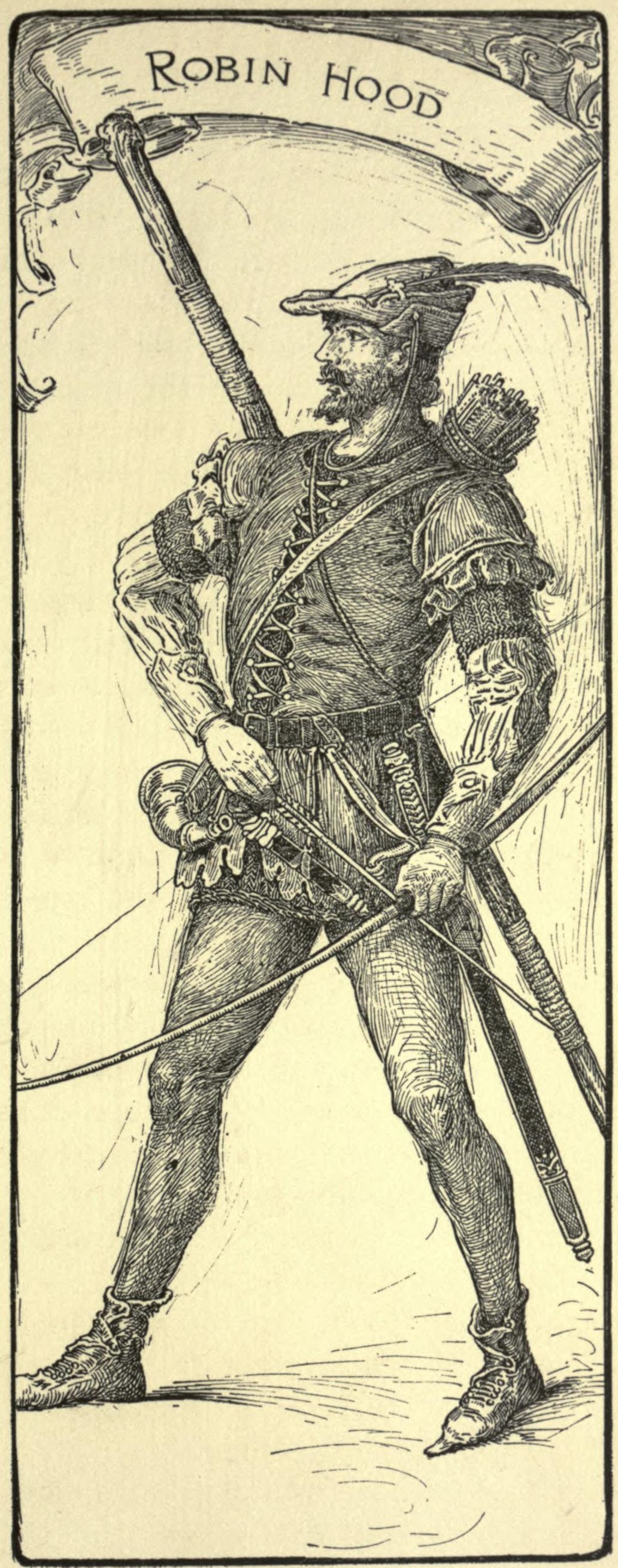
An iconic pose of Robin Hood, as illustrated by Louis Rhead

Gest was studied by William Hall Clawson in 1909. Clawson was a student of F. J. Child's successor, George Lyman Kittredge, and his dissertation on Gest expanded on Child's introduction. In 1968, medievalist D. C. Fowler published A Literary History of the Popular Ballad. Fowler was one of the first to advocate the study of the English and Scottish ballads relative to their historical time and place, rather than simply within the classification of the Child anthology. In 1974, J. B. Bessinger Jr attempted to extend Clawson and incorporate Fowler's proposal that Gest was a product of 15th-century minstrels. One of Bessinger's contributions was a narrative schematic that refined Child's "3-ply web" into three tales of nine episodes distributed among eight fyttes.

In 1984, Douglas Gray, the first J. R. R. Tolkien Professor of English Literature and Language at the University of Oxford, considered the Robin Hood and Scottish Border ballads more as oral poems. He objected to the then-current definitions of a ballad as some ideal form, whose characteristics were distilled from the Child Ballads. When compared to "this notion of a 'pure ballad', the Robin Hood poems seem messy and anormalous", he contended. Therefore, he titled his article The Robin Hood Poems, and not The Robin Hood Ballads.

However, Gray admitted that the Robin Hood tales, like most popular literature, are sometimes regarded as "sub-literary material", containing formulaic language and a "thin texture", especially "when they are read on the printed page". Additionally, he argued, that since Child had grouped all the Robin Hood 'ballads' together, some literary studies had "rashly based themselves on all the Robin Hood ballads in the collection", instead of discarding those of dubious value. J. R. Maddicott also recognized this issue, and argued that since so little is known about the origins of the ballads from the available early manuscripts and printed texts, internal evidence has to be used.) Gray further contended that, as oral poetry, each poem should be judged as a performance. He agreed with Ruth Finnegan in considering the performance as "integral to the identity of the poem as actually realized". In an oral performance, a skillful raconteur can draw his audience in, making them part of his performance; hence no two oral performances are identical. Gray points out that one of the characteristics of Gest are scenes with rapid dialogue or conversations, in which the formulaic diction, limited vocabulary, and stereotyped expressions are artfully used to express emotion. Such scenes lying dully on a page can spring into action when recited by one or two talented minstrels.

=== The Gest poet ===
Gest is a compilation of many early Robin Hood tales, either in verse or prose, but most of them now lost. They were woven together into a single narrative poem by an unknown poet. F. C. Child, arguing that there was only one poet, described the Gest poet as "a thoroughly congenial spirit." W. H. Clawson considered him "to have been exceedingly skillful", while J. B. Bessinger declared him as "original and transitional"[p 43]. Gray thought the weaving to have "been neatly done". J. C. Holt implied that there were two poets: the original poet who compiled the First, Second, and Fourth Fyttes as a single poem; and another less skilled poet who compiled the Third and Fifth Fyttes into the work produced by the original poet. Others, such as J. R. Maddicott,, have considered him as less than adequate. They point to a narrative that is not sequential (it jumps back and forth between the tales); the transitions between tales are not smooth; there are inconsistencies within each tale, and between the tales.

=== Sources ===
Child was one of the first to recognize that Gest contains ballads from two different traditions: the Barnsdale tradition (found in the First, Second, and Fourth Fyttes), and the Nottingham tradition (found in the Third, Fifth, and Sixth Fyttes). Clawson then attempted to identify the source ballads. J. C. Holt considers Clawson's work as fundamental to a careful study of Gest, and admits there is no consensus on how many underlying tales were used, or which lines can be considered the work of the Gest poet. In contrast to Clawson, who struggled mightily to connect Gest with existing outlaw ballads, Holt's study indicated that none of the sources have survived, that the tales were not necessarily in verse form, and that the source tales come from several traditions. Why the Gest poet used these particular tales to construct this epic-length poem is unknown.

First Fytte
The First Fytte begins with a now-lost light-hearted tale about Robin Hood and a poor knight. The original tale was obviously part of a Barnsdale tradition of Robin Hood, based upon the numerous references to local landmarks. When the Knight is accosted in Barnsdale, he mentions that he planned to spend the night in either Blyth or Doncaster.

The remainder of the First Fytte is based on a 'Miracle of the Virgin Mary' story. The 'Miracle' was a moral story often told during religious services, and these stories were very popular. They generally concerned the Virgin Mary (or any of the Saints) being invoked as surety for a loan. The most common ending of a Miracle described an actual miracle to repay the loan. There was also a humorous ending where the repayment money is taken from a person in a religious order who in some way represented the Virgin or Saint. In this ending, this person is regarded as the messenger sent by the Virgin or Saint to repay the debt. The First Fytte ends with Robin Hood and his men outfitting the poor knight in a manner befitting a messenger of the Virgin Mary.

Second Fytte
This Fytte has a darker tone. The first part of the Second Fytte appears to be based on another now-lost tale, where a knight repays his debt to an Abbot with money received from Robin Hood. Parts of the original tale remain, even though they do not fit with the end of the First Fytte. In the original tale, the Knight is away on an overseas military campaign, but unexpectedly re-appears. He orders his men to put on their ragged travelling clothes before approaching the abbey. His men and the horses are led to the stables, as the Knight, also in ragged clothes, enters the great hall. Little John is never mentioned, nor is the Abbey named. Near the end of the Fytte, the Knight resumes his good clothing, leaving his ragged clothes at the abbey.
The rest of this Fytte appears to be fragments of other tales, perhaps compiled by the Gest poet. The light-hearted fragment describing how the Knight prepares to repay Robin Hood has an internal consistency, and is reminiscent of the opening lines of the First Fytte. The fair at Wentbridge may have been taken from another tale to be used as a plot device to delay the Knight, thus preparing for the tale of Robin Hood and the Monk in the Fourth Fytte.
Third Fytte
This episode probably consists of three or four now-lost tales. The light-hearted opening scene at the archery shoot could have been borrowed from any of the then-popular tales. After which the Gest poet inserted two quatrains which refer to Little John's courteous master from whom the Sheriff must secure permission. The second now-lost tale is definitely low comedy. The audience is told that Little John is seeking vengeance on the Sheriff for some unspecified action. When Little John is denied breakfast because he slept in, the subsequent action of "exuberant rough-house" "turns into a scene of total destruction", as Little John picks a fight with the butler. The tale then assumes "an air of carnival 'justice'", when he breaks into the pantry to eat and drink his fill.
However, the third tale has a somber tone, as Little John lures the Sheriff into an ambush. Instead of killing them all, Robin makes the Sheriff and his men endure a night on the cold wet ground, wearing nothing but a green mantle.
The last few lines of the Fytte were probably written by the Gest poet. The Sheriff's complains that he would rather have Robin "smite off mine head" than spend another night in the greenwood. Robin then demands the Sheriff swear an oath on Robin's sword not to harm Robin or his men. This little scene is a foreshadow of the scene in the Sixth Fytte, where Robin Hood uses his sword to decapitate the Sheriff as punishment for breaking his oath.
Fourth Fytte
The Second Fytte ended with the Knight being delayed at the fair at Wentbridge. The Fourth Fytte opens with Robin Hood worrying about the Knight's late arrival. It's not about the money; he is fretting about why the Virgin Mary is upset with him. This is the Gest poet's introduction to yet another now-lost tale about Robin and the Monk. This tale is also the ending of the Miracle story, as Little John recognizes that the Monk carries the debt repayment which was ensured by the Virgin Mary.

At the beginning of the Monk tale, there is another inconsistency. When first spotted by Little John, there were two monks. Later, at the feast, there is only one monk mentioned.

The last part of the Fytte is the ending of Tale A. This reunion and reconciliation of Robin and the Knight was most probably original material written by the Gest poet.
Fifth Fytte
The original now-lost tale probably consisted of the archery match, the subsequent attack by the Sheriff's men, the wounding of Little John, and the flight into the greenwood.(lines ) No parallels have been found among the extant contemporary tales. The remainder of the Fytte was composed by the Gest poet.
Sixth Fytte
The original now-lost tale probably consisted of the sheriff capturing a gentle knight, taking him to Nottingham, the knight's wife begging Robin to save her husband, the subsequent skirmish, and the rescued knight becoming a fugitive in Robin's group. Once again, there are no parallels to be found among the extant contemporary tales. The remainder of the Fytte was composed by the Gest poet.
Seventh Fytte
Separately from the Robin Hood ballads, Child discussed the "King and Subject" ballad tradition, in which the King (in disguise) meets with one of his Subjects.[Child, V, pt 1] He mentions in passing that the Seventh and Eighth Fyttes of Gest contains such a tale.[p. 69] Both Child and Clawson dismiss The King's Disguise, and Friendship with Robin Hood (Child 151), (the only extant Robin Hood ballad involving the king) as being an 18th century paraphrase of Gest. Curiously, both also discuss two tales, King Edward and the Shepherd[Rochester] and The King and the Hermit,[Rochester] as being very similar to the original ballad underlying the Seventh Fytte, but never make the connection. Clawson simply remarks that "tales like this are common and popular the world over". However, Thomas Ohlgren considers the parallels between the two tales as part of the evidence supporting his assertion that "our comely king" in Gest was Edward III. (See Historical Analysis)
Eighth Fytte
Both Child and Clawson are silent on possible sources for this fytte.

=== Character descriptions ===
Most of the main characters are described in 52 lines at the beginning of the poem. Thus the Gest poet immediately draws attention to the purpose of his work. Gest's scenes are constructed to show the difference in the behavior of good and wicked characters. Goodness (referred to as "Courtesy") is displayed as ethical or moral qualities, such as kindness, generosity, truthfulness, and personal loyalty. "Courtesy" (the word occurs 17 times in Gest) is the opposite of injustice.

Robin Hood
good yeoman

See Historical Analysis section for a fuller description of yeoman as used in Gest.

proud outlaw

This is the only time 'proud' is applied to Robin Hood; but it is applied to the Sheriff of Nottingham 20 times throughout the Gest. The word is being used in two different senses. When applied to the Sheriff, proud means 'haughty, arrogant'. When applied to Robin, proud means 'brave, bold, valiant', or 'noble in bearing or appearance'.

courteous outlaw

In Middle English, courtesy meant 'refined, well-mannered, polite' and 'gracious, benevolent, generous, merciful'. Robin repeatedly exhibits all these traits.

devout

Robin hears three masses a day, and has a special devotion to the Virgin Mary. The latter is a strong motivator for him in Tale A.

leadership

Robin is able to impose a code of conduct upon his fellow outlaws. He insists that they can do "well enough" by not waylaying farmers, yeomen, or any knight or squire who is a "good fellow". He singles out bishops and archbishops for beatings. Robin has a particularly strong hostility for the Sheriff of Nottingham.

Little John
He defers to Robin by calling him "Master", and serves as Robin's right-hand man. But he is not reluctant in letting Robin know how he feels about following his orders. He agrees to follow Robin's code of conduct for the fellowship, but shows his concern (or irritation) when Robin insists on finding a stranger for dinner so late in the day.
Much, the miller's son
Apparently of short stature, Much is praised as every "inch of his body ... worth a man". Much saves a wounded Little John by carrying him on his back.

The remaining characters are described when they appear in the tale. Each character is described by one or more of their ethical or moral qualities. There are only three characters who are given a physical description.

The Sorrowful Knight
The Gest poet spends eight lines describing his physical appearance. Little John, a good judge of people, calls him "gentle", "courteous", and "noble". These qualities the Knight demonstrates repeatedly in Tales A and B.
The Greedy Abbot and the Kind-hearted Prior
The qualities of these two characters are revealed during their conversation at dinner, while awaiting the arrival of the Knight. The Abbot compounds his wickedness with a lie by calling the Knight "false".
The Chief Steward
He is introduced as "a fat-headed monk", emphasizing the fat cheeks and neck under his monk's tonsure. Little John calls him "a churl monk"; insulting the monk twice with a single word. In Middle English it meant a person lacking in courtesy, or a person of low birth.
Sheriff of Nottingham
He is the stereotypical wicked villain with no redeeming qualities. He lies when he tells the King that the Knight is a traitor, but later becomes a traitor himself by breaking his oath to Robin.
King Edward

== Linguistic analysis ==
Francis James Child was the first to look at Gest from a linguistic perspective. While compiling The English and Scottish Popular Ballads, he was in frequent contact with language scholars in England who were collecting quotations from Middle English texts for what would become the first volumes of the Oxford English Dictionary. These scholars, including Walter William Skeat, the leading philologist in England, would later publish A Concise Dictionary of Middle English, and An Etymological Dictionary of the English Language. It was Skeat who provided Child with transcriptions of the texts that appeared in Child's anthology. Skeat also was one of the first philologists to discuss English language dialects in English Dialects from the Eighth Century to the Present Day published in 1911.

In his introduction to Gest, Child tried to argue that the references to Robin Hood in Piers Plowman and the Scottish chronicles indicated a date of composition for Gest as early as 1400, or even earlier. However, he was forced to conclude that "There are no firm grounds on which to base an opinion." Child asserted that there were "A considerable number of Middle-English forms" present; he even constructed a partial listing of the words ending in '-e'. William Hall Clawson, a doctoral student under Child's successor, George Lyman Kittredge, expanded Child's word list, and even calculated the final totals of how many times such words were used in each Fytte. Thus Clawson attempted to "prove clearly that it [Gest] extends back to a period ... antedating the year 1400."

A modern linguistic analysis of Gest was performed by Masa Ikegami in 1985. He constructed multiple lines of linguistic evidence that Gest was written in a Northern or East Midlands dialect, most probably during the mid- to late-15th century. His evidence is based upon Gest's quatrain structure, its ABCB or ABAB rhyme scheme, and its meter (rhythm pattern). The Gest meter can be summarized as:

- the first and third lines have four metrically stressed syllables
- the second and fourth lines have three metrically stressed syllables
- each stressed syllable is preceded by one or two unstressed syllables

This meter is illustrated in the following quatrain, which should be read aloud in order to hear the rhythm of the stressed syllables (in bold font):

Where we shall take, where we shall leave,
Where we shall a-bide be-hind;
Where we shall rob, where we shall reive,
Where we shall beat and bind.

— Gest of Robyn Hood, lines 45–48 (modern spelling)

Irregular lines do occur, but they are limited, and only occur in the three-beat lines.

=== Evidence of date of composition ===
==== Presence of silent final '-e' ====
Modern linguists no longer accept the presence of final '-e' (now known as schwa) as evidence for composition prior to 1400. Ikegami provides a summary of other works known to have been composed in the 15th century that contain the silent final '-e'.

The silent final '-e' does not have to be pronounced in Gest in order to support the meter (rhythm pattern). Ikegami uses the example of 'grene wode', which Modern English speakers pronounce as two syllables: 'green wood'. In Chaucer's time, the phrase would have been pronounced as four syllables: 'gre-ne wo-de', where the schwa was pronounced as the 'a' in 'sofa' or the 'u' in 'lucky'. The phrase 'grene wode' occurs thirteen times in Gest, and the silent final '-e' never needs to be pronounced in order to "keep the beat".

==== Presence of new phraseology ====
As a replacement for the now-silent '-e', Ikegami points out that the Gest poet introduces a new phrase construct: adjective + adjective|noun + noun. Some examples (with the stressed syllables in bold font and in modern spelling) are:

The head and feathers of rich red gold (line 1149)
adj + adj + noun
The good white bread, the good red wine (line 1571)
adj + adj + noun adj + adj + noun
Thou art one of the best sword men (line 674)
adj + noun + noun

— Gest of Robyn Hood, (modern spelling)

Ikegami remarks that no works prior to 1400 have this phrasing. Rather, Gest's use of this phrasing is similar to that of The Floure and the Leafe, which is considered to have been composed during the third quarter of the 15th century (c. 1450–1475).

==== Frequent use of 'long e' rhyme ====
The Gest poet uses several rhymes that only work if the modern 'long e' sound is used. Some examples, with only the rhyming words shown, follow:

be : yeomanry (lines 178, 180)
he : courtesy (lines 358, 360)
tree : company (lines 1226, 1228)

— Gest of Robyn Hood, (modern spelling)

The modern 'long e' sound is considered to be one of the earliest changes associated with the Great Vowel Shift which began c. 1400.

==== Rhyming 'all' with 'tale' ====
This rhyme only works after c. 1400. It is also associated with the great vowel shift.

=== Evidence of Northern or East Midland dialect ===
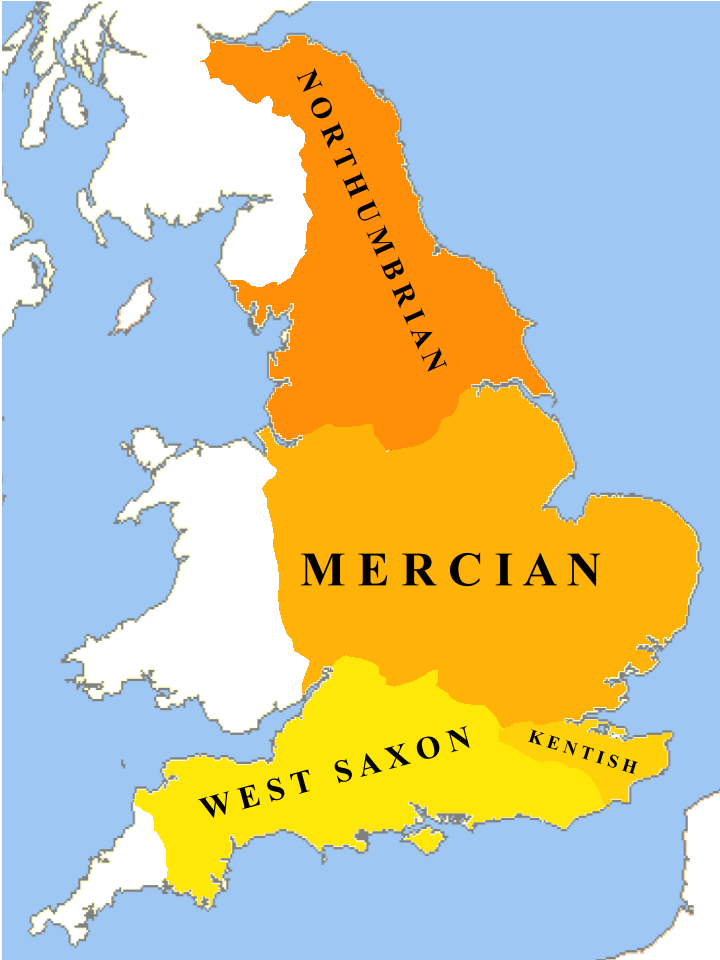
Approximate locations of Old English dialects just prior to the Viking incursions. Most surviving Old English texts were written in the West Saxon dialect. Modern standard English (as spoken) descends mostly from the Mercian dialect, while the modern spelling derives from the West Saxon dialect of London.

The linguistic research begun by Skeat and his colleagues (as published in their various Middle English dictionaries) has been continued by modern linguists. Between 1898 and 1905, Joseph Wright published the seminal English Dialect Dictionary, based upon data collected by the English Dialect Society. The famous Survey of English Dialects was undertaken between 1950 and 1961. Therefore, linguists have as detailed an understanding of the various Middle English dialects as the surviving literature and native speakers allow. The evidence for a Northern or East Midland dialect within the very words of Gest relies on the observation that, prior to standardization of English language spelling, Middle English authors spelled words as they were pronounced (that is, phonetically). Thus the rhyme words in each quatrain are also very valuable in determining whether or not regional dialects can be identified in Gest. Some of Ikegami's findings are below.

Late 9th-century extent of Danelaw and Old Norse. The Danelaw included the eastern half of Mercian dialect region (indicated as 'Danish Mercia'), and the southern part of the Northumbrian dialect region (north of the Humber estuary).

Northern pronunciation
The Northern England dialect of Middle English (ME) results from a mixture of the Anglian dialects of Old English (OE) and the Old Norse (ON) of the Danelaw, with an overlay of Norman French.
- The OE/ON vowel ā (long a) appears as ME /a:/ (pronounced roughly like the 'a' in father) in the rhyme pair hame:dame. The non-Northern vowel /ɔ:/ (pronounced roughly like 'aw' in law) appears in the rhyme pair more:before.
- The OE/ON diphthong āg (equivalent to 'w') appears as ME /au/ (pronounced roughly like the 'ou' in house) in the rhyme pair lowe:shawe. The non-Northern ME diphthong /ɔu/ (pronounced roughly like the 'o' in bone) appears in the rhyme pair lowe:inowe.

Northern and Eastern Midlands pronunciation
The Eastern Midlands dialect of ME results from a mixture of the OE Mercian dialect and the ON of the Danelaw, with an overlay of Norman French.
- There are two sequences of long vowel pronunciation changes which are characteristic of Northern and Eastern Midland dialects. The OE long vowel ǣ (pronounced roughly like the 'a' in mat) was raised to the ME long open vowel /ɛ:/ (pronounced roughly like the 'a' in hay), and raised again to ME close /e/ (pronounced roughly like the 'e' in bet). Similarly, the OE long vowel ā was also raised to ME long open vowel /ɛ:/, and then raised again to ME close /o:/ (pronounced roughly like the 'oa' in boat). These changes appear in the rhyme pairs: see:the; mone:none; do:theretoo; ere:chere.
- Additional vowel pronunciations which are typical of the North and the East Midlands include OE short y appearing as /i/, pronounced roughly like the 'i' in bit (rhyme pair synne:in; and OE or ON long ȳ appearing as /i:/, pronounced roughly like the 'ee' in see (rhyme pair pryde:beside.

== Historical analysis ==
Maurice Keen wrote The Outlaws of Medieval Legend in 1961, which compared the historical background of the Robin Hood ballads with other legendary and historical outlaw figures. Over the next four decades, various historians contributed to the debate on which historical periods are depicted in the Robin Hood ballads. In 1968, D C Fowler published A Literary History of the Popular Ballad as a modern update to Child's Ballads. He focused on the historical background of Gest and the earliest Robin Hood tales. (Note: Gest (Child 117), c. 1493–1518, is considered as one of the three oldest Robin Hood tales in Child's anthology. The other two are Robin Hood and the Monk (Child 119), c. after 1450, and Robin Hood and the Potter (Child 121), c. 1500. Two incomplete tales dated to c. 1450, The King and the Shepherd and The King and the Hermit, are also compared with Gest, but were not included in Child's anthology. A ballad sometimes compared with Gest is Adam Bell, Clim of the Clough, and William of Cloudesley (Child 116), c. 1557.) Many of the Child Robin Hood ballads were composed later, some as late as the 17th century, and are not relevant to explorations of the 14th–16th century versions of the Robin Hood legend.

The linguistic analysis suggests that Gest was probably compiled c. 1450–1475. The literary analysis suggests that the component tales were written down prior to 1450 from earlier oral forms which no longer exist. Various linkages can be made between historical events and evidence from the 14th and 15th centuries and the society portrayed within the internal bounds of Gest, such as Robin's yeoman status as compared to other yeomen in the tales; which King Edward is referred to; references to changing feudal practices and the abuses of late medieval England; and the probable early audiences.

=== Political and military events ===
In 2013, Joseph Taylor, aware of Ikegami's linguistic analysis, examined Gest as a northern text in the historical regional context of northern England. Northeast England has a history of political, cultural, and military separateness from southern England since the Heptarchy, when it was the Kingdom of Northumbria, which was later invaded and settled by the Vikings as the Kingdom of Jorvik. After the Norman Conquest, the Earl of Northumbria and the prince-bishops of the County Palatine of Durham were given political and military power second only to the King in London. The strategic geographic location of the northern counties was formally recognized in 1249 under a treaty which established the Scottish Marches as a buffer zone between Scotland and England. Each of the six Marches (three English and three Scottish) were controlled by their own Wardens. Many of the English East Wardens were appointed from powerful regional families, such as the Percies, the Nevilles, and the Cliffords. The border conflicts meant money and power to these regional families. As "kings in the North", they maintained private armies to control, as well as defend, England's border. The intermittent wars with Scotland also provided political leverage with the King in London, who fully realized that only the northern magnates could mobilize the necessary troops against Scotland — or against London.

This sense of separateness is reflected in the Gest in the way London is portrayed as the power base for the villainous Abbot of St Mary's and Sheriff of Nottingham (see here).

Parliament's rise in importance during the 14th century also provided the Northern magnates with a legitimate means to restrict royal power within their counties.

=== Social changes ===
1. the Hundred Years' War which was actually three phases of war separated by truces
2. ongoing clashes between the York and Lancaster dynasties over the throne of England; which attached the Duchy of Lancaster to the Crown under Henry IV, and the Duchy of York to the Crown under Edward IV. Following the Wars of the Roses, political power was finally consolidated under Henry VII.
3. social changes caused by the breakup of the English feudal system

One important social change which occurred in response to the changes brought about by the climate, diseases, and military upheavals is the gradual change in the meaning of the term yeoman, which is used repeatedly in Gest. During the 14th and 15th centuries, between the time when the component tales were still in oral form and the time when Gest was compiled, the meaning of "yeoman" changed substantially. Originally, "yeoman" was a rank of noble household service as well as the chivalric rank between page and squire. By the late 14th century, it was also used to refer to freeborn and free tenure smallholders. During the 15th century, it began to refer to the growing social category (referred to as a "middling sort"), consisting of the now land-wealthy commoner landowners and the land-poor younger sons of nobility. (Primogeniture dictated that only the eldest son could inherit the family estates.) This self-identification was re-inforced by the 1413 Statute of Additions under Henry V, in which those paying the polltax had to specify their status and occupation. Eventually, "yeoman" expanded to include husbandmen who practiced a trade or craft to supplement their farming income. These shifts in meaning are evident in Gest when the component tales are considered separately from the narrative arc (see here).

=== Yeoman in Gest ===
Richard Almond and A. J. Pollard did a study of the earliest Robin Hood tales, including Gest, Robin Hood and the Monk, Robin Hood and the Potter, and Robin Hood and Guy of Gisborne. To address this spectrum of possible meanings of 'yeoman' over the centuries, they proposed that, within Gest, the 'yeoman' Robin Hood has to be studied (1) separately from the minor characters called "yeoman", and (2) separately from the 'yeoman' of the audience. They referred to this confusion in the various meanings of 'yeoman' as the "slipperiness of social terminology" in the 15th century. Their main source, Peter Coss, also considered another confusion factor, that Gest was compiled from multiple source tales. Some historical clues found within Gest and the possible source tales, and the changing meanings of 'yeoman', are below.

==== Robin as yeoman of the forest? ====
Almond and Pollard credited J. C. Holt with being the first historian to recognize the connection between a yeoman and the forest. Based upon clues within the text, Almond and Pollard extended Holt's idea, and proposed that audiences of the 15th century would have recognized Robin Hood as being a forester of Barnsdale or Sherwood because of these clues:

use of the phrase 'yeoman of the forest'

The phrase appears in the Fourth Fytte, and again in the Seventh Fytte. The former scene is when the Chief Steward insults Robin Hood by calling him a thief, to which Little John retorts that Robin is a 'yeoman of the forest'. The latter scene is when Robin Hood stops the disguised king, and introduces himself and his men as 'yeomen of the forest', now forced to dine on the King's deer. Almond and Pollard propose that the importance which appears to be attached to the phrase in these scenes indicate that Robin and his fellowship are more than mere outlaws taking refuge in the greenwood.

Robin 'walking' in the forest

In the Sixth Fytte, Robin is described as walking in the forest, much to the chagrin of the Sheriff. Almond and Pollard suggest that "walking" should be interpreted in the sense of walking associated with an occupation, such as a "police officer walking his beat" meaning a police officer patrolling his assigned area. This interpretation is supported by who described the foresters as sworn to protect the "vert and venison" within their assigned areas, which were known as divisions, wards, bailiwicks, or walks.
This phrase occurs after Robin and his men leave Sir Richard's castle, and before the Sheriff captures Sir Richard. It may be a part of a transition between fragments of two separate tales.

other 'good yeomen' who 'walk'

In the First Fytte, Robin forbids his men to waylay "good yeoman/That walketh by green wood shawe [thicket]". Almond and Pollard suggest that here Robin is referring to the other forest officials who were also yeomen: verderer, woodward, ranger, or agister.

only a 'proud forester' can catch Robin

In the Seventh Fytte only a "proud forester" in royal service knows how to track Robin down. And that was by disguising the King as an abbot and five of his bodyguards as monks; in other words, it takes a forester to catch a forester. It is unknown if this opening fragment is from a now-lost tale or part of the Gest poet's transition between the Sixth and Seventh Fyttes.

===== Robin's knowledge of royal hunt rituals =====
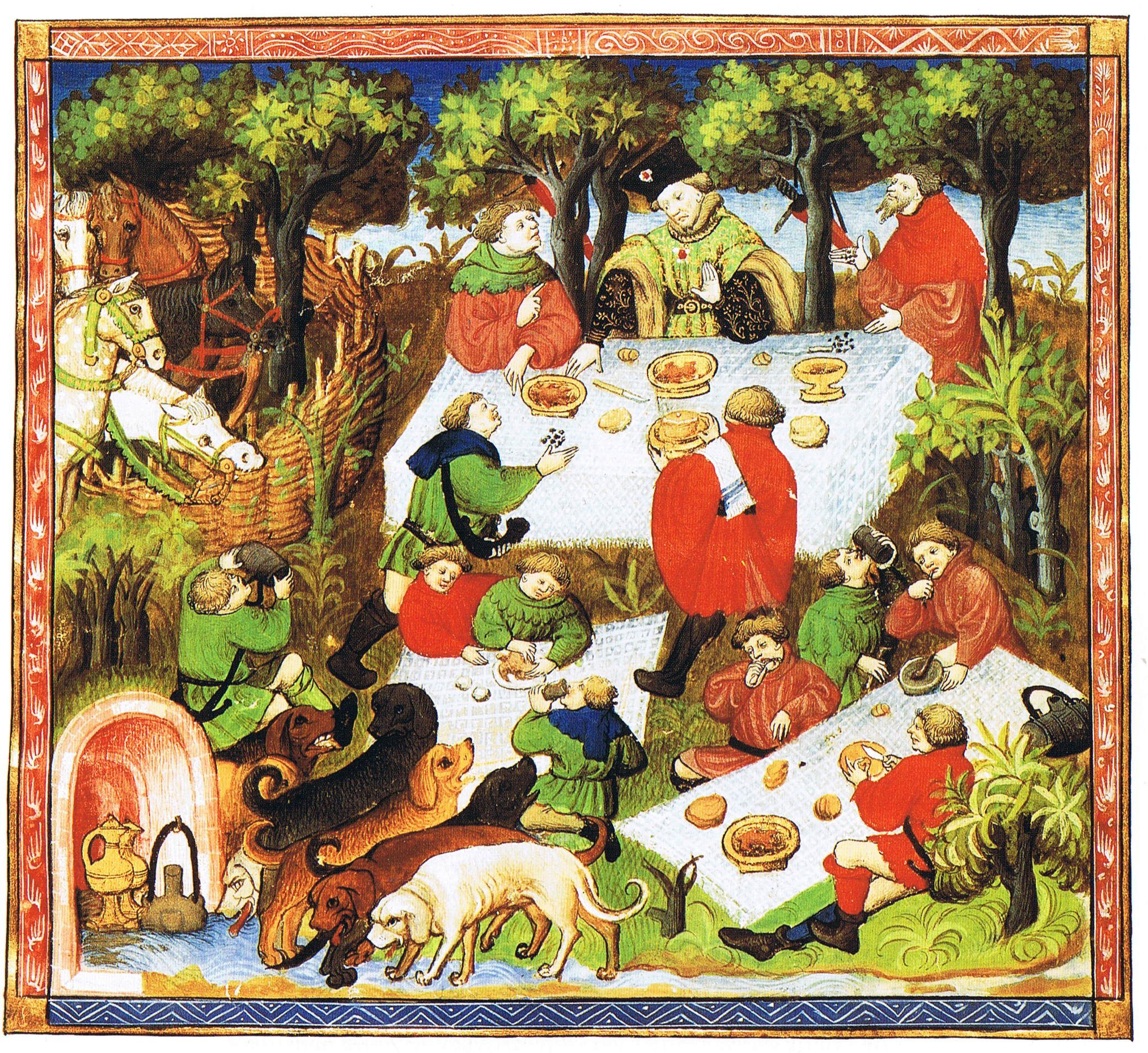
Forest feast under the tryst tree. Miniature from le Livre de chasse.

Almond and Pollard have traced some of the hunting rituals and terminology found in Gest back to The Master of Game, a hunting book translated in 1413 from French by Edward, Duke of York. They point out that in all the English-language 15th-century hunting literature, 'yeoman' is used consistently to refer to the hunt and forest officials.

"Bow and stable" was the hunting technique in which herds of deer are driven by foresters and professional huntsmen towards the stationary noble hunters. The tryst tree is where the noble huntsman stood, with his bowbearer and his hound handlers, to await the deer being flushed toward them. Sometimes a lodge or hut made of green boughs would be built at the tryst for shelter as well as camouflage.

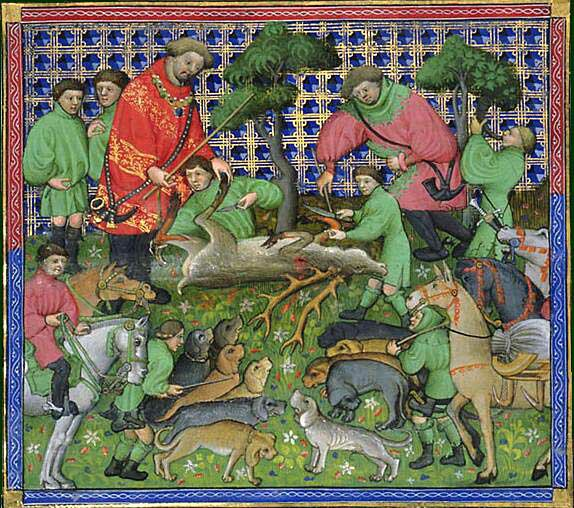
Ritual butchery under the tryst tree. Miniature from le Livre de chasse.

Almond and Pollard compare the 'royal' dinner prepared by Robin for the disguised King in the Seventh Fytte to that described in The Master of Game. Believing the abbot to be the King's emissary since he carries the Privy Seal, Robin invites him to a royal hunt. Robin escorts his honored guest by the hand (as is required of the yeoman of the bow) to the tryst tree. There the deer are slain and ritually butchered (dyghtande is a northern England term for the ritual). The butchering is done by Robin himself for the disguised King, who was given the prime cuts of venison, along with bread and wine.

In Gest, the huntsman's hut serves as the tryst tree for the dinners with the Knight in the First Fytte and the Chief Steward of St Mary's in the Fourth Fytte. The Knight is given swan and pheasant, a noble's repast, but also the numbles, which was traditionally reserved for the foresters and the huntsmen.

This royal (or noble) hunt familiarity may indicate that the Gest poet was a member of either a royal or noble household; or it may indicate that hunting tales were part of his repertoire; or both. Coss proposes that the Gest poet had a fairly large body of source material from which to choose. And since he chose to weave his sources together, rather than lay them end-to-end, it is difficult to untangle the now-lost tales which he used.

===== Comparison with Chaucer's yeoman =====
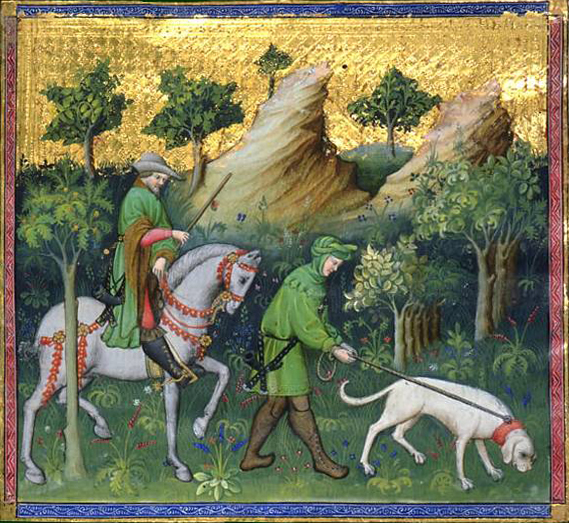
Deer hunting scene. Miniature from le Livre de chasse (1387-89)

Almond and Pollard also credited J. C. Holt as the first historian to notice the resemblance between Robin Hood and Geoffrey Chaucer's The Knight's Yeoman in The Canterbury Tales. But Holt never realized the significance of the Yeoman's accoutrements: his green coat and hood, his bow and arrows; his buckler and sword; and his horn attached to a green baldric. All of which indicated the Yeoman was a forester and huntsman; a position with which Chaucer was certainly familiar. He served as forester of North Petherton Park in Somersetshire for the last decade of his life.

The green livery of the forester and huntsman is depicted in many of the miniatures of the Livre de chasse, written by Gaston III, Count of Foix, in the late 14th century.

==== Minor yeoman characters ====
- Much, the Miller's son, and Will Scarlock, are both described as yeomen in the First Fytte, as they stand on the Saylis looking for Robin's guest. When combined with Robin's description of his men as 'yeomen of the forest' in the Seventh Fytte, the implication is that they are both foresters.(See above.)
- In the Second Fytte, the young men participating in the wrestling match are described as yeomen. But since no details are given, the exact meaning is uncertain.
- In the Third Fytte, Robin welcomes Little John back to the greenwood, and refers to the Sheriff's cook as a "fair yeoman". Robin probably recognized the cook's clothing as being from the Sheriff's household. 'Yeoman' was a service rank in the household kitchen.
- In the Eighth Fytte, the townspeople of Nottingham are called "both yeomen and knaves". Here 'yeomen' refers to the tradesmen, and knaves refers to the common laborers.
- In the First Fytte, Little John is introduced as a "good yeoman" standing next to Robin. Throughout Gest, Little John refers to Robin as his master. He also demonstrates a courtesy equal to that of Robin's in his interactions with the Sorrowful Knight and the disguised King.
  Robin later offers Little John's service to the Sorrowful Knight as knave, who can serve as a yeoman in time of need. Here the meaning of 'knave' is an attendant, and 'yeoman' refers to the military (chivalric) rank.
  Later on, in the Third Fytte, Little John, in the guise of Reynold Greenleaf the knave, infiltrates the Sheriff's household in order to wreak vengeance on the Sheriff.

=== Which King Edward? ===
Almond and Pollard's approach coincides neatly with the results of Thomas Ohlgren's study of 'which' King Edward is meant in Gest. Ohlgren asserts that the individual tales were composed during the early decades of the reign of Edward III (r 1327–1377). He bases his assertion on internal evidence (references made in the text) concerning feudalism, livery and maintenance, and other details that can be traced back to Edward III's reign. Ohlgren proposes that Gest was compiled from these individual tales during the reign of Henry V (1413–1422) or Henry VI (first reign 1422–1461). He uses the example of the 14th-century political poems of Laurence Minot, whose poems were recopied during Henry V's reign to celebrate Henry's victories in France. Similarly, some of the Robin Hood tales which referred to Edward III could have been compiled as Gest. Ohlgren argues that cultural references made in the original tales would only be understood by an audience who was no more than two or three generations later than Edward III. To support his assertion, Ohlgren considers clues which can be found within the text of Gest.

"Edward our comely King"

The king is referred to as "Edward, our comely king". But which King Edward is it? The epithet is the first clue. Olhgren recently discovered a similar epithet in the political poetry written by Laurence Minot in the 14th century. Minot composed poems in Middle English celebrating the victories of Edward III, including those against the Scots (Battle of Halidon Hill in 1333) and against the French (Siege of Guînes (1352)). They were probably written not long after the events, but eleven of his political poems were revised c. 1352 to form a continuous narrative. They were popular enough to have been recopied during the reign of Henry V or Henry VI (our earliest surviving text is dated to 1425–1450). Minot's poem IV begins:

Edward, our comely king
in Brabant has his dwelling
with many comely knight.

Ohlgren considered this significant, as only two works are known to use the phrase "Edward our comely king": Minot's poem IV and Gest. By itself, this evidence is not convincing; but the other three clues, which are inter-related, add weight to his argument.

"far beyond the sea/In England right"

In the Second Fytte, the greedy Abbot is gloating that this is the Knight's last day to repay his debt, then his lands will be forfeit. The kind-hearted Prior rebukes the Abbot:

The knight is far beyond the sea,
In England right,
And suffer hunger and cold,
And many a sorry night.

"Far beyond the sea" has been usually interpreted as the Knight being on crusade or a pilgrimage, but Ohlgren considers it to mean that the Knight was fighting in France at the beginning of the Hundred Years' War. "In England right" was the rallying cry for Edward III's legal claim to certain territories in France – and to the French throne. The phrase appears four times in Minot's poems, and it always refers to Edward's legal claim.

"Saint Quentin"

In the Fifth Fytte, Sir Richard at the Lee shelters Robin and his fellowship from the Sheriff's posse comitatus:

For one thing, Robin, I thee promise;
I swear by Saint Quentin,
These forty days thou dwellest with me,
To soup, eat, and dine.

Sir Richard swears by Saint Quentin to house Robin for forty days. Saint Quentin was a 3rd-century Christian martyr whose pilgrimage cult at the Basilica of Saint-Quentin in Saint-Quentin, Aisne flourished during the Middle Ages. Saint-Quentin is not far from Thiérache, site of the first encounter between Edward III and Philip VI of France during the chevauchée of 1339.

Possible source tales for the Seventh Fytte

Ohlgren draws attention to two tales which are considered part of the "King and Subject" tradition as described by Child: King Edward and Shepherd (hereafter called Shepherd) and King and Hermit (hereafter called Hermit). Both tales were mentioned by Child as part of his discussion of King Edward the Fourth and a Tanner of Tamworth (#273).[Child, V, p ??] Curiously, Child included Tanner, which survives as a 17th-century text, but he does not include either Shepherd or Hermit, both of which survive as incomplete manuscripts dated c. 1450. In Olgren's study of the two tales, he has concluded that there is nothing "to preclude their having been used as the sources for the 'King and the Subject' theme in Gest."
Shepherd is preserved as part of the same manuscript which contains Robin Hood and the Monk. Shepherd unambiguously describes Edward III as the King:

- born at Windsor Castle
- father was a Welsh knight; mother was named Isabella
- his steward is Ralph Stafford, 1st Earl of Stafford
- Henry of Grosmont, 1st Duke of Lancaster, and John de Warenne, 7th Earl of Surrey, are mentioned

"Hermit" is preserved ...
Shepherd and Hermit share plot similarities: a disguised king who seeks out his subjects to listen to their complaints; he dines on what turns out to be a dinner consisting of poached venison and fowl; the subject engages the king in a drinking game; the king invites the subject to court, where the king's true identity is revealed. Both tales contain interesting plot details which parallel Gest:

- In Shepherd, a hand-washing ritual occurs prior to the feast at court; in Gest the ritual occurs prior to Robin's meals with the Knight and with the Monk.
- The first meal provided by the Shepherd to the King is similar to that provided by Robin to the Knight.
- The second meal provided by the Shepherd to his King is similar to the meal provided by Robin to his King.
- In Hermit, the King is lured into the forest by the promise of a great-headed deer. The incident occurs five miles from Nottingham. In Gest, this is similar to Little John's ruse to lure the Sheriff into the greenwood, in which Little John runs five miles to the Sheriff's hunting party with news of a great green hart.
Cultural memory of Edward III

Shepherd and Hermit, as well as the political poems of Minot, are examples of a cultural memory of Edward III that persisted some three or four generations after his death. (This cultural memory may have been encouraged by Henry IV, a grandson of Edward III, who had usurped the throne from Richard II, son of Edward the Black Prince, in 1399.) Edward was remembered as having concern for his subjects, and was committed to redressing injustices committed by his officials.
Another popular text was the "De reginine principum", which was translated (1411–12) into Middle English by Privy Seal clerk Thomas Hoccleve as the Regiment of Princes. Hoccleve addressed his poem to Henry of Monmouth, Prince of Wales and Duke of Lancaster (the future Henry V). Henry IV was in poor health, and his son had taken over the reins of government in 1410. In the Regiment of Princes, Hoccleve included many references to Edward's personal life and events of his time. Hoccleve advices Henry to personally find out what his subjects think of him in the section "Of Justice". Like "Edward the last", Henry should travel among his subjects "in simple array alone" "To hear what men said of thy person" (modern spelling). The King is obligated to help them. If his officials are oppressing the people, he is to redress the wrongs done.

=== Sir Richard as army recruiter? ===
Ohlgren draws attention to the Knight's activities during the year before his 400-pound debt repayment is due to Robin Hood in the Second Fytte. The Knight's income from his lands is only 400 pounds, so how is he paying for the men and equipment?

Ohlgren proposes that the money could have come from two sources: indenture and purveyance. Indenture was started by Edward I as a way of supplementing the number of troops raised through the feudal (tenure) levies, but it became almost standard practice under Edward III, who used it to recruit the rank and file of his armies.[1954_Lyon, p. 503–504] In the 14th and 15th centuries, purveyance [MED, sense 3, 4] meant recruiting men, clothing them, furnishing the equipment for a campaign, and providing food and transportation for them to the English coast. The 100 men-at-arms mentioned in the text don't seem to have been the Knight's personal retinue, the uniforms being red and white. These colors belonged to Richard Fitzalan, 3rd Earl of Arundel, who served in almost all of Edward III's French campaigns. Recruiting and outfitting these men could have earned the Knight between 250 and 650 pounds.

=== Livery and fees ===
Livery originally referred to a lord providing food and clothing to his household servants. It later expanded to refer to the distinctive uniform worn by the lord's servants. Under the original English feudalism as imported by the Normans, a tenant-in-chief's feudal obligations to the king were originally defined by tenure. Those who accepted lands from the king were expected to return specified services at his command, such as fealty, suit of court, and military service. The latter was known as knight's service. The English invasions of Scotland during the reign of Edward I demanded more men-at-arms and archers than the traditional feudal methods could supply. This situation became even more acute under his grandson Edward III at the beginning of the Hundred Years War. Indentures were drawn up between the king and his lords, and between the lords and their sub-tenants or captains of men, for the provision of a certain number of men-at-arms and archers. These men were equipped with weapons and furnished with distinctive clothing or badges as a means of identification.

Under a strong king, such as Edward III, the increased power of regional magnates afforded by this practice could be restrained, but under a weak king, such as Richard II, abuses became rampant. In 1377, 1384, and 1388, Parliament protested against the abuses, now referred to as livery and maintenance. Parliament was concerned about the increasing number of liveried retainers involved in violence and riots who expected to escape legal retribution through the sheriffs and justices of the peace who could be retained by their lord.

Throughout Gest, there are several references to the expanded use of livery and fees during the 14th and 15th centuries. The following incidents indicate that Robin bestowed liveries upon his men (or at least provided the cloth). As mentioned above, this was considered acceptable practice during wartime under the terms of the indentures with Robin, who is considered a yeoman leader, or captain, of men.

Robin Hood and the Knight

In the First Fytte, Robin Hood agrees to provide livery to the threadbare Knight. Little John then measures out a generous three yards of scarlet and raye (striped)[MED_raye] cloth, which he hands over to the Knight.

Little John and the Cook

In the Third Fytte, on Robin's behalf, Little John offers to the Cook twenty marks and two sets of clothing per year as incentive to join Robin's fellowship.

Robin and King Edward

In the Eighth Fytte, King Edward asks to purchase from Robin green cloth to replace their gray monk's robes.

Robin at Edward's court

In the Eighth Fytte, Robin has spent all his wealth on fees for his men.

Sheriff and Little John

In the Third Fytte, the Sheriff offers to retain Little John as a member of his household for 20 marks per year.

However, the most prominent incident is the illegal practice of 'cloth and fee' described in the Second Fytte. 'Cloth and fee' (another name for livery and fee) refers to the payment of money and gifts of clothing to the King's justice in return for favourable legal services. This practice became so prevalent that, in 1346, Edward III issued a statute requiring his justices to swear an oath that they would only accept 'cloth and fee' from the King himself. In this episode, the Abbot is trying to defraud the Knight of his land, so he retains a County Justice, the King's officer, to force the issue in the Abbot's favor. Once the Abbot has publicly insulted the Knight, the Chief Justice seeks to defuse the situation by suggesting the Abbot offer to purchase the land outright. The ridiculously low price offered by the Abbot is yet another insult to the Knight, which prompts the Knight to empty the bag of Robin's 400 pounds onto the Abbot's table. The Knight then declares to all present to bear witness to the fact that he has redeemed his land legally.

=== Peasants' revolt of 1381 ===
Most of the initial historical interpretations placing Gest during the 14th century were based upon a misreading of Child's discussion of a possible date of composition for Gest. Child placed his conclusion ("There are no firm grounds on which to base an opinion.") at the end of a lengthy discussion in which he unsuccessfully attempted to date Gest to 1400 or earlier. Based upon this misreading, for the next century scholars continued to propose that since Piers Plowman is connected with the Peasants' revolt, and since the priest Sloth mentions "rymes of Robyn Hode", then Robin Hood is also connected. However, Langland gives no indication as to what these rhymes are, and there are no surviving rhymes from Langland's lifetime.

According to Richard Almond and A. J. Pollard, the association between Robin Hood and the issues of the Peasants' Revolt was first made by Rodney Hilton in 1958, when he described Robin Hood as "a free peasant representing peasant ideology for a peasant audience". However, in 1961, J. C. Holt rebutted Hilton, asserting that the Robin Hood tales were composed in castle and manor halls, a position Holt expanded upon in his book. Since then, a consensus has emerged that Robin Hood represented a new social group above the peasants and below those who bore a coat of arms, a group which is often referred to as the "middling sort". Gest does not appear to be concerned with peasants' issues, and is not particularly similar in themes with surviving songs of the peasantry.

=== Forest law and poaching ===
In Gest, several references to Robin Hood's fellowship poaching the King's deer are mentioned as passing remarks. They are not further developed, however, and do not appear to be a core part of the early Robin Hood legend. Mentions include:

- when itemizing the Knight's dinner menu in the First Fytte, and the King's dinner menu in the Seventh Fytte
- in the transition between the Sixth and Seventh Fyttes, the Gest poet speaks of how King Edward travelled throughout Lancashire, without seeing the usual large herds of deer
- when Robin Hood accosts the disguised King Edward in the Seventh Fytte

== As a ballad ==
Gest was included by Francis Child as part of his influential collection of ballads, the Child Ballads, as number 117 in volume 3 of his collection The English and Scottish Popular Ballads. He had earlier published a version in 1859. Its quatrain structure and rhyme scheme fits with other Middle English ballads. However, Gest, along with other traditional border ballads of the Anglo-Scottish border and ballads of Robin Hood, has its own distinctions from other Child ballads. They are narratives, which generally lack a chorus or refrain, and appear to have been composed as recitations before an audience. Only Gest is considered comparable to the Danish and English heroic ballads, (Note: Hart's analysis included the following as heroic ballads: 31 ballads from Svend Grundtvig's Danmarks gamle Folkeviser, volume 1 (numbers 1–17 and 19–32); Child ballads Sir Aldinger (59), King Estmere (60), Sir Cawline (61), Bewick and Graham (211)) the epic poem Beowulf, and the great Middle English romances – Havelok the Dane and The Tale of Gamelyn.

In the Roud Folk Song Index, Gest is listed as number 70.

=== Rhyme and rhythm schemes ===
Lythe and listen, gentlemen
That be of free-born blood;
I shall you tell of a good yeoman
His name was Robyn Hode.

Thus begins the Gest; calling all free-born gentlemen to hear tales of the good yeoman Robyn Hode. The lines within the quatrain have an ABCB rhyme scheme, in which the last words of lines 2 and 4 rhyme, but the last words of lines 1 and 3 may or may not. The words in each line also have a rhythm or beat due to the combinations of stressed and unstressed syllables. Lines 1 and 3 have four stressed syllables, while lines 2 and 4 have three stressed syllables. Each stressed syllable is preceded by one or two unstressed syllables. Another excerpt, which if read aloud has stressed syllables in bold font to demonstrate the intended rhythm:

Robyn stood in Barnesdale,
And leaned him to a tree,
And by him stood Little John,
A good yeoman was he.

A musical interpretation of this vocal pattern was recorded in 2002 by Bob Frank in a modern English version entitled A Little Gest of Robin Hood. Frank accompanied himself with an acoustic guitar, while reciting the lines in a talking blues style.

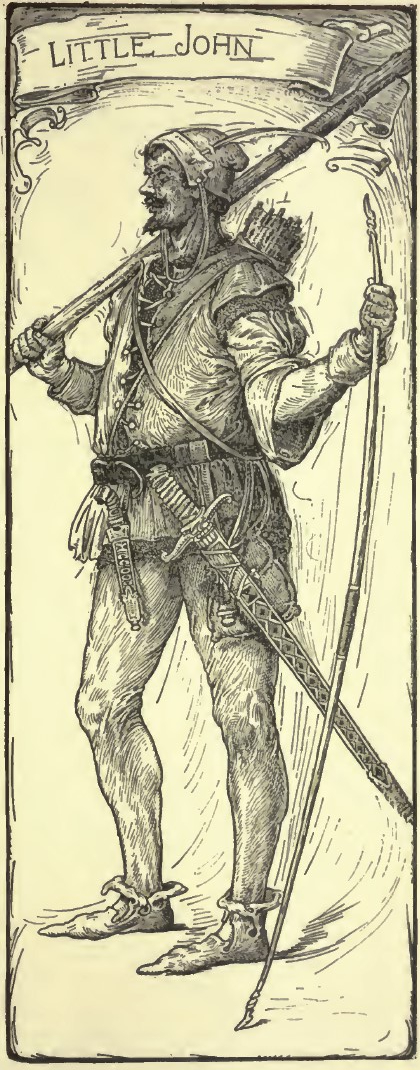
Little John. Sketch by Louis Rhead.

=== Fowler's reconstruction of narrative ballad history ===
As the Child Ballads were being prepared for publication, there was an ongoing debate among those who studied ballad origins. Those who considered that ballads originated as communal songs and dances were known as communalists; those who supported the opposing position, that ballads were written by individual authors, were known as individualists. This debate involved questions that have since been "discarded as subjects for fruitful inquiry". In other words, the question of communal versus individual origination can never be answered due to lack of historical evidence. The current consensus is that, since so little is known about the origins of the earliest ballads, their origins can only be deduced from clues within the texts themselves on a case-by-case basis. It was advocated by the English historian J. R. Maddicott in a series of articles in the journal Past & Present (1958–1961) and re-iterated in 1978.

In 1968, D. C. Fowler proposed a new reconstruction of the history of the narrative ballad, based upon his study of Gest, and the oldest Robin Hood ballads (Robin Hood and the Monk, and Robin Hood and the Potter). His proposal was that the narrative ballad is a subcategory of folksong that uses a narrative form. The narrative ballad, as it appeared in England during the 15th–16th centuries, was a result of the merger of several different traditions. The first tradition was folksong, which appeared about the 12th century, and became more widespread during the 13th–15th centuries with the appearance of carols and religious songs sung in the vernacular. The second tradition was itself the result of a 14th-century blending of the 12th century French courtly romances (such as the Arthurian romances) with the Old English alliterative traditional poetry to form a new genre of English metrical narrative romance (such as those included in the Ancient Engleish Metrical Romanceës). These romances are usually associated with royal court minstrels, but minstrels were also present at the great baronial halls of the north of England. These powerful barons, such as the House of Percy, the House of Neville, and the York and Lancaster cadet branches of the Plantagenet dynasty, maintained courts which rivalled the Royal Court in London.

Fowler's proposal was both opposed and applauded for his attempt to construct a history of ballads based upon the earliest dates of surviving texts and not upon comparative structure and form. Independent support for minstrel origins was offered by several historians. Maurice Keen, in his first edition (1961) of The Outlaws of Medieval Legend, argued that the ballad form of the Robin Hood stories indicated a primitive popular origin. In the Introduction to his second edition (1977), Keen stated that criticism forced him to abandon his original arguments He now supported the position that the narrative ballads were minstrel compositions. In 1989, James Holt also advocated a minstrel origin for the Robin Hood ballads when he proposed that the original audience was the yeoman servants of the English feudal households, especially those of Thomas, 2nd Earl of Lancaster, a grandson of Henry III. Holt proposed the ballads were then spread from the great halls to market-places, taverns and inns, where the common people heard them.

=== Sung or recited? ===
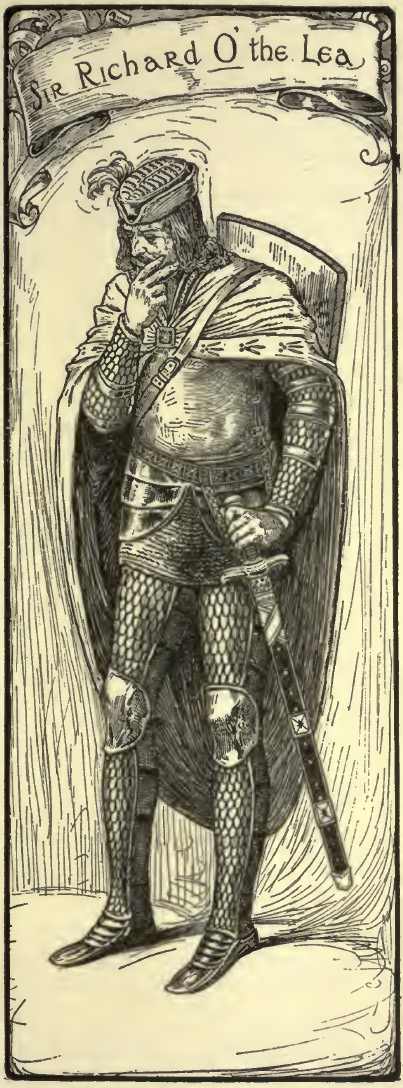
Sir Richard at the Lea. Sketch by Louis Rhead.

Fowler contended that the Robin Hood ballads were distinct from "true" ballads because they were recited, not sung. His evidence is twofold: (1) unrelated manuscripts, approximately from the same time at which Gest may have been compiled, which mention Robin Hood, and (2) internal passages from Gest and the two oldest Robin Hood ballads in manuscript form which are approximately contemporaneous with Gest: Robin Hood and the Monk, and Robin Hood and the Potter.

This interpretation of the contemporary manuscripts was originally proposed by Chambers, which Fowler incorporated into his hypothesis. The importance of the manuscripts is not only that they mentioned Robin Hood, but also what they said about him. The manuscripts are:

- Dives and Pauper (dated to ca 1410) refers to "tale or a song of robyn hode"

According to Fowler, the use of the words sing or song refers, not to the melodic singing of a folksong, but to a type of chanting known as plainsong. This view can be supported by one of the meanings of the Middle English singen ("to sing"): to relate a story in song or verse; to recite a poem.

- Scotichronicon (dated to ca 1450), written by Bower in Latin, uses the phrases "cantitare delectantur" and "recitantur" in its mention of Robin Hood and Little John in the then-popular "romanciis, mimos, ei bardanos"

cantitare delectantur loosely translated as "delightful singing" or
as "delightful recitation"
recitantur means as "reading aloud"
romanciis means "narratives, stories, or historical accounts"
mimos means "mimic plays"

In other words, Bower is talking about delightful stories about Robin Hood which are being performed in song and/or recitation.

- Historia Majoris Britanniae (dated 1521), written by Mair in Latin, contains a remark that the exploits of Robin Hood are known throughout England in "cantibus"

cantibus means "a singing tone in the delivery of an orator"

Perhaps "a singing tone" is not descriptive enough; it is rhythm, cadance, and word choice that makes a great orator. Churchill's second and third speeches delivered during the Battle of France, as well as Franklin Roosevelt's first inaugural address and Day of infamy address are examples from two of the masters of the radio address.

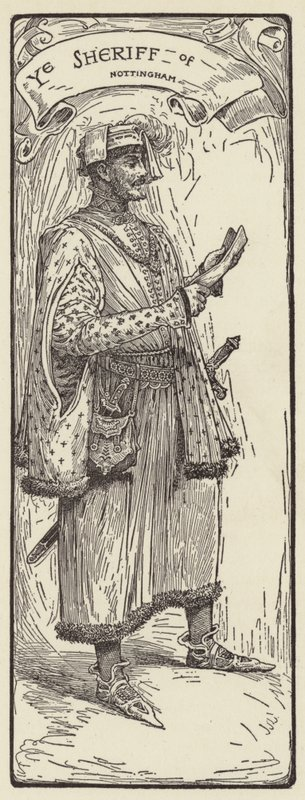
Sheriff of Nottingham. Sketch by Louis Rhead.

The internal evidence offered by Fowler consists of passages within the three ballads:

1. the use of speech verbs, such as speak, talk, and tell:
  - Robin Hood and the Potter contains the line "Now speak we of Roben Hode"
  - Robin Hood and the Monk ends with the line "Thus ends the talking of the monk/And Robyn Hode ..."
  - the opening stanza of Gest contains "I shall you tell of a good yeoman,"
2. the use of transitions
  - between Fyttes 1 and 2
  - at the beginning of Fytte 4
  - between the end of the Monk tale and resumption of the Sorrowful Knight tale in Fytte 4
3. the use of frequent asides to the audience

The most compelling internal evidence is the repeated use of the "Lythe and listen" formulaic. It is found:

- at the beginning of Fyttes 1, 3, 6
- in the second stanza of Fytte 5

"lythe" comes from Old Norse[U of MI's MED]. When used in the phrase "lythe and listen" it means "to hear, to be attentive" (as in the colloquialism "listen up!"). The Gest poet uses this formulaic whenever a new tale is about to begin. Considering the length of the ballad, it is possible that the ballad was broken up into sections for performance; and the "Lythe and listen" would alert the audience that the performance was about to resume.

=== Classification of Gest and other Robin Hood ballads ===
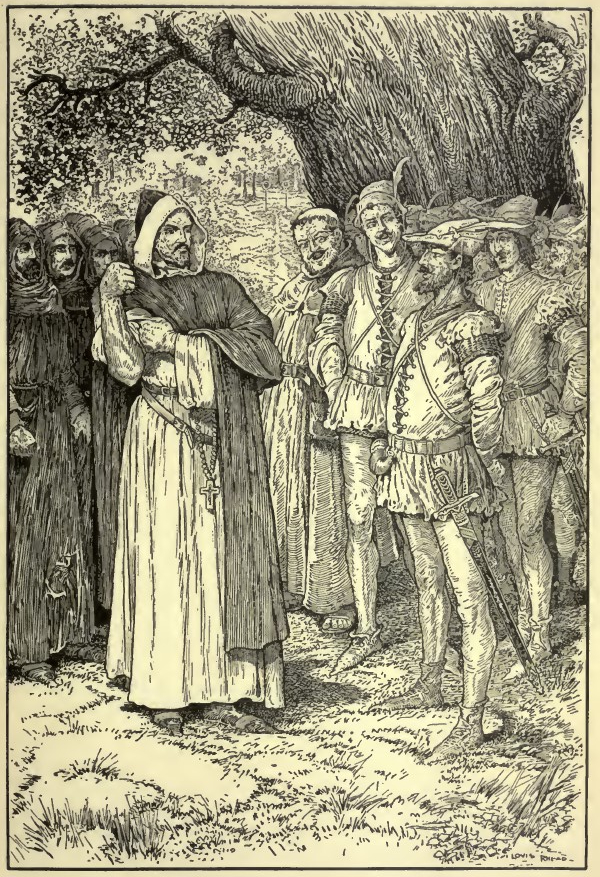
The King rolls up his sleeve. Sketch by Louis Rhead.

Scholars have discussed how best to classify Gest: is it a ballad, a poem, an epic or epic poem, a combination, a romance, or something else? Both Francis James Child and his successor George Lyman Kittredge gathered about themselves a group of students to continue the study of the Child ballads. Francis Barton Gummere was a student who assisted Child in compiling the ballads. Gummere later wrote two books which were based upon their collaboration: Old English Ballads and The Popular Ballad. In the latter book, Gummere described a classification scheme based upon the ballad structure and form.

Two other students of Kittredge expanded upon Gummere's classification scheme. Walter Morris Hart studied under Kittredge and later wrote Ballad and Epic. A Study in the Development of the Narrative Art. Hart examined ballads from each of Gummere's classes, and compared Gest to Beowulf and the Song of Roland. Hart looked more closely at the levels of elaboration and accretion, among ballads of the same class and between ballads of different classes. Elaboration (defined by Hart as growth from within) describes the differences in choral ballads and narrative ballads. As the narrative becomes more important, the characterisations, the surroundings, and the inter-relationships become more detailed. This increased level of detail allows for a more nuanced portrait of an individual's character, motives, and an understanding of their state of mind. Accretion (defined by Hart as the accumulation of independent events) is the complexity which arises in the narrative as the central character becomes a heroic figure, and represents the community's ideals. On the basis of its elaboration and accretion, Hart judged Gest as "an epic in the making". In Hart's opinion, Gest is surpassed only by the Danish and English heroic ballads, and Beowulf and Roland.

William Hall Clawson wrote his doctoral thesis on the Robin Hood ballads, which was later published as The Gest of Robin Hood. Prior to its publication, Clawson wrote an article, Ballad and Epic, which summarized his synthesis of the work done by Gummere and Hart. In 1974, J. B. Bessinger Jr., contending that the term "epic" was confusing, called Gest "a minor heroic poem" on the basis of his comparison of Gest with Havelok the Dane and The Tale of Gamelyn. Extending his comparison to the themes and content of Thomas Malory's Le Morte d'Arthur, Bessinger concluded that Gest lies somewhere between a ballad, epic, and a romance.

== Scholarship ==
Various scholars have written on Gest. The English and Scottish Popular Ballads, by Francis James Child, was very influential and popular in spreading knowledge of the oldest surviving ballads in English literature, although more evidence has been discovered since the late 1880s that Child did not have access to at the time. William Hall Clawson wrote extensively on Gest in 1909. Medievalist D. C. Fowler published A Literary History of the Popular Ballad in 1968. In 1989, historians Barrie Dobson and John Taylor wrote Rymes of Robyn Hood on the subject. In 1997, Stephen Knight and Thomas H. Ohlgren published Robin Hood and Other Outlaw Tales, a collection of all the pre–17th-century tales of Robin Hood, arranged in chronological order. Their book now forms the core of the Robin Hood Project of the University of Rochester's Middle English Texts website. In 2013, Ohlgren and linguist Lister M. Matheson published Early Rymes of Robin Hood, which includes "as-is" transcriptions of all the earliest surviving copies of Gest for use by scholars.

== Adaptations ==
Among early ballads, Robin Hood's Death is likely the most related, being a longer telling of the same story as the final six stanzas of Gest. Whether Death was an expansion of Gest, Gest an abridgment of Death, or both were based on a lost common source is impossible to say.

Various motifs in Gest reoccur in both contemporaneous ballads and later ones. Robin Hood robs a cleric in both Robin Hood and the Bishop and Robin Hood and the Bishop of Hereford; interacts with the king in a mostly friendly fashion in The King's Disguise, and Friendship with Robin Hood and many later stories; and gets involved in archery contests constantly.

With the rise of English Romanticism in the late 18th century came a resurgence in the popularity of the Robin Hood ballads. Gest was reprinted several times as part of various anthologies, the first of which was Robin Hood: A collection of all the Ancient Poems Songs and Ballads now extant, relative to that celebrated Outlaw, edited by Joseph Ritson in 1795 (followed by later editions in 1820, 1832 and 1885). Ivanhoe by Walter Scott was greatly influenced by Ritson's collection and likely an inspiration for the character of Locksley in it. Echoes from Gest can be found throughout Ivanhoe: in its various locations in the West Riding of Yorkshire; in the use of elements of Gest in key scenes at the Tournament of Ashby; and in Scott's re-use of the Gest poet's feasting scene motif to highlight important plot twists.

Gest has influenced modern versions of the Robin Hood tales, especially in the basic plot motifs such as Robin robbing someone and sharing the loot with another who is more worthy. However, its main stories are not always seen as much as the other Robin Hood ballads, most notably the story of The Sorrowful Knight. The adaption that bears obvious traces is the popular children's book written by Howard Pyle in 1883. Pyle's book was a huge influence on how Hollywood would later portray Robin Hood.

=== Howard Pyle's Merry Adventures ===
Howard Pyle's contribution to the Robin Hood revival of the 19th century was his richly illustrated children's book The Merry Adventures of Robin Hood. Following in the footsteps of Walter Scott, Pyle had Robin Hood roaming Sherwood Forest (not Barnsdale) during the reign of King Richard the Lionheart (not comely King Edward). Pyle did adapt the tale of the Sorrowful Knight, perhaps the most unique tale of Gest, in Chapters I–II of Part the Fifth of his work. The story is heavily modified from that in Gest (Pyle replaced most of Fytte 1 with his own version of how the Knight received his money; not from Robin, but from the Bishop of Hereford, who "conveniently" came to Robin's feast). Writing in an era of it being cheap to write in longform, Pyle extended the story with richly detailed descriptions and drawings, while the compiler of Gest, needing to make something short and punchy enough to potentially be recited by a minstrel, was more spare in his prose.

He was a good stout knight, but sorrowful of face and downcast of mien. His clothes were plain and rich, but no chain of gold, such as folk of his stand in life wore at most times, hung around his neck, and no jewel was about him; yet no one could mistake him for aught but one of proud and noble blood. His head was bowed upon his breast and his hands drooped limp on either side; and so he came slowly riding, as though sunk in sad thoughts, whilst even his good horse, the reins loose upon his neck, walked with hanging head, as though he shared his master's grief.

All dreary was his semblance,
And little was his pride;
His one foot in the stirrup stood,
That other waved beside.

His hood hanged in his eyes two;
He rode in simple array,
A sorrier man than he was one
Rode never in summer day."

— The Merry Adventures of Robin Hood (left) Gest, Fytte 1 (right)

Pyle also includes the episode of the wrestling yeoman, but to tie it more clearly into the novel, he made the man David of Doncaster, a Merry Man from Robin Hood and the Golden Arrow, though even this made the episode odd among Pyle's novelistic effects.
