= Bishop of Hereford (Robin Hood) =

Character in the Robin Hood legend

The Bishop of Hereford is a character in the Robin Hood legend. He is typically portrayed as a wealthy and greedy clergyman who is robbed by Robin and his Merry Men.

== History ==
The character first appears by this name in the ballad "Robin Hood and the Bishop of Hereford". The earliest surviving text is in the Forresters manuscript (British Library Add MS 71158), which dates to the 1670s. Relying on later printed versions, Francis James Child collected the work as Child Ballad 144. In the song, Robin Hood and some of his men, disguised as shepherds, poach a deer in an area where they know the Bishop of Hereford will pass through. Finding them, the Bishop threatens to bring them before King Richard, and refuses to grant them pardon. Robin summons his Merry Men, who capture the Bishop and force him to "pay for" a feast with the outlaws and to sing a mass for them. Child regarded it as "far superior to most of the seventeenth-century broadsides".

The work is related to Child Ballad 143, "Robin Hood and the Bishop", which features an unidentified bishop and ends in a nearly identical way. Both are variants of the episode in the much older "Gest of Robyn Hode" in which Robin robs a monk. The Bishop of Hereford appears in the subsequent Child Ballad, "Robin Hood and Queen Katherine", in which he refers to the action in the previous work and refuses to bet on Robin in an archery contest.

Scholar Stephen Knight notes that there are multiple historical Bishops of Hereford who have been suggested as a model for the character in the ballads. He may have been based on Adam Orleton, Bishop from 1317 to 1327, an antagonist of Edward II of England who became very unpopular during the reign of Edward III. He was a well-known figure at the time the earliest Robin Hood ballads likely developed in the 14th century. Another suggestion is the famously corrupt Peter of Aigueblanche, Bishop of Hereford from 1240 to 1268. However, he would have been much less well known in the 14th century. As the ballad identifies the sitting king as Richard, the contemporary bishop William de Vere, in office from 1186 until his death in 1198, has also been suggested, but Knight regards this as unlikely.

The Bishop of Hereford appears in Howard Pyle's influential children's book The Merry Adventures of Robin Hood (1883), based on the medieval ballads. The Merry Men rob him to pay Sir Richard at the Lee's debt. Later, he is scheduled to perform the marriage of Alan-a-Dale's sweetheart to her unwanted wooer, until Robin intervenes. He also appears in the archery contest scene, where the Queen (here Eleanor of Aquitaine) attributes his refusal to bet on Robin more to greed than to the impropriety of his betting. The Hereford Bishop appears in the anime series Robin Hood no Daibōken voiced by Yuu Shimaka, and is portrayed as a greedy bishop of Nottingham and ally to Baron Alwyn (the main antagonist) who desires Marian Lancaster for the Lancaster's wealth; however, he later betrays the Baron near the end and joins with Robin and his friends to overthrow his unstable leader.

The role of the Bishop of Hereford was played by Harold Innocent in the 1991 film Robin Hood: Prince of Thieves. In this version, he is depicted as a corrupt clergyman who supports the Sheriff and insists to Robin that the latter's father admitted to being a devil-worshiper. This culminates in Friar Tuck, disgusted and enraged at the Bishop's corruption and hypocrisy, shoving him out of a window to his death.

== Popular culture ==
The Bishop of Hereford appears in the 2025 Robin Hood TV series, portrayed by Richard Lintern.
