= Friar Tuck =

Character from the Robin Hood folklore

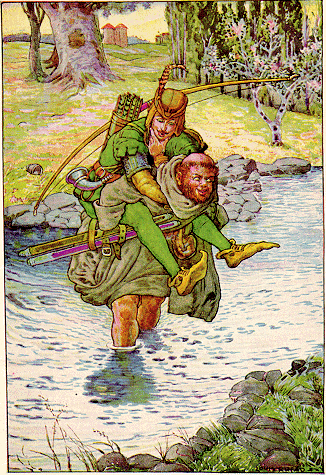
- "The friar took Robin on his back" Illustration by Louis Rhead to Bold Robin Hood and His Outlaw Band: Their Famous Exploits in Sherwood Forest
- Born: 15th-century
- Died: 15th-century
- Known for: Member of Robin Hood's Merry Men

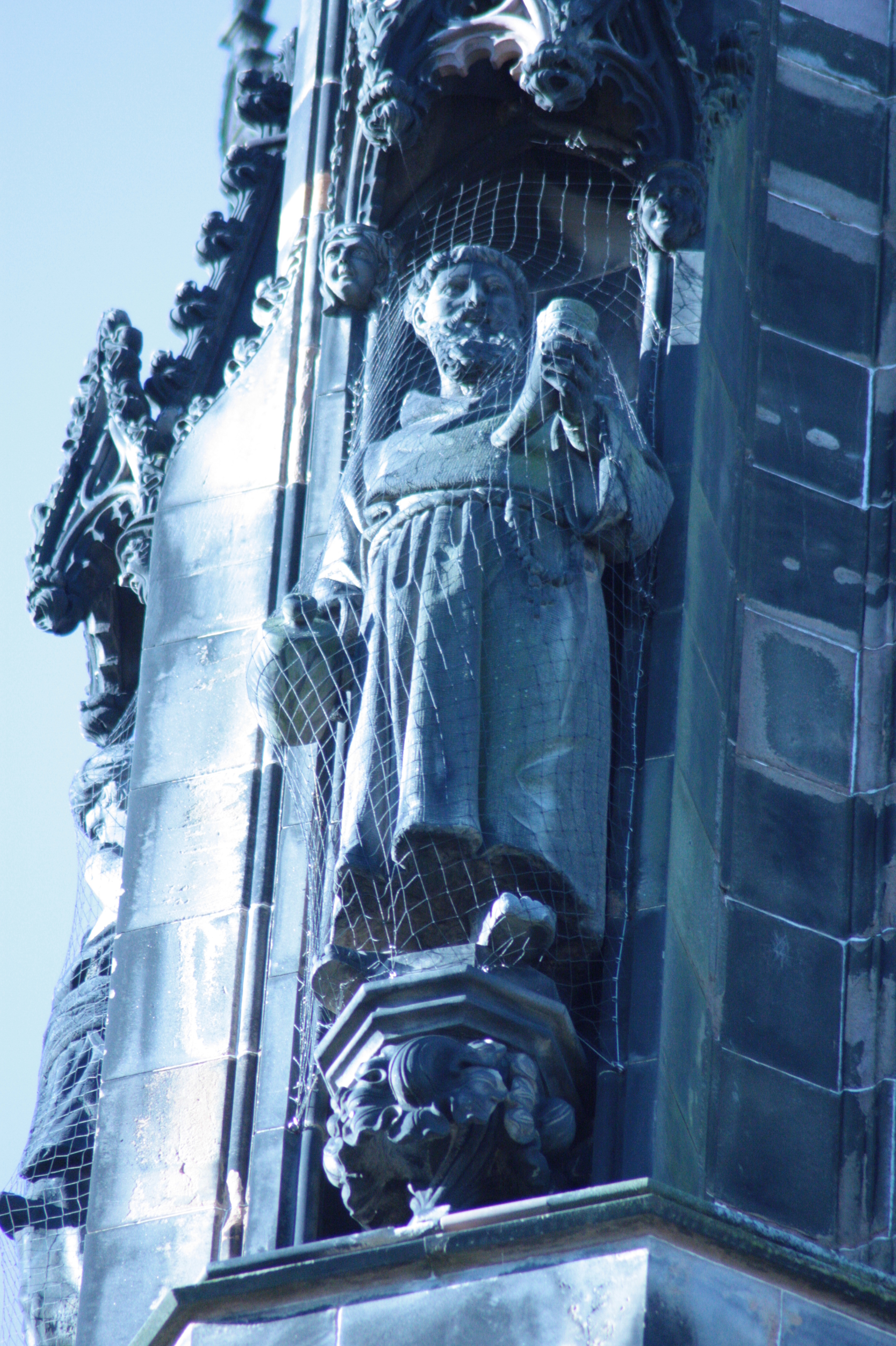
Figure of Friar Tuck, Scott Monument, Edinburgh, by George Clark Stanton

Friar Tuck is one of the Merry Men, the band of heroic outlaws in the folklore of Robin Hood. Although a common character in the modern Robin Hood legend, Tuck does not appear in the earliest surviving Robin Hood ballads.

== History ==
The figure of the jovial friar was common in the May Games festivals of England and Scotland during the 15th to 17th centuries. Friar figures also appear in morris dances associated with May Day celebrations of the period. The original association of Friar Tuck with Robin Hood remains uncertain and may have emerged through morris tradition, dramatic performance, or both. He appears as a character in the play Robyn Hod and the Shryff off Notyngham (which has survived in a fragmentary manuscript dated to c. 1475), and also in a play for the May games published in 1560 which tells a story similar to "Robin Hood and the Curtal Friar" (the oldest surviving copy of this ballad is from the 17th century). The character likely entered the tradition through these folk plays, and he was often associated with Maid Marian, who was also a May Games character. By the mid 16th century May Games were becoming increasingly bawdy, and in one play Robin even gives Marian to Friar Tuck as a concubine: "She is a trul of trust, to serue a frier at his lust/a prycker a prauncer a terer of shetes/a wagger of ballockes when other men slepes." His appearance in Robyn Hod and the Shryff off Notyngham shows that he was already part of the legend around the time when the earliest surviving copies of the Robin Hood ballads were being made.

A friar with Robin's band in the historical period of Richard the Lion-Hearted would have been unlikely as the period predates formal mendicant orders in England. Nonetheless, hermits in England date as far back as Cuthbert in the late 7th century, and monasticism was present as early as the 5th century. In addition, multiple historical references to hermits unallied with formal orders have been noted, among them Eustace the Monk (a medieval outlaw) and Robert of Knaresborough who was a contemporary of Richard I. However, the association of Robin Hood with Richard I was not made until the 16th century; the early ballad "A Gest of Robin Hood" names his king as "Edward".

What follows is a story which includes different versions of the legend. He was a former monk of Fountains Abbey (or in some cases, St Mary's Abbey in York, which is also the scene of some other Robin Hood tales) who was expelled by his order because of his lack of respect for authority. Because of this, and in spite of his taste for good food and wine, he became the chaplain of Robin's band. In Howard Pyle's The Merry Adventures of Robin Hood, he was specifically sought out as part of the tale of Alan-a-Dale: Robin has need of a priest who will marry Allan to his sweetheart in defiance of the Bishop of Hereford.

In many tales, from Robin Hood and the Curtal Friar to The Merry Adventures of Robin Hood, his first encounter with Robin results in a battle of wits in which first one and then the other gains the upper hand and forces the other to carry him across a river. This ends with the Friar tossing Robin into the river.

In some tales, he is depicted as a physically fit man and a skilled swordsman and archer with a hot-headed temper. However, most commonly, Tuck is depicted as a fat, balding monk with a good sense of humour and a great love of food and ale, often together. Sometimes, the latter depiction of Tuck is the comic relief of the tale.

Two royal writs in 1417 refer to Robert Stafford, a Sussex chaplain who had assumed the alias of Frere Tuk. This "Friar Tuck" was still at large in 1429. These are the earliest surviving references to a character by that name.

== Portrayals in other media ==
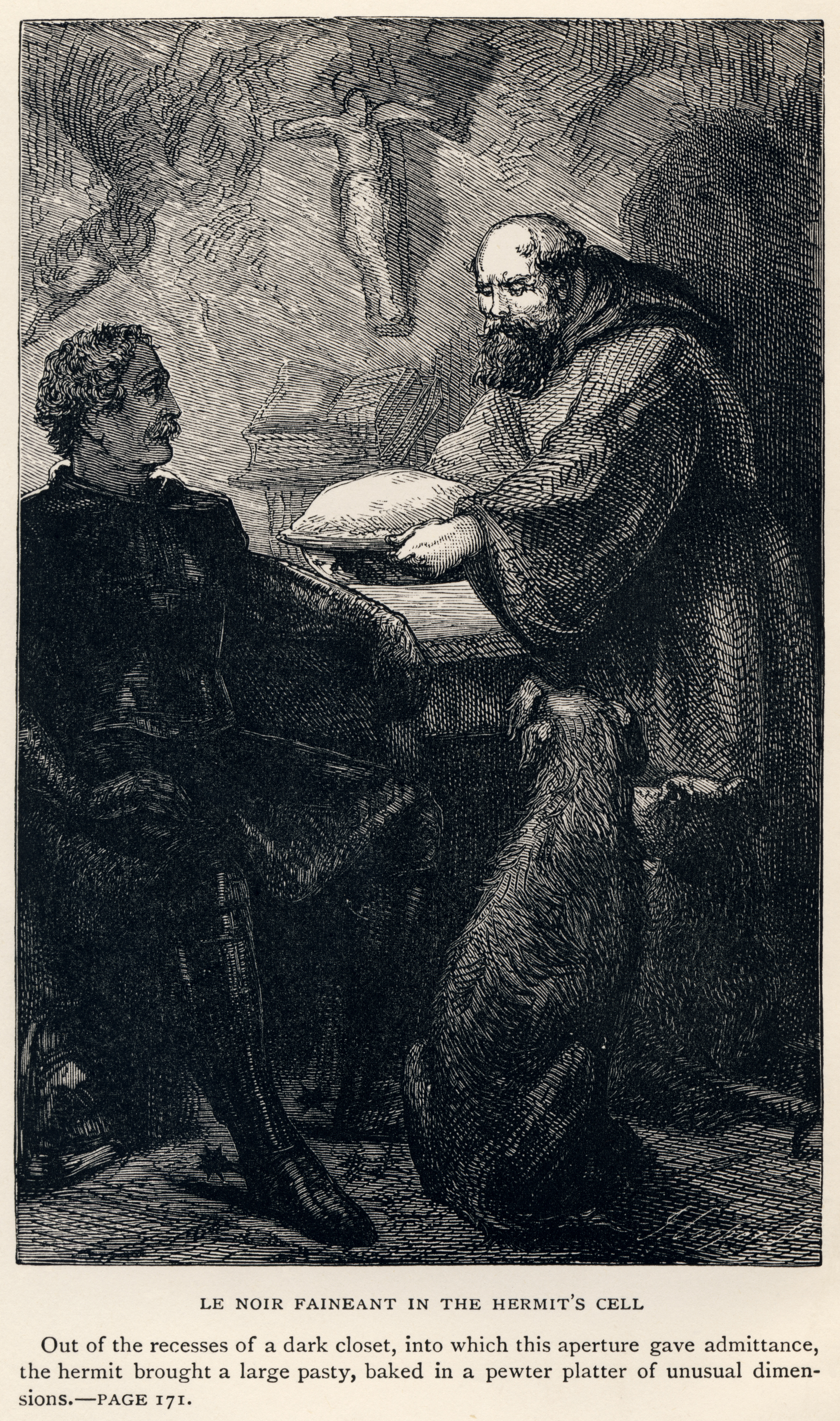
Friar Tuck meets the disguised Richard the Lionheart in Sir Walter Scott's Ivanhoe.

Friar Tuck has been featured in numerous adaptations across stage, film, television, animation, video games, and literature. These portrayals have varied in characterization and style, but commonly emphasize his loyalty, humor, and defiance in the face of authority. Notably, there are numerous instances where Tuck is referenced not in relation to Robin Hood.

Title	Year	Portrayed by	Media Type
Ivanhoe	1891	Avon Saxon	Romantic opera
Douglas Fairbanks in Robin Hood	1922	Willard Louis	Film
The Adventures of Robin Hood	1938	Eugene Pallette	Film
The Bandit of Sherwood Forest	1946	Edgar Buchanan	Film
The Prince of Thieves	1948	Alan Mowbray	Film
Rogues of Sherwood Forest	1950	Billy House	Film
The Adventures of Robin Hood	1955–1959	Alexander Gauge	TV series
The Story of Robin Hood and His Merrie Men	1952	James Hayter	Film
Robin Hood Daffy	1958	Porky Pig	Animated short
A Challenge for Robin Hood	1967	James Hayter	Film
Robin Hood	1973	Andy Devine	Animated film
When Things Were Rotten	1975	Dick Van Patten	TV series
Robin of Sherwood	1980s	Phil Rose	TV series
Robin Hood no Daibōken	1990–1991	Kenichi Ogata	Anime series
Young Robin Hood	1991	Harry Standjofski	Animated series
Robin Hood: Prince of Thieves	1991	Mike McShane	Film
Robin Hood	1991	Jeff Nuttall	Film
Star Trek: TNG: "Qpid"	1991	Brent Spiner (Data)	TV series
Robin Hood: Men in Tights	1993	Mel Brooks	Film
Robin Hood	2009	David Harewood	TV series
Robin Hood	2010	Mark Addy	Film
Once Upon a Time	2014–2016	Michael P. Northey	TV series
Doctor Who: "Robot of Sherwood"	2014	Trevor Cooper	TV series
Robin Hood	2018	Tim Minchin	Film

== Analysis ==
Anne K. Kaler noted that a common misconception about Friar Tuck is that he was a Franciscan friar; she noted this is not plausible as he could belong to Benedictine, Augustinian or Carmelite orders instead, or perhaps be a renegade monk or a hermit. She notes that he fits into the Robin Hood story as one of the classic archetypes or stereotypes; here, of "a laudatory example of Christian clergyman", remembered for qualities such as "joy and good fellowship", a role for which he became immortalized in popular culture since. She compared him to characters such as Santa Claus, Falstaff or Winnie the Pooh, calling him "our 'belly cheer', our Lord of Misrule, our occasional defiance of authority, our spirit of seasonal joy".

== Medical references ==
A pattern in the dermatologic disease trichotillomania (compulsive pulling out of scalp hair) has been nicknamed the "Friar Tuck sign" because of its resemblance to Friar Tuck's familiar tonsured hair, which was common in many male religious orders in the mediaeval period.
