= King Edward the Fourth and a Tanner of Tamworth =

Traditional song

King Edward the Fourth and a Tanner of Tamworth (Roud 248, Child 273) is an English-language folk song, first published in 1564. Versions of this ballad also exist outside the Child collection. Additional copies can be found at the British Library, the University of Glasgow Library, and the Pepys Library at Magdalene College. These ballads' dates, by estimation of the English Short Title Catalogue, range from the early seventeenth century to as late as 1775. The ballad is most recognized by its opening line: "In summer time, when leaves grow green." Child describes the appeal of this ballad to be centered on the chance meeting with a king, which is also a recurring theme in tales of Robin Hood.

== Synopsis ==
King Edward, while hunting, espies a tanner riding a mare with a cowhide for a saddle. He tells his men to stay back and goes to ask directions to the town of Drayton Bassett. The tanner offers wrong directions, but Edward knows them to be wrong; then Edward invites the tanner to dine with him in Drayton Bassett. The tanner responds that he has no need of charity; he has more pounds in his purse than the stranger has pence in his. Furthermore, he suspects the stranger of having stolen the lordly raiment he is wearing.

Edward asks the tanner for news. The tanner replies that he has heard nothing save that cowhides are in great demand. Edward then asks to switch horses with the tanner. The tanner replies that he'll do the trade but only for a gold noble (80d). Edward, amused, gives him twenty groats (80d), which raises the tanner's opinion of him a bit. The tanner hands over his mare, throws the cowhide over the king's gilt saddle, and tries to ride home; but the cowhide spooks the king's steed and it throws the tanner onto the ground.

The tanner indignantly demands his mare back. Edward, laughing, replies that he'll do the trade but only for a gold noble. The tanner graciously hands Edward not only his original twenty groats but also twenty more, and invites him to share a drink.

Edward then summons his hunting party from over the hill. The tanner first takes them for a band of outlaws, and then (when he realizes Edward's true identity) trembles in fear of royal punishment; but Edward instead thanks the tanner for his entertainment and for his hospitality, and bestows on him Plumpton Park with its three tenements, worth 300 pounds a year. The tanner, not to be outdone, tells Edward that if the king should ever visit his little shop in Tamworth, he can have his shoes re-leathered for free.

Tune
Though no specific tune is listed on any of the ballads—instead it reads: "To an Excellent new Tune"—it is likely the ballad was sung to the tune "In Summer Time," which, again, was also often set to Robin Hood ballads.

== Notes ==
Plumpton Park is also mentioned in A Gest of Robyn Hode (Child ballad 117) as a place that Edward (in this case, likely Edward II) would go to hunt. Various historians place Robin Hood's Plumpton Park within Inglewood Forest or within the Forest of Knaresborough.
