= Robin Hood (1990 TV series) =

Italian-Japanese anime

- German DVD cover
- ロビンフッドの大冒険
- Directed by: Kōichi Mashimo
- Music by: Yasunori Iwasaki
- Countries of origin: Japan; Italy
- Original language: Japanese
- No. of episodes: 52

Production
- Executive producers: Kenichi Murakami; Hideo Ihara
- Producers: Ippei Kuri; Kouki Narushima; Masaaki Motomura
- Animator: Tatsunoko Production
- Production companies: NHK; Mondo TV

Original release
- Network: NHK-BS2 (Japan)
- Release: July 28, 1990 – October 28, 1991
- Network: Canale 5 (Italy)
- Release: December 23, 1991 – December 23, 1992

Robin Hood (ロビンフッドの大冒険, Robin Fuddo no Daibōken, lit. "Robin Hood's Great Adventure") is a Japanese-Italian anime series produced by Tatsunoko Production, Mondo TV and NHK. In "Robin Hood's Great Adventure", Robin and his allies are mostly pre-teens.

The series is based on Alexandre Dumas' translations of Pierce Egan the Younger's Robin Hood and Little John (1838).

== Plot ==
Robin's palace is burned to ashes by the order of Alwyn, the Baron of Nottingham. Robin and his cousins Will, Winifred and Jenny flee into the Sherwood Forest, hoping to escape persecution. At the Sherwood Forest, they meet and befriend other bandits led by Little John, who dubs himself Big John early in the series. Together, Robin and the bandits must stop Baron Alwyn's persecutions and greed, as well as to prevent the greedy and fat Bishop Hartford from adopting (marrying, in the Japanese version) Marian Lancaster and obtaining her family's wealth.

== Characters ==
=== Protagonists ===
- Robert Huntington, aka Robin Hood (voiced by Kazue Ikura) – The heir to the noble family of Huntington, he is forced to flee and hide at the Sherwood Forest when his home is burnt down and his parents assassinated. In the forest, he and his cousins meet Little John and his gang. Robin is an archer. Twice throughout the series, he shoots an apple from a long distance. In most episodes, there is a showy scene of Robin arming and drawing his bow, firing a decisive shot. The outcome of the decisive shot varies by episodes, ranging from spectacular embarrassment to epic success. Robin is not particularly bright. The series' favorite method of helping Robin out of his predicament is the deus ex machina device.
- Marian Lancaster (voiced by Naoko Matsui) – The descendant of the noble Lancaster family, she is to be adopted by the greedy bishop Hartford. She wears a golden, cross-shaped pendant that bears that symbol of her family and was her mother's prized possession. The pendant often precipitates supernatural phenomena. Marian is especially notable throughout the series for her character development.
- Will Scarlet (voiced by Yuko Mita), Robin's sidekick who has two sisters
- Friar Tuck (voiced by Kenichi Ogata) – An old monk, he lives on the edge of the Sherwood Forest and helps Robin to whatever meager extent he can. A recurring gag is Friar Tuck's repeated attempts at inventing flying machines that don't work.
- Little John (voiced by Bin Shimada) – The leader of a group of bandits, who were forced to hide out in Sherwood Forest to avoid forced labor, he has a love interest in Winifred. He is not a reliable ally because of his temperament, but Robin does not have the luxury of choosing his allies.
- Much (voiced by Mayumi Tanaka), Little John's right-hand man
- Winifred Scarlet (voiced by Maria Kawamura), Robin's cousin and Will's older sister
- Jenny Scarlet, (Barbara in the Japanese version, voiced by Sayuri Iketmoto), Robin's cousin, and Will's younger sister
- King Richard the Lionheart (voiced by Mugihito), the king of England

=== Antagonists and supporting characters ===
The 1990 edition of Robin Hood has flipping antagonists into Robin's supporters.

- Baron Alwyn (voiced by Masashi Ebara) – The ruthless and greedy, but nonetheless ingenious and crafty Baron of Nottingham is the arch-villain of the series. He is based on the Sheriff of Nottingham in both character design and personality. He orders the assassination of Robin's parents and the destruction of the Huntington's castle. He has a passion for creating fantastic siege engines and deadly contraptions. After a near-death experience in the second half of the series, he has a brief change of heart, but reverts when an opportunity to take over the kingdom presents itself.
- Bishop Hartford (voiced by Yuu Shimaka) – A greedy bishop of Nottingham, he tries to adopt Marian Lancaster for the Lancaster's wealth. He eventually makes a change for the better towards the end of the series, and helps out Robin by informing them of Alwyn's plot to take over the kingdom.
- Gilbert (voiced by Toshihiko Seki) – A skilled, ruthless knight of the realm who the follows a strict code of chivalry. He's the leader of an unnamed knightly order, whose insignia is a black rose. (Other knights of the order later make an appearance.) Although he does not serve the local Baron, Alwyn tricks him into going after Robin. The boy's arrow scars Gilbert's face, prompting him to hunt the boy for most of the series, demanding satisfaction. Presence of Marian, however, complicates matters. The code mandates the knight to hold her in equal esteem as the Baron, and render her aid when she is in distress. Gilbert tries to prevent her from falling into a ravine, ends up falling himself, and is presumed dead. He survives and returns to challenge Robin later. He gives up his vendetta when Marian's magic heals his scar. Later, he is shown to serve King Richard. Overall, every encounter with the knight goes badly for Robin.
- Cleo (voiced by Chieko Honda) – Gilbert's sister, first introduced in episode #24 of 52, "The Girl in Black", long after the presumed death of Gilbert. She has long, dark hair, prefers black attire, and has replaced Gilbert as the leader of their knightly order. Alwyn frames Robin for the "murder" of Gilbert, tricking Cleo into going after the boy in revenge. She summons the rest of her knightly order. Seeing it, Bishop Hartford comments that Gilbert proved more useful in death than in living. The order eventually stumble upon the truth, but too late to be of any help for Robin. They depart with a cordial goodbye.
- King John (voiced by Issei Futamata) – Eager to usurp his brother's rule, he becomes a pawn in Alwyn's schemes for power.
- Guy of Gisbourne – A mercenary hired by Alwyn to kill Robin, he appears in one episode only. He and his two sidekicks, The Viking and Hood, capture Robin Hood and his friends. Then, they proceed to eat mushrooms that Winifred and Jenny have collected. What they eat, however, mostly consists of Laughing Cap Toadstools, which induces unstoppable laughter, disabling them. Much, who has evaded their capture, frees Robin and other captives.

== Music ==
The series uses two pieces of theme music for the Japanese version; one opening song and one ending song. The Japanese opening song is called "Wood Walker", and the Japanese ending song is called "Hoshizora no Labirinsu (星空のラビリンス lit.Labyrinth of the Starry Sky)", both sing by the Japanese vocalist Satoko Shimonari.

There are two English opening songs. One is called "Robin of the Forest", while another is an instrumental of "Wood Walker" used for Interfilm's video dub. The Italian dub, called simply Robin Hood, features an opening theme with words by Alessandra Valeri Manera and music by Carmelo "Ninni" Carucci, sung by the popular singer Cristina D'Avena; the French dub, called Les Adventures de Robin des Bois, uses the same tune sung by Alexis Tomassian. All the opening animations are kept the same, however, the ending animation differs depending on the international versions, for example, the Japanese ending is completely original whereas the German dub shows scenes from the series to a shortened instrumental theme of their composed opening.

== Episodes ==
1. "Birth of the Hero"
2. "Mystery Forest"
3. "A Duel"
4. "House Building"
5. "The Mercenary"
6. "Gentlemen Bandits"
7. "The Loyal King"
8. "Towards Nottingham"
9. "Friend or Foe"
10. "Impossible"
11. "An Uncertain Future"
12. "Disguise"
13. "Up in Smoke"
14. "A New Day"
15. "An Unexpected Return"
16. "Fog and Wind"
17. "The Ultimate Farewell"
18. "Tuck's Battle"
19. "Witchcraft"
20. "Revenge"
21. "King of the Forest"
22. "Fire"
23. "Thunderstorm in Nottingham"
24. "The Girl in Black"
25. "Love and Hate"
26. "Peace After the Storm"
27. "A Foundling"
28. "The Flying Ship"
29. "A Prediction"
30. "Barons Greed"
31. "The Bandits Revenge"
32. "Jenny's Tale"
33. "Return"
34. "The Fog of Revenge"
35. "The Good Old Days"
36. "Gamekeeper"
37. "Fire in the Forest"
38. "The Treasury"
39. "Reconciliation"
40. "An Evil Being"
41. "Traitor"
42. "The Lake of Truth"
43. "The Decisive Battle"
44. "The Bad Luck Man"
45. "A Charming Villain"
46. "Unbeatable"
47. "Honest Eyes"
48. "Tragedy"
49. "Prince of the Woods"
50. "The Decision"
51. "The Crowning"
52. "Immortal"

== See also ==
- List of films and television series featuring Robin Hood
