= Robin Hood and the Bishop of Hereford =

Traditional song

Robin Hood and the Bishop of Hereford is Child ballad 144 (Roud 2338).

== Synopsis ==
Robin Hood, knowing the bishop is coming, has his men kill a deer, puts shepherd's clothing on himself and six others, and dresses the deer by the road. The bishop threatens to have them all hanged. Robin summons the rest of his men with his horn, compels the bishop to dine with them, and either robs him or forces him to say mass for them.

== Early publication ==
This ballad was published as a broadside by C. Shepherd, of London, in 1791. It was included in A Collection of National English Airs, edited by William Chappell and published in 1840.

== See also ==
- Robin Hood and the Bishop
- List of the Child Ballads
