= Robin Hood and the Bishop =

Traditional song

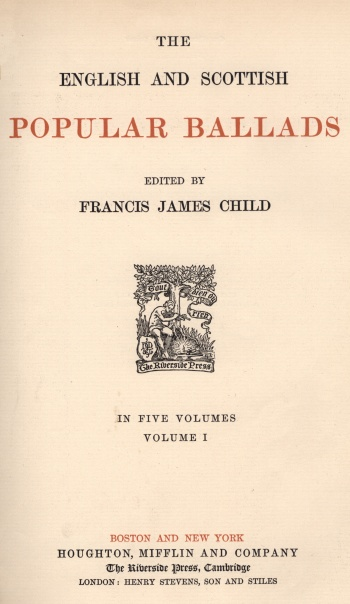
Cover of 1904 edition of Child’s English and Scottish Popular Ballads

Robin Hood and the Bishop (Roud 3955, Child 143) is an English-language folk song describing an adventure of Robin Hood. This song has also survived as a late seventeenth-century English broadside ballad, and is one of several ballads about the medieval folk hero that form part of the Child ballad collection, which is one of the most comprehensive collections of traditional English ballads.

== Synopsis ==
One sunny day, Robin Hood is walking through the forest in search of diversion when he notices a proud bishop with his company. Away from his men, Robin is frightened that the Bishop will hang him if he sees and catches him. He looks about and sees an old woman's house; he approaches and appeals to her for aid. Because he has previously given her a gift of both shoes and socks, she willingly agrees to help him hide from the Bishop and his men by exchanging her grey coat, spindle, and twine for his green mantle and arrows. Then Robin sets out to find his men; Little John sees him from a distance, thinks he is a witch, and is about to let fly an arrow at him, but Robin quickly reveals his identity. Meanwhile, the Bishop has gone to the old woman's house, and catches her there, believing her to be Robin; they ride away through the forest on horseback. But up ahead they sight a hundred bow-men gathered under a great green-wood tree, and, to the Bishop's shock and dismay, the old woman identifies them as Robin Hood and his men and herself as an old woman. Before the Bishop can flee, Robin calls him to stay, grabs his horse by the reins, and ties it to a tree. He then empties the Bishop's five hundred pounds into his mantle and is about to let him go when Little John demands that the Bishop say Mass for them. Robin and his men tie the Bishop to a tree, force him to say Mass, and then set him back on his horse with the sarcastic command that he pray for Robin.

== Historical and cultural significance ==
This ballad is part of a group of ballads about Robin Hood that in turn, like many of the popular ballads collected by Francis James Child, were in their time considered a threat to the Protestant religion. Puritan writers, like Edward Dering writing in 1572, considered such tales "'childish follye'" and "'witless devices.'" Writing of the Robin Hood ballads after A Gest of Robyn Hode, their Victorian collector Francis Child claimed that variations on the "'Robin met with his match'" theme, such as this ballad, are "sometimes wearisome, sometimes sickening," and that "a considerable part of the Robin Hood poetry looks like char-work done for the petty press, and should be judged as such." Child had also called the Roxburghe and Pepys collections (in which some of these ballads are included) "'veritable dung-hills [...], in which only after a great deal of sickening grubbing, one finds a very moderate jewel.'" However, as folklorist and ethnomusicologist Mary Ellen Brown has pointed out, Child's denigration of the later Robin Hood ballads is evidence of an ideological view he shared with many other scholars of his time who wanted to exclude cheap printed ballads such as these from their pedigree of the oral tradition and early literature. Child and others were reluctant to include such broadsides in their collections because they thought they "regularized the text, rather than reflecting and/or participating in tradition, which fostered multiformity." On the other hand, the broadsides are significant in themselves as showing, as English jurist and legal scholar John Selden (1584–1654) puts it, "'how the wind sits. As take a straw and throw it up in the air; you shall see by that which way the wind is, which you shall not do by casting up a stone. More solid things do not show the complexion of the times so well as ballads and libels.'" Even though the broadsides are cultural ephemera, unlike weightier tomes, they are important because they are markers of contemporary "current events and popular trends." It has been speculated that in his time Robin Hood represented a figure of peasant revolt, but the English medieval historian J. C. Holt has argued that the tales developed among the gentry, that he is a yeoman rather than a peasant, and that the tales do not mention peasants' complaints, such as oppressive taxes. Moreover, he does not seem to rebel against societal standards but to uphold them by being munificent, devout, and affable. Other scholars have seen the literature around Robin Hood as reflecting the interests of the common people against feudalism. The latter interpretation supports Selden's view that popular ballads provide a valuable window onto the thoughts and feelings of the common people on topical matters: for the peasantry, Robin Hood may have been a redemptive figure.

== Library/archival holdings ==
The English Broadside Ballad Archive at the University of California, Santa Barbara holds four seventeenth-century broadside ballad versions of this tale: one in the Euing collection at the Glasgow University Library (303), two in the Pepys collection at Magdalene College at the University of Cambridge (2.109 and 2.122), and one in the Roxburghe ballad collection at the British Library (1.362-363).

== See also ==
- Robin Hood and the Bishop of Hereford
