= Listed buildings in Brighouse =

Brighouse is a town and an unparished area in the metropolitan borough of Calderdale, West Yorkshire, England. It contains 71 listed buildings that are recorded in the National Heritage List for England. Of these, two are listed at Grade I, the highest of the three grades, six are at Grade II*, the middle grade, and the others are at Grade II, the lowest grade. This list contains the listed buildings in Brighouse Ward which, in addition to the town of Brighouse, contains the village of Clifton and the surrounding countryside, in particular to the west and the southeast of the town along the valley of the River Calder. Historically, one of the most important buildings in the area was Kirklees Priory, which has been demolished, but listed buildings associated with it remain, in particular farm buildings in Home Farm and a gatehouse. In addition to the River Calder, the Calder and Hebble Navigation runs through the area, and listed buildings associated with the two waterways include bridges, locks, lock keepers' houses, a warehouse, and a milestone. The other listed buildings include houses and associated structures, cottages, farmhouses and farm buildings, shops and offices, churches and chapels, two graves, a sundial, a former mill, a former school, civic buildings, banks, a railway bridge, road milestones, a boundary stone, a folly, and a war memorial.

== Key ==
Grade	Criteria
I	Buildings of exceptional interest, sometimes considered to be internationally important
II*	Particularly important buildings of more than special interest
II	Buildings of national importance and special interest

== Buildings ==
Name and location	Photograph	Date	Notes	Grade
The Nuns Grave; 53.69520°N 1.73591°W	—	Medieval	Two table tombs, one a medieval slab with an engraved crucifix, the other an inscribed slab from the 18th century. They are surrounded by octagonal tapered stone columns with pointed caps and the remains of iron railings.	II
1 and 3 Upper Green Lane; 53.71511°N 1.79680°W	—	Late Medieval	Formerly Netherhouse, the house has a timber framed core, and it was later encased in stone. The house has a stone slate roof, two storeys and three bays. In the middle bay is a 16-light mullioned and transomed window and a four-light fire window, and the other windows have altered glazing. Above the ground floor windows are slate hood moulds, and under the eaves is a string course of diagonally-set slates. Inside there is exposed timber framing.	II*
Double-aisled barn, Home Farm; 53.69541°N 1.73743°W		15th century	The barn is double-aisled with a timber framed core, external walls in stone and a stone slate roof. There are six bays with cross-wings added in about 1620. It has a later gabled porch, a square-headed entry, and a gabled wing, originally a dovecote. Added to the east is a stable block with quoins, a coped gable and kneelers. There are two storeys and a loft, with stabling in the ground floor, a hay loft above, and living accommodation over that. It contains mullioned windows with hood moulds, a doorway with composite jambs and a Tudor arched lintel with spandrels, and a pitching hole.	I
L-shaped aisled barn, Home Farm; 53.69592°N 1.73727°W	—	Early 16th century	The timber framed barn was encased in stone in the 17th century, and it has a stone slate hipped roof. There are two ranges, the main range with 5½ bays, and a cross-wing of two bays with an aisle.	II*
Kirklees Priory Gatehouse; 53.69517°N 1.73725°W		Early 16th century	The gatehouse was extended in the late 16th or early 17th century. The original part has a timber framed core, its lower storey has been encased in stone, the extension is in stone, and the roof is in stone slate with coped gables and kneelers. There are two storeys and an attic. The upper storey of west gable end is timber-framed and contains a four-light oriel window, a decorated tie-beam and a finial. There is a doorway in the ground floor, and another doorway in the north front approached by steps. A string course goes round the building, and the windows are mullioned, some with hood moulds.	II*
Orchard walls, Kirklees Priory; 53.69484°N 1.73647°W	—	Early 16th century	The dry stone walls enclose the former orchard of the priory. They are surmounted by a triangular Gothic ridge moulded at the apex. In the angles are quoins, and in the west wall is a chamfered gateway with composite jambs.	II
Black Horse Hotel; 53.69970°N 1.75368°W		Mid 16th century	Three cottages combined to form a public house. There is evidence of timber framing at the rear, and the building was rebuilt in the 18th century. It is in stone with quoins, and a stone slate roof with a coped gable on the right. There are two storeys and at the rear is a single-storey aisle. The windows are mullioned, two doorways have tie-stone jambs, and the other has monolithic jambs.	II
Kirklees Hall and stables 53.69632°N 1.74354°W		Mid 16th century	A country house that has been altered and extended, including in about 1770 by John Carr, it has later been converted into apartments. It is in stone, and has a hipped slate roof. The north front has an E-shaped plan, with a central porch and projecting wings, and it contains sash windows. Behind it are two wings, the southeast wing with three storeys and a staircase tower with a small octagonal spire. To the west is a ten-bay service wing forming the north side of a courtyard that has a single-storey range on the west. On the south side is a stable range with mullioned windows, a coped gable with finials, and a cupola.	I
Sundial, Kirklees Park; 53.69460°N 1.73542°W	—	1617	The sundial was set on a new plinth in 1991, and moved to its present site in 1989. It consists of a square stone slab with a bronze gnomon and an inscribed dial including a coat of arms. It stands on a square plinth that has a chamfered base and cap, on an octagonal step, and it also carries inscriptions.	II
Barn northeast of 23 Towngate; 53.70435°N 1.76204°W	—	Early 17th century	The barn is in stone and has a stone slate roof with coped gables and kneelers. There are five bays and an aisle on the west. In the east front is an elliptical-arched doorway with monolithic jambs, inserted windows, a lean-to and rectangular vents. The west front has similar doorways and windows.	II
Single-aisled cow house, Home Farm; 53.69561°N 1.73703°W	—	Early 17th century	Originally timber framed, the cow house has been enclosed in stone, and has a stone slate roof with coped gables and kneelers. There are two bays and a single aisle. In the gable end are three doorways; the doorway to the aisle has a four-centred arched head and spandrels, the others have depressed arches, and all have moulded jambs.	II*
Two-cell house, Home Farm; 53.69601°N 1.73748°W		Early 17th century	The building is in stone with a string course, and a stone slate roof with coped gables and kneelers. There are two storeys and two bays. The windows are double chamfered and mullioned, and in the north gable end is a doorway with composite jambs and a Tudor arched lintel.	II*
Highley Hall and Barn; 53.70315°N 1.75975°W	—	1632	The house and barn are in stone with stone slate roofs. The house has two storeys and an attic, a symmetrical front of three bays, and a coped gable with kneelers and lantern finials. The outer bays contains gabled porches with coping, kneelers and lantern finials, and they contain doorways with Tudor arched lintels and spandrels. The windows are mullioned with a continuous hood mould over the porches and ground floor windows, and in the left return is a twelve-light mullioned and transomed window. The barn has a segmental-arched cart entry with composite jambs on the left, and there is a half-aisle with Tudor arched doorways.	II*
Cross Platts Farmhouse; 53.70954°N 1.81600°W	—	Early to mid 17th century	The house is in rendered stone and has a stone slate roof. There are two storeys, and it consists of a two-bay hall range with a gabled projecting cross-wing on the left. The arched doorway has chamfered composite jambs and spandrels, most of the windows have double chamfered mullions, and some have hood moulds.	II
Slead Hall; 53.71128°N 1.79374°W	—	1636	The oldest part is the hall and a cross-wing, with additional wings added in 1718. The house is in stone with a parapet, an irregular plan, and a stone slate roof with coped gables and lantern finials. The south front has a hall range of two bays, the original gabled cross-wing on the right, and the later gabled wings on the left. The windows vary; some are mullioned and transomed, and others are sashes. The entrance is through a portico added in the 1880s, which has open arcades with square columns and finials. The doorway has moulded composite jambs and an arched lintel with sunken spandrels.	II
Four-bay barn, Home Farm; 53.69561°N 1.73791°W	—	Late 17th century	The barn, probably originally timber framed and later encased in stone. It has four bays, a central threshing door, and two floors at the south end.	II
Malthouse, Home Farm; 53.69640°N 1.73905°W		Late 17th century	The malthouse is in stone on a plinth, with quoins, string courses, and a stone slate roof with coped gables, kneelers, and bases for finials. There are three storeys and an attic, and an L-shaped plan. The building contains cart entries with composite jambs and four-centred arched lintels, mullioned windows, and external steps leading to a segmental-arched doorway in the first floor.	I
Two-storey gabled building, Home Farm; 53.69583°N 1.73768°W		Late 17th century	Originally a three-storey dovecote, the building is in stone with quoins, a moulded string course, and a stone slate roof with coped gables and kneelers. There are two storeys and one bay, and the windows are mullioned.	II
Lodge to Kirklees Hall; 53.69602°N 1.74519°W	—	Late 17th century (possible)	The lodge is in stone with quoins and a stone slate roof with coped gables and spike finials. There is one storey and an attic, and two bays. The windows are chamfered and mullioned, one with a hood mould, and the doorway has moulded jambs and a Tudor arched head.	II
Stables and barn, Slead Hall; 53.71151°N 1.79355°W	—	1721	The barn is the older part, it is in stone, with quoins, a single aisle, and a corrugated iron roof with coped gables, kneelers and finials. It has three bays, and contains a segmental-arched cart entry with a keystone, and a doorway, both with composite jambs. At right angles is a 19th-century two-storey stable block that contains a pitching hole under a gablet, and windows, some of which have pointed heads, others are sashes, and one forms a columbarium. Nearby is a mounting block.	II
190, 192 and 194 Halifax Road; 53.71330°N 1.79807°W	—	Early 18th century	A row of three stone cottages with a stone slate roof. There are two storeys, and each cottage has one bay, a doorway with monolithic jambs, and mullioned windows containing sashes.	II
Five-bay barn, Home Farm; 53.69556°N 1.73747°W		Early 18th century	A stone barn with quoins and a stone slate roof with coped gables. There are five bays, and it contains a square-headed entry, and three-light mullioned vents.	II
Ganny Lock and footbridge 53.70245°N 1.78972°W		Mid 18th century	The lock is at the end of the North Cut of the Calder and Hebble Navigation leading to the River Calder. It is in stone with cappings, and has rebates for gates. There is a raised stone gantry for the bridge at the southern end.	II
Gates and gate piers, Kirklees Hall; 53.69614°N 1.74514°W	—	18th century	The gates are at the entrance to the drive of the hall. There are four gate piers flanking a carriage entry and pedestrian side gates. The gates and the overthrow are in wrought iron.	II
Kirklees Top Lock; 53.69234°N 1.74649°W		18th century	The lock on the Kirklees Cut of the Calder and Hebble Navigation has stone retaining walls. There are stone and wooden bollards, mooring irons, and two pairs of lock gates.	II
Robin Hood's Grave; 53.68974°N 1.73789°W		18th century	The grave is enclosed by coped stone walls with fluted Doric columns surmounted by finials in the corners. In the north wall is an inscribed tablet, and the grave contains a stone fragment. The whole is surrounded by cast iron railings.	II
Brighouse Upper Lock; 53.70032°N 1.77660°W		c. 1768	The lock leads from the Calder and Hebble Navigation into the Brighouse Canal Basin. It is in stone with cappings, and has rebates for gates.	II
Brighouse Lower Lock; 53.69964°N 1.77579°W		c. 1768	The lock leads from the Brighouse Canal Basin of the Calder and Hebble Navigation to the River Calder. It is in stone with cappings, and has rebates for gates, and angled retaining walls into the river.	II
7–21 Brighouse Wood Row; 53.70458°N 1.79163°W		Late 18th century	A row of stone cottages with a stone slate roof. They have two storeys and one bay each. Each cottage has a doorway with monolithic jambs, and mullioned windows. A garage door has been inserted into No. 17.	II
6–16 William Henry Street; 53.70740°N 1.78631°W	—	Late 18th century	A row of stone cottages with a stone slate roof. They have two storeys and one bay each. Each cottage has a doorway with monolithic jambs, and mullioned windows.	II
Brookfoot Floodgate; 53.70137°N 1.79734°W	—	Late 18th century	The floodgate links the North Cut of the Calder and Hebble Navigation with Freeman's Cut and the entry to the River Calder. There are large retaining stone walls with rebates for the gates.	II
Brookfoot Lock and footbridge 53.70156°N 1.79749°W		Late 18th century	The lock on the Calder and Hebble Navigation is in stone with rebates for gates. The bridge is in stone, it consists of a single segmental arch, and has a parapet.	II
Brookfoot Lock Keepers House; 53.70146°N 1.79748°W		Late 18th century	The lock keeper's house is in stone with a hipped roof. There is one storey, three bays, the middle bay canted and containing a doorway, and an outshut on the right.	II
Cooper Bridge Lock and gantry to foot bridge 53.68131°N 1.73152°W		Late 18th century	The lock is on the Calder and Hebble Navigation at its entry to the River Calder. It has massive stone retaining walls with recesses for gates, and the gantry to the footbridge has rusticated stone supports.	II
Cooper Bridge Lock Keepers House; 53.68111°N 1.73163°W	—	Late 18th century	The lock keeper's house is in stone with a hipped roof. There is one storey, an L-shaped plan, and an extension added to the left in about 1983. The house has two doorways with monolithic jambs, on the front are sash windows, and on the front facing the canal the windows are mullioned.	II
Cromwell Lock and Bridge; 53.69880°N 1.80449°W		Late 18th century	The lock on the Calder and Hebble Navigation is in stone and has rebates for gates. The attached stone bridge has a pediment and columnar piers on each side. Its central part has been renewed in steel and carries a plaque with the date and details of the builders.	II
Kirklees Mill; 53.69342°N 1.74478°W	—	Late 18th century	A former corn watermill, it is in stone with quoins and a stone slate roof. There are two storeys and an attic, and a symmetrical front of five bays. In the centre is a doorway with tie-stones and a taking-in door with a canopy, above which is a Venetian window. In the outer bays and returns are mullioned windows, and the returns have Venetian windows in the attics. At the rear is an outshut containing a cast iron undershot water wheel, and the archway to the mill race has a dated keystone.	II
Lilac Cottage; 53.68188°N 1.73434°W	—	Late 18th century	A stone house with a stone slate roof, two storeys, and a single-storey kitchen wing at right angles. On the east front are four-light mullioned windows, and on the west side is doorway with monolithic jambs.	II
Slead House; 53.70954°N 1.79288°W	—	Late 18th century	A stone house with quoins, a moulded eaves cornice, and a stone slate roof with coped gables. There are three storeys, a symmetrical front of three bays, and on the right is an added range with a hipped roof. In the centre is a 19th-century porch with a gable forming a pediment over a doorway flanked by square columns with ball finials, and the windows are sashes. In the right return is a doorway with monolithic jambs, an arched head and spandrels.	II
27 and 29 Brookfoot Lane; 53.70615°N 1.80212°W	—	1787	A house and a school, later two houses, they are in stone on a plinth, with rusticated quoins, a band, and a stone slate roof. There are two storeys, a symmetrical front of three bays, and a single-storey outshut at the rear under a catslide roof. In the middle bay are paired doorways with a central monolithic jamb, and the windows are sashes. Above the doorways is a large inscribed tablet.	II
Former Bethel Chapel; 53.70130°N 1.78086°W		1811	The former chapel is in stone on a plinth, with rusticated quoins, a frieze, a cornice and blocking course, and a stone slate roof. There are two storeys and a symmetrical front of three bays. The central doorway is arched, with a rusticated surround and a heavy cornice on consoles, and the windows are sashes with architraves and cornices.	II
Canal milestone 53.69726°N 1.81379°W		Late 18th to early 19th century (probable)	The milestone on the towpath of the Calder and Hebble Navigation has a curved top and chamfered edges. It is inscribed with the distance from "FALL ING".	II
Cart Shed, Home Farm; 53.69591°N 1.73760°W	—	Late 18th to early 19th century	The cart shed is in stone and has a stone slate roof. It is open on the yard side.	II
Wharfe Works; 53.68237°N 1.73500°W		Late 18th to early 19th century	A warehouse and an attached house, they are in stone. The warehouse has a stone slate roof, and the house, which has a single storey and an octagonal plan, has a slate roof. The warehouse has two storeys, on the front is a large entry in each floor, and the windows in both parts are sashes.	II
Anchor Bridge; 53.70071°N 1.78219°W		1821	The bridge carries Briggate (A643 road) over the Calder and Hebble Navigation. It is in stone and consists of a single segmental span. The bridge has ramps, a parapet, and a dated keystone.	II
116 Halifax Road; 53.71040°N 1.79476°W		Early 19th century	Originally the lodge to Slead Hall, later a private house, it is in stone with a pyramidal stone slate roof. There is one storey and a rectangular plan. The windows have pointed Gothic arches, and one forms a doorway.	II
30 Towngate; 53.70397°N 1.76228°W	—	Early 19th century	A stone house, rendered at the rear, with quoins and a stone slate roof. It is built back-to-earth with three storeys at the front and three at the rear. There is a symmetrical front of three bays, and a central doorway with composite jambs. In the ground floor are sash windows, the middle floor contains mullioned windows and in the top floor is a 15-light weaver's window.	II
Ash Grove; 53.69832°N 1.81661°W	—	Early 19th century	A stuccoed house with a band, a cornice, and a hipped slate roof. There are two storeys, an original block with a symmetrical front of three bays, and a later bay added to the left. The porch has Tuscan columns, an entablature and a cornice, the inner doorway has pilasters, and the windows are sashes.	II
Kirklees Mill House and Cottages; 53.69385°N 1.74469°W	—	Early 19th century	The house is in stone with quoins and a hipped stone slate roof. There are two storeys and a symmetrical front of three bays. The central doorway has monolithic jambs, and the windows are sashes. On the right return are two cottages with mullioned windows.	II
Old Lock House; 53.69976°N 1.77560°W		Early 19th century	A lock keeper's house, it is in stone with a hipped stone slate roof. There are two storeys and a symmetrical front of two bays; between the bays is a single-storey octagonal projection, forming a T-shaped plan. The doorway has monolithic jambs, and the windows are sashes with cambered arched lintels.	II
St Martins' Church; 53.70432°N 1.78400°W		1830–31	A Commissioners' Church, it was restored in 1894–95, and extended in 1903–04. It is built in stone with a slate roof, and consists of a nave, a chancel, and a west tower. The tower has three stages, an empty niche, a clock face, and an embattled parapet with crocketed pinnacles. Between the nave and the chancel is an octagonal pinnacle. The windows are lancets with Y-tracery and the nave has an embattled parapet.	II
Former Perseverance Mill; 53.70070°N 1.77946°W		1831	The mill, later used for other purposes, is in stone with sill bands, a moulded cornice, and a stone slate roof. There are four storeys, the symmetrical three-bay front facing the road has a pedimented gable containing a dated plaque in the tympanum, and there are ten bays along the left return. On the front, the middle bay projects slightly and contains windows converted from taking-in doors.	II
Further Education Centre; 53.70357°N 1.78345°W		1835	Originally a school, it was extended in 1861 and has since been used for other purposes. It is in stone, with one storey, and in Gothic Revival style. The original range has a coped gable end facing the lane. This has a plinth, and contains a triple lancet window with a hood mould and a quatrefoil above, In the left return is a doorway with a pointed arch and an inscribed stone, and the right return contains seven bays with pointed-arched windows. At the rear is a later nine-bay range, and beyond that is a range at right angles with two bays, and a two-storey master's house.	II
Former Stotts Arms; 53.70264°N 1.77624°W		Early to mid 19th century	The public house, later used for other purposes, is in stone on a plinth, with rusticated quoins, a cornice, and a stone slate roof with coped gables. There are two storeys and a symmetrical front of three bays. The central doorway has panelled jambs and a segmental pediment, and the windows on the front are sashes. In the gable ends are Venetian windows.	II
Railway bridge over River Calder; 53.68833°N 1.74076°W		1840	The bridge was built by the Manchester and Leeds Railway to carry its line over the River Calder, and it carries the north track. It is in stone and consists of two segmental skew arches. The bridge has rusticated voussoirs, a modillioned cornice and a parapet.	II
St. Martin's Vicarage; 53.70408°N 1.78479°W	—	1840	The vicarage is in stone with a stone slate roof. There are two storeys, and a southeast front of four bays with an F-shaped plan. In the second bay is a two-storey gabled porch that has a doorway with a depressed Tudor arch, above which is an inscribed tablet. Over this is an arched window, openwork cusped bargeboards, and finials. The fourth bay projects and has a similar gable. The windows have chamfered surrounds and hood moulds, and in the first and third bays are shaped dormers.	II
Brighouse Library and Smith Art Gallery; 53.70395°N 1.78623°W		c. 1841	Originally a house, it was converted into a library in 1898, and in 1907 it was expanded to add an art gallery. The building is in stone with rusticated quoins, a cornice, a blocking course, and a hipped slate roof. There are two storeys and a symmetrical west front of three bays. On the front is a porch with double columns on a plinth, the outer columns square and the inner columns with Corinthian capitals, and an entablature, and the semicircular-arched doorway has pilasters, monolithic jambs, imposts, and a fanlight. The windows are sash windows with architraves and cornices, and in the upper floor they have sills on consoles. Along the right return are seven bays that contain three single-storey bow windows with cast iron balconies.	II
Milestone near Ash Grove; 53.69970°N 1.81037°W		Mid 19th century	The milestone is on the south side of Elland Road (A6025 road). It has an arched head, a triangular plan, two projecting faces, and lettering in cast iron. On the head is "ELLAND & BRIGHOUSE ROAD" and "SOUTHOWRAM", and on the faces are the distances to Elland, Wakefield and Dewsbury.	II
Milestone opposite 100 Elland Road; 53.70518°N 1.79311°W		Mid 19th century	The milestone is on the southwest side of Elland Road (A6025 road). It has an arched head, and is overlaid with a cast iron sheet divided into three sections. The top section is inscribed with ""ELLAND & BRIGHOUSE ROAD" and "BRIGHOUSE", and the lower sections indicate the distances to Elland, Wakefield, Dewsbury, and Brighouse.	II
Milestone on Huddersfield Road; 53.70062°N 1.77904°W		Mid 19th century	The milestone is on the east side of Huddersfield Road (A641 road). It has an arched head, a triangular plan, two projecting faces, and lettering in cast iron. On the head is "'BRADFORD & HUDDERSFIELD ROAD" and "BRIGHOUSE" and on the faces are the distances to Bradford and Huddersfield, and details of the manufacturers.	II
Milestone opposite Towngate; 53.70506°N 1.76353°W		Mid 19th century	The milestone is on the northwest side of Clifton Common (A643 road). It has an arched head, a triangular plan, two projecting faces, and lettering in cast iron. On the head is "LEEDS AND ELLAND ROAD" and "CLIFTON", and on the faces are the distances to Cleckheaton, Birstal, Morley, and Brighouse.	II
Civic Hall; 53.70174°N 1.77946°W		1875	The building, which was designed by Mallinson and Barber, was originally the town hall, later a theatre, a magistrates' court, and a cinema, and since 1968 it has been a civic hall with shops in the ground floor. It is in a splayed corner site, in stone, with a band, a cornice, and a hipped slate roof. The ground floor is rusticated and contains an arcade of segmental arches with shop fronts and entrances. The front facing Bethel Street has three storeys and five bays. The middle floor contains sash window with elliptical heads, architraves, cornices, and two have pediments. In the top floor are two-light mullioned windows. The front facing Bradford Road has two storeys and seven bays. The tall windows have round heads, keystones and hood moulds, and between them are circular blind openings.	II
Barclays Bank; 53.70146°N 1.78194°W		1875	The bank is in stone, on a plinth, with quoins, a band, a moulded cornice, a blocking course rising to a pediment containing the date, and a slate roof. There are three storeys and five bays. The doorway is in the first bay, and the ground floor has semicircular-arched windows with keystones, and Doric columns with an entablature and a cornice. In the middle floor are sash windows, each with an architrave and a cornice, and in the top floor the windows have segmental heads and architraves.	II
Boundary stone 53.69769°N 1.82587°W	—	Late 19th century	The boundary stone is on the south side of Elland Road (A6025). It is a stone slab with two faces and indicates the boundary between Elland Urban District and Southowram.	II
Former Park Methodist Church and Sunday School; 53.70150°N 1.77986°W		1878	The church and Sunday school, later used for other purposes, are in stone with a string course, a false machicolated eaves cornice, and a slate roof. There are two storeys, a five-bay hall range flanked by square towers with pavilion roofs and iron cresting, and a right return of nine bays. In each tower is a doorway with a moulded surround, and a round-headed panelled tympanum under a gable with a crocketed finial. Above the doorway is a tall Romanesque window, and the east tower also has an oculus with an ogee cap. The windows in the ground floor have segmental heads, and in the upper floor they form an arcade of round-headed windows.	II
Town Hall; 53.70139°N 1.78178°W		1887	The town hall, to which the clock was added in 1914, is in stone on a plinth, with a band, a cornice, a balustrade, a slate roof, and a clock within an open pediment. There are two storeys and a symmetrical front of five bays. The central doorway has an architrave, pilasters, a square lintel, an inscribed apron, and a cornice. The ground floor windows have pilasters, and those in the upper floor have a cornice on consoles, the middle window with a curved pediment.	II
Brearley Bridge; 53.69207°N 1.74489°W		1895	The bridge carries a track over the Kirklees Cut of the Calder and Hebble Navigation. It is in steel and paved with stone setts, and consists of a single segmental arch. The bridge has stone ramps, cylindrical piers and parapets. On the bridge is a plaque with the date and the details of the manufacturer.	II
National Westminster Bank; 53.70204°N 1.77902°W		1895	The bank is in stone with a slate roof, two storeys and an attic, and a front of six bays. Bays 2–4 are flanked by octagonal colonnettes that rise to lantern domed finials, and between these is an angled gable with a cornice and ball finials. The windows are cross windows. There is a doorway in each of the outer bays; the left doorway has pilasters, imposts, a semicircular arch with a decorated keystone and carved spandrels with shields. The doorway in the right bay has an architrave and a square lintel, and above it is an oriel window, carved beneath, and with a small gable and ball finials. Above the first and fifth bays are balustrades.	II
Bethel Methodist Church and Sunday School; 53.70241°N 1.78393°W		1905	The church, which is in Arts and Crafts Perpendicular style, is built in sandstone with slate roofs. It consists of a nave with a clerestory and aisles, a projecting porch, and there is a large west window. At the southwest is tower with clasping buttresses, a shaped parapet, and a short recessed tiled spire. On the east side is a hall and a Sunday school that has asymmetrical gables and stepped embattled parapets. At the southeast is a square tower with a pyramidal roof and a finial.	II
Reconstructed Roman Watchtower; 53.69109°N 1.73870°W	—	1905	A folly in the form of a Roman watchtower, it is in stone with quoins, and has a pyramidal slate roof. The tower has a square plan and three storeys, and there is an external stone staircase to the middle floor on the south side. In the middle floor is a doorway and two round-headed windows, and in the ground floor is a doorway with an initialled lintel; the other openings are blocked.	II
War memorial 53.70368°N 1.78574°W		1922	The war memorial stands in Rydings Park. It consists of a plinth and a tall marble column, on which stands a bronze statue of a winged personification of Peace standing on a ball and holding a crown of laurels.	II

== Sources ==
- Historic England, "The Nuns Grave, Brighouse (1133847)", National Heritage List for England
- Historic England, "Nos. 1 and 3 Upper Green Lane, Brighouse (1314090)", National Heritage List for England
- Historic England, "Home Farm Building No. 1 double-aisled barn to north-west of Kirklees Priory Gatehouse, Brighouse (1133848)", National Heritage List for England
- Historic England, "Home Farm Building No. 7 L-shaped aisled barn, Brighouse (1133808)", National Heritage List for England
- Historic England, "Kirklees Priory Gatehouse, Brighouse (1314039)", National Heritage List for England
- Historic England, "Walls which enclose former Orchard for Kirklees Priory 80 metres East of Priory Gatehouse, Brighouse (1300282)", National Heritage List for England
- Historic England, "Black Horse Hotel, Brighouse (1133826)", National Heritage List for England
- Historic England, "Kirklees Hall Mansion and attached stables, Brighouse (1184034)", National Heritage List for England
- Historic England, "Sundial at Priory Gardens, Kirklees Park, Brighouse (1133846)", National Heritage List for England
- Historic England, "Barn to north-east of No. 23 Towngate, Brighouse (1184373)", National Heritage List for England
- Historic England, "Home Farm Building No. 2 single aisled cow house, Brighouse (1133805)", National Heritage List for England
- Historic England, "Home Farm Building No. 6 two-cell house, Brighouse (1314059)", National Heritage List for England
- Historic England, "Highley Hall and Barn, Brighouse (1314067)", National Heritage List for England
- Historic England, "Cross Platts Farmhouse, Brighouse (1183806)", National Heritage List for England
- Historic England, "Slead Hall, Brighouse (1314034)", National Heritage List for England
- Historic England, "Home Farm Building No. 4 four-bay barn to north-west of Kirklees Priory Gatehouse, Brighouse (1314058)", National Heritage List for England
- Historic England, "Home Farm Building No. 9 Malthouse, Brighouse (1133809)", National Heritage List for England
- Historic England, "Home Farm Building No. 5 two-storey gabled building, Brighouse (1133807)", National Heritage List for England
- Historic England, "Lodge to Kirklees Hall, Brighouse (1314038)", National Heritage List for England
- Historic England, "Stables and barn to rear of Slead Hall, Brighouse (1183985)", National Heritage List for England
- Historic England, "Nos. 190, 192 and 194 Halifax Road, Brighouse (1314033)", National Heritage List for England
- Historic England, "Home Farm Building No. 3 five-bay barn to north-west of Kirklees Priory Gatehouse, Brighouse (1133806)", National Heritage List for England
- Historic England, "Calder and Hebble Navigation Ganny Lock and footbridge, Brighouse (1183729)", National Heritage List for England
- Historic England, "Gates and gate piers to Kirklees Hall, Brighouse (1184024)", National Heritage List for England
- Historic England, "Calder and Hebble Navigation Kirklees Top Lock, Brighouse (1134344)", National Heritage List for England
- Historic England, "Robin Hood's Grave, Brighouse (1184066)", National Heritage List for England
- Historic England, "Calder and Hebble Navigation Brighouse Upper Lock, Brighouse (1183736)", National Heritage List for England
- Historic England, "Calder and Hebble Navigation Brighouse Lower Lock, Brighouse (1314045)", National Heritage List for England
- Historic England, "Nos. 7–21 Brighouse Wood Row, Brighouse (1133858)", National Heritage List for England
- Historic England, "Nos. 6–16 William Henry Street, Brighouse (1133798)", National Heritage List for England
- Historic England, "Calder and Hebble Navigation Brookfoot Floodgate, Brighouse (1133860)", National Heritage List for England
- Historic England, "Calder and Hebble Navigation Brookfoot Lock and footbridge, Brighouse (1365697)", National Heritage List for England
- Historic England, "Calder and Hebble Navigation Brookfoot Lock Keeper's House, Brighouse (1314047)", National Heritage List for England
- Historic England, "Calder and Hebble Navigation Coopers Bridge Lock and gantry to footbridge, Brighouse (1133863)", National Heritage List for England
- Historic England, "Calder and Hebble Navigation Coopers Bridge Lock Keeper's House, Brighouse (1183774)", National Heritage List for England
- Historic England, "Calder and Hebble Navigation Cromwell Lock and Bridge, Brighouse (1133864)", National Heritage List for England
- Historic England, "Kirklees Mill, Brighouse (1184463)", National Heritage List for England
- Historic England, "Lilac Cottage, Brighouse (1314070)", National Heritage List for England
- Historic England, "Slead House, Brighouse (1300368)", National Heritage List for England
- Historic England, "Nos. 27 and 29 Brookfoot Lane, Brighouse (1133859)", National Heritage List for England
- Historic England, "Kirklees Printing Company, Brighouse (1314042)", National Heritage List for England
- Historic England, "Calder and Hebble Navigation Milepost approx 20 metres east of Crowther Bridge, at SE 1240 2233, Brighouse (1255226)", National Heritage List for England
- Historic England, "Home Farm Building No. 8 Cart shed, Brighouse (1314060)", National Heritage List for England
- Historic England, "Calder and Hebble Navigation Wharfe Works, Brighouse (1183755)", National Heritage List for England
- Historic England, "Calder and Hebble Navigation Anchor Bridge CH9, Brighouse (1133861)", National Heritage List for England
- Historic England, "No. 116 Halifax Road, Brighouse (1133841)", National Heritage List for England
- Historic England, "No. 30 Towngate, Brighouse (1184388)", National Heritage List for England
- Historic England, "Ash Grove, Brighouse (1300388)", National Heritage List for England
- Historic England, "Kirklees Mill House and Kirklees Cottage, Brighouse (1184470)", National Heritage List for England
- Historic England, "Calder and Hebble Navigation Old Lock House fronting Brighouse Lower Lock, Brighouse (1300445)", National Heritage List for England
- Historic England, "Church of St. Martin, Brighouse (1365699)", National Heritage List for England
- Historic England, "Perseverance Mill, Brighouse (1133845)", National Heritage List for England
- Historic England, "Further Education Centre, Brighouse (1133865)", National Heritage List for England
- Historic England, "Stotts Arms, Brighouse (1133796)", National Heritage List for England
- Historic England, "Bridge carrying north track of railway over River Calder, downstream from Kirklees Cut, Bradley, Brighouse (1220150)", National Heritage List for England
- Historic England, "St. Martin's Vicarage, Brighouse (1314048)", National Heritage List for England
- Historic England, "Brighouse Library and Smith Art Gallery, Brighouse (1183940)", National Heritage List for England
- Historic England, "Milestone 500 metres beyond Ash Grove going towards Brighouse at NGR SE 123 225, Brighouse (1133836)", National Heritage List for England
- Historic England, "Milestone opposite No. 100 Elland Road at NGR SE 137232, Brighouse (1133835)", National Heritage List for England
- Historic England, "Milestone to north of Canal Bridge at NGR SE 146227, Brighouse (1314037)", National Heritage List for England
- Historic England, "Milestone opposite junction with Towngate at NGR SE 157 232, Brighouse (1133868)", National Heritage List for England
- Historic England, "Civic Hall, Brighouse (1133850)", National Heritage List for England
- Historic England, "Barclays Bank, Brighouse (1183673)", National Heritage List for England
- Historic England, "Boundary stone, 130 metres west of Rawson's Arms at NGR SE 115223, Brighouse (1133837)", National Heritage List for England
- Historic England, "Park Methodist Church and attached Sunday School, Brighouse (1133851)", National Heritage List for England
- Historic England, "Town Hall, Brighouse (1133856)", National Heritage List for England
- Historic England, "Calder and Hebble Navigation Kirklees Cut Brearley Bridge, Brighouse (1134345)", National Heritage List for England
- Historic England, "National Westminster Bank, Brighouse (1133855)", National Heritage List for England
- Historic England, "Bethel Methodist Church with integral Sunday School, Brighouse (1183964)", National Heritage List for England
- Historic England, "Reconstructed Roman Watchtower, Brighouse (1419209)", National Heritage List for England
- Historic England, "War Memorial in Rydings Park, Brighouse (1133839)", National Heritage List for England
- Historic England, Listed Buildings
- Harman, Ruth; Pevsner, Nikolaus (2017), Yorkshire West Riding: Sheffield and the South, The Buildings of England, New Haven and London: Yale University Press, ISBN 978-0-300-22468-9
