= Municipal Borough of Brighouse =

Former local government area in the UK

Coordinates: 53.798522°N 1.670292°W

Brighouse
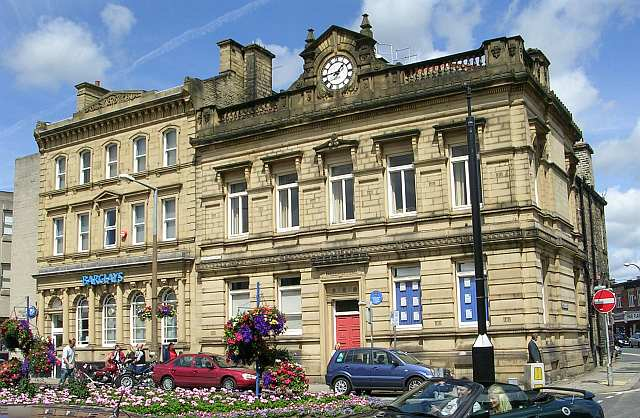
- Brighouse Town Hall
- Area
  - 1911: 2,231 acres (903 ha)
  - 1931: 2,231 acres (903 ha)
  - 1961: 7,873 acres (3,186 ha)
- Population
  - 1911: 20,843
  - 1931: 19,756
  - 1961: 30,804
- History
  - Created: 1893
  - Abolished: 1974
  - Succeeded by: Metropolitan Borough of Calderdale
- Status: Local board (1865 - 1893); Municipal borough (1894 - 1974)
- Government
  - Motto: Labore et Prudentia; By labour and prudence
- Map of boundary as of 1971

The Municipal Borough of Brighouse was a local government district in the West Riding of Yorkshire from 1873 to 1974 around the town of Brighouse, covering Clifton, Hipperholme, Hove Edge, Lightcliffe, Rastrick and Southowram.

Brighouse was historically part of the township of Hipperholme with Brighouse in the large ancient parish of Halifax. A local board formed for the parish of Brighouse in 1865. It incorporated as a municipal borough by amalgamating the local boards of Brighouse, Rastrick, and Hove Edge on 30 September 1893. Its first mayor was Alderman William Smith.

Brighouse Town Hall was opened on 16 March 1887 as the seat of local government and was taken over by the borough upon its creation. The Neoclassical sandstone building was designed by John Lord and is Grade II listed.

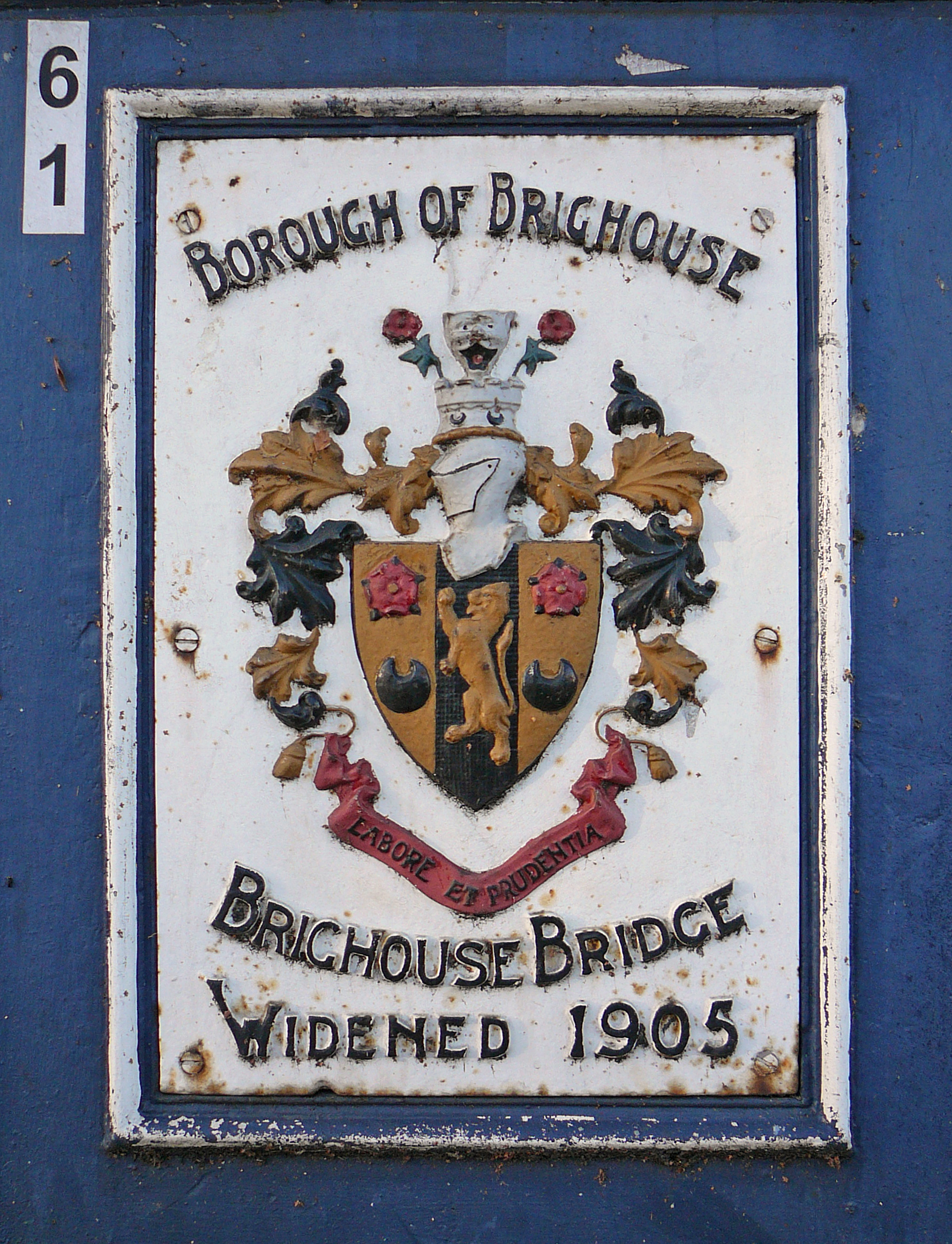
Arms of the Borough Council on Brighouse Bridge

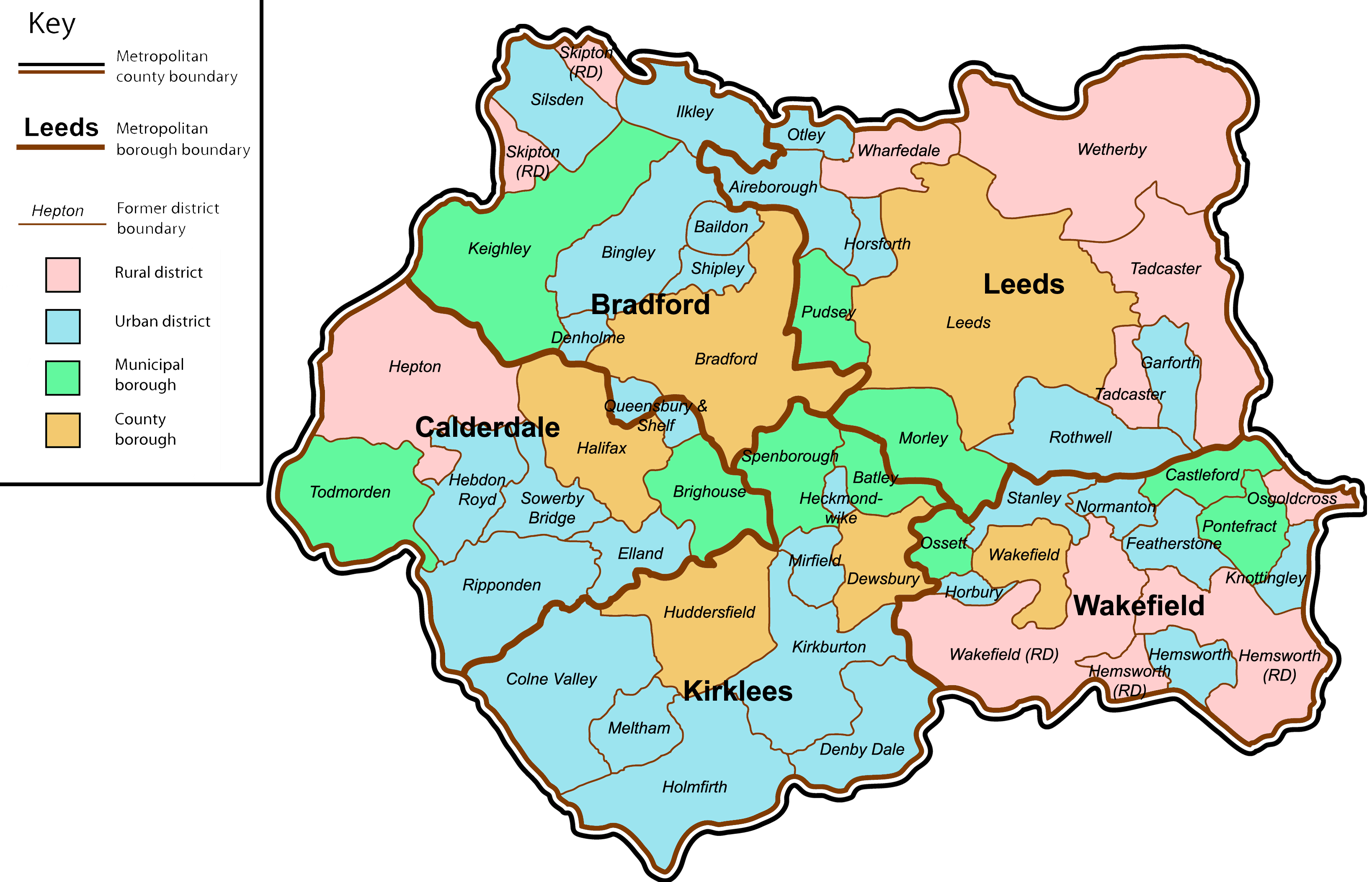
The surrounding pre-1974 districts which now make up West Yorkshire

Arms were granted to the borough council in 1895, which can be seen on a plaque Brighouse Bridge and as the logo of Brighouse Town F.C. The arms are derived from the crests of the Brighouse and Rastrick families who lived in the district in the seventeenth century. The gold lion and the black crescents come from the Brighouse family and the red roses are from the crest of the Rastrick family. It is unusual to see the inclusion of red roses on the arms of a Yorkshire borough.

In 1937 Brighouse MB expanded by absorbing part of the abolished Halifax Rural District - Norwood Green & Coley civil parish and parts of the parishes of Clifton, Fixby and Hartshead (2,811 acres); Hipperholme Urban District (1,196 acres); and Southowram Urban District (1,642 acres).

The borough was abolished under the Local Government Act 1972, and created the eastern portion of the new Metropolitan Borough of Calderdale in West Yorkshire by a merger with the County Borough of Halifax, the Municipal Borough of Todmorden, Elland, Hebden Royd, Ripponden, and Sowerby Bridge urban districts, part of Queensbury and Shelf UD and Hepton Rural District. The mayor's mace was removed in 1974 to the Town Hall, Halifax, where it is displayed in the mayor's parlour to denote the authority of the Halifax mayor.
