= Robin Hood's Death =

17th-century English ballad

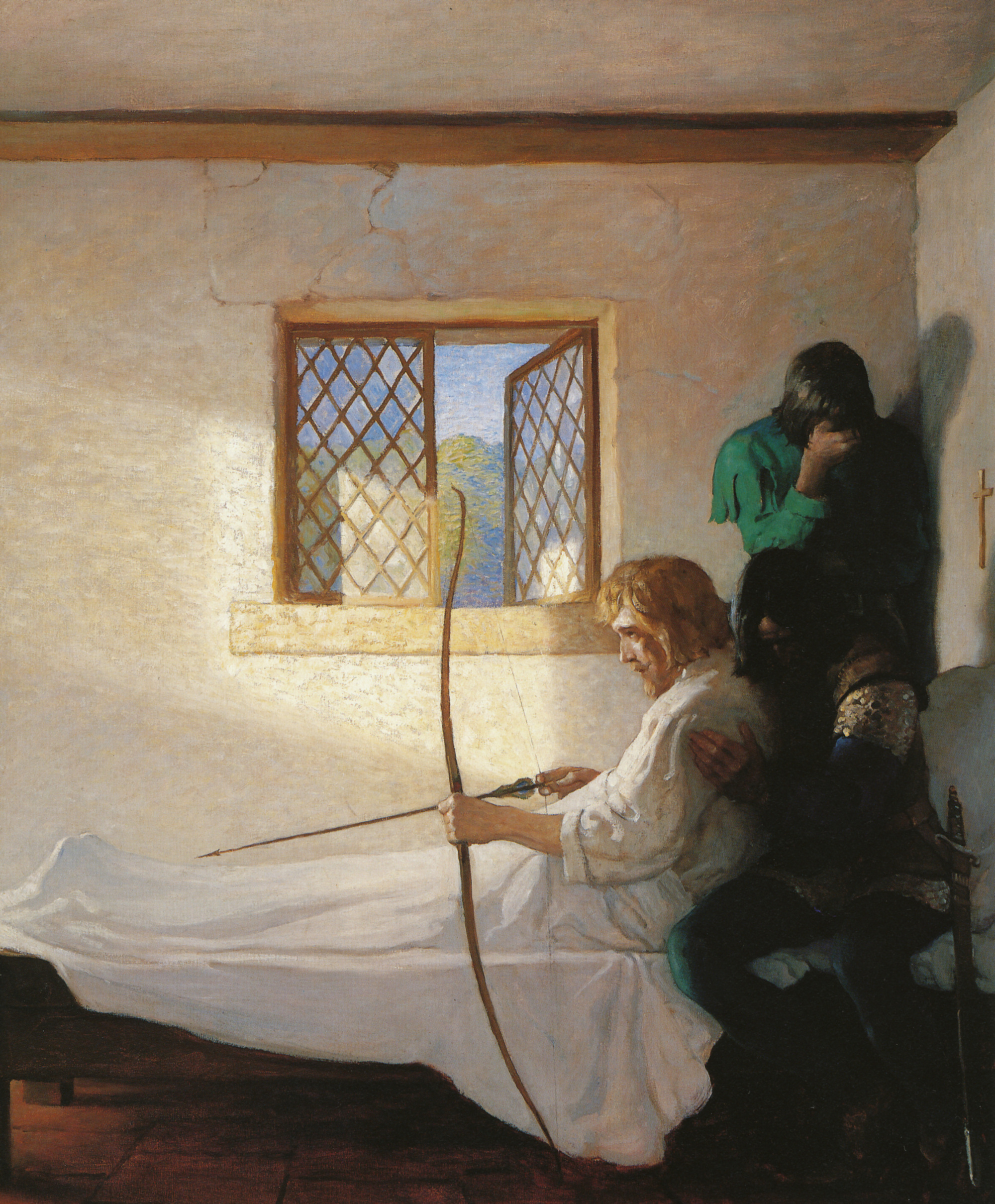
The Passing of Robin Hood by N. C. Wyeth, 1917

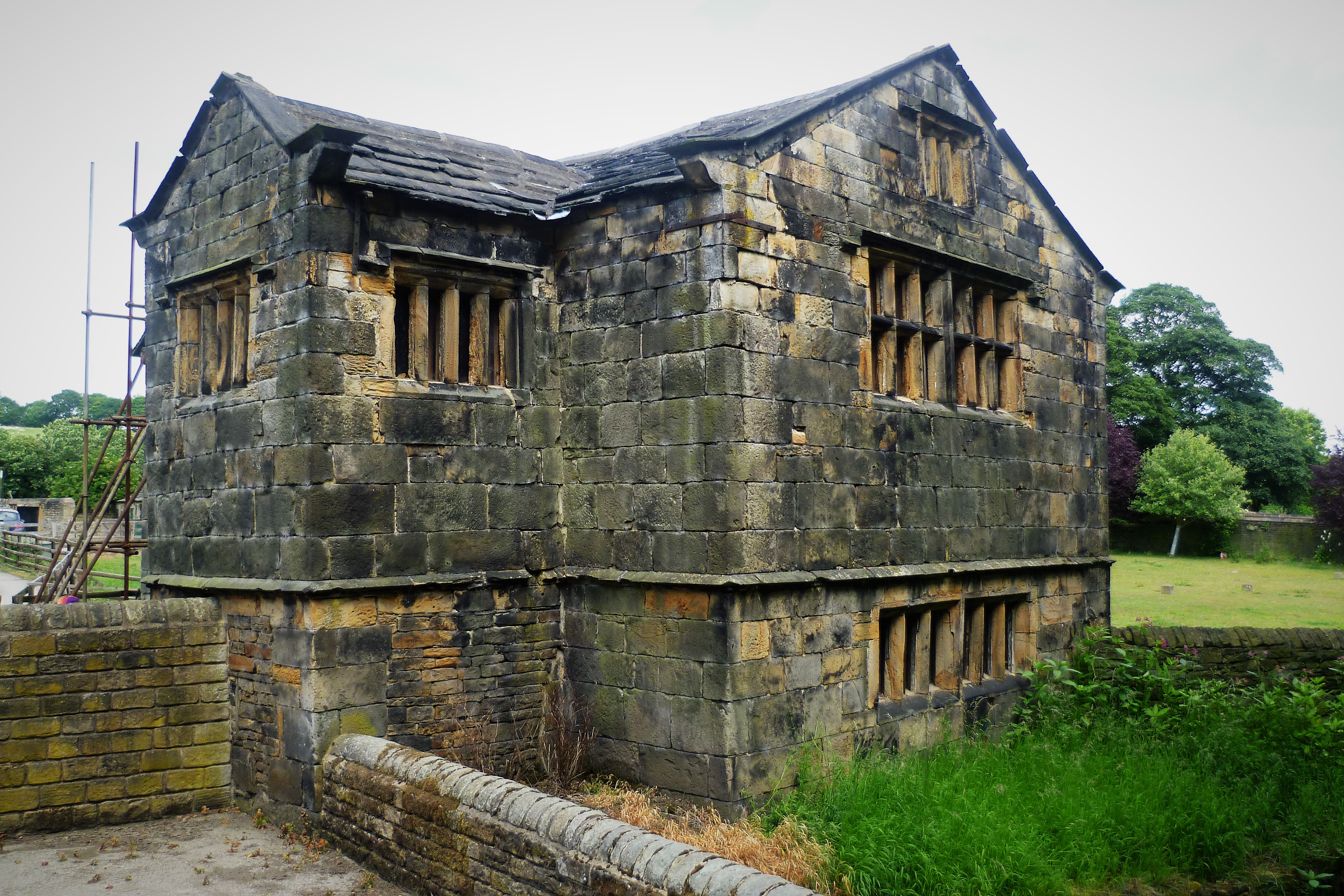
The gatehouse of Kirklees Priory

Robin Hood's Death, also known as Robin Hoode his Death, is an Early Modern English ballad of Robin Hood. It dates from at the latest the 17th century, and possibly originating earlier, making it one of the oldest existing tales of Robin Hood. It is a longer version of the last six stanzas of A Gest of Robyn Hode, suggesting that one of the authors was familiar with the other work and made an expansion (if Gest came first) or summary (if Death came first) of the other, or else both were drawing from a lost common tale. The surviving version in the Percy Folio is fragmentary, with sections missing. A more complete but later version is from the middle of the 18th century, and is written in modern English. Both versions were later published by Francis James Child as Child ballad #120 in his influential collection of popular ballads.

In Robin Hood's Death, Robin travels to Kirklees Priory, but is betrayed by his cousin, the prioress. She improperly takes too much blood while bloodletting Robin, and in one version Robin is also stabbed with a sword by a nemesis called Red Roger. Robin Hood's Grave is a monument to the final action in the story of the later version, where Robin fires one last arrow into the air and asks to be buried where it lands.

== Manuscript history ==
There are two different versions of Death: the fragmentary Percy Folio version dating from the 17th century ("A"), and a version from The English Archer c. 1767, published in 1786 ("B"). The older manuscript was recovered and published by Bishop Percy in the 1700s, around the same time as the publication of the B version. The original title is unknown; a scribe in the Percy Folio document titled it "Robin Hoode his Death", while later versions tended to use "Robin Hood's Death." Half a page of each leaf has been torn away, so only 27 stanzas survive of a probable 50-something total.

The 1786 version features an extended title of "Robin Hood's death and burial: shewing how he was taken ill, and how he went to his cousin at Kirkley Hall, who let him blood, which was the cause of his death." There are several variants of this later version, but the differences are mostly minor.

== Plot ==
But forth then of a shot windowe
Good Robin Hood he could glide;
Red Roger, with a grounding glaive,
Thrust him through the milke-white side.

But Robin was light and nimble of foote,
And thought to abate his pride,
Ffor betwixt his head and his shoulders
He made a wound full wide.

Says, Ly there, ly there, Red Roger,
The doggs they must thee eate;
'For I may have my houzle,' he said,
'For I may both goe and speake.'

— Robin Hood's Death A, Stanzas 20–22

In the "A" version of the Percy Folio, Robin Hood wishes to go to Churchlees to get himself bled (a common medieval medical practice). Will Scarlet is sceptical and offers Robin Hood a bodyguard of his best bowmen, saying that a "good yeoman" in the area is sure to quarrel with him: presumably Red Roger, also known as Roger of Doncaster. Robin refuses and takes only Little John with him. An old woman appears early on the journey, "banning" Robin Hood. Robin asks why she is doing so, but the manuscript breaks off for half a page. "Banning" is usually taken as "cursing" him, but may mean "lamenting"—predicting his death and weeping in advance.

In the next surviving fragment, Robin Hood appears to be reassuring someone who has warned him he is going to his death. Robin is confident he will be fine, as the prioress is his cousin and he trusts her. The pair arrive at Churchlees Priory. Robin offers 20 pounds to the prioress (an immense sum), and she prepares her lancing knives. Robin's trust in her proves misplaced, as she treacherously lets out too much blood. Another half page is missing of the manuscript, but may have described her motive. In A Gest of Robyn Hode, she is established to be Red Roger's lover, although given Robin's outlaw activities, she may have also had her own reasons for a grudge with her cousin. More details on Red Roger and his cause for quarrel are also possibly in the missing section—had Robin or his family taken his property, land, or title? When the manuscript resumes, Red Roger has entered Robin's room, and stabs him with his sword while Robin is weak. Robin Hood claims some consolation, though, in that he mortally wounds Roger with a neck wound prior to his own demise. Robin asks Little John to perform the sacraments and last rites for him quickly to get right with God. Little John wishes to avenge him and set fire to Churchlees, but Robin forbids it, because he fears God will blame him if he hurts a widow at his own end. Robin does ask Little John to bear him to a grave, and for him to be lain with his sword at his head, his arrows at his feet, his yew bow at his side, and a measuring rod.

(...) give me my bent bow in hand
And my broad arrows I'll let flee;

And where this arrow is taken up,
There shall my grave digged be.
With verdant sods most neatly put,
Sweet as the green wood tree.

— Robin Hood's Death B, Stanzas 15–16

The later broadside version of this ballad (the "B" version), first recorded in 1786, omits the mysterious people (or person) Robin Hood meets on his way. Red Roger is also missing, and the killing is more directly attributed to the prioress. Only Robin enters the priory at first, unlike the A version where both he and Little John enter. The prioress, in addition to letting out too much blood, actively locks Robin in the room for an entire day. Robin, desperate for aid, weakly blows his horn three times to summon Little John in distress as he realises he has been betrayed. Little John comes to the priory and smashes the locks to reunite with Robin, but is too late. He asks for leave to attack Kirkley-hall and burn it. Robin refuses permission and says in his dying monologue that he has never harmed a woman, and does not intend to start now. The B version adds the detail that Robin Hood shoots one final arrow and asks Little John to be buried where it falls.

== Analysis and influence ==
This story, and variants based on it, became the most common account of Robin Hood's death. It is in agreement with the last six stanzas of A Gest of Robyn Hode; the "pryoresse of Kyrkesly" and "Syr Roger of Donkesly" reappear as the prioress of Churchlees and Red Roger. In Gest, Roger is called "Syr" and a knight, so presumably he was also intended in this story to be a knight or former knight, albeit with the details lost in the missing sections. There is a different version in Robin Hood and the Valiant Knight that commonly appeared in the Robin Hood "garlands" or collections, and another account in A True Tale of Robin Hood. The name of Roger of Doncaster refers to a town near Barnsdale, where early ballads placed Robin Hood. J. W. Walker, an antiquarian, scoured old medieval documents and found evidence of two people named Roger of Doncaster living in the 1300s, one a chaplain, but whether they were related to the story given the commonality of the name is impossible to know.

The motif of Robin insisting on venturing into danger with just Little John is also seen in Robin Hood and the Monk, where Robin rejects a similar request from Much to take more men with him. The Robin Hood legend includes elements of anti-monasticism; while a friar is a member of his band and Robin is devoutly dedicated to the faith, monks and bishops often show up as adversaries, and the prioress in this story shows the treachery of the regular church. The motif of blowing a horn three times to summon Little John, found in the B version, is used in situations of dire need in other stories such as Robin Hood and the Curtal Friar and Robin Hood and the Shepherd. It is unknown whether the story of Robin firing one final arrow, a celebrated part of the Robin Hood saga, originates from the B version or came from some other lost legend. It is likely related to Robin Hood's Grave near Kirklees, either as an inspiration to create such a monument or else as a justification if the monument already existed.

The rhyme scheme in both versions is the standard ballad stanza of ABCB that rhymes the second and fourth line of each stanza.

This version loosely inspired the ending of the 1976 film Robin and Marian. In it, it is Robin's lover, Maid Marian, now a nun, who is his downfall, poisoning Robin and then herself when he suffers serious wounds in his final battle with the Sheriff of Nottingham, Marian wanting to spare him the personal anguish of living while incapable of being what he once was.

== See also ==
- The Death of Robin Hood (2026 film)
