= Robin Hood and the Valiant Knight =

English ballad

Robin Hood and the Valiant Knight is an 18th-century ballad of the death of Robin Hood. The song, written in Modern English, was included in the popular "garlands" (collections) of Robin Hood stories and songs published in the 18th and early 19th centuries, generally at the end as a suitable close to the garland. It was later published by Francis James Child as Child ballad #153 in his influential collection of popular ballads.

The ballad is influenced by the story Robin Hood's Death, which was generally the older and more popular of the versions. Still, Robin Hood and the Valiant Knight was used either on its own in the late 18th century, or as the penultimate story set up to precede Robin Hood's Death in the early 19th century.

== Synopsis ==
'They'd have me surrender,' quoth Robin Hood,
'And lie at their mercy then;
But tell them from me, that never shall be,
While I have full seven score men.'

— Robin Hood and the Valiant Knight, Stanza 13

The king and nobles meet to consider what to do about Robin Hood. They send Sir William with a hundred bowmen into the greenwood. Sir William presents Robin with a letter from the king ordering Robin to surrender. When Robin refuses, Sir William attempts to seize him on the spot. Both Sir William and Robin summon their men. Sir William is killed in the first wave of arrows, but the battle continues "from morning til almost noon." After the battle, Robin takes ill. The monk summoned to let his blood (a common medical procedure at the time) "took his life away," and Robin dies. His men all flee the country. The song concludes with an epitaph on Robin's grave honouring him as "no archer like him was so good."

== Analysis ==
The full title in the earliest collections is "Robin Hood and the valiant Knight; together with an Account of his Death and Burial, etc." with a notation that it is to be sung to the "Tune of Robin Hood and the fifteen Foresters." No seventeenth-century copies of the work survive if it even existed then, and it only seems to have begun regularly appearing in garlands around 1750.

Like many other Robin Hood ballads, the work adopts a rhyme scheme of ABCB that rhymes the second and fourth line of each stanza, also known as a ballad stanza. It also generally includes a middle rhyme in the third line of each stanza (C), such as stanza 2 having "For to quell their pride, or else, they reply'd."

Sir William is a figure only seen in this story and not in the wider literature, although he might be the inspiration for Sir William Dale in Howard Pyle's The Merry Adventures of Robin Hood. There is another Merry Man called William Locksley mentioned briefly, which seems to be a liberty taken with the last name "Locksley" sometimes given to Robin himself. The total number of Merry Men is given at seven score (140), the usual size of Robin's company in the ballads.

Bleeding was also the means of his death in the earlier Robin Hood's Death, but that version had it done by an abbess who was his cousin, rather than a monk. The Valiant Knight version is somewhat vague on whether the monk killed Robin via treachery or mere incompetence, saying only that the monk was responsible and that Robin "was murder'd." This version also omits Robin's reconciliation with the king.

The version is criticized on its literary merits by some scholars of Robin Hood. Child wrote that the piece "surpasses in platitude everything that has gone before" and disliked how authority won out in the end. R. B. Dobson and John Taylor considered Valiant Knight one of the very latest "traditional" ballads to be composed and was likely created as a way to bring printed garlands to a satisfactory close. They criticized the work for the casual liberties taken with the source material and wrote it "has strong claims to be regarded as the least distinguished Robin Hood ballad ever composed."

== Adaptations ==
Howard Pyle used this ballad's account of a battle between a knight named Sir William and the King's forces against the Merry Men as part of the epilogue of the popular 1883 novel The Merry Adventures of Robin Hood, with it immediately preceding the older story of the abbess from Robin Hood's Death for his depiction of the death of Robin.
