= Spenborough =

Former district in Yorkshire, England

Coordinates: 53.719°N 1.694°W

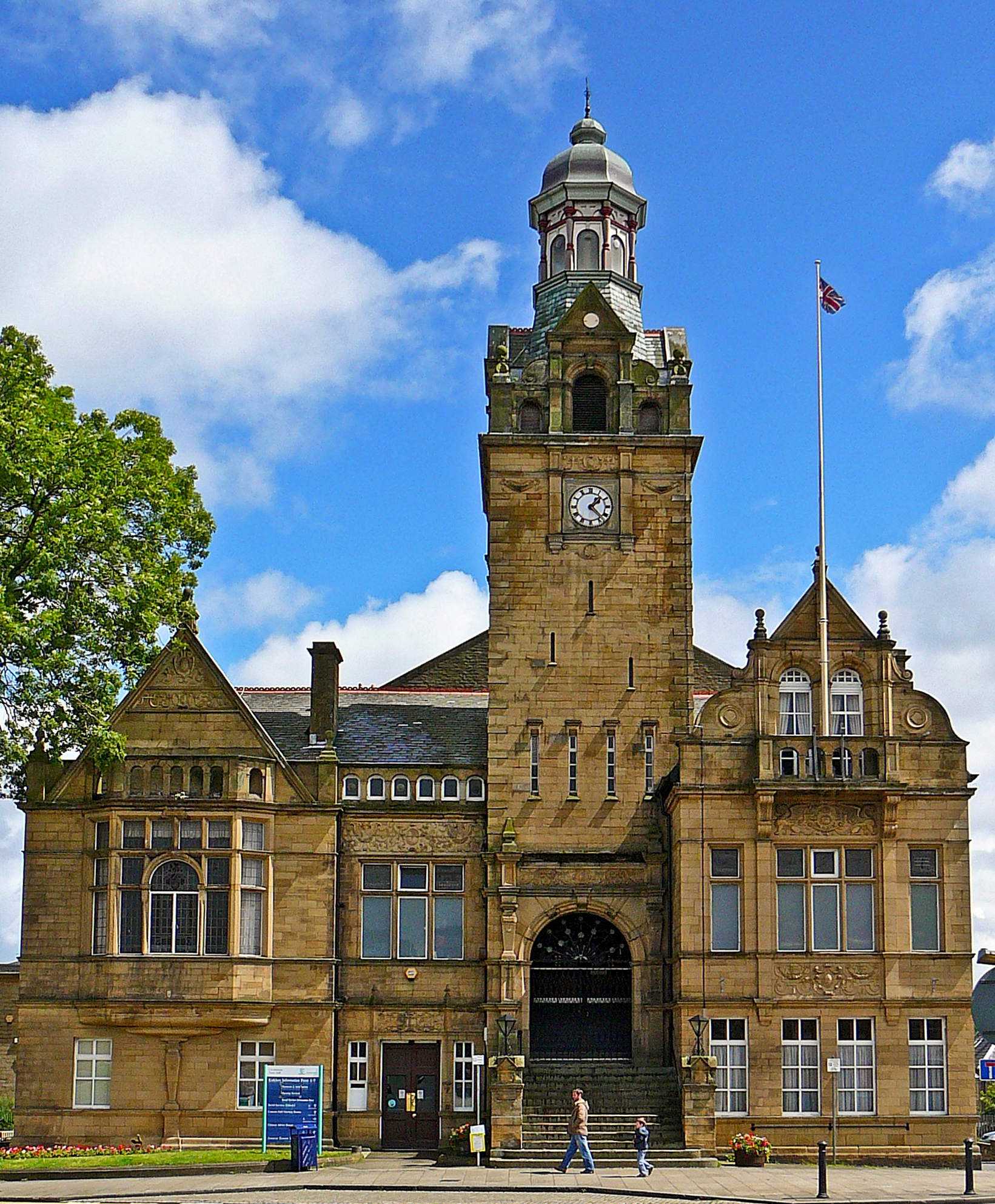
- Area
  - 1921: 4,992 acres (20.20 km^{2})
  - 1961: 8,251 acres (33.39 km^{2})
- Population
  - 1921: 31,117
  - 1971: 40,683
- History
  - Created: 1915
  - Abolished: 1974
  - Succeeded by: Kirklees
- Status: Urban district (1915–1955), municipal borough (1955 on)
- Government: Spenborough Urban District Council (1915–1955), Spenborough Municipal Borough (1955–1974)
  - HQ: Spenborough Town Hall, Cleckheaton
  - Motto: Industry Enriches

Spenborough was, from 1915 to 1974, a local government district in the administrative county of Yorkshire, West Riding, England.

Spenborough was created as an urban district in 1915 by the merger of Cleckheaton, Gomersal and Liversedge urban districts. The amalgamation was carried out at the instigation of Cleckheaton Urban District Council, in order to resist plans by the County Borough of Bradford to annex the area. The name "Spenborough", after the River Spen, was also suggested by Cleckheaton UDC. The district was expanded in 1937 by taking in the abolished Birkenshaw and Hunsworth urban districts, as well as part of the parishes of Clifton and Hartshead from the Halifax Rural District. Attempts to incorporate neighbouring Heckmondwike which is considered to be in the Spen Valley area, were never successful.

On 29 July 1955, it was granted a charter of incorporation creating it a municipal borough.

In 1974, Spenborough was abolished under the Local Government Act 1972, with its area forming part of the Metropolitan Borough of Kirklees, West Yorkshire. Today, Kirklees Council recognises the former Spenborough borough area, with neighbouring Heckmondwike, as the Spen Valley Locality in its structure.

== Legacy ==
Despite the borough's abolition in 1974, the name continues in use in the area. Examples are the Spenborough Guardian, a Cleckheaton-based local newspaper and the Spenborough and District Athletic Club, both in Liversedge.

== See also ==
- Spen Valley (UK Parliament constituency), 1885–1950
- Brighouse and Spenborough (UK Parliament constituency), 1950–1983
- Cleckheaton Town Hall, the meeting place of Spenborough Urban District Council
- P. & C. Garnett Ltd, 19th-century innovators of metallic carding wire and garnetting.
