= Kirklees Priory =

Former priory in Yorkshire, England

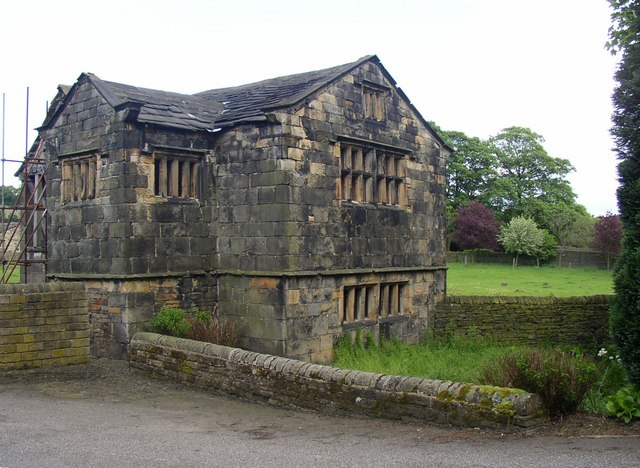
- Kirklees Priory Gate House, all that remains of the original priory.
- Interactive map of Kirklees Priory

Monastery information
- Denomination: Cistercian

Site
- Location: Kirklees Park, Clifton, West Yorkshire
- Country: England
- Coordinates: 53.6951°N 1.7372°W

Kirklees Priory was a Cistercian nunnery whose site is in the present-day Kirklees Park, Clifton near Brighouse, Calderdale, West Yorkshire, England. It was originally in the ancient ecclesiastical parish of Dewsbury. The priory dedicated to the Virgin Mary and St James was founded by Reiner le Fleming, Lord of the manor of Wath upon Dearne, in 1155 during the reign of Henry II.

The priory gives its name to the Kirklees metropolitan district council, formed in 1974 and including the towns of Huddersfield, Dewsbury and Batley, though the priory is just outside the district's boundary itself and is in neighbouring Calderdale.

Nuns from the priory were involved in scandals between 1306 and 1315. Archbishop of York William Greenfield wrote to the prioress about rumours concerning Alice Raggid, Elizabeth Hopton, and Joan Heton. Rumours implied they had been seeing religious and secular men in the nunnery, and their behavior led to the house being considered one of disrepute.

The priory was not dissolved by the Dissolution of the Lesser Monasteries Act in 1535, but continued for worship and hospitality. Cecilia Topcliffe was the prioress, and the convent consisted of the nuns who had been there on 4 February 1536, who continued as before the passing of the Act. In 1539, after the Second Act of Dissolution, Joan Kyppes surrendered the priory, which had eight inmates. At the date of surrender, the whole property was worth £29 18s. 9d. The site was granted to John Tasburgh and Nicholas Savill; the church and priory buildings were demolished, and the stone was used to build Low Hall, now known as Old Farm.

A local inn, The Three Nuns, was named after Cecilia Topclife, Joan Leverthorpe, and Katherine Grace, who sought refuge at the site of a guesthouse of the priory and ran it as a hostelry. The present inn was built in 1939, and the site of the guesthouse is buried under the car park.

All that remains of Kirklees Priory are the long double-aisled barn, and parts of the Old Farm House, calf house, and the gatehouse; all are still standing as Old Farm. They are all Grade I listed buildings. The gatehouse was on Historic England's Heritage at Risk Register, but following extensive repair work was removed from the list.

The landscaping of Kirklees Park was surveyed by the landscape gardener, Francis Richardson, in 1757. It contains a collection of medieval buildings preserved by the Armytage family since the 16th century.

The priory is featured in the medieval legend of Robin Hood. According to the ballad Robin Hood's Death, Robin was killed by the prioress of Kirklees. She was medically treating Robin via bleeding, but treacherously drained too much of his blood instead. A monument in the woods near the River Calder claims to be Robin Hood's Grave.

== See also ==
- Listed buildings in Brighouse
