= Hartshead =

Village in West Yorkshire, England

Coordinates: 53.698°N 1.725°W

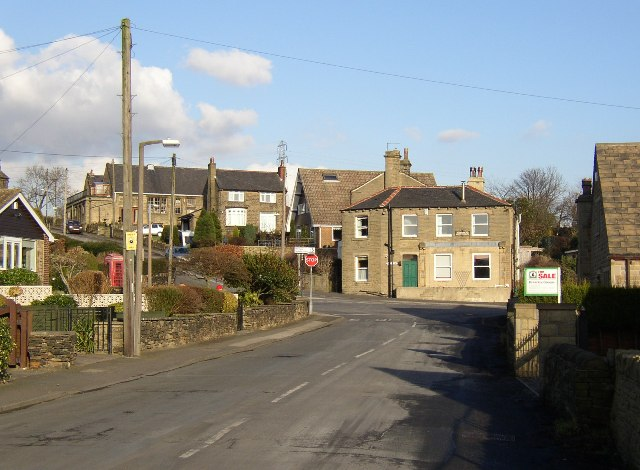
- The centre of Hartshead village

- Location within West Yorkshire
- Metropolitan borough: Kirklees
- Metropolitan county: West Yorkshire
- Region: Yorkshire and the Humber
- Country: England
- Sovereign state: United Kingdom
- Police: West Yorkshire
- Fire: West Yorkshire
- Ambulance: Yorkshire

Hartshead is a village in the Kirklees district of West Yorkshire, England, 3.7 miles (6 km) west of Dewsbury and near to Hartshead Moor.

The village has pre-Norman Conquest origins; the Walton Cross is believed to be dated from the 11th century.

The name Hartshead is derived from Herteshevet or Herteshede which is Scandinavian in origin and means Hill of Heort, Heort meaning Hart in modern English.

Patrick Brontë served as curate of St Peter's Church in Hartshead between 1811 and 1815, in which time he met his wife, Maria Branwell (although they met in Rawdon, some dozen or so miles away from Hartshead). They were married in Guiseley and became the parents of Anne, Branwell, Charlotte and Emily Brontë.

Kirklees Hall is between Hartshead and the nearby village of Clifton.

Robin Hood is reputed to have been buried near Hartshead or in the grounds of the nearby Kirklees Hall. The exact place is not known, as the gravestone has been moved at least 3 times.

== Governance ==
Hartshead was historically a chapelry in the parish of Dewsbury, becoming a civil parish in 1866. In 1931 the parish had a population of 849. On 1 April 1937 the parish was abolished, with most of the area, including the village, being added to the parish of Liversedge in the urban district of Spenborough (which became a borough in 1955). The remainder was added to Brighouse. Spenborough Urban District was abolished in 1974 when Kirklees was created. No successor parish was created for the borough and it became an unparished area.

== See also ==
- Listed buildings in Liversedge and Gomersal
