= Roberttown =

Township in West Yorkshire, England

Coordinates: 53.699°N 1.703°W

- Village street

- Location within West Yorkshire
- Population: (Ward. Liversedge and Gomersal)
- Metropolitan borough: Kirklees
- Metropolitan county: West Yorkshire
- Region: Yorkshire and the Humber
- Country: England
- Sovereign state: United Kingdom
- Post town: LIVERSEDGE
- Postcode district: WF15
- Dialling code: 01924
- Police: West Yorkshire
- Fire: West Yorkshire
- Ambulance: Yorkshire
- UK Parliament: Spen Valley

Roberttown is a village, in the township of Liversedge in Kirklees, West Yorkshire, England and is historically, part of the West Riding of Yorkshire.

== Industry ==
For most of the 1980s and early 1990s Roberttown served as the Headquarters of Halewood International after the company headquarters relocated there from Horbury.

== Religion ==
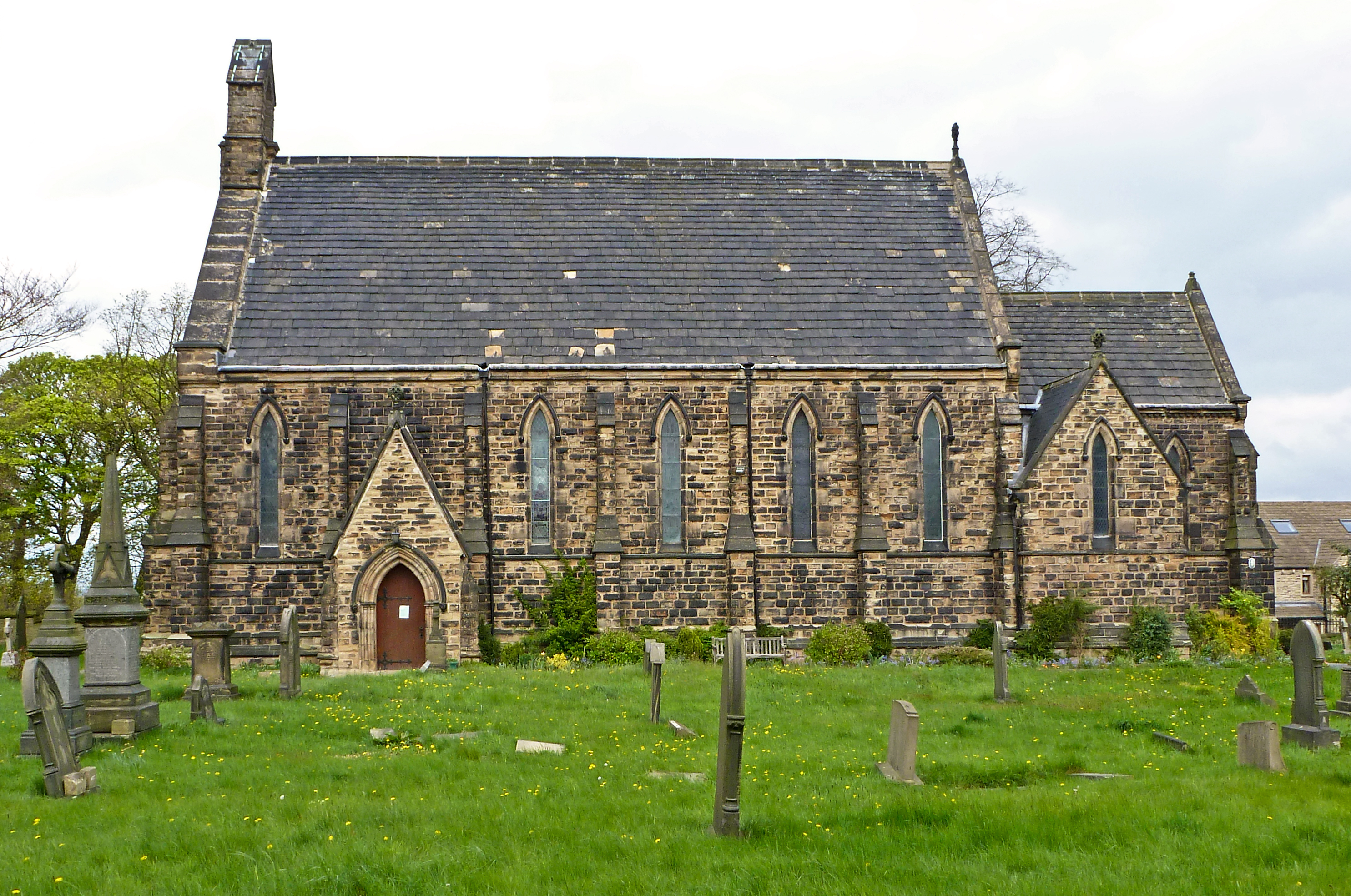
All Saints church

All Saints' is the local Anglican church. It is located on Church Road.

== Education ==
Roberttown C of E Junior and Infant School stands on Church Road not far from All Saints' Church.

== Sport ==
Liversedge Cricket Club have their ground in the village near the New Inn public house on Roberttown Lane. They play in the Central Yorkshire League.

== See also ==
- Listed buildings in Liversedge and Gomersal
