= Listed buildings in Liversedge and Gomersal =

Liversedge is a town and Gomersal is a village, and together with the surrounding area they form a ward in the metropolitan borough of Kirklees, West Yorkshire, England. The ward contains 63 listed buildings that are recorded in the National Heritage List for England. Of these, five are listed at Grade II*, the middle of the three grades, and the others are at Grade II, the lowest grade. In addition to Liversedge and Gomersal, the ward contains the settlements of Hartshead, Hightown, and Roberttown and the surrounding countryside. Most of the listed buildings are houses and associated structures, and farmhouses and farm buildings. There is a Moravian settlement in Gomersal, and some of its buildings are listed. The other listed buildings include churches and chapels and items in churchyards, a cross base, a public house, an obelisk, a mounting block and two sets of stocks, boundary stones, a public hall, and two former toll houses.

== Key ==
Grade	Criteria
II*	Particularly important buildings of more than special interest
II	Buildings of national importance and special interest

== Buildings ==
Name and location	Photograph	Date	Notes	Grade
Walton Cross; 53.71028°N 1.73462°W		Early 9th century (probable)	A cross base in gritstone, it is 4 feet 9 inches (1.45 m) high, rectangular and tapering, and with a socket on the top. There is carving on all the faces, including interlace, figure-of-eight knots, volutes containing birds, and winged beasts.	II*
St Peter's Church, Hartshead; 53.70590°N 1.73030°W		Mid 12th century (probable)	The church retains some Norman material in the tower, the south doorway and the chancel arch, but most of it is the result of a rebuilding in 1880–81 by W. Swinden Barber in Neo-Norman style. The church is built in stone with a stone slate roof, and consists of a nave, north and south aisles, a south porch, a chancel, a north vestry, and a west tower. The tower has a clock face and a slightly corbelled-out embattled parapet. The windows have round-arched heads, and in the roof on the north and south sides is a gabled dormer with a three-light window.	II*
Yew Tree; 53.68717°N 1.72335°W	—	Late 15th or 16th century	A timber framed house that has been altered, it is rendered and has applied timber framing. There is a stone slate roof and two storeys, and the windows are mullioned casements.	II
Barn southwest of Royds Farm; 53.72346°N 1.69248°W	—	16th century (probable)	The barn has a timber framed core, and was later encased in stone, altered and extended. It has a plinth, quoins, and a stone slate roof. There are three bays, a rear aisle, and a lean-to extension on the left. The barn contains a cart entry, a stable door, and a window.	II
Sundial, St Peter's Church; 53.70585°N 1.73013°W		1611	The sundial is in the churchyard to the south of the chancel. It consists of a rectangular stone post with a carved decorative top and a metal gnomon.	II
Sigston House; 53.73460°N 1.68657°W	—	1634	A stone farmhouse with quoins, a tile roof, two storeys and a rear outshut. The windows are mullioned with some mullions removed, and in the outshut is a doorway that has an initialled and dated lintel with an ogee arch.	II
Pogg Myers Farmhouse; 53.70272°N 1.70547°W	—	1638	The farmhouse is in stone, with a stone slate roof and two storeys. On the front is a later porch, the windows are mullioned, and there is a continuous hood mould between the floors.	II
265 Halifax Road, Liversedge; 53.71075°N 1.70620°W	—	17th century	A rendered house, it has a stone slate roof. There are two storeys at the front, and an outshut to the rear with one storey. The windows are mullioned with chamfered surrounds, and recessed.	II
285 Halifax Road, Liversedge; 53.71135°N 1.71004°W	—	17th century	A rendered house, it has a stone slate roof. There are two storeys at the front, and an outshut to the rear with one storey. The windows are mullioned with chamfered surrounds, and recessed, and there is a round-arched blocked fire window.	II
Bullace Trees Farmhouse; 53.70585°N 1.71112°W	—	17th century	A stone farmhouse with quoins, and a stone slate roof with coped gables and moulded kneelers. There are two storeys, an L-shaped plan, and a front of five bays. The windows are mullioned, with some mullions removed, most have hood moulds, and there is a doorway with an arched lintel.	II
Barn, Bullace Trees Farm; 53.70589°N 1.71062°W	—	17th century (or earlier)	The barn is timber framed, with stonework added in the 18th century, and later extensions. There is an outshut on each side, an aisle at the rear, and the barn contains carriage entrances at the front and the rear.	II
Middle Hall Farmhouse; 53.71097°N 1.70487°W	—	17th century	The farmhouse, which was later extended, is rendered, and has a stone slate roof with coped gables. There are two storeys, a front of three gabled bays, and a rear outshut. Some windows have been altered, and the others are mullioned, with some mullions removed.	II
Old Hall Farmhouse; 53.70294°N 1.70077°W		17th century	The farmhouse was extended to the rear in the 18th century. It is in stone, and has a stone slate roof with chamfered gable copings and large finials. There are two storeys and attics, a square plan, and two gables on each front. On the main front is a central doorway with a moulded surround, imposts, and a lintel containing a moulded arched panel. The windows are mullioned, with six lights on the ground floor and eight in the upper floor. There is a continuous hood mould above the windows in both floors. In the left front is a tall stair cross window. and the right front contains a Tudor arched doorway.	II*
Spen Hall and cottages 53.72622°N 1.70354°W	—	17th century (probable)	Originally a large house and three cottages, they date mainly from the 19th century. The buildings are in stone with stone slate roofs, and the cottages have quoins, mullioned windows, and three doorways. The house has an eaves cornice and blocking course, an entrance front of three bays, and a garden front of four bays. The doorway has pilasters and a small cornice, and the windows are sashes, those in the ground floor with aprons.	II
Barn, Windy Bank Farm; 53.71286°N 1.73719°W	—	17th century (or earlier)	The barn has a timber framed core, it was encased in stone in the 18th century, and has been altered. It has quoins and a stone slate roof. There were two outshuts flanking the cart entry, the space was later filled in, and there have been further additions.	II
Barn adjoining Yew Tree; 53.68721°N 1.72317°W	—	17th century	The barn is in stone with a stone slate roof, an outshut to the right, and a continuous outshut at the rear. It has two bays and an aisle at the rear, and contains a square-headed cart entry and some altered openings.	II
Pollard Hall; 53.73139°N 1.68588°W		1659 (or earlier)	The hall house, which was extended in 1889, is in stone, on a plinth, and has a stone slate roof with chamfered gable copings and ornamental finials. There are two storeys and attics, and a front of four gabled bays. On the front is a two-storey porch that has a doorway with a moulded surround and an arched lintel. The windows are mullioned or mullioned and transomed, and include a window with 24 lights. On the left side is a later projecting gabled wing containing a two-storey canted bay window, and at the rear is a single-storey porch and a cross window above.	II*
Red House; 53.73236°N 1.68640°W		1660	The south front of the house was remodelled in the 1740s, the rear was rebuilt in 1995–97, and it has been converted into a museum. The house is built in red brick, with stone quoins and a stone slate roof, hipped to the front. There are two storeys, six bays, and an attached square block to the northeast. The doorway has a semicircular fanlight, it is flanked by canted bay windows, and the other windows are one or two-light sash windows. At the rear of the house are four gables. In the grounds are a two-storey barn and a single-storey coach house, both in stone.	II*
Haigh Hall; 53.71042°N 1.70081°W	—	Late 17th century	The house, which was later extended, is rendered, and has a stone slate roof with chamfered gable copings. There are two storeys and a front of three gabled bays, each gable containing a round-arched blind window, and there is a five-light mullioned window in the upper floor. In the ground floor of the left two bays are three-light windows flanking a doorway with a moulded surround and an ogee-shaped lintel, and in the right bay is a patio door. There are hood moulds over the gable windows, and continuous hood moulds over the openings in both floors.	II
Headlands Hall; 53.70583°N 1.69533°W	—	1690 (probable)	The house, which incorporates timber framing and has been altered, is in stone, and has a stone slate roof with chamfered gable copings and ornamental finials. There are two storeys and a C-shaped plan, with a front of three bays, the outer bays gabled. The central doorway and the windows on the front date from the 19th century, and there is a re-set initialled lintel.	II
Friends' Meeting House; 53.71285°N 1.71399°W		c. 1699	The meeting house was altered in the 19th century and has been converted into a private house. It is rendered, and has a stone slate roof, two storeys, and a rear outshut. The doorway is near the centre, and the windows are sashes.	II
Albion Inn; 53.71316°N 1.69385°W		Late 17th or early 18th century	The public house, which has been altered, is rendered, and has a stone slate roof, three storeys, and a double pile plan. The windows are mullioned with some mullions removed, and on the front is a stair window.	II
Duxbury Hall and Cottage; 53.70483°N 1.69600°W	—	17th or early 18th century	The hall was later extended and divided. It is in stone with quoins, and a stone slate roof with coped gables on moulded kneelers with ornamental finials. In the centre is a doorway with a Classical surround and a fanlight. There are two storeys and three gabled bays. The left and middle bays contain mullioned windows, the right bay has been converted into a cottage, and at the rear is a 19th-century cottage.	II
Lane Side House; 53.72919°N 1.67857°W	—	17th or early 18th century	A stone house, partly rendered, with quoins, and a stone slate roof with chamfered gable copings on carved kneelers. There are two storeys, four bays, and a rear outshut. In the third bay is a gabled two-storey porch, the upper floor corbelled out, and the windows are mullioned.	II
Stubley Farmhouse (right part); 53.71937°N 1.67701°W	—	Early 18th century	The farmhouse, which has been altered, is in stone with quoins and a stone slate roof. There are two storeys, and an L-shaped plan. The doorway has a chamfered surround, and the windows are mullioned, with some mullions removed.	II
Roe Head; 53.69224°N 1.71164°W		1740	A house, later extended and used as a school, it is in stone with a stone slate roof. The original block has three storeys and sides of five bays, the extension has two storeys, with a block of two bays and a block at right angles with four bays, and in the angle is a canted two-storey porch. On the west front are two large three-light bow windows, in the extension is a bow window with five lights, and most of the other windows are sashes.	II
Healds Hall; 53.71186°N 1.68635°W	—	1764	A house in Georgian style, later a hotel, it is in stone, with a bracketed eaves cornice, and a hipped roof. There are three storeys, a symmetrical front of five bays, and flanking single-storey wings. Three steps lead up to the central doorway that has a moulded surround, a pulvinated frieze, and a segmental pediment on consoles. The windows are sashes, those in the middle floor with cornices, and the central window has an architrave, a pulvinated frieze, and a triangular pediment.	II
119 Hartshead Lane, Hartshead; 53.69917°N 1.72459°W		Late 18th century (probable)	Originally a pair of mirror image houses, later combined, it is in stone with quoins, and a stone slate roof with chamfered gable copings on cut kneelers. There are two storeys and a symmetrical front, with doors in the outer parts, the left door blocked. The windows are mullioned, and on the front is a decorative datestone, probably reset.	II
44 Listing Lane and 1 Listing Drive, Liversedge; 53.71414°N 1.68953°W	—	Late 18th century	Two houses on a corner site at right angles. 1 Listing Drive is the older, with 44 Listing Lane dating from the early 19th century. The houses are in stone with quoins, and have stone slate roofs and two storeys. Each house has a central doorway and three-light mullioned windows.	II
120 and 122 Church Road, Roberttown; 53.70139°N 1.71309°W		Late 18th century	A pair of mirror image cottages, they are rendered, and have quoins and a stone slate roof. The two doorways are in the middle, and the windows are mullioned with three lights.	II
Clough House; 53.71217°N 1.71467°W		Late 18th century	A stone house in a row, on a plinth, with quoins, and a stone slate roof with a coped gable on the left. There are three storeys and a symmetrical front of three bays. In the centre is a doorway with a fanlight and a cornice, above it is a plaque recording the residence of Rev. Patrick Brontë in the house, and the windows are paired. At the rear is a central doorway, a staircase window, and three-light mullioned windows.	II
Parkinhole; 53.69490°N 1.71673°W	—	Late 18th century	A stone cottage with quoins and a stone slate roof. There are two storeys and a small lean-to on the left. In the centre is a doorway, and the windows are mullioned with three lights.	II
The Dumb Steeple; 53.68595°N 1.73164°W		Late 18th century (probable)	A stone obelisk consisting of a square column with three reducing stages, surmounted by large ball finial. In the top stage are two recesses. It is about 15 feet (4.6 m) high.	II
Thornbush Farm; 53.70961°N 1.72904°W	—	Late 18th century	Additions have been made to the farm buildings, and some are now in ruin. They are in stone with some brick, they have stone slate roofs, and two storeys. The buildings contain doorways, some of which are blocked, and windows, some of which have a single light and others are mullioned.	II
Sister's Houses; 53.72269°N 1.68840°W	—	1798	A terrace of three houses, formerly a school, they are in red brick with stone quoins and stone slate roofs. The houses have two storeys, and the middle house is taller and slightly recessed, with three bays and sash windows with stone lintels. The outer houses have four bays each, and sash windows with keystones. The doorways have architraves, fanlights and small cornices.	II
177 Quarry Road, Gomersal; 53.72379°N 1.68522°W		Late 18th to early 19th century	The cottage, which is attached to a church and is part of a Moravian settlement, is in red brick with stone quoins, and a stone slate roof with coped gables on kneelers. There are two storeys and two bays. The doorway has a fanlight and a cornice, and the windows are sashes; the openings have stone surrounds.	II
179, 181 and 183 Quarry Road, Gomersal; 53.72391°N 1.68547°W	—	Late 18th to early 19th century	A terrace of three houses, part of a Moravian settlement, they are rendered and have a stone slate roof. The houses have three storeys, and each house has two bays. In the middle house is a mullioned window, and the other windows are sashes.	II
189 Quarry Road, Gomersal; 53.72400°N 1.68510°W	—	Late 18th to early 19th century	The cottage, which is attached to a church and is part of a Moravian settlement, is in red brick with stone quoins, and a stone slate roof with coped gables on kneelers. There are two storeys and two bays. The doorway has a fanlight and a cornice, and the windows are sashes; the openings have stone surrounds.	II
Mounting block 53.70568°N 1.72979°W		18th or 19th century	The mounting block is on the east side of Church Lane opposite the gates to St Peter's Church. It consists of slabs of stone arranged to make four steps and a square platform.	II
Stocks opposite St Peter's Church; 53.70566°N 1.72981°W		18th or 19th century	The stocks are on the east side of Church Lane opposite the gates to St Peter's Church. They consist of two stone posts with pointed tops and grooves on the inner faces for a stone lower rail and a timber upper rail.	II
Stocks, Halifax Road; 53.71078°N 1.70175°W	—	18th or 19th century	The stocks are on the north side of Halifax Road outside No. 206. They consist of two large square stone posts with slots for the rails, which are now missing.	II
Christ Church, Liversedge; 53.71186°N 1.69414°W		1812–16	The church was designed by Thomas Taylor in Perpendicular style. It is built in stone with a slate roof, and consists of a nave with a clerestory, north and south aisles, a chancel with a chapel and a vestry, and a west tower. The tower has four stages and angle buttresses, a south doorway and a blocked west doorway, and an embattled parapet with crocketed pinnacles. On the body of the church are embattled parapets, and buttresses that rise to gabled pinnacles.	II
Moravian Sunday School; 53.72348°N 1.68482°W		1816–20	The Sunday school was built as part of the Moravian settlement. It is in red brick with stone dressings, and has a slate roof with coped gables. There is one storey and six bays. Along the sides are round-arched windows with voussoirs and keystones, and the windows in the outer bays, which were originally doorways, have moulded surrounds.	II
Crowtrees and pump 53.72874°N 1.68326°W	—	1819 (probable)	A stone house on a plinth, with quoins, an eaves band, and a hipped slate roof. There are two storeys, three bays, and a rear wing. Steps lead up to a central doorway with a fanlight, a fluted frieze, and a cornice, and the windows on the front are sashes. In the centre of the rear is a tall round-arched stair window, and in the wing are mullioned windows with some mullions removed. In the rear garden is a dated and initialled pump.	II
Grove Congregational Church and Sunday School; 53.73345°N 1.68595°W		1825–26	The church and Sunday school are in stone with stone slate roofs. The church has a plinth, a floor band, two storeys, a front of three bays, and sides of five bays. The front is pedimented with an oculus in the tympanum. In the centre is a doorway with an architrave, a rectangular fanlight, a frieze, and a cornice, and the windows have round-arched heads. The Sunday school forms a wing at the rear, it has a hipped roof, two storeys and round-arched sash windows.	II
Walls, gate piers and gates, Grove Congregational Church; 53.73336°N 1.68641°W	—	c. 1825–26	A dwarf stone wall runs in front of the forecourt of the church. In the centre is a pair of panelled gate piers with cornice caps, and the gates are in cast iron with ornamental cresting.	II
121 Hartshead Lane, Hartshead; 53.69918°N 1.72447°W		Early 19th century (or earlier)	A stone house with a stone slate roof and two storeys. There are two doorways, the left doorway is blocked and has a chamfered surround and an inscribed and dated Tudor arched lintel. The windows are mullioned, with some mullions removed.	II
Barn adjoining 120 Church Road, Roberttown; 53.70135°N 1.71295°W		Early 19th century	The barn is in stone with a stone slate roof. In the centre is an entrance with an elliptical arch, to the sides are doorways, and above are two circular pitching holes.	II
124 and 124A Church Road, Roberttown; 53.70135°N 1.71326°W		Early 19th century	A pair of cottages in a group, they are rendered, and have a stone slate roof. There are two storeys and a rear outshut. The two doorways are near the centre, and the windows are mullioned, with some mullions removed.	II
Boundary stone, Freakfield Lane, Hartshead; 53.70233°N 1.73738°W		Early 19th century	The boundary stone is on the north side of Freakfield Lane. It consists of a stone with a rounded top inscribed with "H" (for Hartshead).	II
Hill Top House; 53.72959°N 1.68488°W	—	Early 19th century	A large house, later extended, it is in stone with rusticated quoins, moulded eaves cornices, and hipped stone slate roofs. Both parts have two storeys and contain sash windows. The earlier part has a symmetrical front of three bays and a central doorway with a semicircular fanlight. The later part projects to the left, it has two bays, and contains a similar doorway.	II
Base of lamp, Roe Head; 53.69199°N 1.71140°W	—	Early 19th century (probable)	The lamp base is in cast iron on a base of chamfered stone. The base of the lamp is moulded with consoles. The shaft is fluted and has palmette decoration at the base, and a moulded cap with spouts, and a top in the form of a flattened urn.	II
Gomersal Methodist Church; 53.73419°N 1.69047°W		1827–28	The church is in stone with a string course, a moulded eaves cornice and blocking course, and a hipped roof. There are two storeys and a front of six bays, the middle four bays projecting and bowed. The middle bays contain small-pane windows, and in the recessed outer bays are round-headed doorways with fanlights.	II
The Old School, Hartshead; 53.70617°N 1.72995°W		c. 1828	A building in the churchyard of St Peter's Church, it was formerly either a schoolroom or a hearse house. It is in stone, and has a stone slate roof with a coped gable to the east. There is one storey and a single cell. The central doorway has a pointed arch and a hood mould, and is flanked by three-light windows with round-arched lights. In the gable end facing the road is a large blocked doorway with a pointed arch and a hood mould.	II
Barn to rear of 45 and 47 Church Lane, Gomersal; 53.72970°N 1.68083°W	—	Early to mid 19th century	The barn is in stone with quoins, a plinth at the rear, plain gutter brackets, and a hipped stone slate roof. There are three bays, the middle bay projecting under a coped pediment. In the middle bay is a round-arched entrance with a keystone, and above it is a lunette. The outer bays contain doorways and circular pitching holes above.	II
120 Hartshead Lane, Hartshead; 53.69888°N 1.72445°W	—	Early to mid 19th century	A stone house with a stone slate roof and two storeys. The doorway is in the centre, and the windows are mullioned with three lights, one window partly blocked.	II
Boundary stone, Oxford Road, Gomersal; 53.71825°N 1.68124°W		Early to mid 19th century	The stone marks the boundary between Gomersal and Heckmondwike and stands on the west side of Oxford Road (A651 road). It consists of a stone with a rounded top inscribed with a vertical line and the names of the two settlements.	II
The Bar House; 53.71866°N 1.68127°W		c. 1840	The former toll house, which was later extended to the rear, is in stone with a hipped slate roof. There is one storey, and the house is canted to the road. The doorway has a chamfered surround and a cambered head, and the windows have two lights with pointed heads. In the extension are mullioned windows.	II
St Mary's Church, Gomersal; 53.72921°N 1.68883°W		1850–51	The church is in stone with a stone slate roof, and is in Gothic Revival style. It consists of a nave, north and south aisles, a south porch, a south transept, a chancel, and a northwest tower. The tower has three stages, diagonal buttresses, clock faces on three sides, gargoyles, and an openwork parapet with tall crocketed pinnacles on corbels carved with heads and beasts. The west window has four lights and the east window has five.	II
Gomersal Public Hall; 53.73286°N 1.68682°W		1850–52	Originally a mechanics' institution, the hall is in stone, the ground floor rusticated, with rusticated quoins, a deep eaves cornice on carved brackets, and a hipped slate roof. There are two storeys and a symmetrical front of five bays. In the centre is a porch with a round-arched doorway, and a heavy cornice with a balustraded balcony carried on massive consoles and a keystone. The windows are sashes in architraves, and in the upper floor they have segmental pediments on elaborate console brackets, and blind balustrades.	II
Toll House; 53.70529°N 1.69526°W		Mid to late 19th century	The former toll house is in stone, with moulded gutter brackets, and a hipped slate roof. There is one storey, and a square plan with a projecting five-sided bay facing the road. In the centre is a doorway with a fanlight, the other bays and the rest of the house contain sash windows, and all have ogee-shaped hood moulds.	II
Moravian Church; 53.72390°N 1.68515°W		1869–70	The church is in red brick with stone dressings, and a slate roof with coped gables. There are two storeys, and a gabled wing to the right with a Tudor arched doorway. Most of the windows are mullioned and transomed. There are also three transomed lancet windows that rise to form gabled dormers, and on the roof is a bellcote.	II
Boundary stone opposite Three Nuns Public House; 53.68610°N 1.72701°W		Late 19th century	The boundary stone is on the south side of Leeds Road (A62 road), and marks the boundary between the districts of Halifax and Mirfield. It consists of a stone post with a rounded top, inscribed with the names of the districts.	II
