= Halifax Rural District =

Former local government area in the UK

Coordinates: 53°43′N 1°49′W

Halifax
- Area
  - 1911: 6,523 acres (26.40 km^{2})
  - 1931: 6,523 acres (26.40 km^{2})
- Population
  - 1901: 6,476
  - 1931: 6,001
- History
  - Origin: Rural sanitary district
  - Created: 1894
  - Abolished: 1937
  - Succeeded by: Municipal Borough of Brighouse, Elland Urban District, County Borough of Huddersfield, Sowerby Bridge Urban District, Spenborough Urban District
- Status: Rural district
- Government: Halifax Rural District Council
  - HQ: Halifax

Halifax was, from 1894 to 1937, a rural district in the administrative county of Yorkshire, West Riding, England.

The district was created by the Local Government Act 1894 as successor to the Halifax Rural Sanitary District, and was abolished by a county review order under the Local Government Act 1929 in 1937.

== Area ==
The district initially consisted of seven civil parishes surrounding, but not including, the town of Halifax. The district was in four portions, divided from each other by various urban districts and municipal boroughs. In 1899 the parish of Skircoat was absorbed by the County Borough of Halifax, and the rural district consisted of the following parishes until abolition:

Parish	Notes	Fate in 1937
Clifton	Together with Hartshead formed an area to the east of Halifax	Split between boroughs of Brighouse (2,089 acres (8.45 km^{2})) and Spenborough (73 acres (0.30 km^{2}))
Fixby	Parish formed an isolated area to the south of Halifax	Most (660 acres (2.7 km^{2})) passed to County Borough of Huddersfield, part (184 acres (0.74 km^{2})) to Elland UD
Hartshead	Together with Clifton formed an area to the east of Halifax	Most passed to Borough of Spenborough (881 acres (3.57 km^{2})) part to Borough of Brighouse (27 acres (0.11 km^{2}))
Norland	Together with Upper Greetland formed an area to the south east of Halifax	Merged with Luddenden Foot and Sowerby UDs to form Sowerby Bridge UD
Norwood Green and Coley	Parish formed an isolated area north east of Halifax	Absorbed by Borough of Brighouse
Upper Greetland	Together with Norland formed an area to the south west of Halifax	Absorbed by Elland UD
