= Brighouse Town Hall =

Municipal building in Brighouse, West Yorkshire, England

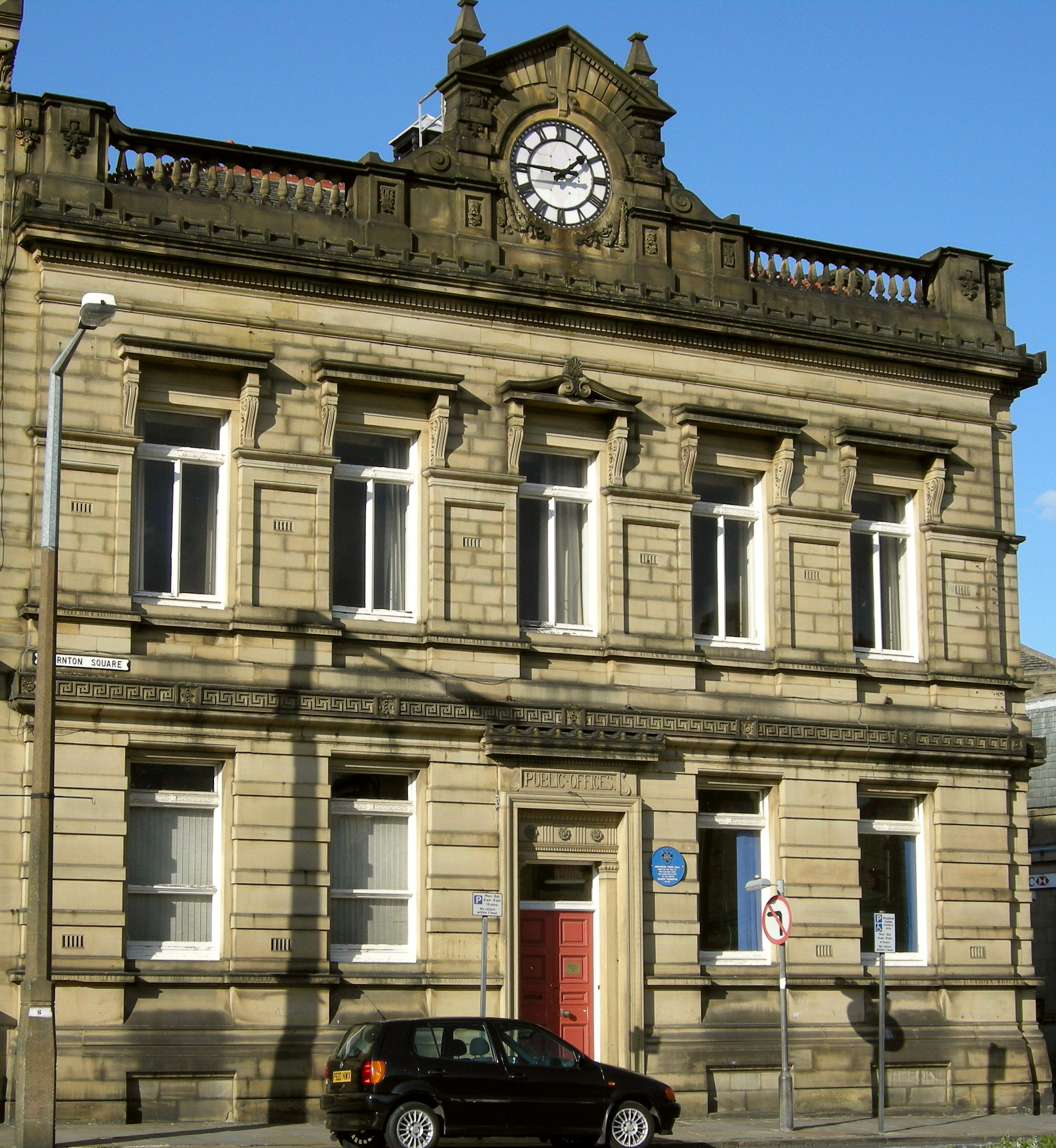
- Brighouse Town Hall

- Shown in West Yorkshire
- 53.7014°N 1.7817°W
- Location: Thornton Square, Brighouse

History
- Built: 1887

Site notes
- Architect: John Lord
- Architectural style: Neoclassical style

Listed Building – Grade II
- Official name: Town Hall
- Designated: 2 December 1983
- Reference no.: 1133856

Brighouse Town Hall is a former municipal building in Thornton Square, Brighouse, West Yorkshire, England. The town hall, which was the headquarters of Brighouse Borough Council, is a Grade II listed building.

== History ==
The first town hall in Brighouse was a building on the corner of Bradford Road and Bethel Street which had been designed by Mallinson and Barber as a public hall and opened by Sir George John Armytage, 6th Baronet on 14 October 1868. (Note: This building survives and is now known as "Brighouse Civic Hall".) After the responsibilities of the township expanded, civic leaders decided to procure municipal offices: the site they selected was an old malt kiln on the north side of Briggate.

The new building, which was designed by John Lord in the neoclassical style, was officially opened on 16 March 1887. The design involved a symmetrical main frontage with five bays facing onto Briggate; the central bay featured a doorway flanked by pilasters supporting a lintel with an entablature above inscribed with the words "Public Offices". There were sash windows in the other bays on the ground floor and in all the bays on the first floor. Internally, the principal room was the council chamber on the first floor which contained a chairman's chair with a finely carved reredos behind.

The building became the headquarters of Brighouse Municipal Borough in 1894 and it hosted the future Prime Minister, Winston Churchill, when he gave a speech to Liberal Party supporters on 6 December 1904. The town hall was further enhanced when the mayor, Alderman Robert Thornton, presented a large Cambridge-chiming clock (informally known as "Owd Bob"), manufactured by Potts & Sons, which was installed in the centre of a new open pediment and balustrade at a ceremony on 9 November 1914. The area in front of the town hall, which had been occupied by Holroyd Buildings, was later renamed Thornton Square in his honour. The young men of Brighouse were called up at the town hall during the First World War.

The building ceased to be the local seat of government when the enlarged Calderdale Metropolitan Borough Council was formed in 1974. The chime of bells, which Thornton had presented to the town at the same time as the clock, was removed from the town hall and placed in storage at that time. The mayor's mace was also removed and transferred to Halifax Town Hall where it was placed in the mayor's parlour.

After renting the building out to small businesses for many years, in December 2010, civic leaders decided that the town hall was surplus to requirements and the furniture in the council chamber, including the council chairman's chair and the carved reredos, were removed from the building and installed in the civic hall so that the town hall could be sold. The building was sold to a private buyer in March 2011 and, after a programme of conversion works, it re-opened as the Town Hall Dental practice in 2012.

== See also ==
- Listed buildings in Brighouse
