= Robin Hood's Grave =

Monument in West Yorkshire, England

Coordinates: 53.6897°N 1.737°W

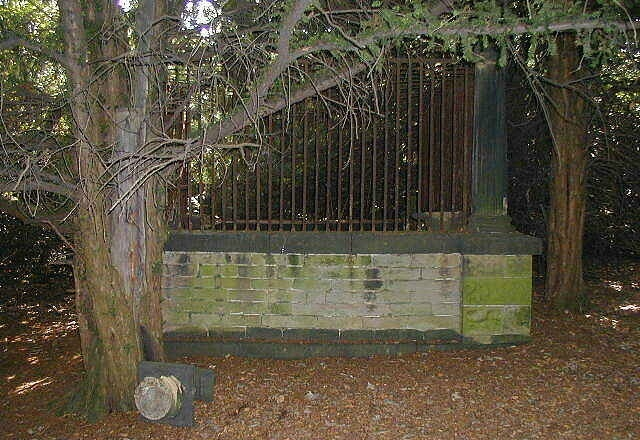
Robin Hood's Grave (pictured 2001)

Robin Hood's Grave is the name given to a monument in Kirklees Park Estate, West Yorkshire, England, near the now-ruined Kirklees Priory. It is alleged to be the burial place of English folk hero Robin Hood.

== Legend ==
In "A Gest of Robyn Hode", one of the oldest surviving Robin Hood ballads, Robin is said to have died at "Kyrkesley", murdered by an unnamed prioress and Sir Roger of Doncaster, but the full circumstances of his death are not related.

A later ballad known as "Robin Hood's Death" (first recorded in the 17th century) contains the story which has now become the traditional account. Suffering from an illness, Robin seeks help from a kinswoman of his, the prioress of "Churchlees" or "Kirkly". She makes a pretence of healing him by letting his blood, and deliberately allows him to bleed to death. In another version of this ballad, first recorded in 1786, Robin's final act is to fire an arrow from the window of his room, telling his companion Little John to bury him at the spot where the arrow falls. Later embellishments of the story add that Robin's first arrow landed in running water, so a second shot had to be fired.

== Monument ==
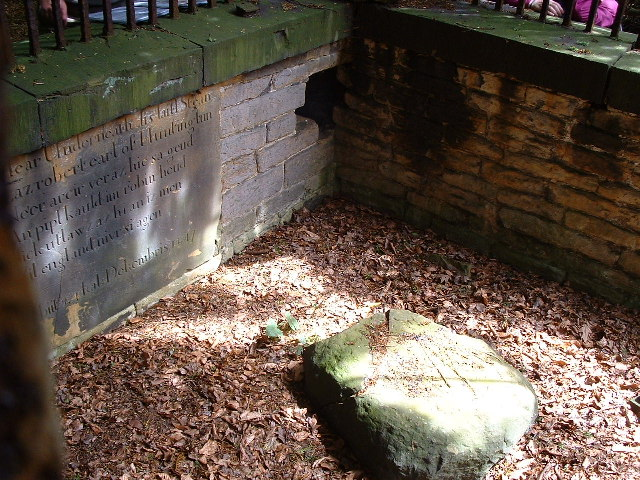
Stone and inscription

The monument known as Robin Hood's Grave is located in a privately owned woodland, 650 metres from the gatehouse of the former Kirklees Priory. This gatehouse, which is still standing, is where Robin Hood is thought to have been staying at the time of his death.

The epitaph on the monument reads:

Hear Underneath dis laitl stean
Laz robert earl of Huntingtun
Ne'er arcir ver az hie sa geud
An pipl Kauld im robin heud
Sick utlawz az hi an iz men
Vil england nivr si agen
Obiit 24 Kal Dekembris 1247

This can be translated into modern English as follows:

Here underneath this little stone
Lies Robert, Earl of Huntingdon
Never archer were as he so good
And people called him Robin Hood
Such outlaws as he and his men
Will England never see again
Obit: 24 December 1247AD

Historian Maurice Keen describes this inscription as "clearly spurious", observing that the language in which it is written is unlike any variety of English ever spoken. Additionally, there is no such date as the 24th Kalend of December.

An epitaph matching the one carved on the monument was found among the papers of Thomas Gale, Dean of York, upon his death in 1702. A very similar epitaph is found appended to the 1632 ballad "The True Tale of Robin Hood", by Martin Parker.

== History ==
Although the inscription is probably a forgery, there may have been a grave marker on this site as early as the 16th century.

John Leland, in his Collectanea (compiled in the 1530s), mentions the tradition that Robin Hood is buried near Kirklees Priory, but the earliest definite reference to the presence of a gravestone is found in Richard Grafton's Chronicle at Large (1569). Grafton wrote that after Robin's death, the prioress "caused him to be buried by the high way side ... And upon his grave the sayde Prioresse did lay a very fayre stone, wherin the names of Robert Hood, William of Goldesborough and others were graven ... And at eyther end of the sayde Tombe was erected a crosse of stone, which is to be seene there at this present." However, Grafton (probably due to the misreading of a capital K) gives the name of the priory as "Bircklies", and his reference to the grave is likely based on hearsay.

In Philemon Holland's English translation of William Camden's Britannia (1607), "the tombe of Robin Hood" is mentioned in passing as situated near Kirklees Priory. A sketch made by Nathaniel Johnston in 1665 shows a stone bearing the same inscription as that described by Grafton. In the early 1700s, Ralph Thoresby wrote that he had seen the stone, but the inscription was barely legible. Richard Gough, in 1786, wrote that the stone marking the grave was "broken and much defaced, the inscription illegible". He reports that a former landowner had excavated the spot, and found that the earth below the stone had never been disturbed. Gough's illustration of this stone does not match up with the description provided by Grafton.

The gravestone now on this spot is surrounded by a low stone wall and fence. This is said to have been erected in the 19th century, to prevent local workers from carrying away pieces of the stone, which they believed to be a cure for toothache. However, the stone may have been enclosed earlier than this.

In 2015, the crew of the TV show Expedition Unknown conducted an investigation into the authenticity of this grave, with the aid of ground-penetrating radar. They found no indications of ground disturbance to indicate a burial.
