= Clifton, West Yorkshire =

Village in West Yorkshire, England

Coordinates: 53.7023°N 1.7606°W

Clifton
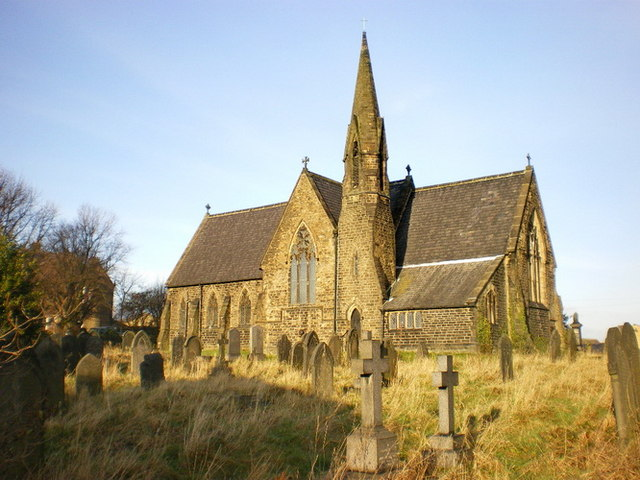
- St John's Church

- Location within West Yorkshire
- OS grid reference: SE159229
- Metropolitan borough: Calderdale
- Metropolitan county: West Yorkshire
- Region: Yorkshire and the Humber
- Country: England
- Sovereign state: United Kingdom
- Post town: Brighouse
- Postcode district: HD6
- Dialling code: 01484
- Police: West Yorkshire
- Fire: West Yorkshire
- Ambulance: Yorkshire
- UK Parliament: Calder Valley

Clifton is a village on the eastern outskirts of Brighouse in the Calderdale district of West Yorkshire, England.

== History ==
Clifton is mentioned as Cliftone in the Domesday Book. The entry reads

In Cliftone Escelf has seven carucates of land … where four ploughs may be….

The manor was one of two hundred manors granted by William the Conqueror to the Norman noble, Ilbert de Laci. The early Lords of the Manor lived at Clifton Hall (which was down Well Lane) and Cross Hall (later called Highley Hall). Remnants of the early ‘strip’ farming remain in the fields known as ‘The Acres’.

Clifton was historically a chapelry in the ancient parish of Dewsbury. It became a separate civil parish in 1866. From 1837 it formed part of the Halifax Poor Law Union and therefore became part of the Halifax Rural District when it was created in 1894. The parish of Clifton was abolished in 1937. Most of the parish, including the village itself, was added to the parish and Municipal Borough of Brighouse. Smaller areas were transferred to the parishes of Cleckheaton and Liversedge in the urban district of Spenborough. At the 1931 census (the last before the abolition of the parish), Clifton had a population of 2199. The borough of Brighouse was abolished in 1974, becoming part of Calderdale. No successor parish was created for the former borough and so Clifton is directly administered by Calderdale Council.

== Governance ==
Clifton is a village in the Brighouse ward of Calderdale, a metropolitan borough in the ceremonial county of West Yorkshire, England.

== Geography ==
The village is on the north side of the valley of the River Calder and the plateau adjoining it.

The village is on the route of the Calderdale Way. This is a 50-mile circular walk around the hills and valleys of Calderdale.

== Culture and community ==
Wakefield Road, Clifton, West Yorkshire

There are two public houses at either end of the main street (Towngate). One, the Black Horse Inn, was the Yorkshire Post pub restaurant of 2006. The other is the Armytage Arms. Clifton also has a small hairdressing salon.

The Clifton Village Community Association (CVCA) organises local events, in recent years has added a new memorial stone to men lost in WWII associated with Clifton Village war memorial railings and the village play park. In addition to restoring and managing the former telephone kiosk, the CVCA has oversight of local issues.

The Clifton Village Neighbourhood Forum (CVNF) was granted recognition by Calderdale Council on 1 August 2018 to produce a neighbourhood plan for Clifton Village.

Clifton also gives its name to the Clifton & Lightcliffe brass band. It is one of the country's oldest, formed in 1838. The band headquarters is in nearby Bailiff Bridge.

== Landmarks ==
There are many local historical references connected to drift mining. It was first recorded in 1307 and also mentioned by Daniel Defoe, author of Robinson Crusoe, in his 1727 book 'A Tour Of Great Brittain'. On the western flank of the village is a long straight ridge, which constitutes the remains of a gravity railway that was last used to transport coal in 1920 to the municipal gasworks by the Calder and Hebble Navigation at Brighouse.

There are also intriguing historical connections such as America Lane, the fever hospital and Clifton 'airport' used by Sir Alan Cobham's Air Circus between the two world wars. The remains of the village well can be seen opposite the school.

At the easterly edge of the village is the 16th-century Kirklees Hall, whose grounds contain the reputed grave of Robin Hood. It was the model for 'Nunwood' in Charlotte Brontë's novel 'Shirley'. At the northerly end of the village, there remains evidence of strip farming, also known as 'open field system'. Originally, there were 32 strips of land and families would work two or three. Beyond were fields known as the Doles, common grazing land.

Doles Lane, a public right of way, still exists and starts (as Well Lane), opposite the Black Horse Inn a meeting place for Luddites, the machine wreckers, in the early 19th century. Highley Hall (formerly Crosse Hall), near the war memorial, was a farm until the 1990s. Originally the family home of Richard de Hileagh, constable of the village in the mid-14th century; it is now again a private residence.

== Education ==
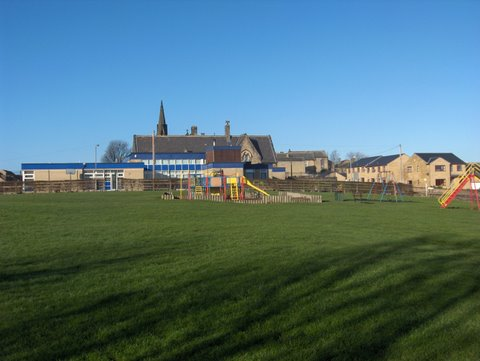
Clifton School viewed from across the recreation ground.

The village, a 'Village Design Statement' area, has a junior and infant school, St John's Primary Academy, originally built in the 1870s. It is a top-performing school, which was called 'outstanding' in successive Ofsted inspections such as in 2014. It was 7th best in England for SATS level 5 in December 2007. The academy has had many names, but was first called Clifton School, but now it is called St. John's CE Primary Academy, Clifton.

== Religious sites ==
There is an Anglican church (first baptism Goldthorpe Squire 1859, first burial Zillah Ramsden 1860) within the Church of England Diocese of Leeds, and a Methodist church. Patrick Brontë, father of the novelist sisters, was Minister at the nearby Hartshead-cum-Clifton church.

== Sport ==
Adjacent to the village is Willow Valley Golf Club. Each June, the club hosts the annual Yorkshire PGA Championship.

== See also ==
- Listed buildings in Brighouse
