= Kirklees Hall =

Jacobean hall in West Yorkshire, England

Coordinates: 53°41′46″N 1°44′34″W

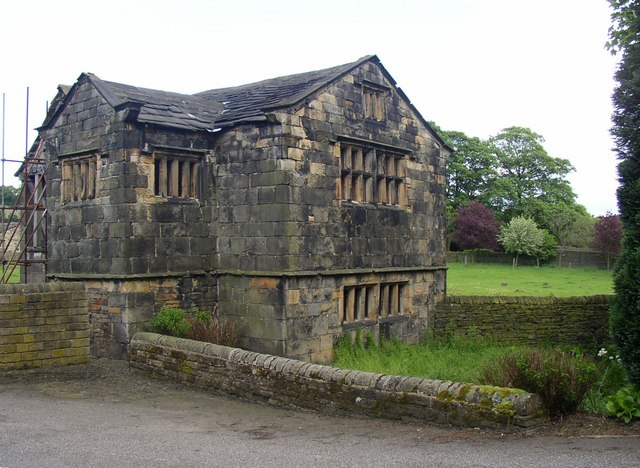
Kirklees Hall Gatehouse

Kirklees Hall is a 16th-century Grade I listed Jacobean hall, close to the English village of Clifton in Calderdale, West Yorkshire.

The first evidence of a hall constructed at Kirklees was that of Sir Thomas Gargrave, who conveyed the property to the Pilkington family.

After the estate was acquired by the up-and-coming Armytage family, the stone built hall was altered c.1770 by John Carr for the Sir George Armytage, 3rd Baronet. The Armytage family went on to occupy the hall for several generations.

Lady Armytage (d: 2008 aged 81), sold the property in 1983 and moved into Priory Gardens a property she built within Kirklees Park estate adjacent to Old Farm (formerly Low Hall) and the Kirklees Priory site. The former gatehouse part of the Old Farm (Low Hall) complex can still be seen, though the site is on private land and has no public access.

Kirklees Hall and grounds designed after Francis Richardson are now a collection of homes set in 18 acres and are annexed from Kirklees Park estate which are private with no public access.

== Robin Hood associations ==
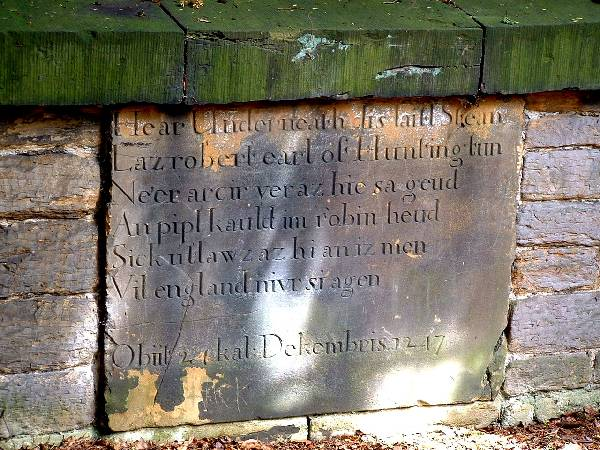
Robin Hood's grave

In the 12th century, the Cistercians built Kirklees Priory. It is connected to the legend of Robin Hood as it is said to be his final resting place. In the folklore song Geste it is said that Robin Hood was the nephew of the prioress, who sheltered him when he was fleeing from the Sheriff of Nottingham. She drained his blood (as was a common medicinal practice in those days). She drained too much and he died. Though one can not be certain of her intentions, local folklore tells us that it was murder. The site of Robin Hood's Grave is marked on the local Ordnance Survey map.

The grave is located a short distance from the building where Robin Hood died, although archery experts have stated that the distance covered would not have been possible with bows of that time, never mind Robin's strength in his last moments. The grave is clearly marked as belonging to Robin Hood. The priory gatehouse and grave are located on private land.
