= Ballad stanza =

Four-line poetic verse, known as a quatrain

In poetry, a ballad stanza is a type of a four-line stanza, known as a quatrain, most often found in the folk ballad. The ballad stanza consists of a total of four lines, with the first and third lines written in the iambic tetrameter and the second and fourth lines written in the iambic trimeter with a rhyme scheme of ABCB. Assonance in place of rhyme is common. Samuel Taylor Coleridge adopted the ballad stanza in The Rime of the Ancient Mariner.

All in a hot and copper sky!
The bloody Sun, at noon,
Right up above the mast did stand,
No bigger than the Moon.

Coleridge, The Rime of the Ancient Mariner, lines 111 – 114

The longer first and third lines are rarely rhymed, although at times poets may use internal rhyme in these lines.

In mist or cloud, on mast or shroud,
It perched for vespers nine;
Whiles all the night, through fog-smoke white,
While the creatures crooned

Coleridge, The Rime of the Ancient Mariner, lines 75 – 78
