= Yeoman =

Social class in late medieval/early modern England

The yeoman (/ˈjoʊmən/ YOH-mən) social class of medieval and early modern England ranked between the peasantry and the landed gentry. The class was first documented in mid-14th century England, where it included people who cultivated their own land as well as the middle ranks of servants in an English royal or noble household.

The 14th century witnessed the rise of the yeoman longbowmen during the Hundred Years' War, and the yeoman outlaws celebrated in the Robin Hood ballads. Yeomen joined the English Navy during the Hundred Years' War as seamen and archers. In the early 15th century, yeoman was the rank of chivalry between page and squire. By the late 17th century, yeoman became a rank in the Royal Navy for the common seamen who were in charge of ship's stores, such as foodstuffs, gunpowder, and sails.

References to the emerging social stratum of wealthy land-owning commoners began to appear after 1429. In that year, the Parliament of England re-organized the House of Commons into counties and boroughs, with voting rights granted to all freeholders. The Electors of Knights of the Shires Act 1429 restricted voting rights to those freeholders whose land value exceeded 40 shillings. These yeomen became a social stratum of commoners below the landed gentry, but above the husbandmen. This stratum later embodied the political and economic ideas of the English Enlightenment and Scottish Enlightenment, and transplanted those ideas to British North America during the early modern era.

Numerous yeoman farmers in North America served as citizen soldiers in the Continental Army during the American Revolutionary War. The 19th century saw a revival of interest in the medieval period with English Romantic literature. The yeoman outlaws of the ballads were refashioned into heroes fighting for justice under the law and the rights of freeborn Englishmen.

== Etymology ==
The etymology of yeoman is uncertain for several reasons.

The earliest documented use of the word occurs in Middle English. There are no known Old English words which are considered acceptable parent words for yeoman; nor are there any readily identifiable cognates of yeoman in Anglo-Norman, Old Frisian, Old Dutch, Old Saxon, or Middle Low German. The four last-named of these languages are West Germanic languages, closely related to Old English at the time they were spoken. Taken together, these facts would indicate that yeoman (1) is a word specific to the regional dialects found in England; and (2) is in no way similar to any word used in continental Europe.

Another complicating factor for the etymology is that yeoman is a compound word made by joining two other words: yeo + man. Linguists have been perplexed about the origin of yeo since scholars such as John Mitchell Kemble and Joseph Bosworth began the modern linguistic study of Old English in the early-to-mid-19th century. Two possible etymologies have been proposed to explain the origin of yeo.

=== Oxford English Dictionary ===
The Oxford English Dictionary (OED) has proposed that yeoman is derived from yongerman, which first appeared in a manuscript called Pseudo-Cnut's Constitutiones de Foresta. Although the manuscript has been demonstrated to be a forgery (it was produced during the reign of King Henry II of England, rather than during the reign of King Cnut), it is considered authentic to the 11th- and 12th-century forest laws. According to the OED, the manuscript refers to three social classes: (1) the thegn (noble) at the top; (2) the tunman (townman) at the bottom; and (3) the lesser thegn in the middle. Yongerman is considered a synonym for a lesser thegn. OED suggested that yongerman is related to youngman, meaning a male youth or young male adult who was in the service of a high-ranking individual or family.

This proposed etymology is that youngman is in turn related to Old Norse ungmenni (youths); North Frisian ongman (lad, fellow); Dutch jongeman (youngman); and German Jungmann (deckhand, ordinary seaman); cf. also German Junker ⇐ jung[er] Herr. This etymology provides a plausible semantic link from yongerman to youngman, while at the same time providing most of the earliest definitions of yeoman.

=== Chambers Dictionary of Etymology ===
The Chambers Dictionary of Etymology (CDE) is another well-respected scholarly source, as it is published by the same company which produces The Chambers Dictionary. The Chambers-proposed etymology reconstructs a possible Old English word, *ġēamann, as the parent of yeoman. (The asterisk or star as the first letter is a linguistic convention to indicate the word has been reconstructed, and is unattested in any surviving record). The reconstructed word is a compound word made from the root word ġē, ġēa (district, region) + mann (man). To further strengthen their etymology, CDE compares their reconstructed word to Old Frisian gāman (villager), and modern West Frisian gea, goa, Dutch gouw, German Gau (district, region).

== Medieval meanings ==
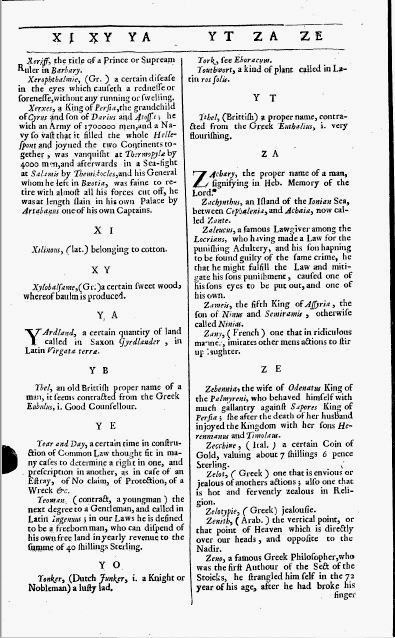
Page containing the entry for Yeoman in Phillips' 1658 edition of New World of English Words. This is probably the first appearance of a dictionary definition for Yeoman.

In the history of the English language, the earliest recorded usage of the word yeoman occurs in the Late Middle English period, and then becoming more widespread in the Early Modern English period. The transition from Middle English to Early Modern English was a gradual process occurring over decades. For the sake of assigning a historical date, OED defines the end of Middle English and the beginning of Early Modern English as occurring in 1500. The year 1500 marks the end of nearly 200 years of political and economic upheaval in England. The Hundred Years War, the recurring episodes of the Black Death, and over 32 years of civil war known as the War of the Roses all contributed to the end of the Middle Ages in England, and the beginning of the English Renaissance. It was during this time that English gradually replaced Norman French as the official language.

The first single-language dictionary of the English language, Robert Cawdrey's Table Alphabeticall, was published in 1604. The dictionary only included unusual English words, and loan words from foreign languages such as Hebrew, Greek, Latin, or French. Yeoman is not included in this dictionary. This suggests that in 1604, yeoman was a very commonly used English word. A more comprehensive, or general dictionary, was published in 1658. Edward Phillips' The New World of English Words contained basic definitions. Yeoman is included – probably for the first time in an English-language dictionary – but only a legal definition was given: (1) a social class immediately below a Gentleman; and (2) a freeborn man who can sell "his own free land in yearly revenue to the summe of 40 shillings Sterling". The fact that only the legal definition (introduced in the Electors of Knights of the Shires Act 1429) was given is another suggestion that yeoman was a common word at the time.

Between the 12th-century Pseudo-Cnut de Foresta and The New World of English Words in 1658, linguists have had to re-construct the meanings of yeoman from the surviving manuscripts. The various meanings of yeoman were apparently widely understood by the document author and his audience, and were not explained in the manuscripts. Linguists have deduced these specific historical meanings based on the context in which yeoman was used within the document itself. It is these meanings which are described in the following sections.

=== Household attendant or servant (14th century-present) ===
'Household servant' is one of the earliest documented uses of the word yeoman. During the 14th century, it referred to a servant or attendant in a royal or noble household, usually one who was of higher rank in the household hierarchy. This hierarchy reflected the feudal society in which they lived. Everyone who served a royal or noble household knew their duties, and knew their place. This was especially important when the household staff consisted of both nobles and commoners. There were actually two household hierarchies which existed in parallel. One was the organization based upon the function (duty) being performed. The other was based upon whether the person performing the duty was a noble or a commoner.

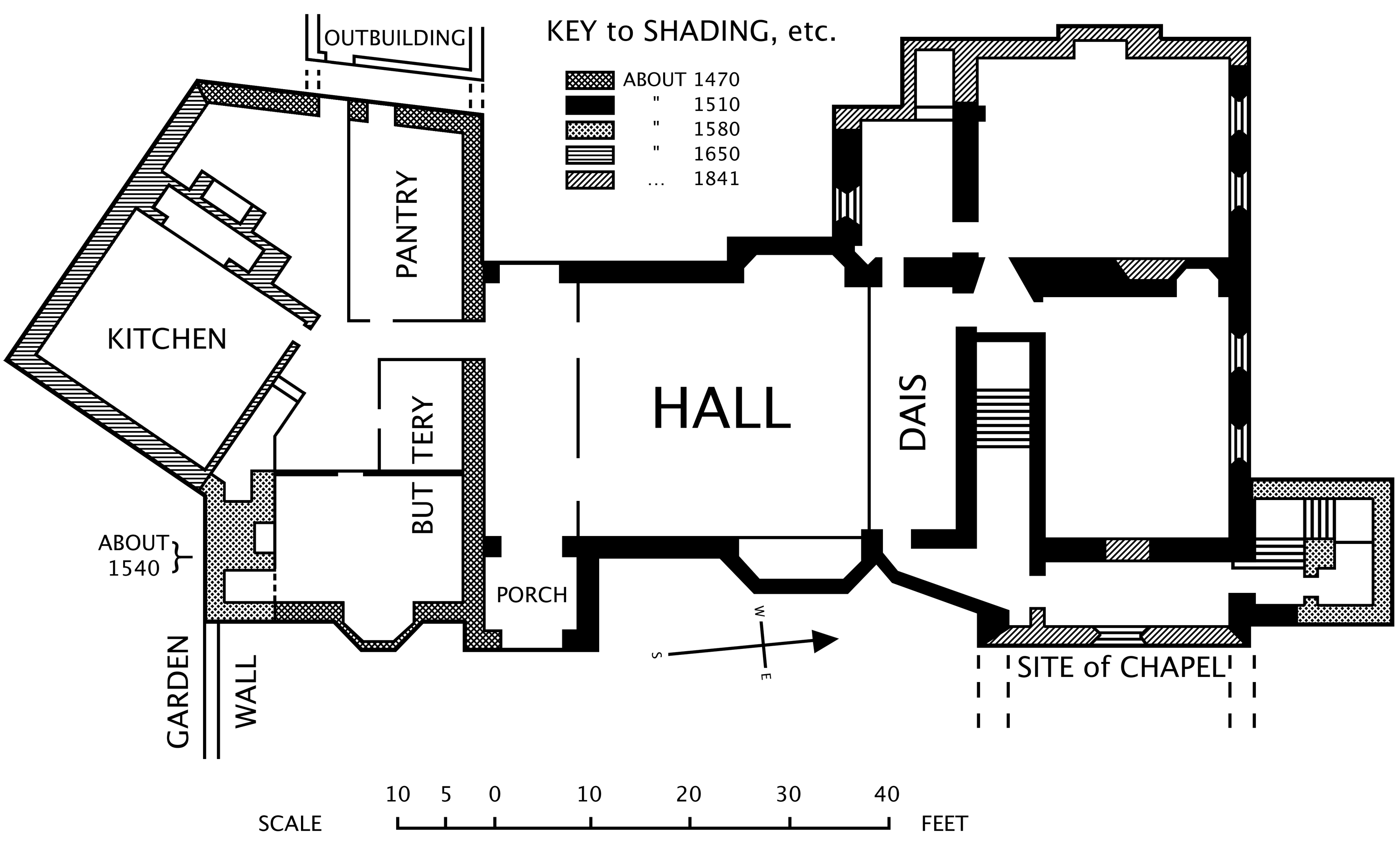
Floor plan of Horsham Hall (built early 16th century) showing the locations of the kitchen, buttery, and pantry relative to the Great hall

Similar household duties were grouped into Household Offices, which were then assigned to one of several Chief Officers. In each Household Office, the servants were organized into a hierarchy, arranged in ranks according to the level of responsibility.

Sergeant
The highest rank, which reported directly to the Chief Officer and oversaw an individual Household Office. The word was introduced to England by the Normans, and meant an attendant or servant.
Yeoman
The middle rank of the Household Office.
Groom
The lowest rank of the Household Office. It generally referred to a menial position for a free-born commoner.

The Chief Officers were nobles, but the servant ranks of Sergeant, Yeoman, and Groom could be filled by either commoners or members of noble families. Any household duties which required close contact with the lord's immediate family, or their rooms, were handled by nobles. For example, the Steward oversaw the Offices concerned with household management. Procurement, storage, and preparation of food, waiting at table, and tending to the kitchen gardens, were some of the duties for which the Steward was responsible. Under the Steward during the reign of King Edward III, there were two separate groups of yeomen: Yeomen of the King's Chamber and Yeomen of the Offices. The first group were members of noble families who waited only on the King, and the second group were commoners who performed similar duties for other household residents and guests in the Great Hall, kitchen, pantry, and other areas.

=== Yeoman service ===
Yeoman service (also yeoman's service) is an idiom which means "good, efficient, and useful service" in some cause. It has the connotations of the work performed by a faithful servant of the lower ranks, who does whatever it takes to get the job done.

The sense – although not the use – of the idiom can be found in the Gest of Robyn Hode, dated to about 1500. In the First Fitte (the first section of the ballad), Robin gives money to a poor knight to pay his debt to the abbot of St Mary's Abbey. Noticing that the knight was traveling alone, Robin offers him the service of Little John as a yeoman:

"I shall thee lend Little John, my man,
For he shall be thy knave;
In a yeoman's stead he may thee stand,
If thou great need have."

Here, Robin vouches for Little John as a yeoman, a faithful servant who will perform whatever duties are required in times of great need.

The phrase yeoman's service is used by William Shakespeare in Hamlet (published in 1601). In act V, scene 2, Prince Hamlet tells Horatio how he discovered the king's plot against himself in a commission (document). Hamlet then says he has substituted for the original a commission which he himself wrote:

"... I sat me down,
Devised a new commission, wrote it fair—
I once did hold it, as our statists do,
A baseness to write fair, and labored much
How to forget that learning; but, sir, now
It did me yeoman's service."

— Hamlet, V, 2

Hamlet remarks that he "wrote it fair", that is, in elegant, gentlemanly prose; a style of writing which he tried very hard to forget. But in composing the fake commission, Hamlet had to resort to "that learning". He tells Horatio that "it did me yeoman's service", that is, his learning stood him in good stead. Standing one in good stead is another idiom very similar in meaning to yeoman service. Note that it was used in the third line of Stanza of the Gest of Robyn Hode quoted in the paragraph above.

=== Attendant or assistant to an official (ca 14th–17th centuries) ===
Marshalsea Court was a court of the English royal household, presided over by the Steward and the Knight-Marshal. The court kept records from about 1276 until 1611. Unfortunately, only a few survive from the years 1316–59. Some information on the yeomen of the Marshalsea Court can be found in the Household Ordinance of King Edward IV from about 1483. The author of the Ordinance, looking back to the earlier household ordinances of King Edward III wrote: "Our sovereign lord's household is now discharged ... of the Court of Marshalsea, and all his clerks and yeomen." The writer was referring to the transfer of the Marshalsea Court from the royal household.

The Ordinance describe the duties of the Steward of the Household, who was also the Steward of the Court of Marshalsea. The Steward was assigned one chaplain, two squires, and four yeomen as his personal retinue. One yeoman was specifically attached to the Steward's rooms at the Court of Marshalsea "to keep his chamber and stuff". When the Steward was present in Court, he was entitled to a 10-person retinue. Besides the Steward and the Knight-Marshal, two other members of the royal household were empowered to preside: the Treasurer and the Controller. Of the Steward, Treasurer, and the Controller, at least one of them must preside in the Court every day.

=== A chivalric rank ===
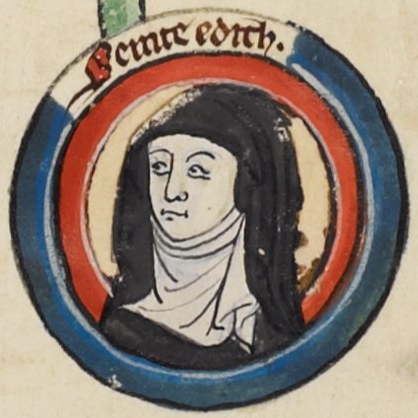
Edith of Wilton, from a 13th-century illuminated manuscript

One of the earliest documents which contains yeoman as a chivalric rank is the Chronicon Vilodunense (Life of Saint Edith). Originally written in Latin by Goscelin sometime in the 11th century, it was later translated into the Wiltshire dialect of Middle English about 1420. Part of the manuscript relates a story about the archbishop of York caught in a storm at sea while on a pilgrimage to Jerusalem. He prayed to Saint Edith for the storm to subside, and suddenly he saw Saint Edith standing beside him. The Blessed Virgin had sent her, she said, to assure the archbishop he would arrive home safe and sound. Miraculously, the storm stopped. The archbishop kept his vow, and visited St Edith's tomb at Wilton Abbey. There he preached a sermon about the miracle to each man there: knight, squire, yeoman, and page.

Although Wilton Abbey was a Benedictine nunnery, it held its lands from the king by knight service. The Abbess' knights were her tenants, who in turn held land from the Abbey by knight service. Usually the abbess fulfilled her duty to the king by scutage. But she had knights with King Henry III on his 1223 Welsh campaign, and at the Siege of Bedford Castle the following year. Between 1277 and 1327 she offered knight service at least four times.

About 50 years later in 1470, another reference to yeomen is made in the Warkworth Chronicle. The scene is King Edward IV's coronation, and the chronicler lists the nobles who received titles from His Majesty. At the end of the list he notes: "And other gentlemen and yeomen he made knights and squires, as they had deserved." (modern spelling) The chronicler makes no further mention of these men.

=== Yeomanry (14th–15th centuries) ===
An early historical meaning that seems to have disappeared before our modern era is "something pertaining to or characteristic of a yeoman", such as the speech or the dress. Perhaps the best way of illustrating this meaning is to quote briefly from one of the earliest Middle English ballads. Robin Hood and the Potter survives as a manuscript dated from about 1500. Robin demands a one penny toll of the Potter, for which the traveler could then proceed unharmed by the outlaw. The Potter refuses to pay. A scuffle ensues, in which the Potter overcomes Robin. The Potter then wants to know whom he has beaten. After hearing Robin's name, the Potter responds (modern translation from glossary notes):

"It is full little courtesy," said the potter.
"As I have heard wise men say,
If'n a poor yeoman come driving over the way,
To hold him on his journey."

"By my troth, thou says truth", said Robin.
"Thou says good yeomanry;
And though thou go forth every day,
Thou shalt not be held by me."

In the first stanza the Potter describes himself as a poor yeoman, whom people say Robin Hood would never stop or waylay (also known as a holdup). It is obvious from the story that the Potter was not dressed in a yeomanly manner, otherwise Robin would have never accosted him. It was not until Robin heard the Potter speak that he recognizes him as a yeoman. Whether he was referring to his direct straightforward manner, or his dialect, or both, is unclear to a 21st-century reader. But it is apparent that the original 15th century audiences knew exactly what good yeomanry was.

=== Yeoman archer (14th–15th centuries) ===
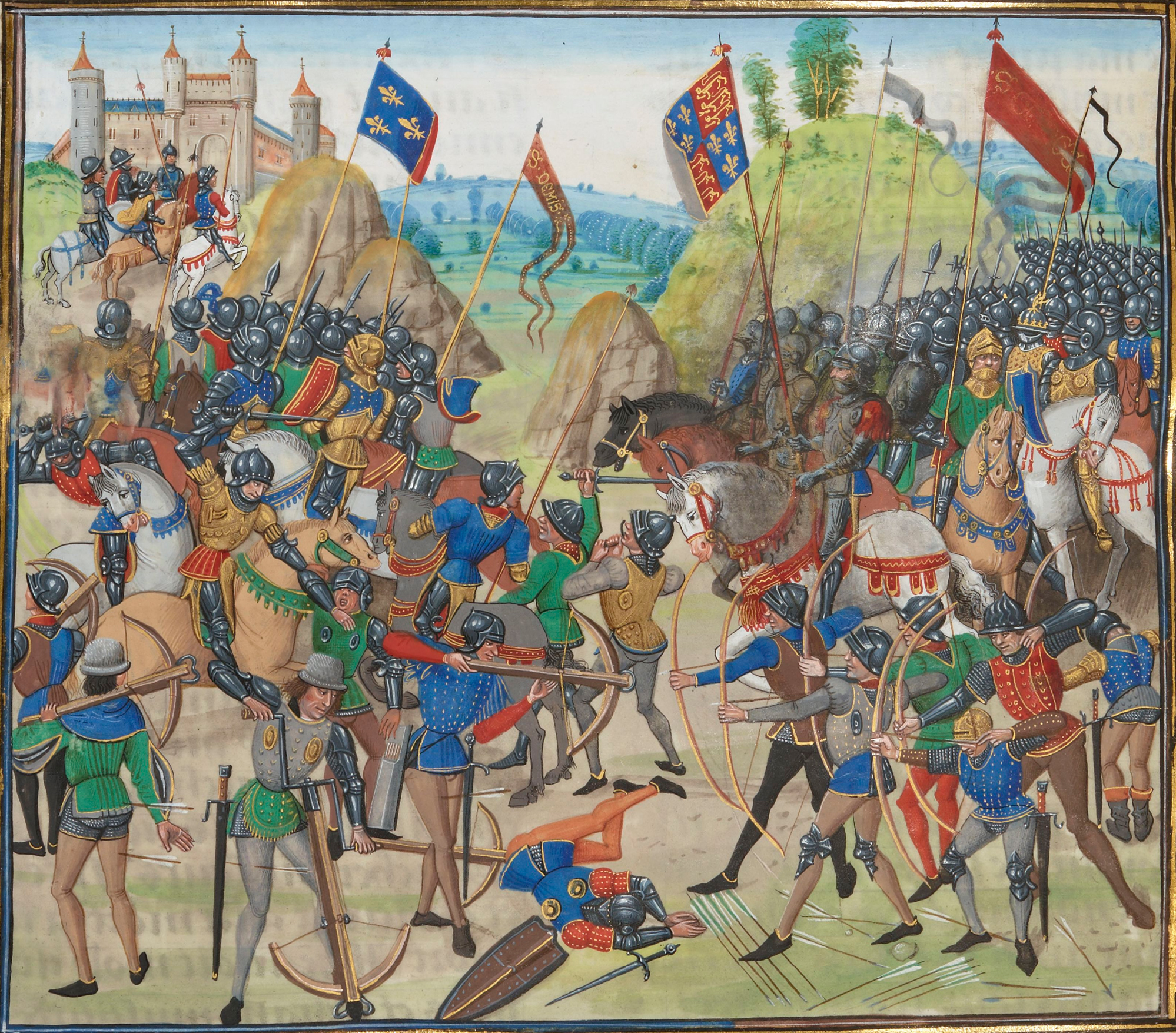
Battle of Crécy, as depicted in a 15th-century illuminated manuscript of Jean Froissart's Chronicles. Both armies are shown stylistically; archers in the foreground. English archers are shown with the legendary longbow, while the Italian mercenaries struggle with their crossbows.

Yeoman archer is a term applied specifically to English and Welsh military longbow archers (either mounted or on foot) of the 14th–15th centuries. Yeoman archers were commoners; free-born members of the social classes below the nobility and gentry. They were a product of the English form of feudalism in which the military duty of a knight to his lord (which was implicit in tenure feudalism) was replaced by paid, short-term service.

The yeoman archers were the English army's response to a chronic manpower problem when trying to field an army on the European continent during the 14th century. Against 27,000 French knights, England could only muster at most 5,000 men-at-arms. With this 5:1 tactical disadvantage, the English needed a strategic advantage.

When Edward I invaded Wales in 1282, he quickly realized the battlefield importance of the opposing Welsh archers. Firing from ambush, they inflicted serious casualties on Edward's army. When Edward invaded Scotland for the second time in 1298, his army consisted mostly of infantry (12,500 of 15,000 men). His infantry included about 10,500–10,900 Welshmen. 2,000 men, including archers, were raised as part of the Lancashire and Cheshire levies under the Commission of Array. At the Battle of Falkirk, the English army archers opened up the Scottish schiltrons with hails of arrows. The Scottish infantrymen fled the battlefield, to be pursued and killed by the English cavalry. In 1333, his grandson, Edward III, undertook his first invasion of Scotland, which culminated with the Battle of Halidon Hill. Halidon Hill is where the 20-year old Edward III learned how to combine archers and dismounted men-at-arms – tactics that he would employ during his Crécy campaign in France. The English victory at the Battle of Crécy was followed by another victory at the Battle of Poitiers, and a final victory at the Siege of Calais. After the Battle of Agincourt, the Yeoman Archer had become as legendary as his bow. By negating the tactical advantage of large numbers of cavalry (mounted knights and men-at-arms) with their ability to rapidly fire volleys of arrows, yeoman archers are considered part of the Infantry revolution of the 14th century. They could be deployed as "Archers on horse" (mounted archers who could reach the scene quickly, dismount, & set up a firing line) or as "Archers on foot" (foot archers who followed as reinforcements).

=== Yeoman of the Guard (15th century-present) ===
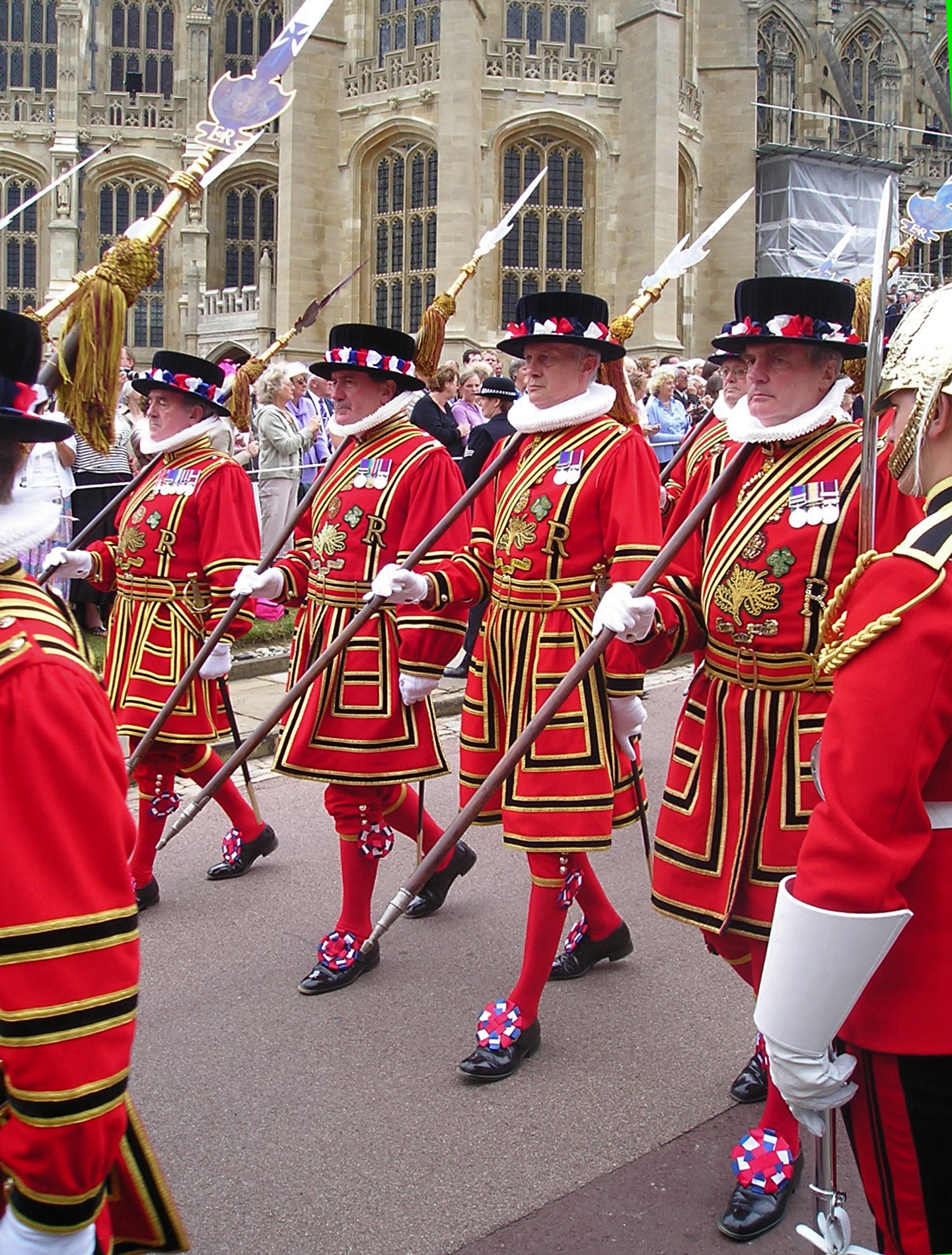
Yeomen of the Guard in procession. Their uniform has remained relatively unchanged since the Tudor dynasty. The spears are carried in remembrance of their role in protecting Henry Tudor at Bosworth Field.

On 22 August 1485, near the small village of Stoke Golding, Henry Tudor met King Richard III in battle for the Crown of England. The War of the Roses had persisted intermittently for more than 30 years between the rival claimants of the House of York (white rose) and the House of Lancaster (red rose). In 1483, Richard, of the House of York, had deposed his young nephew, 12-year old Edward V. Henry Tudor, of the House of Lancaster, was the favored candidate to replace Richard.

Three armies met that day on Bosworth Field: Richard, with his supporters, Duke of Norfolk and the Earl of Northumberland; Henry, with his troops under command of the veteran John de Vere, Earl of Oxford; and the troops of Thomas, Lord Stanley. Stanley was a powerful lord in northwest England. But he was stepfather of Henry Tudor, and Richard was holding his son hostage. Stanley's forces remained uncommitted as the battle raged. As Oxford advanced, the troops appeared to leave Henry, his bodyguards, and some French mercenaries isolated. Or so it appeared to Richard. Sensing an opportunity, Richard charged toward Henry. Seeing this, Stanley made his decision, and charged to reinforce Henry. Henry's bodyguards fought bravely to hold off Richard's bodyguards until the arrival of Stanley's troops. During the melee, Richard's horse became mired in the marsh, and he was killed. Henry had won.

Henry rewarded his bodyguards by formal establishing the Yeomen of the Guard of (the body of) our Lord the King. The King of England always had bodyguards (Yeoman of the Crown). This royal act recognized their bravery and loyalty in doing their duty, and designated them as the first members of a bodyguard to protect the King (or Queen) of England forever. In their first official act on 1 October 1485, fifty members of the Yeoman of the Guard, led by John de Vere, 13th Earl of Oxford, formally escorted Henry Tudor to his coronation ceremony.

=== Yeoman Warder (16th century-present) ===
The Tower of London was used as permanent royal residence until 1509–10, during the reign of King Henry VIII. Henry ordered 12 Yeoman of the Guard to remain as a garrison, indicating that the Tower was still a royal palace. When the Tower no longer served that function, the garrison became warders, and were not permitted to wear the Yeoman of the Guard uniform. During the reign of Henry's son, Edward VI, the warders were given back the uniform. This was done as a result of petition from the former Lord Protector of the Realm, Edward Seymour, 1st Duke of Somerset. Seymour, who was Edward's uncle, had been confined there, and found the warders to be most considerate.

=== English Navy yeoman (to 1485) ===
The earliest documented use of yeoman relative to a navy is found in the Merchant's Tale of Beryn: "Why gone the yeomen to boat – Anchors to haul?" The context of the quotation sheds no further light on either yeomen or boats. What is important is the date of the manuscript: between 1450 and 1470. This places the Merchant's Tale of Beryn about the same time as the Robin Hood and the Monk manuscript, and shortly before the end of the Hundred Years War. To understand the connections between yeoman and the early English navy, it is necessary to examine King Edward III's reign and the beginning of the Hundred Years War.

England did not have a standing navy until the Tudor Navy of King Henry VIII. Before then, the "King's Ships" were a very small fleet allocated for the King's personal use. During the Hundred Years War, King Edward III actually owned only a few ships. The rest were made available to the King through agreements with his nobles and the various port towns of England. About 25 ships of various sizes were made available to Edward III every year. They ranged from the small Thames sailing barges (descended from the famous Norman longships of the Bayeux Tapestry) which shuttled the royal retinue up and down the River Thames, to large cogs. Cogs were large merchant ships, with high prows and sterns, and a single mast with a single square sail. The largest cogs were built to carry sizable wine casks. The Vintners' Company, in return for their monopoly on the wine trade, had to make their cogs available to the King on demand.

The 1345 Household Ordinance of Edward III provides a brief summary of the Fleets organized for the Crécy campaign. The South Fleet (which included all English ports south and west of River Thames) consisted of 493 ships with 9,630 mariners. Of these, the King's Ships (25 ships with 419 mariners), the ports of Dartmouth (31 ships with 757 mariners), Plymouth (26 ships with 603 mariners), and London (25 ships with 602 mariners) were the largest contingents. The North Fleet (which included all English ports north of River Thames) consisted of 217 ships with 4521 mariners. The port of Yarmouth, with 43 ships with 1095 mariners, was the largest contingent. The definition of a mariner is unclear, as is the difference between a mariner and a sailor. The number of mariners given is about twice that needed to man a ship. Edward's warships carried two crews. The second crew was used for night sailing, for providing a crew for prize ships, and for providing more fighting men.

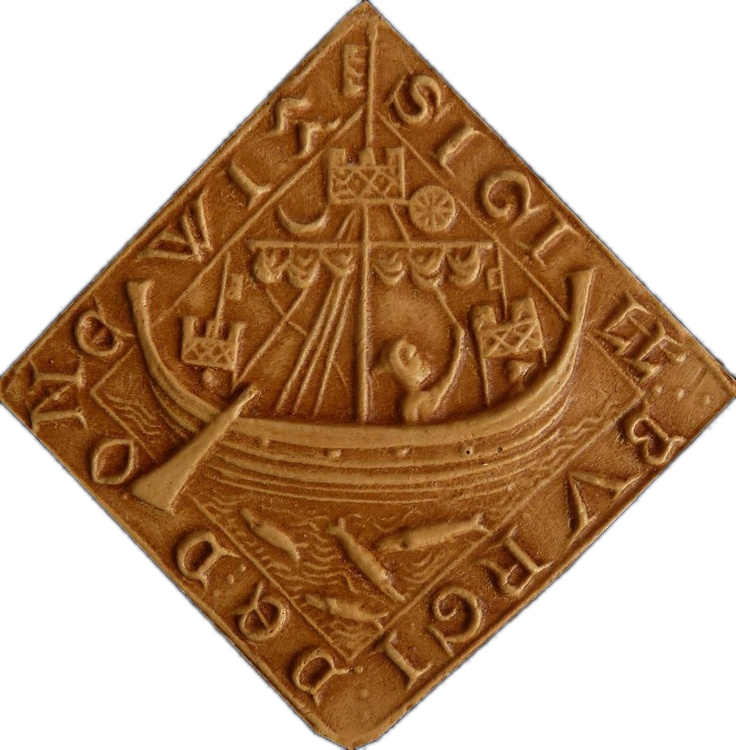
Seal of the port of Dunwich. This is an earlier ship (note the side rudder) which has been retro-fitted with a forecastle, aftcastle, and topcastle. The forecastle and aftcastle platforms are tall enough so men can stand underneath them.

Early in the Hundred Years War, the largest existing merchant ships, such as the cog, were converted to warships with the addition of wooden castles. There were three types of castles: forecastle (at the prow), aftcastle (at the stern), and the topcastle (at the top of the mast). A record from 1335 tells of the vessel Trinity (200 tons) being converted for war. As new ships were built, the castles became integral with the ship's hull.

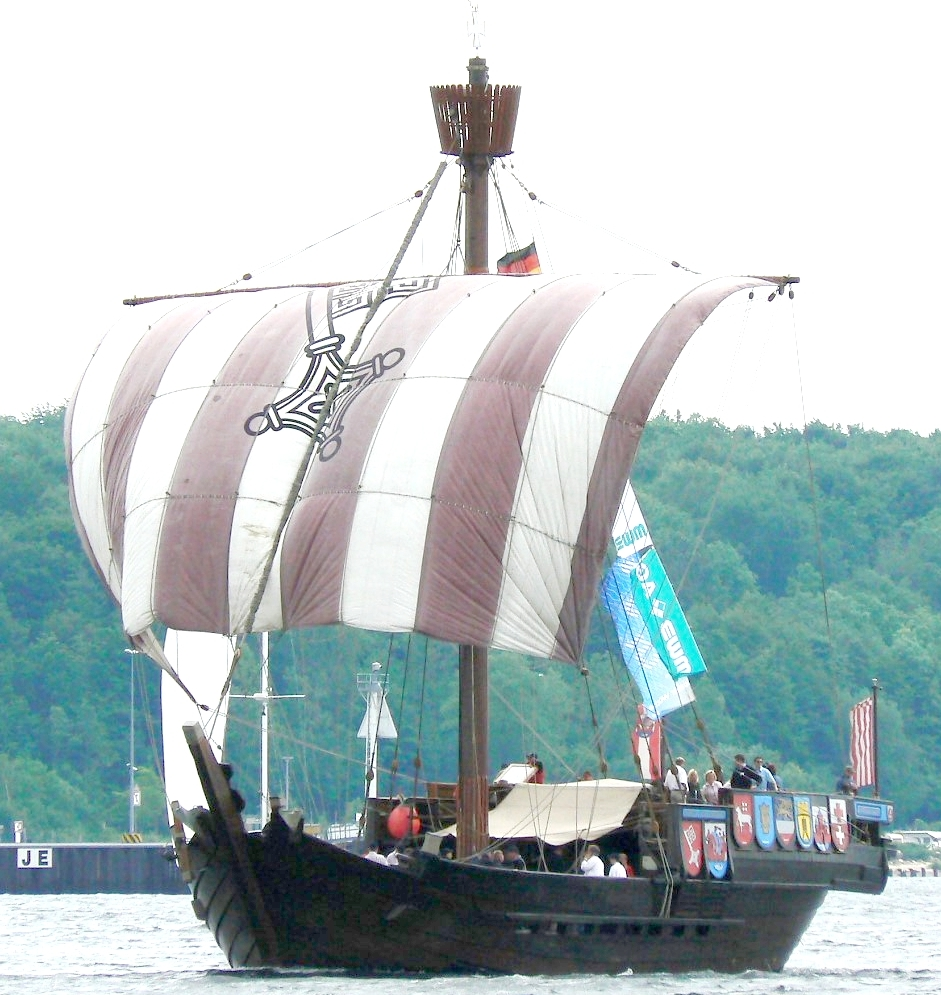
The reconstruction ship Ubena von Bremen. Note that the aftcastle is part of the ship's hull.

As the King was impressing all the big ships and their crews for the war effort, the mayors and merchants of the port towns were retrofitting old ships and building new ones for harbor defense, and patrols to protect coastal ships and fishing boats from enemy ships and pirates.

By this time (mid-14th century), the Captain of the ship was a separate military rank. He was responsible for the defense of the ship. For every 4 mariners aboard the warship, there was 1 man-at-arms and 1 archer who was stationed in the castles. For a vessel the size of the Trinity, which carried about 130 mariners, there were at least 32 men-at-arms and 32 archers.

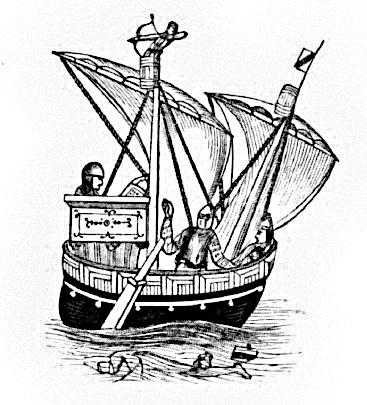
14th century Northern Europe warship

These illuminations from a 14th-century manuscript provide some insight as to how the retrofitted castles were used in battle. The first illustration shows a 2-masted vessel, with a man-at-arms in the retrofitted aftcastle, and an archer in the retrofitted topcastle.

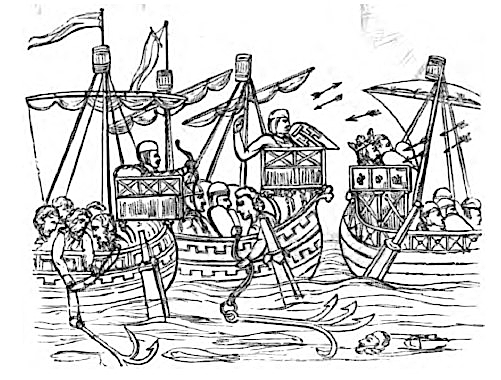
14th century Northern European warship battle scene

The next illustration shows a battle scene. The tactics included using grappling hooks to position the ships so that the archers on the aftcastles had clear shots into the opposing ship. After raking the deck with arrows, the men-at-arms would swing over to finish the job.

The warship Captain was also responsible for convoying 30 merchant vessels from English ports to the French shore. These vessels carried the troops, horses, food, forage, and whatever else was needed upon landing in France.

The Master (or Master Mariner) was responsible for sailing the vessel. Under him were the Constables (equivalent to today's boatswains). One constable oversaw twenty crewmen. Collecting a crew was traditionally the task of the Master. However, with the need for double-crews, the King authorized his Admirals to offer the King's pardon to outlaws and pirates. In 1342, the number of men who responded exceeded the demand. Edward's deputies never had trouble again raising the crews they needed. This is reminiscent of the pardons offered by Edward to outlaws of the Robin Hood ballads. Therefore, it is possible that the real answer to "Why gone the yeomen to boat – Anchors to haul?" was a pardon.

Instances of yeoman in a naval context are rare before 1700. In 1509, the Office of Ordnance had a Master, Clerk, and Yeoman. In 1608, a House of Lords manuscript mentions a ship's gunner and a yeoman. Then in 1669 appeared The Mariner's Magazine, dedicated to the Society of Merchant-Adventurers of the City of Bristol. Among the various chapters on the use of mathematics in sea navigation and gunnery, the author suggests "He [the Gunner] must be careful in making Choice of a sober honest Man, for the Yeoman of the Powder."(modern spelling) In 1702, actual titles of seamen appear in the London Gazette: Yeomen of the Sheets, and Yeomen of the Powder Room.

=== Social stratum of small freeholders ===
This review of the yeoman freeholders is divided into three periods: (a) up to 1500; (b) between 1500 and 1600; and (c) between 1600 and 1800. This division corresponds roughly to the historical changes experienced by the freeholders themselves, as well as the shifting contemporary social hierarchies in which they lived. It is also influenced by the availability of sources for each period.

==== Up to 1500 ====
The parliament of 1327 was a watershed event. For the first time since the Norman Conquest, an English king was deposed peaceably, and not usurped by military means. Although Edward II had been previously threatened with deposition in 1310 and 1321, all those who attended the parliament of 1327 were aware of the constitutional crisis. The king was imprisoned by his Queen Isabella and her paramour Roger Mortimer after their invasion of England. The Parliament was a legal pretense to confer legitimacy upon their actions. The Lords Temporal and the Lords Spiritual were summoned in the King's name, while the Knights of the Shire, Burgesses from the towns, and representatives from the Cinque Ports were elected to attend. According to Michael Prestwich: "What was necessary was to ensure that every conceivable means of removing the King was adopted, and the procedures combined all possible precedents". Hence, establishing the legitimacy of Edward III was paramount. But it was the Knights of the Shire and Burgesses (hereafter referred to as the commons) who drove the proceedings, both before and after Edward III's coronation. Beginning in 1327, the commons became a permanent part of parliament.

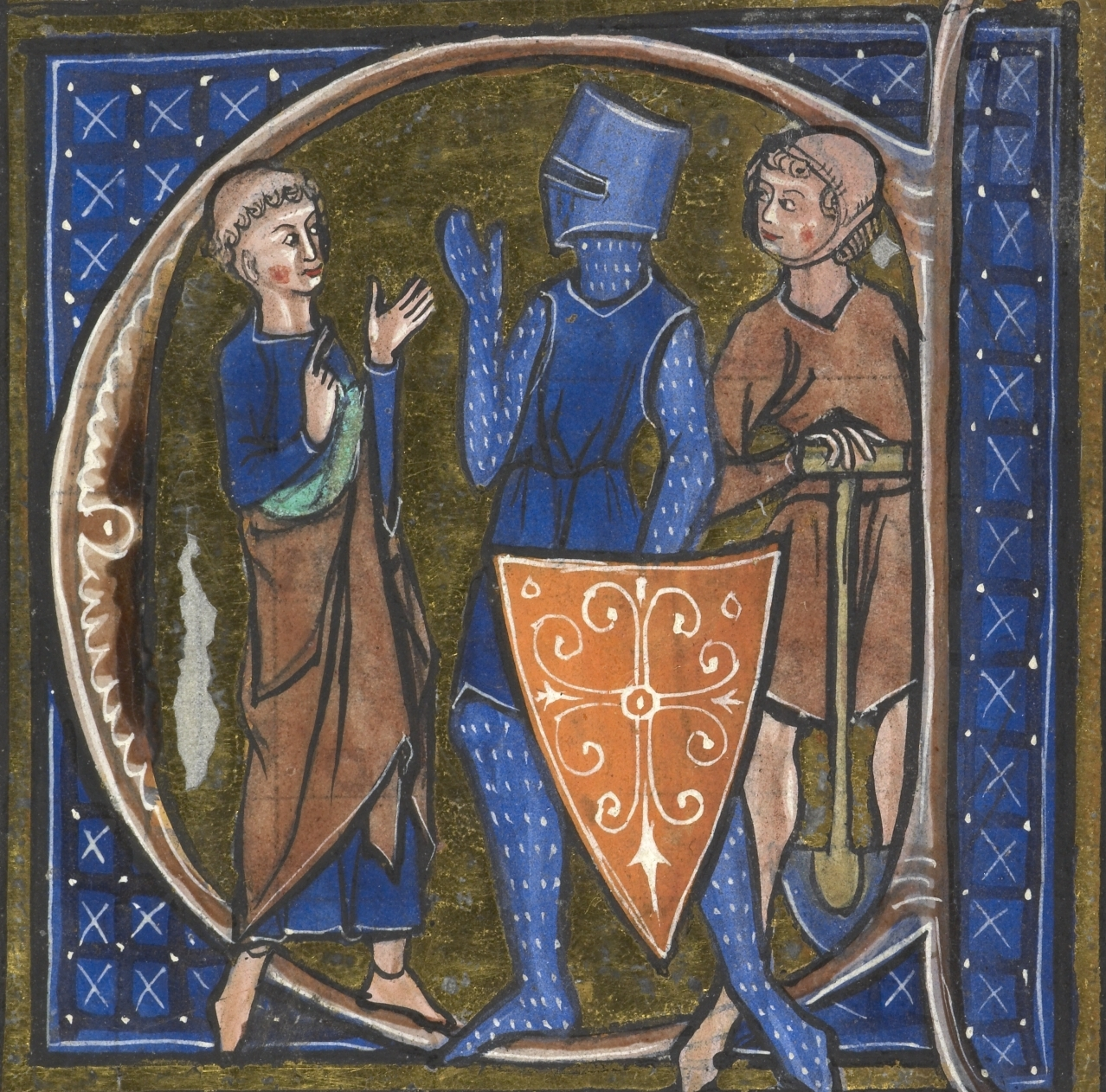
13th-century French depiction of the Three Estates: (1) those who pray (shown as a cleric); (2) those who fight (shown as a knight); and (3) those who work (shown as a peasant).

In the 14th century, the name commons did not have its modern meaning of common people. It referred to the communities, which was les Communs in Anglo-Norman French. The word meant that those elected to the parliament were representatives of their communities, that is, the shires and the urban areas. To distinguish between this early assembly from the later House of Commons, the commons is used herein.

The commons included the proctors of the lesser clergy as members of the sessions. In 1333, the commons sat together in a single chamber for the first time. About this same time, the commons was evolving into its role of legislating taxation. The king preferred to include taxes on clerical income with the direct taxes on the laity. The church hierarchy (archbishops and bishops) considered that no secular authority had the right to enforce tax collection from clerical income in a secular court. Such cases, they thought, should be considered in an of law. In 1340, the bishops negotiated a settlement with the Crown, wherein disputes between the king and clergy over taxation would be heard in ecclesiastical courts at either Canterbury or York. Therefore, there was no longer a need for the proctors to attend the commons. This was an important milestone for the commons. It became a secular assembly, its deliberations unaffected by ecclesiastical concerns. In 1342, the commons reorganized itself as the House of Commons, deliberating separately from the king, nobles and higher clergy of noble status. Each county had two Knights of the Shire as representatives, except for Durham and Cheshire, which were county palatines.

Initially, the Knights of the Shire were selected from among the belted knights.

Sir Anthony Richard Wagner, Garter Principal King of Arms, wrote that "a Yeoman would not normally have less than 100 acres" (40 hectares) "and in social status is one step down from the Landed gentry, but above, say, a husbandman". Often it was hard to distinguish minor landed gentry from the wealthier yeomen, and wealthier husbandmen from the poorer yeomen.

==== 1500–1600 ====
As some yeomen overlapped into the newly emerging gentry through wealth and marriage; others merged with the merchants and professions of the towns through education; some became local officials in the counties; and still others maintained their original identity as farmers.

Yeomen were often constables of their parish, and sometimes chief constables of the district, shire or hundred. Many yeomen held the positions of bailiffs for the High Sheriff or for the shire or hundred. Other civic duties would include churchwarden, bridge warden, and other warden duties. It was also common for a yeoman to be an overseer for his parish. Yeomen, whether working for a lord, king, shire, knight, district or parish, served in localised or municipal police forces raised by or led by the landed gentry. Some of these roles, in particular those of constable and bailiff, were carried down through families. Yeomen often filled ranging, roaming, surveying, and policing roles. In districts remoter from landed gentry and burgesses, yeomen held more official power: this is attested in statutes of the reign of Henry VIII (reigned 1509–1547), indicating yeomen along with knights and squires as leaders for certain purposes.

=== Yeoman farmer ===
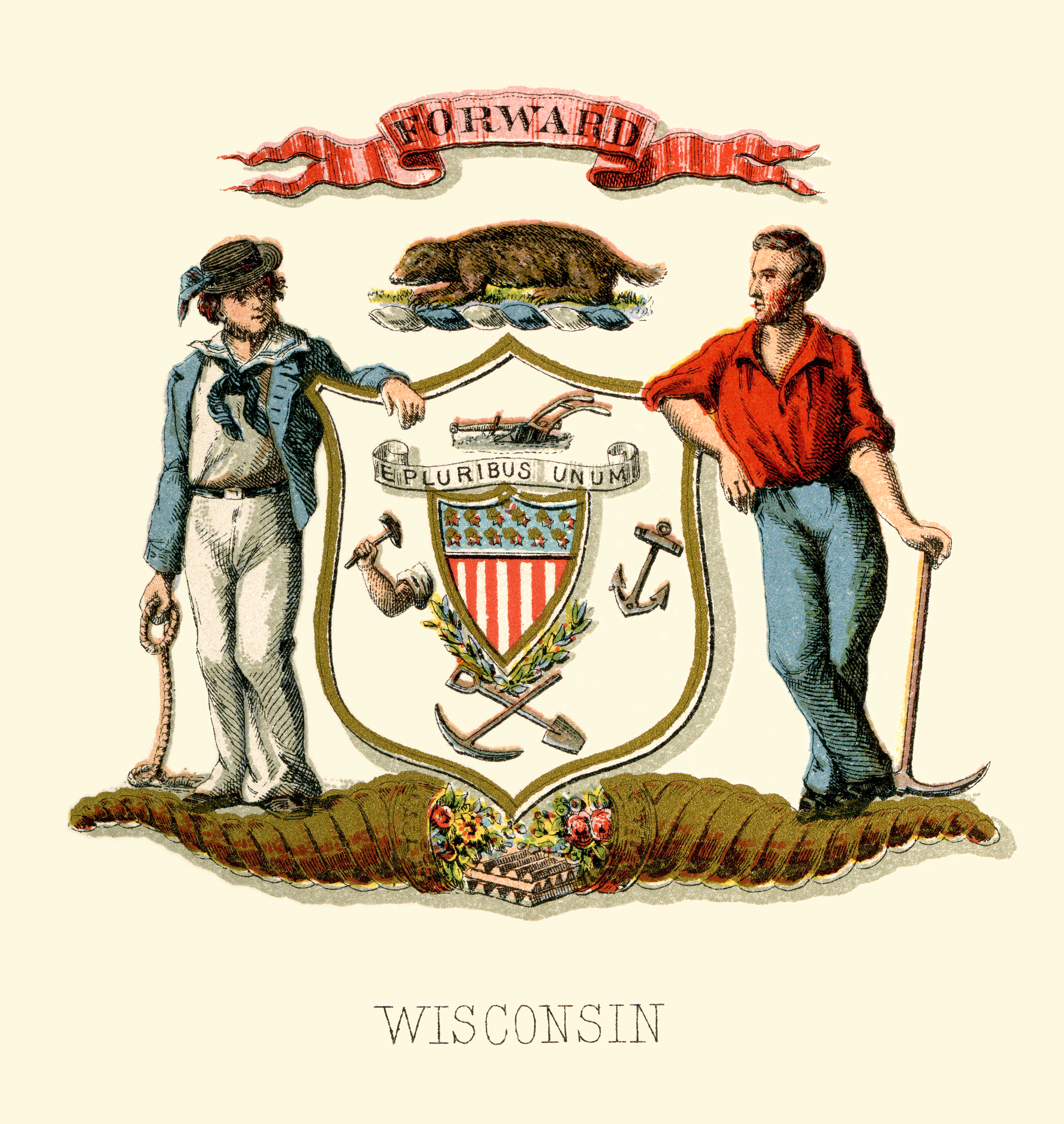
Coat of arms of Wisconsin during the Civil War, with yeoman on the right

In the United States, yeomen were identified in the 18th and 19th centuries as non-slaveholding, small landowning, family farmers. In areas of the Southern United States where land was poor, like East Tennessee, the landowning yeomen were typically subsistence farmers, but some managed to grow crops for market. Whether they engaged in subsistence or commercial agriculture, they controlled far more modest landholdings than those of the planters, typically in the range of 50–200 acres. In the Northern United States, practically all the farms were operated by yeoman farmers as family farms.

Thomas Jefferson was a leading advocate of the yeomen, arguing that the independent farmers formed the basis of republican values. Indeed, Jeffersonian Democracy as a political force was largely built around the yeomen. After the American Civil War (1861–1865), organizations of farmers, especially the Grange, formed to organize and enhance the status of the yeoman farmers.

== Modern meanings ==
=== The Yeomanry ===
During the 1790s, the threat of French invasion of Great Britain appeared genuine. In 1794, The British Volunteer Corps was organized for home defense, composed of local companies of part-time volunteers. Their cavalry troops became known as the Yeomanry Cavalry. The infantry companies were disbanded by 1813, as the threat of Napoleon Bonaparte's invasion evaporated. However, the Yeomanry Cavalry was retained. They were used to quell the food riots of 1794–95 and break up workers' strikes during the 1820s–1840s, as part of their mandate was to maintain the King's Peace. The rise of civilian police forces during this same period (the Metropolitan Police Act 1829, the Municipal Corporations Act 1835, and the County Police Act 1839) replaced the Yeomanry Cavalry as an instrument of law enforcement. In 1899, the Yeomanry Cavalry were deployed overseas during the Second Boer War, after a series of devastating British Army defeats. In 1901, the Yeomanry Cavalry formed the nucleus of the new Imperial Yeomanry. Eight years later, the Imperial Yeomanry and the Volunteer Force were combined as the Territorial Force.

=== United States Navy ===
In the modern Navy, a yeoman is an enlisted service member who performs administrative and clerical work.

The Continental Navy was established by the Continental Congress in 1775. The legislation called for officers, warrant officers, and enlisted men. The roster of enlisted men was left open to each ship captain to fill as he deemed necessary. After the Treaty of Paris, the Navy was considered unnecessary by Congress, and it was disbanded in 1785. The surviving ships were sold off.

The US Constitution (Article I, Section 8, Clause 14) granted the new US Congress the power to build and maintain a navy. It wasn't until 1794, when the worsening US relations with Great Britain and France, as well as the continuing attacks by Barbary pirates, forced Congress to appropriate funds to construct 6 frigates. The US naval hierarchy established followed the precedent set by the British Royal Navy. To which the US Navy added Petty Officers, which included the jobs traditionally assigned to naval yeomen. The first US Navy yeomen were Yeoman of the Gunroom and the Captain's Clerk. Petty officers were appointed by the ship's captain, and served at his pleasure. They did not retain their rank when they moved to another ship.

As the US Navy transformed from sail to steam, and from wood to steel, the yeoman's duties gradually changed to more administrative tasks. The Gunner's Yeoman was eliminated in 1838, the Boatswain's Yeoman in 1864, the Engineer's Yeoman and the Equipment Yeoman in 1893. The Captain's Clerk of 1798 became a Yeoman in 1893, which makes today's Yeoman a descendant of one of the original rates and ratings in the US Navy.

== Yeomen in Late Middle/Early Modern English literature ==
Until the 16th century, yeomen were mentioned either as servants in Norman French-speaking aristocratic households, or as members of the English army or navy in the Anglo-Norman kings' military expeditions across the English Channel. It was not until Middle English became England's official language during the 14th century and the new social stratum of yeoman freeholders gained respectability during the 15th century, that the oral ballads repeated by previous generations of English-speaking yeomen were written down and distributed to a wider audience.

The best-known ballads were about the yeoman outlaw Robyn Hode (Robin Hood, in modern spelling). A J Pollard, in his book Imagining Robin Hood: The Late Medieval Stories in Historical Context, proposed that the first Robin Hood was a literary fiction of the 15th and early 16th centuries. This does not mean that Pollard claims that Robin Hood was not historical. He considers that what modern popular culture thinks it knows about Robin is actually based upon how previous generations over the last 500 years have viewed him. The historical Robyn Hode was (or were, in the case of there possibly being several men whose exploits were melded into the single individual of the ballads) of secondary importance to his cultural symbolism for succeeding generations. In his review of Pollard's book, Thomas Ohlgren, one of the editors of the University of Rochester's The Robin Hood Project, agreed with this assessment. Because A Gest of Robyn Hode is a 16th-century collective memory of a fictional past, it can also be seen as a reflection of the century in which it was written. Following in the footsteps of Pollard and Ohlgren, this section examines some of the literature written in Late Middle English and Early Modern English to explore how the historical Yeoman was slowly transformed by succeeding generations into a legend for their own times.

=== A Gest of Robyn Hode ===
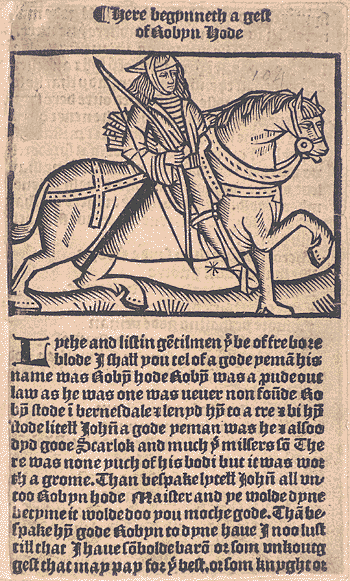
First page of the Antwerp edition of A Gest of Robyn Hode

Rhymes (ballads) of Robin Hood were being sung as early as the 1370s. William Langland, the author of Piers Plowman, has Sloth say that he does not know his Pater Noster (Latin for the Our Father prayer) as perfectly as the priest sings it, but he does know the rhymes of Robin Hood. Unfortunately, the rhymes that William Langland heard have not survived. The earliest surviving ballads are Robin Hood and the Monk (dated to 1450), Robin Hood and the Potter (dated to about 1500), and A Gest of Robyn Hode. The oldest copies of A Gest of Robyn Hode are print editions dated between 1510 and 1530. These early rhymes are witnesses to a crucial time in English history. The 14th–15th centuries saw the rise of the common people's Middle English over the decline of the aristocrats' Norman French, the military prowess of the yeoman longbowmen during the Hundred Years War (see Yeoman archers), and the beginnings of a yeoman class (see Social Class of Small Freeholders).In the Gest, Robin is an outlaw (meaning "outside the law"); someone who was summoned to a law court, but failed to appear. He has gathered around himself a fellowship of "sevenscore men", that is, 140 skilled bowmen. Nevertheless, Robin is the King's Man: "I love no man in all the world/So well as I do my king;". Disguised as a monk carrying the King's Seal, King Edward finally meets Robin, and is invited to a feast. During the archery contest afterwards, Robin suddenly recognizes Edward. He immediately kneels to offer homage, asking for mercy for his men. Edward grants pardon, and invites Robin to court. Robin agrees, and offers his men as a retinue. Note how Robin's behavior fits a commander of men. This entire scene is reminiscent of the contracted indenture offered by Edward III, where pardons were granted for war service (see Yeoman archers). It is interesting that this historical detail had been preserved in the Gest of Robyn Hode.

Harken, good yeomen,
Comely, courteous, and good,
One of the best that ever bore bow,
His name was Robin Hood.
Robin Hood was the yeoman's name,
That was both courteous and generous;
For the love of Our Lady,
All women honored him.

— Robin Hood and the Potter, lines 5–12

These earliest ballads contain clues to the changes in the English social structure which elevated the yeoman to a more powerful and influential level (see A Chivalric Rank). In the box to the left is the opening of Robin Hood and the Potter. (Note that all quotations have modern spelling, and obsolete words have been substituted.) The audience is addressed as "good yeomen", and yeoman Robin is described as possessing the "knightly virtues" of courtesy (good manners), goodness, generosity, and a devotion to the Virgin Mary. Thomas Ohlgren, a Robin Hood scholar, considers this to be an indication of the social changes the yeomen were undergoing. The yeomen may be lower in social rank to the knight, but they see themselves as possessing the traits of the knightly class.

Lithe and listen, gentlemen,
That be of freeborn blood;
I shall you tell of a good yeoman,
His name was Robin Hood.

— Gest of Robyn Hode, lines 1–4

In the box to the right, the opening lines of Gest of Robyn Hode offer confirmation that yeomen now consider themselves as part of the gentry. The audience is now composed of "gentlemen". Stephen Knight and Thomas Ohlgren suggest that the "Gest" audience was a literate audience interested in political resistance. This interpretation appears to be supported by the rise of the new social class of yeoman (see Social Class of Small Freeholders).

=== Chaucer's Canterbury Tales ===
Geoffrey Chaucer's The Canterbury Tales include several characters described as yeoman, shedding light on the nature of the yeoman in the late 14th century when the work was written.

==== General Prologue: The Yeoman ====
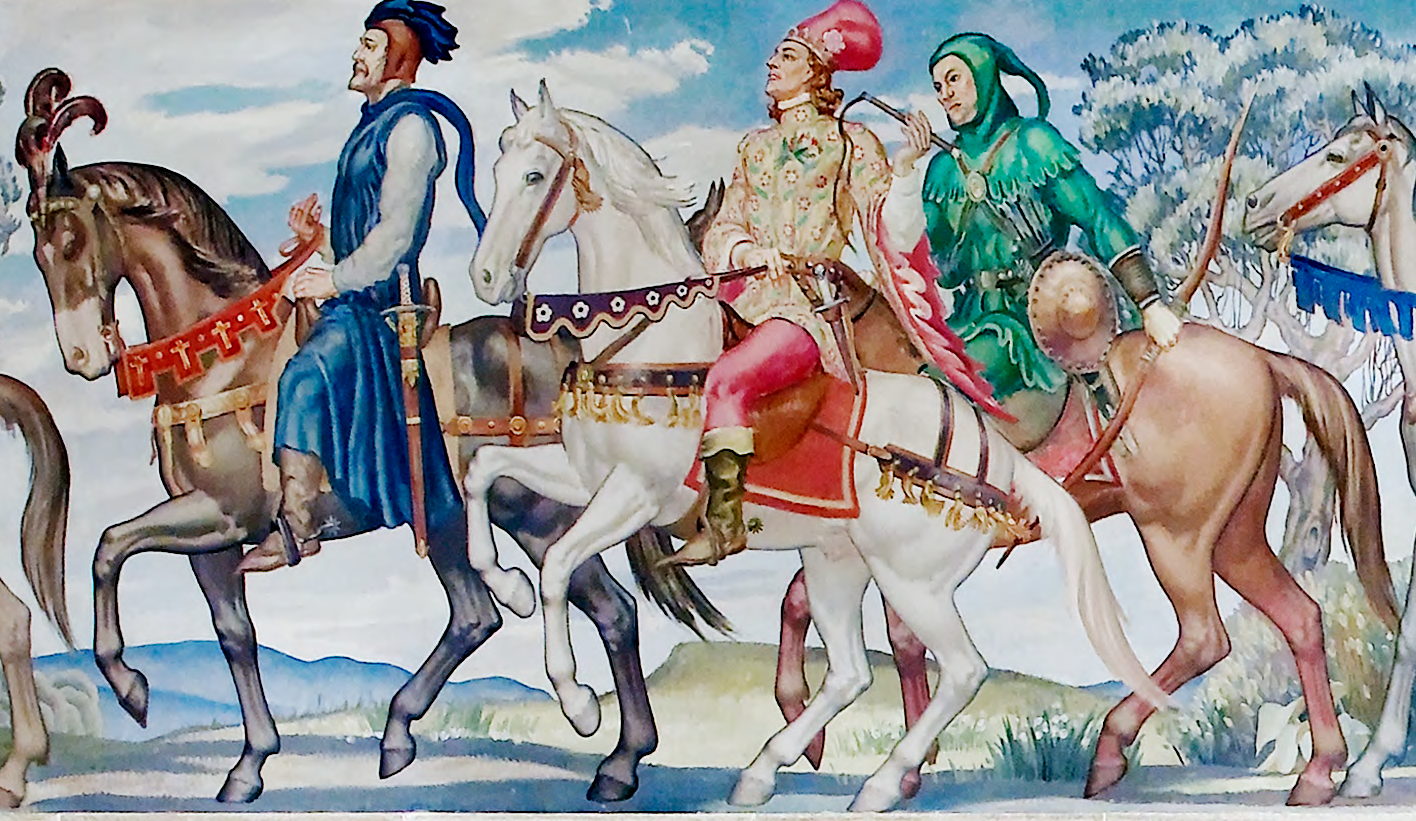
Knight Retinue detail from the wall mural depicting The Canterbury Tales in the Library of Congress North Reading Room in the John Adams Building. Note the green attire of The Yeoman, and his bow, quiver, buckler, and dagger.

In the General Prologue, Chaucer describes The Yeoman as being the only servant The Knight wanted on the pilgrimage. From the way he was dressed, Chaucer supposes he is a forester. The man is wearing a green tunic and hood. His hair is closely cropped, his face is tanned and weather-beaten, and his horn is slung from a green baldric. The Yeoman is well-armed. He carries a "mighty bow" in his hand with a sheaf of arrows hung from his belt. Chaucer points out that the peacock feather fletching was well-made. The archer obviously took great care when making his arrows. He also carries a sword, a buckler, and a small dagger. (Note the similarity between this yeoman's accoutrements and those of the Yeomen of the King's Crown.) The forester's final protection is a medal of Saint Christopher, the patron saint of travelers.

Chaucer's description of a forester is based upon his experiences as a deputy forester of North Petherton Park in Somersetshire.

The very first line of The Yeoman's description is the statement the Knight wanted no other servant. Kenneth J Thompson quoted Earle Birney as saying that a forester was the only attendant the Knight needed; he was a "huntsman-forester, knight's bodyguard, squire's attendant, lord's retainer, king's foot-soldier". The forester's job was to protect the vert and venison – the deer and the Royal forest they inhabited. The foresters not only discouraged poaching, but provided winter feed, and cared for newly born calves. The medieval English foresters also provided basic woodland management by preventing unauthorized grazing, and illegal logging. Another function of the forester was assist the King's Huntsmen in planning the royal hunts. The foresters knew the game animals, and where to find them.

When his lord was campaigning in wartime, the forester was capable of providing additional meat for the lord's table. During the 1358–60 campaign in France, Edward III had 30 falconers on horseback, and 60 couples (or pairs) of hounds.

The Yeoman has his "mighty bow" (most probably a longbow) at the ready, implying he is on duty serving as bodyguard against highwaymen and robbers. He carries a sheaf of arrows under his belt, which implies an arrow bag suspended from his belt.

Chaucer's description of The Yeoman has been interpreted as an iconographic representation of the dutiful servant, diligent and always ready to serve. In other words, the very picture of yeoman service.

Thompson quotes an interesting excerpt from the Anonimalle Chronicle. It is part of the description of King John II's journey to London, after he had been captured by the Black Prince at the Battle of Poitiers:

"On their way through England, the King of England aforesaid caused many lords and other people of the countryside to meet them, in a forest, dressed in coats and mantles of green. And when the said King of France passed through the said forest, the said men showed themselves in front of the King of France and his company, like robbers or malefactors with bows and arrows and with swords and bucklers; and the King of France marveled greatly at the sight, asking what manner of men these were. And the prince answered that these were men of England, forest-dweller, living as they pleased in the wild; and it was their custom to be arrayed thus every day."

The encounter was obviously some political posturing staged by Edward III for the benefit of the French king. It displayed the opposition the French army would face should the King decide to invade England.

==== The Friar's Tale ====
In the tale told by the Friar, the devil assumes the disguise of a yeoman dressed in a green tunic, a hat with black fringes, and carrying a bow and some arrows. The devil meets a summoner on his rounds. The tale continues as a scathing condemnation of the vile corruption of the summoner, whom the devil eventually takes to hell:

"And with that word this foul fiend seized him;
Body and soul he with the devil went
Where summoners have their heritage."

==== The Canon's Yeoman's Prologue ====
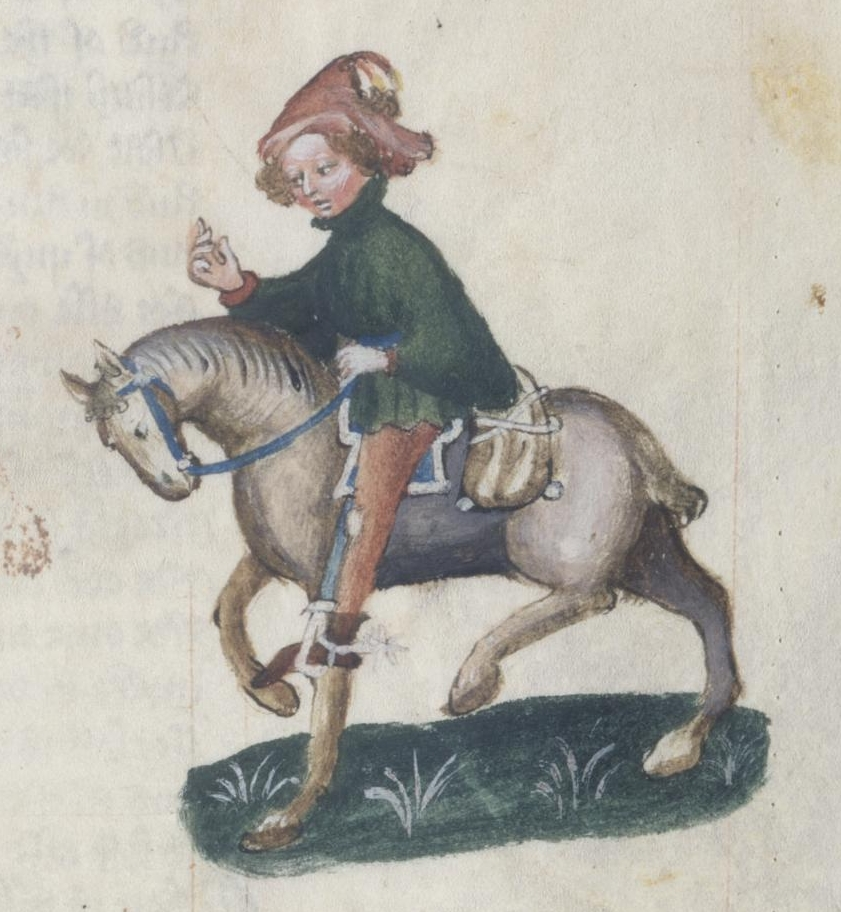
Painting of the Canon's Yeoman in the Ellesmere Manuscript

Chaucer constructed this tale quite differently than the other ones. The Canon and his Yeoman are not part of the original party. They are introduced when the group reaches Boughton under Blean, only 5 miles from Canterbury. From the top of Boughton Hill, those traveling along the Pilgrim's Way from London can see the towers of Canterbury Cathedral for the first time. This close proximity to Canterbury makes the entrance of the Canon and his Yeoman suspicious. Even more suspicious is the sudden exit of the Canon, leaving his Yeoman to tell the tale himself.

Two Chaucerian scholars have different but complementary interpretations, and neither concern a satire on alchemy. Albert E Hartung proposes that the Canon's Yeoman's Prologue is a device to include a previously written story into the Canterbury Tales as the Pars Secunda. Jackson J. Campbell proposes the interruption of the pilgrims' journey by the Canon and his yeoman so near to Canterbury is a device to prepare for the Parson's Tale, which is actually a sermon. Both interpretations place importance on the characterization of the Yeoman.

Hartung proposes that the real reason the Canon rode so fast and so hard to join the pilgrims is that he was seeking new victims. The Yeoman urges that it would be to the pilgrims' advantage to know the Canon better; that he is a remarkable man. The Canon knows the secret of turning the road they are traveling upside down, and repaving it with silver and gold. When The Host asks why The Canon is dressed in dirty rags, when he can afford clothes of the finest material, the Yeoman deftly replies that the Canon will never prosper, because his faith will not allow him to enrich himself though his knowledge.

The impression that it was time for the Canon and his Yeoman to move on is reinforced by the Yeoman's description of where they lived:

"In the outskirts of a town," said he,
"Lurking in hiding places and in dead-end alleys,
Where these robbers and these thieves by nature
Hold their private fearful residence, ..." (lines 657–660)

At this point the Canon reins his horse in beside his Yeoman, demanding that he not reveal any secrets. The Host dismisses the Canon's threats as mere bluster, and the Canon gallops away. The Yeoman's reaction implies that he may have hoped that this would happen. It was the Yeoman who noticed the Pilgrims leaving the hostelry that morning, and informed the Canon.

At this point, at the beginning of the Prima Pars ("First Part"), Campbell draws attention to the Yeoman's manner of speaking. He notes that the Yeoman rambles on impulsively in an unorganized fashion. His speech is full of free association and stream of consciousness.(p 174, 176) Seeing the Canon ride off unleashes a torrent of inventive against the Canon – and against himself. He sorrowfully remembers when his face was fresh and ruddy; now it is the color of lead. He used to wear fine clothing and have "splendid furnishings", now he wears a legging on his head. When their experiments failed to convert one gold coin into two, he borrowed the gold to pay the customer. Campbell describes the self-revulsion felt by the Yeoman for the futility of alchemy, and the deception and dishonesty employed while searching for the philosopher's stone. He hates it, but is fascinated by it at the same time.

Hartung agrees that Chaucer is presenting the pursuit of the philosopher's stone as an affliction He contrasts the Yeoman's Canon in the Prima Parta with the charlatan alchemist in the Pars Secunda ("Second Part") of the Yeoman's Tale. Huntung proposes that this part of the Tale was composed for an audience of clergymen. The alchemist is compared with the devil, and the "worshipful canons" who pursue the study of alchemy are no better than Judas, who betrayed Jesus for 30 pieces of silver. But the tirade is not against alchemy itself.

The penitent Yeoman reinforces the overall theme of pilgrimage, with its emphasis on repentance, and forgiveness. Chaucer is preparing the reader (or listener) for the Parson's Tale, which a sermon about penitence, "which can not fail to man nor to woman who through sin has gone astray from the right way to Jerusalem celestial".

=== Shakespeare's Henry V ===
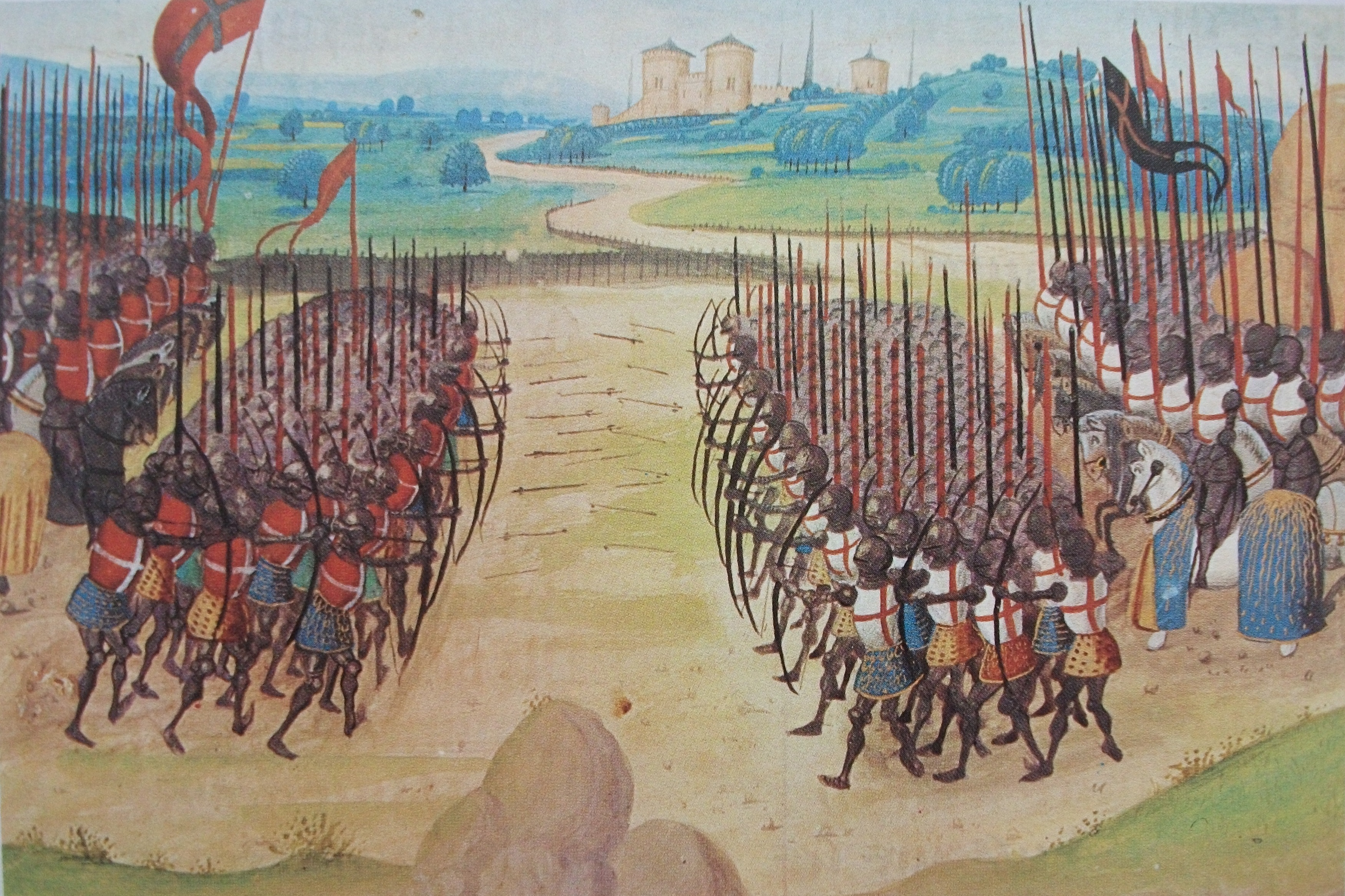
Early 15th century miniature of the Battle of Agincourt

The initial performance of William Shakespeare's play Henry V was in 1599. The focus of the play was the Battle of Agincourt, which had occurred 184 years before. It is a rousing patriotic play, but it was also propaganda. Elizabeth I sat upon a shaky throne. The Catholic threat from Spain and at home, war with Spain, concern over who she would marry, concern over the succession.

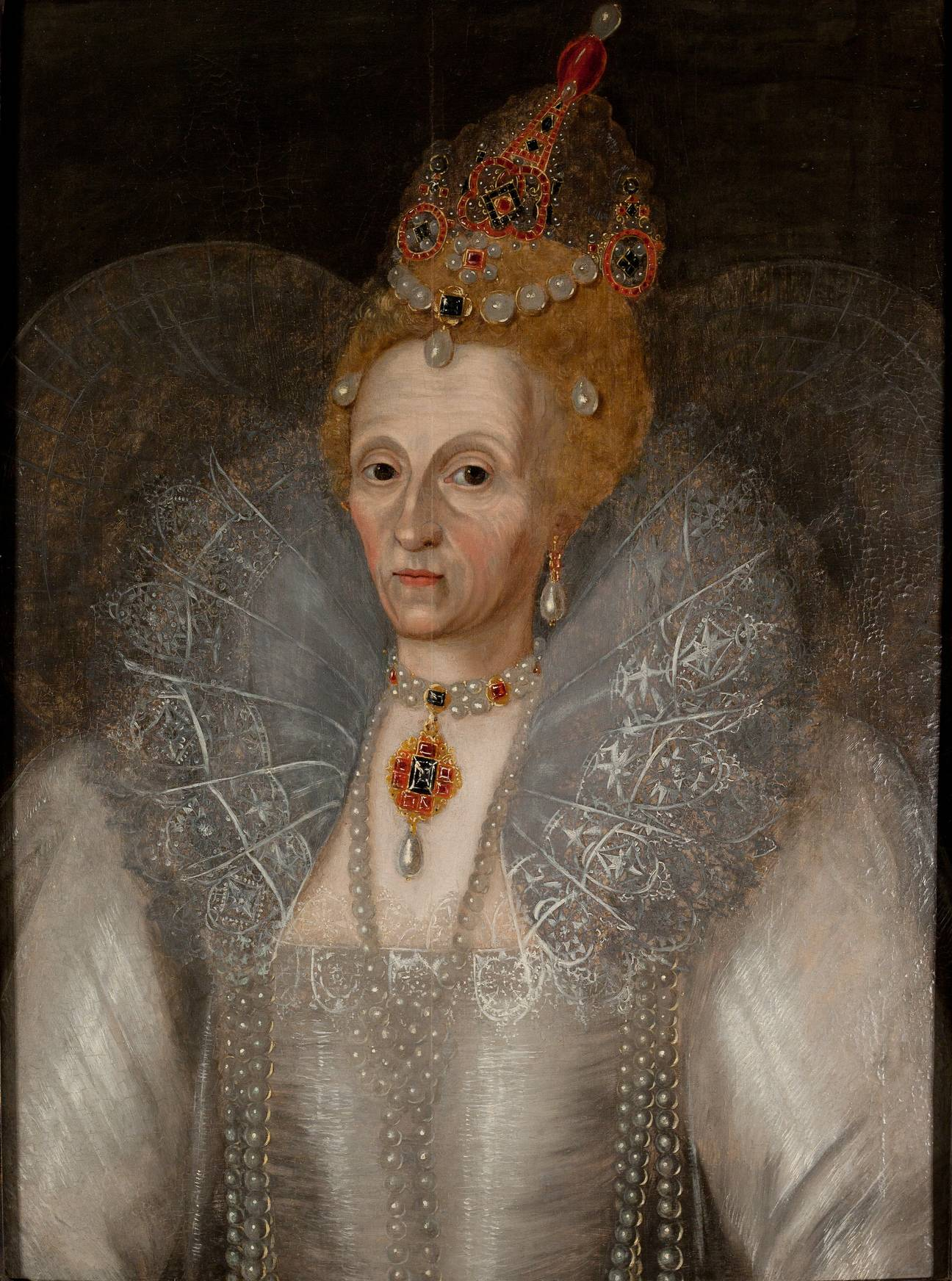
Elizabeth I as she appeared about 1595 in a portrait by Marcus Gheeraerts the Younger

The Nine Years War was underway. The English army had suffered defeat by the Irish at the Battle of the Yellow Ford in 1598. Elizabeth and her counsellors were preparing an invasion in 1599. However, her Privy Council was no longer composed of her most trusted advisors. Most of them – Robert Dudley, Earl of Leicester, Sir Francis Walsingham, and Sir Christopher Hatton had died by 1591. William Cecil, 1st Baron Burghley died in 1598. The council was split between Robert Cecil (Burghley's son) and Robert Devereux, 2nd Earl of Essex, who were locked in a bitter rivalry.

In 1599, Elizabeth was 66 years old, and her personal power was waning. She could not prevent the execution of her personal physician, Roderigo Lopez on a false charge of treason brought by the Earl of Essex. In spite of his irresponsibility, the Earl of Essex was appointed Lord Lord Lieutenant, and given command of the 16,000-man Irish invasion force.

Shakespeare wrote Henry V to rally support for the Ireland invasion. The play followed naturally after his Henry IV, Part 2, written between 1576 and 1599. Henry's victory at Agincourt in spite of overwhelming odds was the perfect plot. Shakespeare presented Henry's invasion of France and his Agincourt victory in all its complexity. The play can be interpreted either as a celebration of Henry's military skill, or as an examination of the moral and human cost of war.

Once more unto the breach, dear friends, once more,
Or close the wall up with our English dead!
...
And you, good yeomen,
Whose limbs were made in England, show us here
The mettle of your pasture. Let us swear
That you are worth your breeding, which I doubt not,
For there is none of you so mean and base
That hath not noble luster in your eyes.
...
Follow your spirit, and upon this charge
Cry “God for Harry, England, and Saint George!”

— Shakespeare, Henry V, act 3, scene 1, lines 26–37

In the famous rousing call to action in act 3, scene 1, Henry urges his yeomen to show the French what fine bowmen are raised in England. His yeomen are not "mean and base", but possess a "noble luster" in their eyes. "Unto the breach, dear friends, once more", he almost pleads. The yeomen have been besieging Harfleur for over a month; they are suffering from dysentery. "Follow your spirit" and charge, Henry commands.

This story shall the good man teach his son,
And Crispin Crispian shall ne’er go by,
From this day to the ending of the world,
But we in it shall be rememberèd—
We few, we happy few, we band of brothers;
For he today that sheds his blood with me
Shall be my brother; be he ne’er so vile,
This day shall gentle his condition;

— Shakespeare, Henry V, act 4, scene 3, lines 58–69

But Shakespeare's ultimate speech comes on 25 October in act 4, scene 3. Henry now calls his army a "band of brothers". The camaraderie of combat has made gentlemen of them all. When they hear a veteran speak of what happened on St Crispin's Day, "gentlemen in England" will be ashamed of being asleep in bed at the time such deeds were done.

== Yeomen in 19th century Romanticism ==
=== Sir Walter Scott ===
Walter Scott's Ivanhoe: a Romance was published to an English audience that was experiencing a medieval revival. His notes show that he had read much of the medieval poetry and chronicles which were reprinted during the 17th and 18th centuries. Ivanhoe was "... an historical reconstruction of 12th century England in the spiritual image of the 19th." Scott's highly detailed medieval setting attracts the interest of his reading audience; but his characters behave in a 19th-century manner in order to retain that interest. It was a device Scott employed to explore the struggle between good and evil in the guise of the struggle between the Anglo-Saxons and their Norman overlords shortly after the Conquest.

Scott invented The Captain/Locksley/Robin Hood (hereafter referred to as Locksley) by drawing from Thomas Percy's Reliques (1765) and Joseph Ritson's Robin Hood (1795), which contained all that was known at the time about the heroic outlaw. However, Scott's Locksley is closest to the yeoman depicted in A Gest of Robyn Hode. Simeone points out that Scott deliberately made Robin Hood a yeoman as well as an outcast in order to show that ordinary men, and not just the rich and powerful, have an important part to play in the making of a nation. Scott re-inforced his point by having Gurth and Wamba, thralls of Cedric, play pivotal roles as well. This was a new concept at the time, as it was during this period (1775–1779) that the American Revolution and the French Revolution occurred.

Scott refashioned the traditional hero of the Robin Hood ballads into an ancestral hero who would crush the misrule of evil men and restore the rightful rule of law.He demonstrates Locksley's physical superiority with the victory in the archery contest at the Tournament of Ashby. Locksley's ability to lead men in the field is displayed at the attack on Torquilstone castle. At the victory feast under the Tryst Tree, Locksley shares his high table with Cedric, the Saxon franklin, and the Norman Black Knight. His sense of justice supports the democratic system set up by the outlaws concerning the division of the spoils. Locksley's insistence on the Black Knight taking the horn as protection against Prince John's evil henchman Fitzurse demonstrates that he bows to the lawful authority of the King. In turn, the King himself bows to the noble spirit of the Yeoman:

For he that does good, having the unlimited power to do evil, deserves praise not only for the good which he performs, but for the evil which he forbears

— Walter Scott, Ivanhoe, p. 661

=== Howard Pyle ===
Howard Pyle's contribution to the Robin Hood revival of the 19th century was his richly illustrated children's book The Merry Adventures of Robin Hood. Pyle is the author who first portrayed Robin as a kind-hearted outlaw who "robs from the rich to give to the poor". Each chapter covered one of the Robin Hood tales and the chapter sequence was arranged to present a coherent narrative. The resulting storyline was reused in early films such as Douglas Fairbanks in Robin Hood and Errol Flynn's The Adventures of Robin Hood.

Pyle's visual and verbal depiction of the outlaw yeoman Robin Hood has become a 20th-century popular culture icon. Any resemblance to the yeoman of Gest, or with any possible historical persons who may have inspired the 15th–16th century ballads, is strictly coincidental. Pyle's storyline has been adapted to appeal to 20th century film audiences as a romanticized rousing action-adventure.

== See also ==
- Churl – Non-servile peasant
- Franklin – English feudal social class
- Plain Folk of the Old South – 1949 book by Frank Lawrence Owsley
