= Robin Hood and the Potter =

15th century ballad of Robin Hood

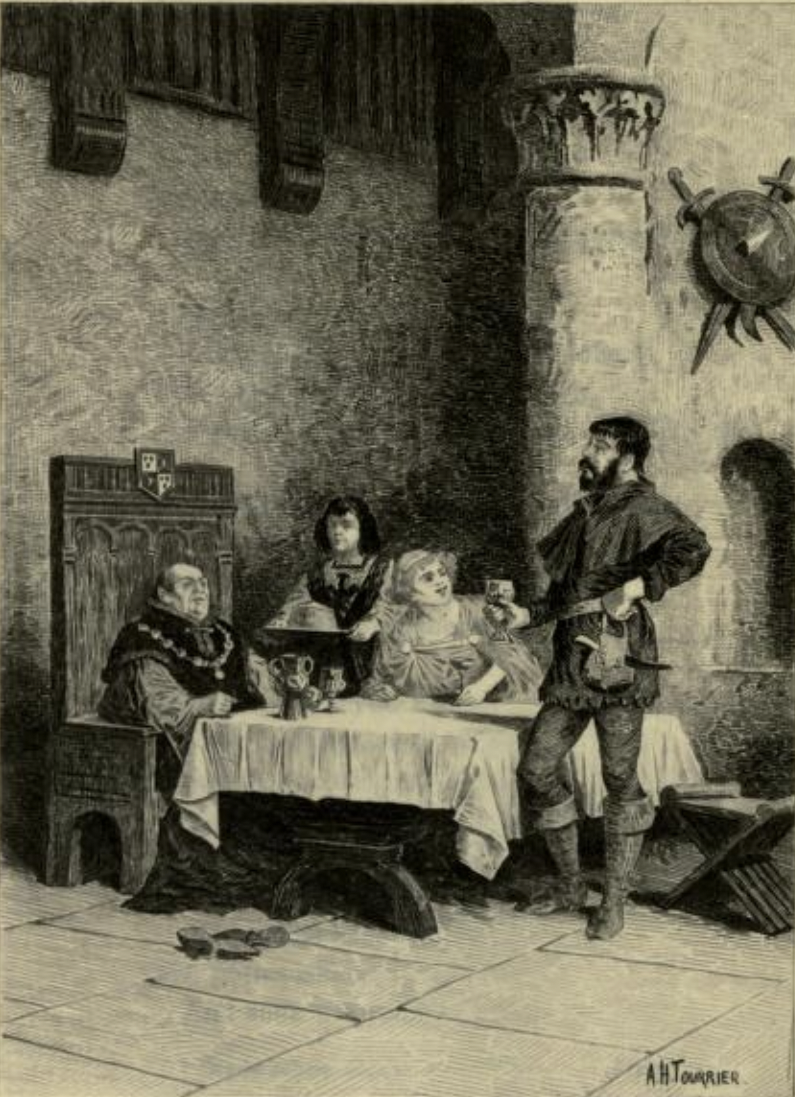
Robin, in disguise as a potter, eating a meal with the Sheriff of Nottingham and the Sheriff's wife

Robin Hood and the Potter is a 15th-century ballad of Robin Hood. While usually classed with other Robin Hood ballads, it does not appear to have originally been intended to be sung, but rather recited by a minstrel, and thus is closer to a poem. It is one of the very oldest pieces of the surviving Robin Hood legend, with perhaps only Robin Hood and the Monk older than it. It inspired a short play intended for use in May Day games, attested to around 1560. It was later published by Francis James Child as Child ballad #121 in his influential collection of popular ballads in the 1880s.

The story of Potter includes some common motifs that would feature in later Robin Hood stories: single combat where victory is not guaranteed; Robin Hood taking a disguise to blend in; an archery competition; and a naive sheriff who enters the greenwood where he is dramatically outwitted by the crafty outlaws who know the forest better. The tone of Potter is more comic than other early Robin Hood stories that were more violent, such as Robin Hood and the Monk or Robin Hood and Guy of Gisborne. Nobody dies, and the story concludes with the "lowde lawhyng" (loud laughing) of the Sheriff's wife.

== Plot ==
Y well prey the, god potter,
A ffelischepe well thow haffe?
Geffe me they clothing, and thow schalt hafe myne;
Y well go to Notynggam.
-- (with modern spelling)
I will pray thee, good potter,
A fellowship will thou have?
Give me thy clothing, and thou shalt have mine;
I will go to Nottingham.

— Robin Hood and the Potter, Stanza 24

Robin Hood and Little John spy a potter approaching down the path. Little John mentions that he once met the same potter at Wentbridge and fought him, and his sides are still sore from the encounter. Little John makes a bet with Robin that he won't be able to make him pay a toll. Robin accepts and demands a toll of a potter (pavage) for crossing a bridge in the forest. They fight a duel, Robin wielding a sword and buckler while the potter uses his staff, and the potter wins. The two reconcile and Robin Hood strikes a deal with the potter. The potter will stay in the Forest, while Robin disguises himself as the potter and travels to Nottingham to sell the pots. He charges ridiculously low prices and so sells them all; by his doing so, the Sheriff's wife is intrigued, and when Robin gives her his last pots for free, she invites him to dinner with her and the sheriff.

While at dinner the Sheriff's men are having an archery contest, Robin shows the Sheriff that he can shoot far better than the Sheriff's men, and he then explains that he can shoot that well because he was taught by Robin Hood. The sheriff asks him to lead him to the outlaw. Robin agrees, and when back in the forest the sheriff is ambushed by Robin's men. They take his money and his clothes. Because of the hospitality of the sheriff's wife in Nottingham, Robin lets him go free, telling him he must give his wife a white palfrey. On returning to Nottingham, the wife laughs at the Sheriff. She remarks that Robin has been paid back for the pots he gave to her.

Robin compensates the potter generously for the pots using the money taken from the Sheriff, paying him 10 pounds when the pots were only worth 2 nobles (equivalent to around two-thirds of a pound). He tells the potter that he is always welcome in the green wood.

== Manuscript history ==
The oldest manuscript of Potter surviving is kept in the Cambridge University Library and dates to around 1500, although the poem likely existed before this manuscript. Interpretation of the work is complicated by the execrable orthography and language skills of the writer; he seems to have been "half-literate" and includes various likely errors such as repetitions of lines he has already written. His spelling is also heavily inflected by Midlands dialect. Nevertheless, the manuscript is invaluable for giving insight into the state of the Robin Hood legend around 1500.

== Adaptations ==
A play entitled Robin Hood and the Potter and most likely based on the poem was created around 1560, likely for use in May Day festivals, and to conclude with a Morris dance. The play version is shorter than the poem, and rearranges events so that the dramatic duel between Robin and the potter occurs at the end rather than the start. It is found in the Copeland edition of A Mery Geste of Robyn Hoode, and includes touches appropriate for a May Game play such as the potter wearing a 'rose garlande' on his head.

Robin Hood and the Butcher is so similar to Potter in parts that it is often seen as an adaptation of the story rather than merely being inspired by it.

== Analysis ==
In the oldest manuscript, the minstrel "breaks the fourth wall" in parts and directly addresses the audience of "yemen" (yeoman). The work itself depicts Robin as a yeoman as well. After the potter defeats Robin, he shames him for his discourtesy in waylaying a fellow yeoman, and Robin even agrees with the criticism and offers the potter safe passage in the future. This aspect is perhaps flattering the intended audience of lesser craftsmen who were outranked by the landed gentry yet nevertheless were socially above the very poorest peasants of English society, by saying that Robin Hood was just like them. This notably contrasts with some stories of much later origin in which Robin would sometimes be a dispossessed nobleman or former knight.

The device of Robin disguising himself as a potter may have been taken from the older legends of Hereward the Wake, Eustace the Monk, and William Wallace. The story is also an early example of a motif seen in other ballads where Robin Hood meets his match, but through his charm either befriends or outright recruits the other fighter regardless. It is seen in works such as Robin Hood and the Tanner and Robin Hood and the Ranger, and is an element of Robin Hood and the Tinker.

The work's rhyme scheme is irregular, at least in the oldest version. It sometimes hews to the standard ballad stanza of ABCB, but has other partial rhymes, missing rhymes, or alternate rhymes such as ABAC and ABAB.

Robin's friendly relationship with the sheriff's wife is somewhat unusual in the earliest stories of Robin Hood, which generally restricted Robin's interaction with women to the Virgin Mary and the villainous prioress of Kirklees. Maid Marian does not appear in the earliest surviving stories. Potter, by contrast, seems to hint that the sheriff's wife is more than a little charmed by the mysterious potter giving her a gift.

The ballad was not directly included in the popular "garlands" of Robin Hood ballads popular in the 16th and 17th centuries. Instead, the similar Robin Hood and the Butcher version of the story was generally included.

Stephen Knight and Thomas Ohlgren praised the work for its "quick-moving and highly effective" plot and solid sense of irony and humor. They also admired the ballad as setting up Robin Hood's social and mythic status as someone leading a band of near equals with wit and bravery, against the new order forming in the cities. While a simple and comic tale, they remark that this simplicity is also what made the tale capable of easy spread and many retellings.
