= Robin Hood and the Butcher =

Traditional song

Robin Hood and the Butcher (Roud 3980, Child 122) is a story in the Robin Hood canon which has survived as, among other forms, a late seventeenth-century English broadside ballad, and is one of several ballads about the medieval folk hero that form part of the Child ballad collection, which is one of the most comprehensive collections of traditional English ballads. It may have been derived from the similar Robin Hood and the Potter.

== Synopsis ==
Robin Hood meets with a "jolly" butcher on horseback, on his way to sell his meat at a fair (1.9). Robin appreciates the butcher's good nature and asks him about his trade and where he lives. The butcher refuses to say where he lives, but tells Robin he is going to a fair in Nottingham, and in response Robin queries him about the price of his meat and horse, interested in becoming a butcher himself (although, in some variants he fights with the butcher). In all variants, Robin buys the butcher's goods and goes into Nottingham, where he sells a lot of meat at ridiculously low prices. The other butchers suspect that he is a prodigal who is wasting his inheritance: "For he sold more meat for one penny / than others could do for five / Which made the Butchers of Nottingham / [...] / to study as they did stand / Saying surely he was some Prodigal / that had sold his Fathers land" (2.19-25). They invite him to the sheriff's, where their guild is feasting, and Robin and the butchers make merry over food and wine. Since Robin proposes to pay for all their food and drink ("For the shot I will pay e're I go my way," Robin says [3.19]), the butchers and the Sheriff again speculate that he must have inherited and sold some land for a lot of money. The Sheriff asks if he has more animals to sell. Robin says he has two or three hundred beasts on one hundred acres of land and invites the Sheriff to see them, whereupon the Sheriff, with three hundred pounds of gold on his person, rides with him to Sherwood Forrest. Not knowing Robin's true identity, the Sheriff ironically hopes that they do not meet a certain "man they call Rob. Hood" (4.5). Once there, a hundred deer happen to appear and Robin shows them to the Sheriff, claiming them as his animals, but the Sheriff has decided he does not like Robin's company. Robin then summons Little John and the rest of his men with his horn. Robin takes the Sheriff's portmanteau and counts five hundred gold pounds in it, which he intends to keep for himself and the band. He then sends the Sheriff on his way home, jokingly commending himself to the Sheriff's wife before riding away laughing.

== Variations of the ballad ==
This ballad is an abridgment of an older ballad, Robin Hood and the Potter. There are two extant versions of "Robin Hood and the Butcher," Version A and Version B. Version B, which is the version summarized above, does not include a fight between Robin Hood and the butcher, which takes place in a missing part of Version A and in "Robin Hood and the Potter." In the version summarized above, however, Robin does mention a "shot" (3.19) during the feast of the guild, which probably refers to an archery contest between Robin and the Sheriff's men in which Robin was victorious and which is recorded in "Robin Hood and the Potter." Version A was discovered in the Percy Folio, the most important source for the Child ballads collection, but was missing three half-page sections (which is not surprising, given the way Percy and previous owners of the Folio treated it). There are several differences in the gross features and nuance of plot between the two versions. In Version A, Robin announces that the Sheriff has a vendetta against him (thus setting the stage for Robin's later encounter with the Sheriff), and the butcher he initially meets has a vicious dog that flies at Robin's face and is then killed. Robin also strikes at the butcher, presumably (according to the Potter and other Butcher ballads) engaging in a losing fight with him. Robin then buys the butcher's meat and travels to Nottingham disguised as a butcher, where he attracts the attention of the Sheriff's wife. She offers him and any of his company shelter, and Robin orders drink before going to the market. As in Version B, he sells the meat quickly and at a low price. Impressed, the other butchers invite him to come drink with them as a fellow in their craft. The account of Robin's feast with them is missing up to the Sheriff's offer of money for Robin's beasts, which Robin silently plans to steal when they are in Sherwood Forest. When the Sheriff, his body-guard butchers, and Robin arrive in the Forest, again, Robin is fortunate to see many deer which he can claim as his own, but the Sheriff is already suspicious. Robin summons his band with his horn and, instead of Little John and a few others, fifty archers come to join them. The denouement of the gathering is missing from this version, but in the next stanza the Sheriff has safely arrived home in Nottingham and is telling his wife what happened: as in the other version, Robin has stolen all the Sheriff's money and has complimented him on his wife (unbeknownst of whom Robin would have beheaded him), but in this version the reason for the compliment is clear. The Sheriff praises his wife for her kindness to Robin and Robin for teaching him a lesson, and vows never to set after him again.

== Historical and cultural significance ==
This ballad is part of a group of ballads about Robin Hood that in turn, like many of the popular ballads collected by Francis James Child, were in their time considered a threat to the Protestant religion. Puritan writers, like Edward Dering writing in 1572, considered such tales "'childish follye'" and "'witless devices.'" Writing of the Robin Hood ballads after A Gest of Robyn Hode, their Victorian collector Francis Child claimed that variations on the "'Robin met with his match'" theme, such as this ballad, are "sometimes wearisome, sometimes sickening," and that "a considerable part of the Robin Hood poetry looks like char-work done for the petty press, and should be judged as such." Child had also called the Roxburghe and Pepys collections (in which some of these ballads are included) "'veritable dung-hills [...], in which only after a great deal of sickening grubbing, one finds a very moderate jewel.'" However, as folklorist and ethnomusicologist Mary Ellen Brown has pointed out, Child's denigration of the later Robin Hood ballads is evidence of an ideological view he shared with many other scholars of his time who wanted to exclude cheap printed ballads such as these from their pedigree of the oral tradition and early literature. Child and others were reluctant to include such broadsides in their collections because they thought they "regularized the text, rather than reflecting and/or participating in tradition, which fostered multiformity." On the other hand, the broadsides are significant in themselves as showing, as English jurist and legal scholar John Selden (1584–1654) puts it, "'how the wind sits. As take a straw and throw it up in the air; you shall see by that which way the wind is, which you shall not do by casting up a stone. More solid things do not show the complexion of the times so well as ballads and libels.'" Even though the broadsides are cultural ephemera, unlike weightier tomes, they are important because they are markers of contemporary "current events and popular trends." It has been speculated that in his time Robin Hood represented a figure of peasant revolt, but the English medieval historian J. C. Holt has argued that the tales developed among the gentry, that he is a yeoman rather than a peasant, and that the tales do not mention peasants' complaints, such as oppressive taxes. Moreover, he does not seem to rebel against societal standards but to uphold them by being munificent, devout, and affable. Other scholars have seen the literature around Robin Hood as reflecting the interests of the common people against feudalism. The latter interpretation supports Selden's view that popular ballads provide a valuable window onto the thoughts and feelings of the common people on topical matters: for the peasantry, Robin Hood may have been a redemptive figure. The Roud Folksong Index lists 21 occurrences of this ballad, all but one in broadside collections or books. The exception was collected by a George Boswell from Herbert Roake in Clarksville, Tennessee on 19th December 1950.

== Library and archival holdings ==
The English Broadside Ballad Archive at the University of California, Santa Barbara holds two seventeenth-century broadside ballad versions of this tale: a copy in the Pepys collection at Magdalene College at the University of Cambridge (2.102) and another in the Roxburghe ballad collection at the British Library (3.529).

== Adaptations ==
This tale has reappeared in many books about the Robin Hood legend, including Howard Pyle's Merry Adventures of Robin Hood, although the threat to kill the sheriff at the end was often omitted. The so-called "Butcher ballads" in the Robin Hood legend and the early "Potter" ballad are still popular Robin Hood stories that are retold in many children's books.

Elements of this ballad also appeared in the 1955 TV series The Adventures of Robin Hood episode "A Guest for the Gallows" where Robin adopts the butcher's identity to rescue Will Stutely.

== References and notes ==
=== Bibliography ===
- Brown, Mary Ellen (2010). "Child's ballads and the broadside conundrum". In Patricia Fumerton; Anita Guerrini; Kris McAbee (eds.). Ballads and Broadsides in Britain, 1500–1800. Burlington, VT: Ashgate Publishing Company. pp. 57–72. ISBN 978-0-7546-6248-8.
- Child, Francis James, ed. (2003) [1888–1889]. The English and Scottish Popular Ballads. Vol. 3. Mineola, NY: Dover Publications.
- Fumerton, Patricia; Guerrini, Anita (2010). "Introduction: straws in the wind". In Patricia Fumerton; Anita Guerrini; Kris McAbee (eds.). Ballads and Broadsides in Britain, 1500–1800. Burlington, VT: Ashgate Publishing Company. pp. 1–9. ISBN 978-0-7546-6248-8.
- Holt, J. C. (1989). Robin Hood. Thames and Hudson. ISBN 0-500-27541-6.
- Singman, Jeffrey L. (1998). Robin Hood: The Shaping of the Legend. Greenwood Publishing Group. ISBN 0-313-30101-8.
- Watt, Tessa (1993). Cheap Print and Popular Piety, 1550–1640. Cambridge Studies in Early Modern British History. Cambridge University Press. ISBN 9780521458276.
