= Robin Hood and the Monk =

15th-century ballad

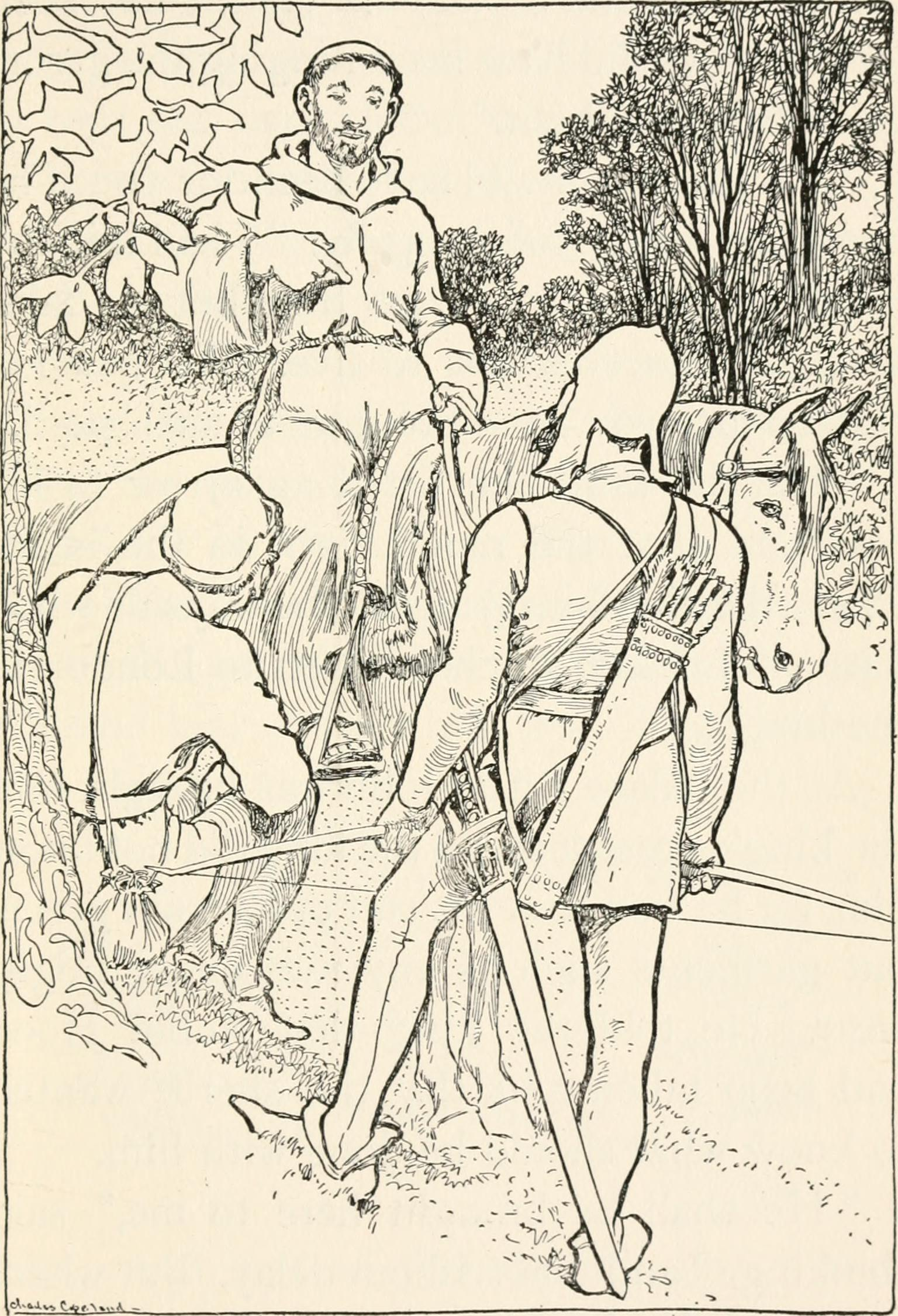
An illustration from Life in the Greenwood (1909)

Robin Hood and the Monk is a Middle English ballad and one of the oldest surviving ballads of Robin Hood. The earliest surviving document with the work is from around 1450, and it may have been composed even earlier in the 15th century. It is also one of the longest ballads at ninety stanzas and approximately 360 lines. It is considered one of the best of the original ballads of Robin Hood.

In Robin Hood and the Monk, Robin goes to Nottingham for Mass, but has a dispute with Little John on the way. In Nottingham, he is spotted by a monk and captured. Little John, Much the Miller's Son, and other Merry Men intercept the monk, kill him, and launch a successful plot to free Robin from prison. Robin and Little John are reconciled. The King and Sheriff are left frustrated at Robin's escape, although they are impressed at Little John's loyalty.

== Plot ==
Beside hym stode a gret-hedid munke,
I pray to God woo he be!
Fful sone he knew gode Robyn,
As sone as hym se.
-- (with modern spelling)
Beside him stood a great-headed monk,
I pray to God woe he be!
For soon he knew good Robin,
As soon as him see.

— Robin Hood and the Monk, Stanza 19

Little John talks of the May morning, but Robin Hood is still unhappy because he cannot go to Mass or matins. He decides to go to a service in Nottingham, inspired by his devotion to the Virgin Mary. "Moche, the mylner sun" (Much the Miller's Son) advises him to take at least twelve men; he refuses and goes with only Little John.

On the way, he makes a bet with Little John, loses, and refuses to pay when they cannot agree on the payout. Little John leaves him.

Robin goes to St. Mary's in Nottingham and prays. A monk whom he had robbed sees him and tells the sheriff, who gathers a group of many men to arrest Robin. Robin fights them off with a two-handed sword, wounding many and killing twelve of the sheriff's men. His sword breaks while fighting the sheriff, and he runs into the church in an attempt to escape.

The text breaks off at this point; there is a page missing that presumably described Robin's capture and the news reaching his men. The story continues with the men's shock, and Little John being the only one to keep his wits about him. He declares they must rescue him. They catch the monk riding with a little page; Little John kills the monk for his role in Robin's capture, and Much kills the page so that the page cannot spread word of the ambush.

Little John and Much go to the (unnamed) king with the monk's letters and tell him the monk died on the way. The king gives them gifts and directions to bring Robin Hood to him. Little John brings the letters to the sheriff and tells him that the monk did not come because the king had made him an abbot. They get into the prison, kill the jailer, and escape with Robin. The sheriff does not dare face the king. Robin says that Little John has done him a good turn in return for the ill one he played, and offered to be his man; Little John still wants him to remain his master.

The king is enraged that the men managed to fool him, but admits that Little John is the most loyal man in England, and since they were all fooled, lets it go.

== Original work and later publications ==
The work was preserved in Cambridge University manuscript Ff.5.48, albeit heavily damaged by wear. That document dates to around or after 1450, but early versions of the story may have circulated earlier; William Langland's Piers Plowman makes reference to circulating tales of Robin Hood in 1377, and Walter Bower describes a Robin Hood story similar in theme in the 1440s. A stray leaf of some of the later stanzas has been found as well; the textual variations between the leaf and Ff.5.48 are minor and unimportant. The work was obscure in the 16th, 17th, and 18th centuries, and not printed among the "garlands" (collections) of Robin Hood ballads of that era. The story was first printed and given its title as "Robyn Hode and the Munke" in 1806 by Robert Jamieson in his work Popular Ballads And Songs From Tradition. Jamieson's edition was criticized for having various errors as well as being very different from the original; Charles Henry Hartshorne published a version that was more loyal to the Cambridge manuscript in 1829, an updated version of Joseph Ritson's Robin Hood in 1832 included the work under the title "Robin Hood and the Monk", and Frederick Madden published his own version in 1833. Francis James Child included it in his Child Ballads as #119 in the late 1800s.

The work may have been originally recited rather than sung, rendering it more an epic poem than a ballad; it refers to itself as a "talking" in its last verse:

Thus endys the talkyng of the munke
And Robyn Hode i-wysse;
God, that is ever a crowned kyng,
Bryng us all to his blisse.

However, this is uncertain, since the word "talking" could also mean a written narrative in Middle English.

There are notable parallels between this ballad and that of Adam Bell, Clym of the Cloughe and Wyllyam of Cloudeslee. Historian James Holt thought that the tale was potentially influenced by Adam Bell and thus less "authentic" than certain other early Robin Hood legends that lacked obvious surviving analogs.

== Influence and reception ==
It is impossible to know for sure how popular the ballad was in the 15th century: whether it was rare and the copy survived via luck, or common. However, many of the themes seen in later ballads are in this ballad as well, such as Robin Hood's devotion to the Virgin Mary and his turbulent relationship with Little John. This lends support to the suggestion that either it or a similar source was likely in circulation among late 15th century listeners, and influenced these later ballads. Despite this apparent influence, it does not appear to have been particularly common in the repertoire of sung ballads of the 16th and 17th century, as the sole nearly complete copy of the ballad found was obscure and old.

Robin Hood and the Monk is generally considered one of the artistically best and most literarily well-crafted of the surviving tales of Robin Hood. Holt wrote that it was a "blood and thunder adventure" that was crisply told, although a "shallow" work as well whose only moral is its paean to loyalty at the end. Child wrote that "Too much could not be said in praise of this ballad, but nothing need be said."
