= Eckardt =

Eckardt is a surname, and may refer to:

- A. Roy Eckardt (1918–1998), American Methodist theologian and pastor
- Adelaide C. Eckardt (born 1943), American politician
- Emanuel Eckardt (born 1942), German journalist and caricaturist
- Felix von Eckardt (1903–1979), German journalist and politician
- Guido Hermann Eckardt (1873–1951), German musician and journalist
- Heinrich von Eckardt (1861–1944), German diplomat
- Hella Eckardt, British archaeologist
- Jason Eckardt (born 1971), American composer
- Jens Eckardt (born 1968), Danish sailor
- Lorraine Eckardt (1914–1991), American composer
- Marcel Eckardt (born 1989), German snooker referee
- Marianne Eckardt (1913–2018), German-born American psychoanalyst, translator, and editor
- Reinhold Eckardt (1918–1942), German World War II fighter pilot
- René Eckardt (born 1990), German footballer
- Wolf Von Eckardt (1918–1995), American writer

== See also ==
- Eckart
- Eckerd (disambiguation)
- Eckhart (disambiguation)
- Eckhardt
- Ekkehard
