= Eckert (surname) =

Eckert is a German surname, a phonetic variant of Eckhardt.

- Allan W. Eckert (1931–2011), American historical novelist
- Andrea Eckert (born 1958), Austrian actress
- Carter Eckert (1945–2024), American historian
- Charles R. Eckert (1868–1959), U.S. congressman from Pennsylvania
- Claudia Eckert (disambiguation), multiple people
- David Eckert (born 1991), German politician
- Dennis Eckert (born 1997), German footballer
- Ernst R. G. Eckert (1904–2004), German scientist
- Eugen Eckert (born 1954) German minister, singer-songwriter and academic teacher
- Franz Eckert (1852–1916), German musician
- Fred J. Eckert (born 1941), U.S. congressman from New York
- Fritz Eckert (1852–1920), Swedish architect
- George Nicholas Eckert (1802–1865), U.S. congressman from Pennsylvania
- Horst Eckert, birth name of Janosch, German children's author and illustrator
- John Eckert (musician) (born 1939), American trumpeter
- J. Presper Eckert (1919–1995), American electrical engineer, co-inventor of ENIAC
- Max Eckert-Greifendorff (1868–1938), German geographer
- Karl Anton Eckert (1820–1879), German conductor and composer
- Lars Eckert (born 1983), German rugby union player
- Leon Eckert (born 1995), German politician
- Robb Eckert, American politician
- Robert A. Eckert (born 1954), American businessman
- Tobias Eckert (born 1980), German politician
- Tonda Eckert (born 1993), German football manager
- Valentine Eckert (1733–1821), German-born Pennsylvania politician, militia officer, and judge
- Volker Eckert (1959–2007), German truck driver and serial killer
- Wallace John Eckert (1902–1971), German-American astronomer
- William Eckert (1909–1971), U.S. Air Force general and commissioner of Major League Baseball
- Win Scott Eckert, author

== Fictional characters ==
- Bill Eckert, Jenny Eckert, Nancy Eckert, Sly Eckert from the American TV series General Hospital

== See also ==
- Eckart (disambiguation)
- Eggert
- Ecker (surname)
