= Eckhardt =

Eckhardt is a German surname surname and a given name. Notable people with the name include:

== Surname ==
- Edris Eckhardt (1905–1998), American ceramic and glass artist
- Elizabeth Eckhardt May (1899–1996), American home economist
- Franz Eckhardt (born 1927), Austrian bobsledder
- Fred Eckhardt (1926–2015), American brewer and writer
- Fritz Eckhardt (1907–1995), Austrian actor, director, and writer
- Gisela Eckhardt (born 1926), German physicist and co-developer of the Raman laser
- Jeffrey Edward Eckhardt (born 1965), English footballer
- Gregory Eckhardt (born 1989), American soccer player
- Jacob Eckhardt (1835–1881), American Republican member of the Wisconsin State Assembly
- Johann Georg von Eckhart (1664–1730), German historian and linguist
- Johann-Heinrich Eckhardt (1896–1945), German general in the Wehrmacht during World War II
- Johnny Eckhardt (1911–1991), American freak show performer
- Julius Eckhardt Raht (1826–1879), German engineer and businessman, pioneer of the mining and smelting of copper in Eastern Tennessee
- Kai Eckhardt (born 1961), German composer and bassist
- Kate Eckhardt (born 1997), Australian slalom canoeist
- Linda West Eckhardt (born 1939), American culinary writer
- Maik Eckhardt (born 1970), German sport shooter
- Neele Eckhardt (born 1992), German triple jumper
- Ox Eckhardt (1901–1951), American baseball player
- Oliver Eckhardt (1873–1952), American actor
- Peter Ralph Eckhardt (born 1960), Australian slalom canoeist
- Robert C. Eckhardt (1913–2001), Texas congressman
- Sarah Eckhardt (born 1964), American attorney and politician
- Sean Eckhardt (born 1970), American former figure skater, retired boxer, and reality television personality
- Sophie-Carmen Eckhardt-Gramatté (1899–1974), Russian-born Canadian composer and virtuoso pianist and violinist
- Todd Eckhart, former member of the American eight-piece ska/soul band The Pietasters
- Walter Eckhardt (1906–1994), German politician of the All-German Bloc/League of Expellees and Deprived of Rights (GB/BHE) and later CSU
- William Eckhardt (lawyer), American lawyer and formerly military officer
- William Eckhardt (trader) (born 1955), American commodities and futures trader and fund manager

== Given name ==
- Meister Eckhart (1260–1328), German theologian, philosopher, and mystic
- Eckhardt Schultz (born 1964), West German rower
- Eckhardt Tielscher (born 1942), German volleyball player

== Fictional characters ==
- Lt. Max Eckhardt, in the 1989 American superhero film Batman, directed by Tim Burton
- Thomas Eckhardt, in the television series Twin Peaks

== See also ==
- Eckhard
- Eckert
