= Eckert =

Eckert may refer to:

- Eckert (surname)
- Eckert, Colorado, a small town in the United States
- Eckert, Michigan, a historic settlement
- Eckert Building
- Eckert (crater), on the moon, named for American astronomer Wallace John Eckert
- 1750 Eckert

== See also ==
- Eckart (disambiguation)
- Ecker (surname)
- Eckerle, a surname
