= Eckler =

Eckler is a surname. Notable people with the surname include:

- A. Ross Eckler (1901–1991), director of the U.S. Census Bureau
- A. Ross Eckler Jr. (born 1927), American scientist and mathematician
- Harry Eckler (1916–2011), Canadian softball player
- Rebecca Eckler (born 1973), Canadian journalist and author

== See also ==
- Bricker & Eckler, law firm in the midwestern United States with approximately 160 attorneys and 3 offices in Ohio
- Ekeler, surname
- Ecker (surname)
