= List of IMG Academy alumni =

The following is a list of notable alumni of IMG Academy in Bradenton, Florida. Founded in 1978, the academy trains thousands of youth, high school, collegiate and professional athletes annually. Many of the alumni listed below did not attend or graduate from IMG Academy, but participated in training there.

== American football ==
- Bear Alexander, defensive lineman
- Kaytron Allen, running back
- Zack Annexstad, quarterback
- Jhamon Ausbon, wide receiver
- Tyler Booker, offensive guard
- Ja'Corey Brooks, wide receiver
- Noah Cain, running back
- Jihaad Campbell, linebacker
- DeMonte Capehart, defensive tackle
- Andre Cisco, safety
- Marc Colombo, offensive tackle and coach
- Angelo Crowell, linebacker
- Charbel Dabire, defensive linemen
- Grant Delpit, safety
- Daylen Everette, cornerback
- Daniel Faalele, offensive tackle
- Thomas Fletcher, long snapper
- Deondre Francois, quarterback
- Hjalte Froholdt, offensive guard
- Jerrick Gibson, running back
- Robert Hainsey, center
- Jordan Hall, linebacker
- K. J. Hamler, wide receiver
- Mike Jenkins, cornerback
- Mikel Jones, linebacker
- Tony Jones Jr., running back
- Joshua Kaindoh, defensive end
- Chris Kelsay, defensive end
- Josh Lambo, kicker
- JC Latham, offensive tackle
- Tyler Mabry, tight end
- Francis Mauigoa, offensive tackle
- J. J. McCarthy, quarterback
- Tre' McKitty, tight end
- Dylan Moses, linebacker
- Kellen Mond, quarterback
- Isaac Nauta, tight end
- Evan Neal, offensive tackle
- Greg Newsome II, cornerback
- Michael O'Connor, quarterback
- K. J. Osborn, wide receiver
- Shea Patterson, quarterback
- Jaden Rashada, quarterback
- Sammis Reyes, tight end and basketball player
- Desmond Ricks, defensive back
- Eli Ricks, cornerback
- Ellis Robinson IV, cornerback
- Cesar Ruiz, guard
- Keon Sabb, safety
- Bo Scarbrough, running back
- Nolan Smith, edge rusher
- Saivion Smith, cornerback
- Tyree St. Louis, offensive tackle
- David Stone, defensive tackle
- Carnell Tate, wide receiver
- Charles Turner III, center
- DJ Turner, cornerback
- Taron Vincent, defensive tackle
- Kenyatta Walker, offensive tackle
- Fabian Washington, cornerback
- Anthony Weaver, defensive end
- Kamari Wilson, safety

== Baseball ==
=== IMG Academy High School ===
- Brady Aiken, pitcher drafted by Houston Astros as first pick of 2014 MLB draft, but did not sign; 17th pick of 2015 MLB draft by Cleveland Indians
- Blaze Alexander, shortstop for the Arizona Diamondbacks
- Logan Allen, pitcher drafted by Boston Red Sox in 2015 MLB draft, traded in deal for Craig Kimbrel, debuted for the San Diego Padres in 2019
- Alfredo L. Escalera, selected by Kansas City Royals in the 2012 MLB Draft as youngest player drafted in Major League history
- Paolo Espino, pitcher for the Toronto Blue Jays, formerly for the Milwaukee Brewers, Texas Rangers, and Washington Nationals
- Jake Gelof (born 2002), third baseman, second round pick of the Los Angeles Dodgers in the 2023 MLB draft
- Elijah Green, outfielder, first round pick for the Washington Nationals
- Mac Horvath, outfielder, second round pick for the Baltimore Orioles
- Brennan Malone, drafted by the Pittsburgh Pirates
- L. J. Mazzilli, drafted by New York Mets in 2013
- John Ryan Murphy, catcher drafted by New York Yankees in round 2 of 2009 MLB draft
- Jacob Nix, former pitcher for the San Diego Padres
- Tyler Pastornicky, shortstop drafted by Toronto Blue Jays in 2008
- Chris Perez, pitcher drafted by St. Louis Cardinals in 2006, All-Star in 2011 and 2012
- Kendall Williams, drafted by the Toronto Blue Jays in 2019
- James Wood, outfielder for the Washington Nationals

=== Professional training program ===
- Pedro Álvarez, 2010 National League Rookie of the Month for September; third baseman for Baltimore Orioles
- Pat Burrell, two-time World Series champion and Golden Spikes Award recipient
- Ian Desmond, 2012 and 2016 All-Star, 3-time Silver Slugger Award recipient
- Adam Dunn, two-time MLB All-Star; played with Cincinnati Reds, Washington Nationals, Arizona Diamondbacks, Chicago White Sox, and Oakland Athletics
- Josh Hamilton, five-time MLB All-Star and 2010 AL Most Valuable Player
- Kyle Kendrick, pitcher for Philadelphia Phillies, won a World Series championship with the organization in 2008
- Joe Mauer, MLB Hall of Fame, five-time MLB All-Star, three-time AL batting champion, three-time Gold Glove Award winner and four-time Silver Slugger award winner for Minnesota Twins, AL MVP (2009)
- Andrew McCutchen, five-time All-Star, Gold Glove Award (2012), Silver Slugger Award (2012) and National League Most Outstanding Player (2012) for Pittsburgh Pirates, NL MVP (2013)
- Jamie Moyer, MLB pitcher, 26-year career, selected to All-Star team in 2003; received Roberto Clemente and Lou Gehrig Awards
- Jose Ramirez, MLB infielder, six-time All-Star, four-time Silver Slugger Award winner, 3rd place AL MVP finalist 2018
- Gary Sheffield, nine-time MLB All-Star, 1997 World Series champion, five-time Silver Slugger Award winner and 1992 Comeback Player of the Year
- Joey Votto, MLB first baseman, 5-time All-Star, winner of 2010 National League MVP award, Hank Aaron Award, and Lou Marsh Trophy as Canada's athlete of the year
- Neil Walker, MLB infielder, 2010 Baseball America's All-Rookie Team
- Vernon Wells, MLB outfielder, three-time All-Star, three-time Gold Glove Award recipient and Silver Slugger Award winner
- Ryan Zimmerman, MLB first baseman, two-time All-Star, Gold Glove Award recipient, and Lou Gehrig Memorial Award winner

== Basketball ==
- Darius Acuff Jr. (2025), Arkansas Razorbacks
- Amari Allen (2025 - transferred), Alabama Crimson Tide
- Renaldo Balkman (2003 - transferred), New York Knicks, Denver Nuggets, South Carolina Gamecocks, also played in Philippines, Venezuela, Puerto Rico, Mexico, and Nicaragua
- Ramel Bradley (2004), Kentucky Wildcats men's basketball, also played in Croatia, France, Israel, Turkey
- Jaden Bradley (2022), college basketball player
- Michael Beasley (2007 - transferred), Kansas State Wildcats, Miami Heat, Minnesota Timberwolves, Phoenix Suns, Houston Rockets, Milwaukee Bucks, New York Knicks, Los Angeles Lakers, also played in China and Puerto Rico
- Satnam Singh Bhamara (2014), was drafted 52nd overall to the Dallas Mavericks, played in the NBA G League and Canada, now signed to AEW
- Dwayne Bacon (2015 - transferred), Charlotte Hornets, Orlando Magic, Florida State Seminoles, also played in Monaco, China, Greece, Puerto Rico, and Russia
- Armando Bacot (2019), Memphis Grizzlies, North Carolina Tar Heels
- Blue Cain, player for the University of Georgia
- Earl Clark, power forward for Club Atlético Aguada
- Carson Cooper (2022), center for the Michigan State Spartans
- Erick Dampier, former professional basketball player for Indiana Pacers, Golden State Warriors, Atlanta Hawks, Dallas Mavericks, Miami Heat
- DeAndre Daniels, professional basketball player; college player at UConn
- Darius Days, basketball player for the Illawarra Hawks
- Trevon Duval (2017), point guard who went undrafted in the 2018 NBA draft, then signed by Milwaukee Bucks on a two-way contract
- Zach Edey (2020), center for the Memphis Grizzlies, drafted 9th overall in the 2024 NBA Draft
- Jesse Edwards (2019), Center for the West Virginia Mountaineers
- Donnie Freeman, forward for the Syracuse Orange
- Keyonte George (2022), guard for the Utah Jazz
- Josh Green (2019), shooting guard for Charlotte Hornets
- Taurean Green, professional basketball player; drafted in 2nd round (52nd overall) in 2007 by Portland Trail Blazers; also played for Denver Nuggets
- Jett Howard (2022), guard for the Orlando Magic
- Brandon Huntley-Hatfield, forward for the NC State Wolfpack
- Jonathan Isaac (2016), forward for Orlando Magic, drafted 6th overall in the 2017 NBA Draft
- Kenny Kadji (born 1988), Cameroonian basketball player in the Israeli Basketball Premier League
- Alex Karaban, forward for the Connecticut Huskies
- Kenyon Martin Jr., son of Kenyon Martin, forward for the Los Angeles Clippers
- Mangok Mathiang (born 1992), Australian-Sudanese basketball player for Hapoel Eilat of the Israeli Basketball Premier League
- Chris McCullough, power forward
- Dwight Powell (2010), forward for Dallas Mavericks
- Lester Quiñones, NBA G League
- Efton Reid (2021), center for the Wake Forest Demon Deacons
- Olivier Rioux, center for the Florida Gators
- Ricky Sanchez, selected in 2nd round of 2005 NBA draft by Denver Nuggets; played for Santurce Crabbers of National Superior Basketball League of Puerto Rico
- Terrence Shannon Jr., guard for the Minnesota Timberwolves, drafted 27th overall in the 2024 NBA Draft
- Anfernee Simons (2018), drafted 24th overall in the 2018 NBA draft directly out of high school, winner of the 2021 NBA Dunk Contest
- Jaden Springer (2020), shooting guard for Utah Jazz
- D'Mitrik Trice, point guard for BK Patrioti Levice of the Slovak Basketball League
- Jarace Walker (2022), basketball player
- Romello White (born 1998), power forward for Hapoel Eilat of the Israeli Basketball Premier League
- Benny Williams (2021), Syracuse Orange forward
- Mark Williams (2020), center for Charlotte Hornets, drafted 15th overall in the 2022 NBA Draft

== Golf ==
- Laetitia Beck
- Emiliano Grillo
- Jessica Korda
- Nelly Korda
- Lucas Wilson

== Lacrosse ==
- Tehoka Nanticoke

== Soccer ==
- Eddie Ababio
- Faris Abdi
- Freddy Adu
- Nelson Akwari
- Kevin Alston
- Jozy Altidore
- Bernardo Añor
- Bryan Arguez
- Corey Ashe
- Eric Avila
- DaMarcus Beasley
- Kyle Beckerman
- Nikolas Besagno
- Zak Boggs
- Carlos Borja
- Jonathan Bornstein
- Michael Bradley
- Craig Capano
- Casey Castle
- Jordan Cila
- Matt Clare
- Bobby Convey
- Michelle Cooper
- Steve Cronin
- Steven Curfman
- Kenny Cutler
- Matthew Dallman
- Kyle Davies
- Justin Detter
- John DiRaimondo
- Landon Donovan
- Greg Eckhardt
- Ben Everson
- Gabriel Farfan
- Michael Farfan
- Brian Fekete
- Eddie Gaven
- Guillermo Gonzalez
- Adolfo Gregorio
- Joseph Gyau
- Happy Hall
- Jeremy Hall
- Michael Harrington
- Kyle Helton
- Cameron Hepple
- Martin Hutton
- Christian Ibeagha
- Amaechi Igwe
- Stefan Jerome
- Christian Jimenez
- Aron Jóhannsson
- Eddie Johnson
- Hosei Kijima
- Quavas Kirk
- Perry Kitchen
- Nick Kolarac
- Asa Kryst
- Josh Lambo
- Chris Lancos
- Eric Lichaj
- Zac MacMath
- Mike Magee
- Taurean Manders
- Laurent Manuel
- Justin Mapp
- Peri Marošević
- Jamie McGuinness
- Jack McInerney
- Devon McKenney
- Ellis McLoughlin
- Tommy Meyer
- Nick Millington
- Kyle Nakazawa
- Oguchi Onyewu
- Emilio Orozco
- Matt Orr
- Pan Zecheng
- Heath Pearce
- Brian Perk
- Jacob Peterson
- Tyler Polak
- Santino Quaranta
- Charlie Reiter
- Diego Restrepo
- Robbie Rogers
- Soony Saad
- Josh Sargent
- Kofi Sarkodie
- Jordan Seabrook
- Brek Shea
- Brian Span
- Jonathan Spector
- Eugene Starikov
- Michael Stephens
- Jordan Stone
- Danny Szetela
- Neven Subotic
- Ryan Thompson
- Sébastien Thurière
- Joseph Toby
- Erika Tymrak
- Kirk Urso
- Julian Valentin
- Indiana Vassilev
- Korey Veeder
- Marco Vélez
- Blake Wagner
- Anthony Wallace
- Jamie Watson
- Chase Wileman
- Sheanon Williams
- Tanner Wolfe
- Drew Yates
- Alex Yi
- Eriq Zavaleta
- Preston Zimmerman
- Trevor Zwetsloot
