= Paul-Henri Mathieu =

French tennis player (born 1982)

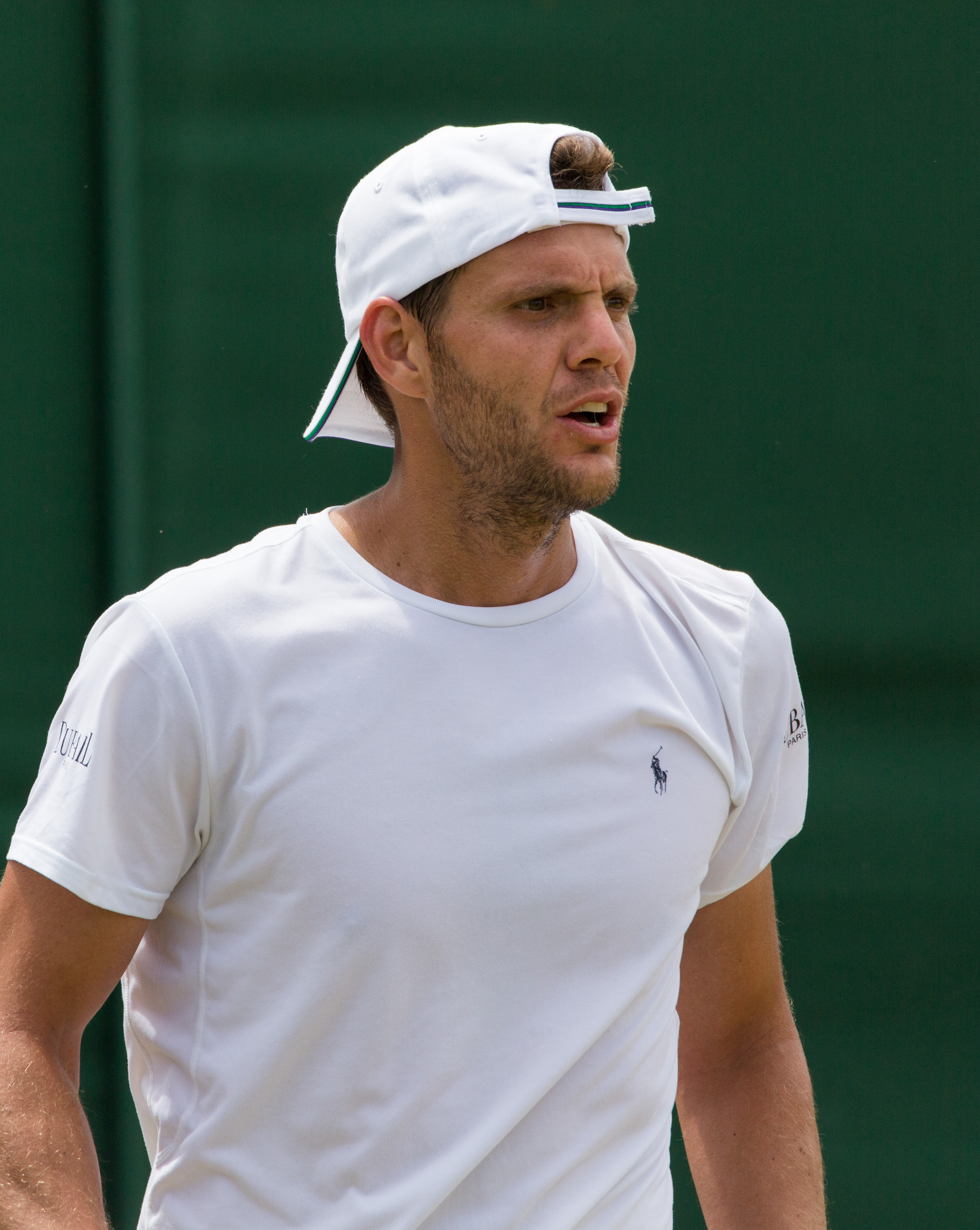
- Mathieu at the 2015 Wimbledon qualifying tournament
- Country (sports): France
- Residence: Geneva, Switzerland
- Born: 12 January 1982 (age 44) Strasbourg, France
- Height: 1.85 m (6 ft 1 in)
- Turned pro: 1999
- Retired: 31 October 2017
- Plays: Right-handed (two-handed backhand)
- Prize money: US$6,299,093

Singles
- Career record: 276–306
- Career titles: 4
- Highest ranking: No. 12 (7 April 2008)

Grand Slam singles results
- Australian Open: 4R (2006, 2008)
- French Open: 4R (2002, 2008)
- Wimbledon: 4R (2007, 2010)
- US Open: 3R (2004, 2010)

Other tournaments
- Olympic Games: QF (2008)

Doubles
- Career record: 30–88
- Career titles: 1
- Highest ranking: No. 103 (15 September 2008)

Grand Slam doubles results
- Australian Open: 1R (2005, 2009, 2017)
- French Open: 2R (2002)
- Wimbledon: 1R (2003, 2007)
- US Open: 1R (2004, 2007, 2008, 2009)

Team competitions
- Davis Cup: F (2002)

Paul-Henri Mathieu (French pronunciation: [pɔl ɑ̃ʁi matjø]; born 12 January 1982) is a French former professional tennis player. He won four singles titles on the ATP Tour. His best singles performance in an ATP World Tour Masters 1000 tournament was reaching the semifinals of the 2005 Canadian Open. He achieved a career-high ATP singles ranking of world No. 12 in April 2008.

== Tennis career ==
=== Formative years ===
Paul-Henri Mathieu was born in Strasbourg, France. He first began playing tennis when he was three and a half years old with his older brother Pierre-Yves. From 1997 to 2000, Paul-Henri trained at the IMG Bollettieri Tennis Academy in Bradenton, Florida before moving back to Paris.

=== Juniors ===
As a junior, Mathieu posted a singles record of 42–15 and a doubles record of 34–12, reaching as high as world no. 6 in singles and world no. 19 in doubles in January 2000. Mathieu won the boys' singles title at the 2000 French Open, defeating Tommy Robredo 3–6, 7–6^{(7–3)}, 6–2 in the final.

=== 2000–2004 ===
Mathieu made his ATP World Tour singles main draw debut in July 2000 in the Austrian town of Kitzbühel.

2002 was Mathieu's breakthrough year. He made the fourth round of the French Open, losing to Andre Agassi in five sets, despite having a two-set lead. Later on in the year, he confirmed his potential by winning back-to-back tournaments in Moscow and Lyon. He holds the distinction of being the last player to beat Pete Sampras before his retirement, which he did at the 2002 TD Waterhouse Cup. On 14 October, he became world no. 36, and his progress won him the ATP Newcomer of the Year award for 2002. He also nearly won the Davis Cup in 2002 with the French Davis Cup team, but lost the deciding rubber of the final to Mikhail Youzhny of Russia, once more after relinquishing a two-set advantage.

=== 2005 ===
In 2005, he achieved his best result in an ATP Masters Series event, knocking out Andy Roddick on his way to the semifinals at Montreal. He had a record of 2–2 in the four Davis Cup matches he played that year. He won both his matches against the Swedish opponents Thomas Johansson and Joachim Johansson, but lost to Russia's Nikolay Davydenko and Igor Andreev in the quarterfinal tie.

=== 2006 ===
2006 saw him equal his best result at a Grand Slam tournament by reaching the fourth round of the Australian Open. In May a career-high ranking of no. 32 was attained. In the third round of the French Open, he lost to eventual champion Rafael Nadal in a grueling encounter which lasted 4 hours and 53 minutes, but only saw 42 games played (Nadal won the match 5–7, 6–4, 6–4, 6–4, with the first set lasting 93 minutes and each of the following sets longer than an hour. The score was only 1–1 in the second set after just over 2 hours of play). Many tennis players and commentators, including two-time French Open runner-up Àlex Corretja, hailed it as a classic.

=== 2007 ===
2007 started poorly for Mathieu when he injured himself at the Australian Open during a 1st round encounter against Spaniard Fernando Verdasco and was forced to retire from the match. This was unfortunate as Mathieu was up 2 sets and 3–0 in the 3rd set tiebreak at the time. After returning from his injury, he reached the 4th round in Miami, beating then world number 5 Fernando González of Chile along the way, before bowing out to Andy Murray in 3 sets.

On 29 April 2007, Mathieu won his 3rd career title, the Grand Prix Hassan II in Casablanca defeating Álbert Montañés 6–1, 6–1. At Wimbledon, he reached round 4 for the first time, defeating Radek Štěpánek, No. 17 seed (15th-ranked) David Ferrer, and 15th seed (12th-ranked) Ivan Ljubičić. He attained a career high ranking of 28 in singles after this result, entering the world's top 30 for the first time. The week after Wimbledon, he beat Italian Andreas Seppi 6–7, 6–3, 7–5 in a difficult final to claim his fourth ATP Tour title in Gstaad, Switzerland. He rose to No. 23 in the rankings, making his top 25 breakthrough.

At the Montreal Masters, he produced one of the comebacks of the season to beat 15th seed Guillermo Cañas. Trailing 4–6, 0–4, he managed to up his level of play to win 13 of the next 14 games and record a win by the score of 4–6, 7–5, 6–0. He followed that up with a win over Mario Ančić in round 2. In round 3, he ran into Rafael Nadal, and actually won the first set 6–3 before losing the next two 6–3, 6–2.

He then made the semi-finals of New Haven losing to world number 6 James Blake in a 3rd set tiebreak. This result projected him in the world's top 20 for the 1st time, at the 20th rank.

=== 2012 ===
At the 2012 French Open, Mathieu won his first round match from two sets down before defeating John Isner in five sets, 18–16 in the decider in what proved to be the second longest match in French Open history and fourth longest in Grand Slam history. He lost in the third round to the Spaniard Marcel Granollers. Mathieu defeated Igor Andreev of Russia in the Swiss Open [6–3, 7–6^{(4)}].

=== 2015 ===
At the 2015 Generali Open Kitzbühel, Mathieu reached the final as a qualifier, after wins over Kenny de Schepper, Martin Kližan, Federico Delbonis and Nicolás Almagro. He lost in the final to Philipp Kohlschreiber 2–6, 6–2, 6–2.

=== 2017 ===
Mathieu played the last singles and doubles match of his career in an ATP World Tour Masters 1000 tournament – the 2017 Rolex Paris Masters. Rank world no. 265 in the ATP singles rankings coming into the tournament, he lost in the second and final singles qualifying round to Vasek Pospisil; he and his partner Benoît Paire lost in the doubles main draw first round to the American pair of Nicholas Monroe and Jack Sock.

== Personal life ==
Paul-Henri Mathieu's father (Patrick) and mother (Yveline) are a dentist and a housewife respectively. Paul-Henri has a sister named Aude and a brother named Pierre-Yves. A relatively popular, well-liked player despite his inconsistent career results, Mathieu is nicknamed "Paulo" and often affectionately known by his initials, PHM. His favourite surfaces are clay and hard, and he admired Boris Becker while growing up. His brother Pierre-Yves is now a tennis coach in Strasbourg.

On 11 March 2012, Paul-Henri Mathieu became a father for the first time when his girlfriend, Quiterie Camus, gave birth to the couple's first child, a son named Gabriel. On 10 September 2016, Mathieu and Camus married in Bourron-Marlotte's town hall. It was the mother of Camus, being the deputy mayor of Bourron-Marlotte, who performed the wedding ceremony. Mathieu and Quiterie Camus had been living together as a couple for nearly 13 years before their marriage. Quiterie Camus was diagnosed with Hodgkin's lymphoma in January 2013 and she recovered from it before their marriage. Their second child, a daughter named Inès, was born on 6 March 2017.

== ATP Tour career finals ==
=== Singles: 10 (4 titles, 6 runners-up) ===
Legend Grand Slam Tournaments (0–0) ATP World Tour Finals (0–0) ATP World Tour Masters 1000 (0–0) ATP World Tour 500 Series (0–1) ATP World Tour 250 Series (4–5)	Finals by surface Hard (0–3) Clay (2–3) Grass (0–0) Carpet (2–0)

Outcome	No.	Date	Tournament	Surface	Opponent	Score
Winner	1.	Oct 2002	Kremlin Cup, Moscow, Russia	Carpet (i)	(Netherlands) Sjeng Schalken	4–6, 6–2, 6–0
Winner	2.	Oct 2002	Open Sud de France, Lyon, France	Carpet (i)	(Brazil) Gustavo Kuerten	4–6, 6–3, 6–1
Runner-up	1.	Sep 2003	Campionati Internazionali di Sicilia, Palermo, Italy	Clay	(Chile) Nicolás Massú	6–1, 2–6, 6–7^{(0–7)}
Winner	3.	Apr 2007	Grand Prix Hassan II, Casablanca, Morocco	Clay	(Spain) Álbert Montañés	6–1, 6–1
Winner	4.	Jul 2007	Swiss Open, Gstaad, Switzerland	Clay	(Italy) Andreas Seppi	6–7^{(1–7)}, 6–4, 7–5
Runner-up	2.	Oct 2007	Kremlin Cup, Moscow, Russia	Hard (i)	(Russia) Nikolay Davydenko	5–7, 6–7^{(9–11)}
Runner-up	3.	Oct 2008	Moselle Open, Metz, France	Hard (i)	(Russia) Dmitry Tursunov	6–7^{(6–8)}, 6–1, 4–6
Runner-up	4.	Jul 2009	International German Open, Hamburg, Germany	Clay	(Russia) Nikolay Davydenko	4–6, 2–6
Runner-up	5.	Aug 2015	Austrian Open Kitzbühel, Kitzbühel, Austria	Clay	(Germany) Philipp Kohlschreiber	6–2, 2–6, 2–6
Runner-up	6.	Feb 2016	Open Sud de France, Montpellier, France	Hard (i)	(France) Richard Gasquet	5–7, 4–6

=== Doubles: 2 (1–1) ===
Legend Grand Slam Tournaments (0–0) ATP World Tour Finals (0–0) ATP World Tour Masters 1000 (0–0) ATP World Tour 500 Series (0–1) ATP World Tour 250 Series (1–0)	Finals by surface Hard (0–0) Clay (1–0) Grass (0–0) Carpet (0–0)

Outcome	No.	Date	Tournament	Surface	Partner	Opponents	Score
Winner	1.	Sep 2008	Romanian Open, Bucharest, Romania	Clay	(France) Nicolas Devilder	(Poland) Mariusz Fyrstenberg (Poland) Marcin Matkowski	7–6^{(7–4)}, 6–7^{(9–11)}, [22–20]
Runner-up	1.	Jul 2010	International German Open, Hamburg, Germany	Clay	(France) Jérémy Chardy	(Spain) David Marrero (Spain) Marc López	3–6, 6–2, [8–10]

== ATP Challenger and ITF Futures finals ==
=== Singles: 14 (4–10) ===
Legend (singles) ATP Challenger Tour (1–9) ITF Futures Tour (3–1)	Finals by surface Hard (1–5) Clay (3–5) Grass (0–0) Carpet (0–0)

Result	W–L	Date	Tournament	Tier	Surface	Opponent	Score
Loss	0–1	Apr 2000	USA F7, Mobile	Futures	Hard	(Argentina) Damián Furmanski	4–5 ret.
Win	1–1	Feb 2001	France F4, Deauville	Futures	Clay	(France) Jean-Michel Pequery	6–3, 7–5
Win	2–1	May 2001	Italy F1, Tortoreto	Futures	Clay	(Italy) Massimo Dell'Acqua	7–5, 6–1
Win	3–1	May 2001	Italy F2, Valdengo	Futures	Clay	(France) Guillaume Marx	7–5, 6–3
Loss	3–2	Jul 2001	Scheviningen, Netherlands	Challenger	Clay	(Netherlands) Raemon Sluiter	3–6, 4–6
Loss	3–3	Aug 2001	Córdoba, Spain	Challenger	Hard	(Finland) Jarkko Nieminen	4–6, 6–2, 3–6
Loss	3–4	Mar 2002	Potosí, Mexico	Challenger	Clay	(Belgium) Dick Norman	6–2, 2–6, 4–6
Win	4–4	Aug 2004	Segovia, Spain	Challenger	Hard	(France) Nicolas Mahut	6–7^{(4–7)}, 6–4, 6–4
Loss	4–5	Sep 2012	Pétange, Luxembourg	Challenger	Hard	(Germany) Tobias Kamke	6–7^{(7–9)}, 4–6
Loss	4–6	Sep 2013	Pétange, Luxembourg	Challenger	Hard	(Germany) Tobias Kamke	6–1, 3–6, 5–7
Loss	4–7	Jul 2014	Braunschweig, Germany	Challenger	Clay	(Germany) Alexander Zverev	6–1, 1–6, 4–6
Loss	4–8	May 2015	Aix En Provence, France	Challenger	Clay	(Netherlands) Robin Haase	6–7^{(1–7)}, 2–6
Loss	4–9	Jul 2015	Braunschweig, Germany	Challenger	Clay	(Serbia) Filip Krajinović	2–6, 4–6
Loss	4–10	Mar 2016	Quimper, France	Challenger	Hard	(Russia) Andrey Rublev	7–6^{(8–6)}, 4–6, 4–6

== Junior Grand Slam finals ==
=== Singles: 1 (1 title) ===
Result	Year	Tournament	Surface	Opponent	Score
Win	2000	French Open	Clay	(Spain) Tommy Robredo	3–6, 7–6^{(7–2)}, 6–2

== Performance timelines ==
Key
W	F	SF	QF	#R	RR	Q#	DNQ	A	NH

(W) winner; (F) finalist; (SF) semifinalist; (QF) quarterfinalist; (#R) rounds 4, 3, 2, 1; (RR) round-robin stage; (Q#) qualification round; (DNQ) did not qualify; (A) absent; (NH) not held; (SR) strike rate (events won / competed); (W–L) win–loss record.

=== Singles ===
Tournament	1999	2000	2001	2002	2003	2004	2005	2006	2007	2008	2009	2010	2011	2012	2013	2014	2015	2016	2017	SR	W–L
Grand Slam tournaments
Australian Open	A	A	Q2	1R	A	A	1R	4R	1R	4R	2R	A	A	A	1R	Q2	1R	1R	1R	0 / 10	7–10
French Open	A	Q1	1R	4R	1R	A	3R	3R	3R	4R	3R	1R	A	3R	1R	1R	1R	2R	1R	0 / 15	17–15
Wimbledon	A	A	A	2R	1R	A	1R	1R	4R	3R	2R	4R	A	1R	2R	1R	Q3	1R	Q3	0 / 12	12–12
US Open	A	Q1	Q1	1R	1R	3R	1R	2R	1R	2R	1R	3R	A	2R	1R	2R	1R	2R	Q1	0 / 14	9–14
Win–loss	0–0	0–0	0–1	4–4	0–3	2–1	2–4	6–4	5–4	9–4	4–4	5–3	0–0	3–3	1–4	1–3	0–3	2–4	0–2	0 / 51	44–51
Olympic Games
Summer Olympics	NH	A	Not Held			A	Not Held			QF	Not Held			A	Not Held			A	NH	0 / 1	3–1
ATP Masters 1000
Indian Wells Masters	A	A	Q1	A	A	A	4R	3R	3R	3R	3R	2R	A	A	1R	2R	Q1	A	A	0 / 8	11–8
Miami Masters	A	Q1	A	Q1	1R	A	2R	1R	4R	4R	3R	1R	A	A	A	1R	Q1	1R	A	0 / 9	7–9
Monte-Carlo Masters	A	Q2	Q2	A	1R	A	1R	2R	1R	1R	1R	1R	A	2R	A	1R	Q2	A	Q1	0 / 9	2–9
Rome Masters	A	A	A	A	1R	A	1R	2R	A	1R	2R	1R	A	A	A	A	A	Q1	A	0 / 6	2–6
Madrid Masters	Not Held			A	A	A	1R	A	3R	1R	1R	1R	A	A	Q2	2R	A	A	A	0 / 6	2–6
Canada Masters	A	A	A	A	2R	A	SF	1R	3R	1R	2R	2R	A	Q2	A	A	A	A	A	0 / 7	8–7
Cincinnati Masters	A	Q1	A	A	2R	A	2R	1R	1R	1R	3R	2R	A	1R	A	Q2	A	Q1	A	0 / 8	5–8
Shanghai Masters	Not Masters Series										1R	Q1	A	A	A	A	A	A	A	0 / 1	0–1
Paris Masters	A	Q2	Q1	A	1R	1R	3R	3R	1R	1R	1R	A	A	2R	A	A	Q2	1R	Q2	0 / 9	5–9
Hamburg Masters	A	A	A	A	1R	A	1R	3R	2R	1R	Not Masters 1000									0 / 5	3–5
Career statistics
Titles / Finals	0 / 0	0 / 0	0 / 0	2 / 2	0 / 1	0 / 0	0 / 0	0 / 0	2 / 3	0 / 1	0 / 1	0 / 0	0 / 0	0 / 0	0 / 0	0 / 0	0 / 1	0 / 1	0 / 0	4 / 10	
Overall win–loss	0–0	2–3	0–2	23–16	16–23	10–11	28–29	23–28	46–24	32–28	28–29	11–20	0–0	14–17	6–19	11–17	7–12	18–19	1–9	276–306	
Year-end ranking	517	272	147	36	83	121	47	55	25	32	33	97	NR	59	129	97	95	73	249		

=== Doubles ===
Tournament	2001	2002	2003	2004	2005	2006	2007	2008	2009	2010	2011	2012	2013	2014	2015	2016	2017	SR	W–L
Grand Slam tournaments
Australian Open	A	A	A	A	1R	A	A	A	1R	A	A	A	A	A	A	A	1R	0 / 3	0–3
French Open	1R	2R	1R	A	1R	1R	A	A	A	A	A	A	1R	1R	A	1R	1R	0 / 9	1–9
Wimbledon	A	A	1R	A	A	A	1R	A	A	A	A	A	A	A	A	1R	A	0 / 3	0–3
US Open	A	A	A	1R	A	A	1R	1R	1R	A	A	A	A	A	A	1R	A	0 / 5	0–5
Win–loss	0–1	1–1	0–2	0–1	0–2	0–1	0–2	0–1	0–2	0–0	0–0	0–0	0–1	0–1	0–0	0–3	0–2	0 / 20	1–20

== ATP career earnings ==
Year	Grand Slam singles titles	ATP singles titles	Total singles titles	Earnings ($)	Rank
1999	0	0	0	$3,711
2000	0	0	0	$30,669
2001	0	0	0	$64,452
2002	0	2	2	$406,768	50
2003	0	0	0	$280,417	77
2004	0	0	0	$142,400	147
2005	0	0	0	$438,455	56
2006	0	0	0	$423,072	59
2007	0	2	2	$699,770	24
2008	0	0	0	$672,772	39
2009	0	0	0	$646,722	41
2010	0	0	0	$392,899	73
2011	0	0	0	$0
2012	0	0	0	$378,879	82
2013	0	0	0	$340,564	102
2014	0	0	0	$360,867	105
2015	0	6	6	$292,030	121
2016	0	0	0	$521,761	82
2017	0	0	0	$202,806	177
Career	0	4	4	$6,299,093	146

== Wins against top-10 players ==
Season	2000	2001	2002	2003	2004	2005	2006	2007	2008	2009	2010	2011	2012	2013	2014	2015	2016	2017	Total
Wins	0	0	2	1	1	1	0	4	1	0	0	0	0	0	0	0	0	0	10

#	Player	Rank	Event	Surface	Rd	Score
2002
1.	(Spain) Albert Costa	7	Gstaad, Switzerland	Clay	1R	6–4, 6–3
2.	(Russia) Marat Safin	4	Moscow, Russia	Carpet (i)	SF	7–6^{(7–3)}, 6–4
2003
3.	(Germany) Rainer Schüttler	8	Kitzbühel, Austria	Clay	2R	6–4, 3–6, 6–3
2004
4.	(Spain) Carlos Moyá	6	Davis Cup, Alicante, Spain	Clay	RR	6–3, 3–6, 2–6, 6–3, 6–3
2005
5.	(United States) Andy Roddick	5	Montreal, Canada	Hard	1R	7–5, 6–3
2007
6.	(Russia) Nikolay Davydenko	3	Sydney, Australia	Hard	2R	6–4, ret.
7.	(Chile) Fernando González	5	Miami, United States	Hard	3R	6–3, 7–6^{(8–6)}
8.	(Russia) Nikolay Davydenko	4	Davis Cup, Moscow, Russia	Clay (i)	RR	2–6, 6–2, 6–1, 7–5
9.	(Chile) Fernando González	6	Estoril, Portugal	Clay	1R	6–2, 6–4
2008
10.	(Russia) Nikolay Davydenko	5	Summer Olympics, Beijing, China	Hard	2R	7–5, 6–3

Preceded by Andy Roddick	ATP Newcomer of the Year; 2002	Succeeded by Rafael Nadal
