= 1884 United States presidential election in Pennsylvania =

- November 4, 1884
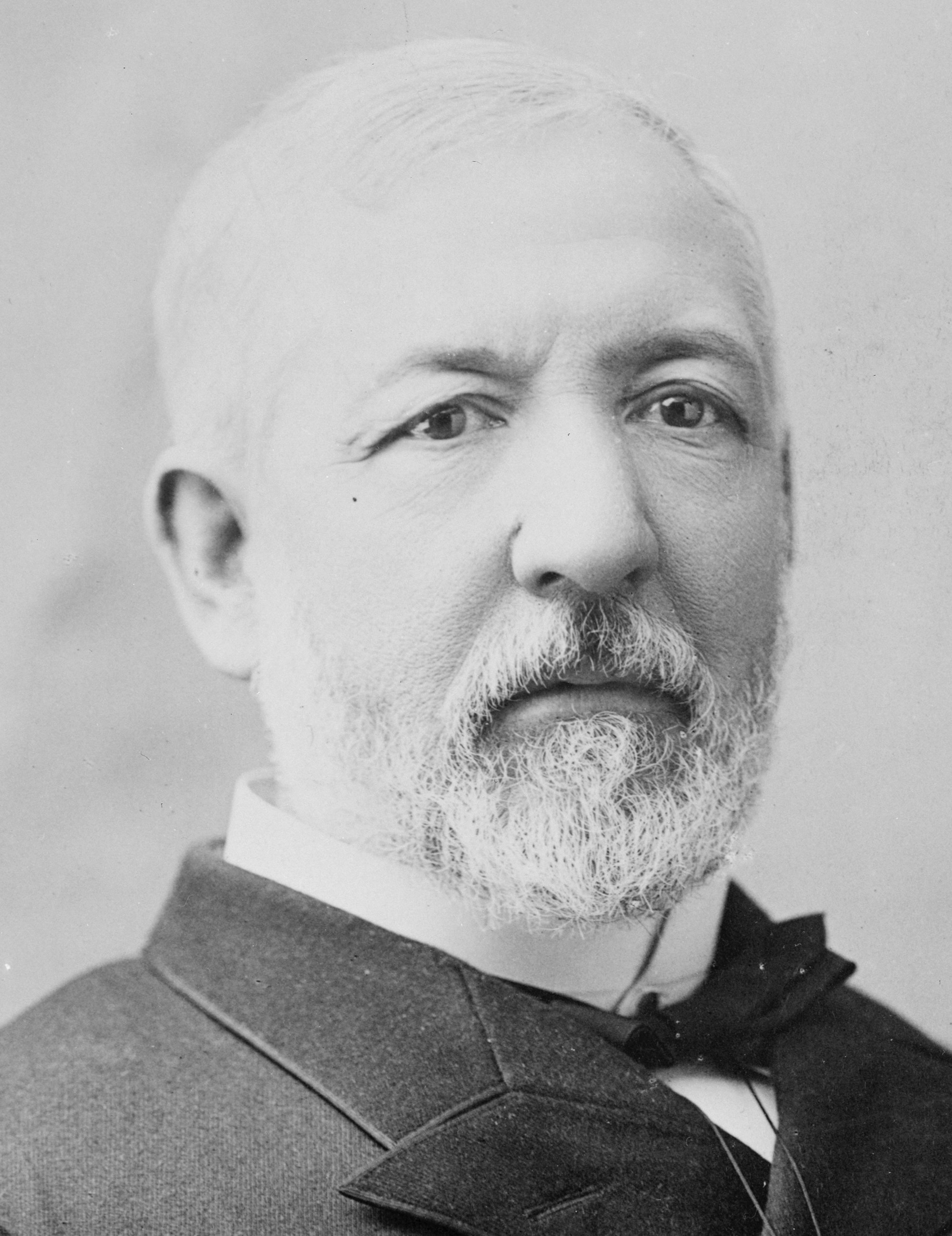

Nominee	James G. Blaine	Grover Cleveland
Party	Republican	Democratic
Home state	Maine	New York
Running mate	John A. Logan	Thomas A. Hendricks
Electoral vote	30	0
Popular vote	478,804	392,785
Percentage	52.97%	43.46%
County results
Blaine
40–50%
50–60%
60–70%
Cleveland
40–50%
50–60%
60–70%
70–80%
President before election
Chester A. Arthur
Republican
Elected President
Grover Cleveland
Democratic

A presidential election was held in Pennsylvania on November 4, 1884, as part of the 1884 United States presidential election. Voters chose thirty representatives, known as electors, to the Electoral College, who voted for president and vice president.

Pennsylvania voted for the Republican nominee, James G. Blaine, over the Democratic nominee, Grover Cleveland. Blaine won Pennsylvania by a margin of 9.51%.

This election was the first since 1824 that the national winner of the election did not carry Pennsylvania, and the first time since 1796 that Pennsylvania voted for a candidate who lost both the electoral and national popular vote. (In 1824, Pennsylvania cast its vote for Andrew Jackson, who won the popular vote but lost in the contingent house election.) This was also the first time that a Democrat won without carrying the state.

== Results ==
1884 United States presidential election in Pennsylvania
Party	Candidate	Votes	Percentage	Electoral votes
Republican	James G. Blaine	478,804	52.97%	30
Democratic	Grover Cleveland	392,785	43.46%	0
Greenback Labor	Benjamin Butler	16,992	1.88%	0
Prohibition	John St. John	15,283	1.69%	0
Totals		903,864	100.0%	30

=== Results by county ===
County	James G. Blaine Republican		Grover Cleveland Democratic		Various candidates Other parties		Margin		Total votes cast
County	#	%	#	%	#	%	#	%	Total votes cast
Adams	3,080	46.15%	3,530	52.89%	64	0.96%	-450	-6.74%	6,674
Allegheny	37,865	61.96%	19,469	31.86%	3,774	6.18%	18,396	30.10%	61,108
Armstrong	4,685	53.81%	3,591	41.24%	431	4.95%	1,094	12.56%	8,707
Beaver	5,075	56.51%	3,546	39.48%	360	4.01%	1,529	17.02%	8,981
Bedford	3,985	50.62%	3,815	48.46%	73	0.93%	170	2.16%	7,873
Berks	9,587	36.46%	16,484	62.68%	226	0.86%	-6,897	-26.23%	26,297
Blair	6,396	55.96%	4,649	40.67%	385	3.37%	1,747	15.28%	11,430
Bradford	8,405	62.51%	4,216	31.36%	825	6.14%	4,189	31.15%	13,446
Bucks	8,191	48.47%	8,604	50.92%	103	0.61%	-413	-2.44%	16,898
Butler	5,217	52.43%	4,236	42.57%	497	4.99%	981	9.86%	9,950
Cambria	4,253	44.45%	4,816	50.34%	498	5.21%	-563	-5.88%	9,567
Cameron	757	55.91%	590	43.57%	7	0.52%	167	12.33%	1,354
Carbon	3,250	47.69%	3,392	49.77%	173	2.54%	-142	-2.08%	6,815
Centre	4,057	46.66%	4,495	51.70%	143	1.64%	-438	-5.04%	8,695
Chester	10,885	58.59%	7,102	38.23%	592	3.19%	3,783	20.36%	18,579
Clarion	2,679	38.09%	3,822	54.34%	533	7.58%	-1,143	-16.25%	7,034
Clearfield	4,271	43.75%	5,169	52.94%	323	3.31%	-898	-9.20%	9,763
Clinton	2,625	41.32%	3,625	57.06%	103	1.62%	-1,000	-15.74%	6,353
Columbia	2,443	34.62%	4,338	61.48%	275	3.90%	-1,895	-26.86%	7,056
Crawford	7,233	49.20%	5,633	38.32%	1,834	12.48%	1,600	10.88%	14,700
Cumberland	4,659	45.74%	5,375	52.77%	151	1.48%	-716	-7.03%	10,185
Dauphin	9,394	58.46%	6,378	39.69%	298	1.85%	3,016	18.77%	16,070
Delaware	7,512	61.27%	4,538	37.01%	211	1.72%	2,974	24.26%	12,261
Elk	1,082	40.27%	1,447	53.85%	158	5.88%	-365	-13.58%	2,687
Erie	9,230	54.77%	6,725	39.91%	896	5.32%	2,505	14.87%	16,851
Fayette	5,955	45.39%	6,734	51.32%	432	3.29%	-779	-5.94%	13,121
Forest	705	48.72%	437	30.20%	305	21.08%	268	18.52%	1,447
Franklin	5,570	50.82%	5,261	48.00%	130	1.19%	309	2.82%	10,961
Fulton	928	42.24%	1,256	57.17%	13	0.59%	-328	-14.93%	2,197
Greene	2,260	34.64%	4,240	64.99%	24	0.37%	-1,980	-30.35%	6,524
Huntingdon	3,913	54.39%	2,908	40.42%	373	5.18%	1,005	13.97%	7,194
Indiana	4,607	56.48%	1,979	24.26%	1,571	19.26%	2,628	32.22%	8,157
Jefferson	3,418	51.48%	2,978	44.86%	243	3.66%	440	6.63%	6,639
Juniata	1,741	47.04%	1,900	51.34%	60	1.62%	-159	-4.30%	3,701
Lackawanna	9,656	58.47%	6,171	37.37%	687	4.16%	3,485	21.10%	16,514
Lancaster	19,848	65.85%	9,953	33.02%	340	1.13%	9,895	32.83%	30,141
Lawrence	4,322	62.49%	2,148	31.06%	446	6.45%	2,174	31.43%	6,916
Lebanon	5,207	63.45%	2,977	36.28%	22	0.27%	2,230	27.18%	8,206
Lehigh	6,357	43.72%	8,095	55.67%	88	0.61%	-1,738	-11.95%	14,540
Luzerne	12,859	47.18%	13,806	50.65%	592	2.17%	-947	-3.47%	27,257
Lycoming	5,355	45.25%	5,900	49.86%	579	4.89%	-545	-4.61%	11,834
McKean	3,820	49.95%	2,980	38.97%	847	11.08%	840	10.98%	7,647
Mercer	6,357	51.81%	4,861	39.62%	1,052	8.57%	1,496	12.19%	12,270
Mifflin	2,082	49.18%	2,085	49.26%	66	1.56%	-3	-0.07%	4,233
Monroe	1,009	23.59%	3,242	75.78%	27	0.63%	-2,233	-52.20%	4,278
Montgomery	11,617	50.54%	11,088	48.24%	281	1.22%	529	2.30%	22,986
Montour	1,165	38.26%	1,755	57.64%	125	4.11%	-590	-19.38%	3,045
Northampton	6,327	39.44%	9,491	59.16%	224	1.40%	-3,164	-19.72%	16,042
Northumberland	5,718	47.92%	5,835	48.90%	380	3.18%	-117	-0.98%	11,933
Perry	3,106	51.33%	2,883	47.65%	62	1.02%	223	3.69%	6,051
Philadelphia	101,288	58.00%	71,288	40.82%	2,057	1.18%	30,000	17.18%	174,633
Pike	512	30.60%	1,141	68.20%	20	1.20%	-629	-37.60%	1,673
Potter	1,990	54.72%	1,363	37.48%	284	7.81%	627	17.24%	3,637
Schuylkill	11,272	46.87%	11,200	46.58%	1,575	6.55%	72	0.30%	24,047
Snyder	2,186	59.31%	1,460	39.61%	40	1.09%	726	19.70%	3,686
Somerset	4,792	64.84%	2,449	33.13%	150	2.03%	2,343	31.70%	7,391
Sullivan	679	35.35%	1,062	55.28%	180	9.37%	-383	-19.94%	1,921
Susquehanna	4,717	53.58%	3,394	38.55%	693	7.87%	1,323	15.03%	8,804
Tioga	6,714	65.12%	2,681	26.00%	915	8.87%	4,033	39.12%	10,310
Union	2,209	60.19%	1,395	38.01%	66	1.80%	814	22.18%	3,670
Venango	3,961	46.50%	3,432	40.29%	1,125	13.21%	529	6.21%	8,518
Warren	3,948	52.44%	2,691	35.75%	889	11.81%	1,257	16.70%	7,528
Washington	6,699	50.21%	5,849	43.84%	793	5.94%	850	6.37%	13,341
Wayne	2,829	46.82%	2,894	47.90%	319	5.28%	-65	-1.08%	6,042
Westmoreland	8,339	47.52%	8,346	47.56%	864	4.92%	-7	-0.04%	17,549
Wyoming	1,960	47.47%	2,027	49.09%	142	3.44%	-67	-1.62%	4,129
York	8,014	40.68%	11,552	58.65%	132	0.67%	-3,538	-17.96%	19,698
Totals	472,827	52.55%	394,772	43.88%	32,146	3.57%	78,055	8.68%	899,745

== See also ==
- United States presidential elections in Pennsylvania
