= William Eckhardt =

William Eckhardt may refer to:

- William Eckhardt (lawyer), lawyer and professor of law
- William Eckhardt (trader) (born 1955), commodities and futures trader and fund manager
