= Woensel =

Borough of Eindhoven, Netherlands

Coordinates: 51°29′N 5°28′E

Woensel is a former town in the Dutch province of North Brabant, but nowadays a borough of Eindhoven.

An important rural village in North Brabant, Woensel is mentioned in a document from 1107; it was the seat of a deanage of the diocese of Liège. According to the German mythologist Jacob Grimm the name Woensel is a reference to the Germanic god Wodan (Odin in Norse mythology). The suffix would have been an abbreviation of either -sala ("hall") or -loo ("forest").

Around 1200, Eindhoven, a fortification on the Dommel river to the south of Woensel, grew into a local market town that took more political prominence, but never surpassed Woensel in prosperity or population.

Woensel was a separate municipality until the fusion, in 1920, of Eindhoven proper (i.e. within the town walls) and its surrounding villages into a single municipality. Today, Woensel is Eindhoven's largest district, with about 110,000 inhabitants; it is mostly covered by urban neighbourhoods erected between 1950 and 1990.

Woensel offers very few places of more than local interest, being almost entirely a residential area; Eindhoven's main entertainment venues and industry are in other parts of town. Until 1998, the international head office of Philips was located in Woensel. Currently, this building is the seat of the Dutch organisation of Philips.

Known to at least Eindhoven's inhabitants are

- de Woenselse markt, the heart of old Woensel town in classical triangular shape, which hosts Eindhoven's main market every Saturday;
- Winkelcentrum Woensel, a large shopping center at the heart of the Woensel area. It was renamed WoensXL in 2006, but Winkelcentrum Woensel is still in use.
- Eindhoven's two hospitals (Catharina- and Maxima Hospital))
- Eckart castle

There is also a World War II cemetery of the Commonwealth of Nations.
