= Eckert Presbyterian Church =

Historic church in Colorado, United States

- First Presbyterian Church of Eckert
- U.S. National Register of Historic Places
- Colorado State Register of Historic Properties
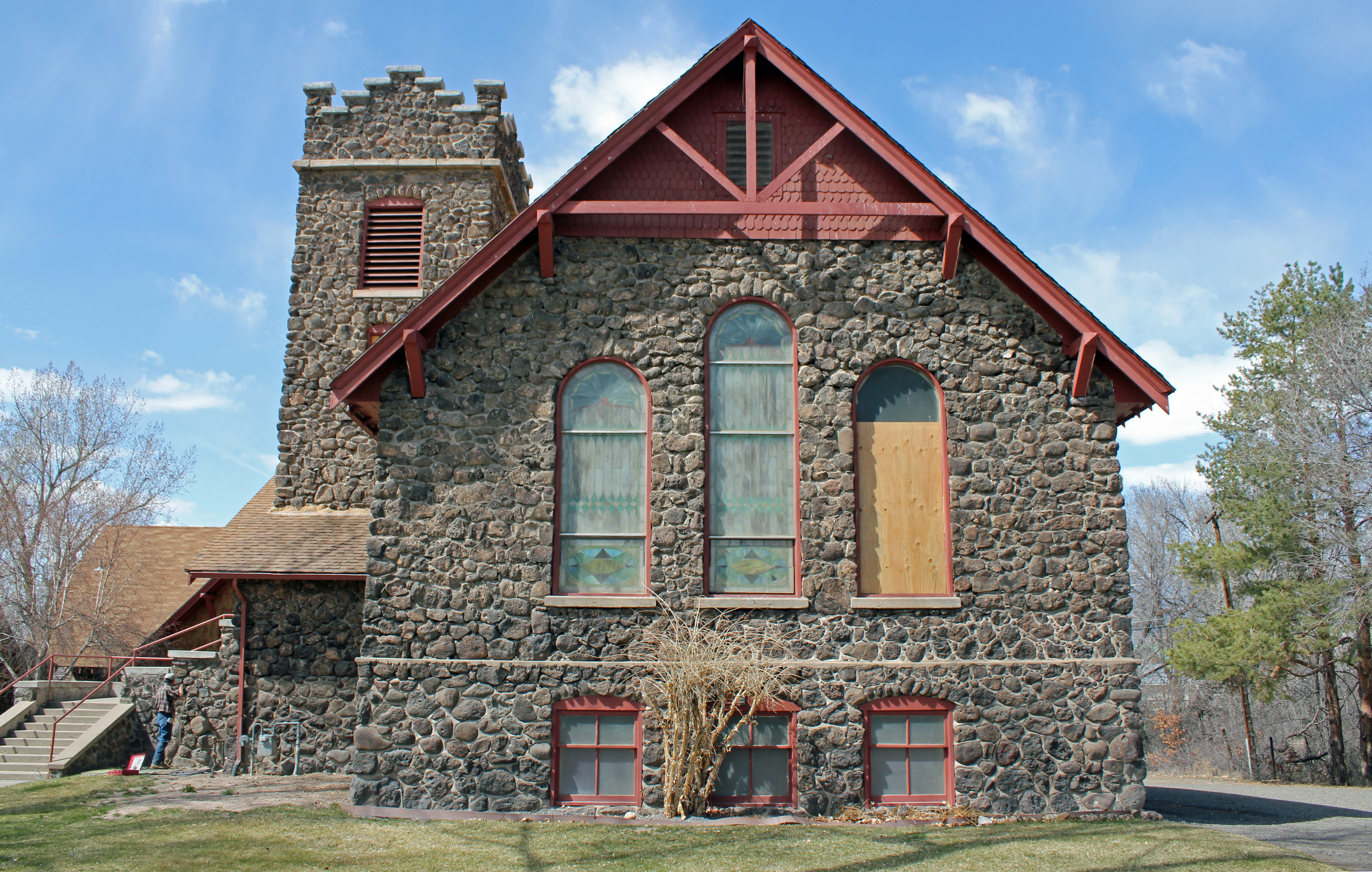
- The church in 2013

- Location within Colorado Location within the United States
- Location: 13025 CO 65, Eckert, Colorado
- Coordinates: 38°49′42″N 107°58′14″W
- Area: less than one acre
- Built: 1921
- Architect: Lawrence B. & Arthur L. Valk, S. Joseph Hunt
- Architectural style: Bungalow/Craftsman, Rustic
- NRHP reference No.: 05001507
- CSRHP No.: 5DT.1379
- Added to NRHP: January 11, 2006

Eckert Presbyterian Church previously known as First Presbyterian Church of Eckert is an historic church in Eckert, Colorado.

== History ==
Residents of the area met at the local high school, February 24, 1913, and voted to establish the First Presbyterian Church of Eckert. After fundraising and the donation of plot of land, the congregation engaged architect Lawrence B. Valk of Los Angeles and construction began in 1915. Work slowed in 1918 and 1919 due to shortages of labor and supplies caused by World War I and a flu epidemic that gripped the area, but the lower level was completed in June 1919. Construction of the upper level lagged but was complete in June 1921.

The first pastor, Rev. James Hunsicker, also served as principal of the area high school. For that reason and the lack of other available spaces, members of the community often utilized the church spaces for school plays, basketball games and other large events. In 1961, the congregation voted to change its name from First Presbyterian Church of Eckert to the current Eckert Presbyterian Church.

The building was added to the National Register in 2006.

== Architecture ==
Valk designed the structure in a Bungalow/Craftsman and Rustic style that was popular in the early twentieth century. The structure is 35 ft × 72 ft (11 m × 22 m) and constructed of local field stone with timber accents. It sits on a sloped site with the sanctuary on the main level above a basement. A gabled vestibule dominates the center of the south façade and houses the primary entry. The tower rises from the roof of the vestibule and is capped with a stepped parapet. Three large stained glass windows with arched tops dominate the east wall of the sanctuary which features a post and beam ceiling. When constructed, the main level contained a movable partition allowing the space to accommodate worship services and Sunday school.

In an effort to conserve scarce funds, the congregation eliminated central heating from the construction plans and intended to heat the entire structure with wood stoves. They installed two on the main level and one in the basement, but this arrangement soon proved impractical and by 1925, they began to raise additional funds for a furnace.

In 1946, the congregation decided to construct a manse for the pastor. The manse was situated south of the sanctuary and constructed in a rustic style to blend with the sanctuary. In 1987, the congregation constructed a new facility to house offices, activity space and classrooms. The facility is two-floors and occupies a plot 25 ft × 69 ft (7.6 m × 21.0 m) between the sanctuary and manse forming a courtyard on the east. Because of the slope of the site, the facility appears to be only one story. As part of the addition, the partition was removed from the sanctuary and new pews and carpeting were installed.
