= Ekeler =

Ekeler is a surname. Notable people with the surname include:

- Austin Ekeler (born 1995), American football player
- Mike Ekeler (born 1971), American football coach
- Wyett Ekeler (born 2001), American football player

== See also ==
- Eckler, surname
