= Raman laser =

Type of laser

A Raman laser is a specific type of laser in which the fundamental light-amplification mechanism is stimulated Raman scattering. In contrast, most "conventional" lasers (such as the ruby laser) rely on stimulated electronic transitions to amplify light.

== Specific properties of Raman lasers ==
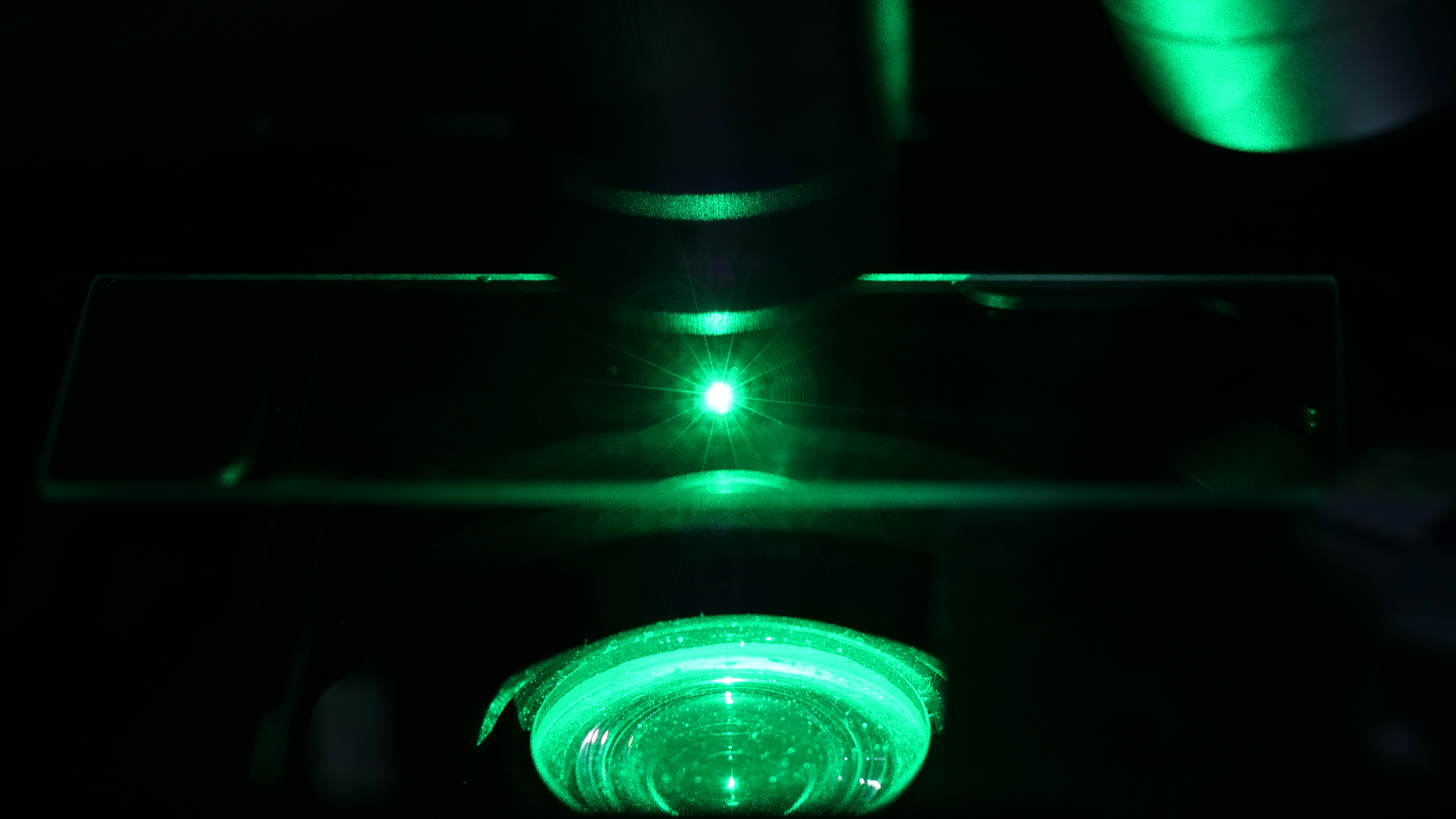
Raman measurement of ionic liquid droplet

=== Spectral flexibility ===
Raman lasers are optically pumped. However, this pumping does not produce a population inversion as in conventional lasers. Rather, pump photons are absorbed and "immediately" re-emitted as lower-frequency laser-light photons ("Stokes" photons) by stimulated Raman scattering. The difference between the two photon energies is fixed and corresponds to a vibrational frequency of the gain medium. This makes it possible, in principle, to produce arbitrary laser-output wavelengths by choosing the pump-laser wavelength appropriately. This is in contrast to conventional lasers, in which the possible laser output wavelengths are determined by the emission lines of the gain material.

In optical fibers made of silica, for example, the frequency shift corresponding to the largest Raman gain is about 13.2 THz. In the near infrared, this corresponds to a wavelength separation between pump light and laser-output light of about 100 nm.

== Types of Raman lasers ==
The first Raman laser, realized in 1962, by Gisela Eckhardt and E.J. Woodbury used nitrobenzene as the gain medium, which was intra-cavity-pumped inside a Q-switching ruby laser. Various other gain media can be used to construct Raman lasers:

=== Raman fiber lasers ===
The first continuous-wave Raman laser using an optical fiber as the gain medium was demonstrated in 1976. In fiber-based lasers, tight spatial confinement of the pump light is maintained over relatively large distances. This significantly lowers threshold pump powers down to practical levels and furthermore enables continuous-wave operation.

In 1988, the first Raman fiber laser based on fiber Bragg gratings has been made. Fiber Bragg gratings are narrow-band reflectors and act as the mirrors of the laser cavity. They are inscribed directly into the core of the optical fiber used as the gain medium, which eliminates substantial losses that previously arose due to the coupling of the fiber to external bulk-optic cavity reflectors.

Nowadays, commercially available fiber-based Raman lasers can deliver output powers in the range of a few tens of Watts in continuous-wave operation. A technique that is commonly employed in these devices is cascading, first proposed in 1994: The "first-order" laser light that is generated from the pump light in a single frequency-shifting step remains trapped in the laser resonator and is pushed to such high power levels that it acts itself as the pump for the generation of "second-order" laser light that is shifted by the same vibrational frequency again. In this way, a single laser resonator is used to convert the pump light (typically around 1060 nm) through several discrete steps to an "arbitrary" desired output wavelength.

=== Silicon Raman lasers ===
More recently, Raman lasing has been demonstrated in silicon-based integrated-optical waveguides by Bahram Jalali's group at the University of California in Los Angeles in 2004 (pulsed operation) and by Intel in 2005 (continuous-wave), respectively. These developments received much attention because it was the first time that a laser was realized in silicon: "classical" lasing based on electronic transitions is prohibited in crystalline silicon due to its indirect bandgap. Practical silicon-based light sources would be very interesting for the field of silicon photonics, which seeks to exploit silicon not only for realizing electronics but also for novel light-processing functionality on the same chip.

== See also ==
- Raman amplification
- C. V. Raman
