= George Keiser =

American politician (1946–2021)

Member of the North Dakota House of Representatives from the 47th district
- In office 1992 – December 22, 2021
- Succeeded by: Robb Eckert

Personal details
- Born: February 22, 1946
- Died: December 22, 2021 (aged 75)
- Party: Republican
- Spouse: Kathy
- Profession: Farmer

George J. Keiser (February 22, 1946 – December 22, 2021) was an American politician in the state of North Dakota. He was a member of the North Dakota House of Representatives, representing the 47th district. A Republican, he was first elected in 1992. Keiser attended the University of Utah, where he earned a Ph.D., and later became a businessman. He also served in the United States Army. From 1988 to 1992, he served as Commissioner of the City of Bismarck.

In August 2019, Keiser was diagnosed with amyotrophic lateral sclerosis. He died from the disease on December 22, 2021, at the age of 75. Robb Eckert was appointed to complete Keiser's term representing the 47th district office in the North Dakota House of Representatives.
