= 1796 United States presidential election in Pennsylvania =

- November 4 – December 7, 1796
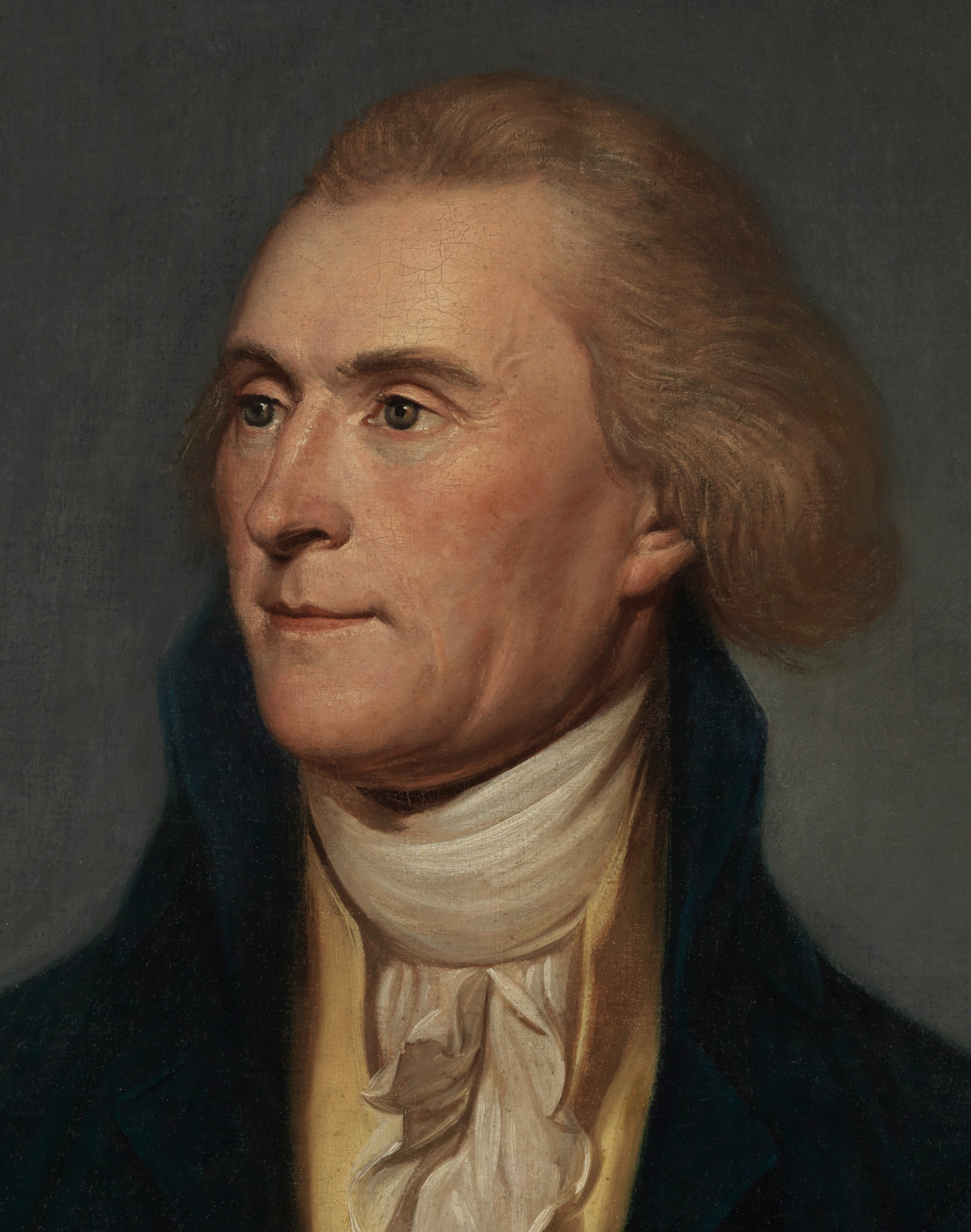

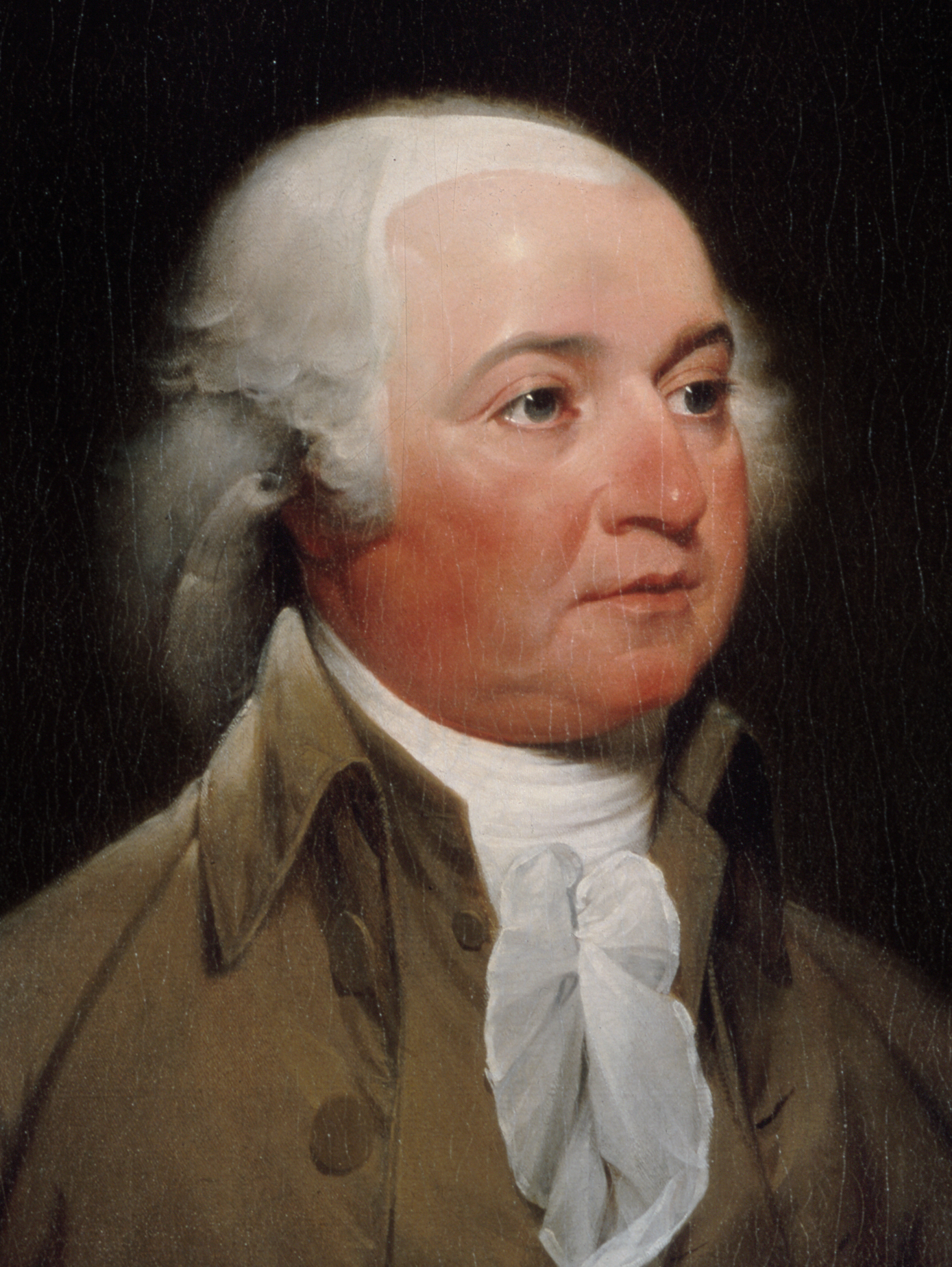

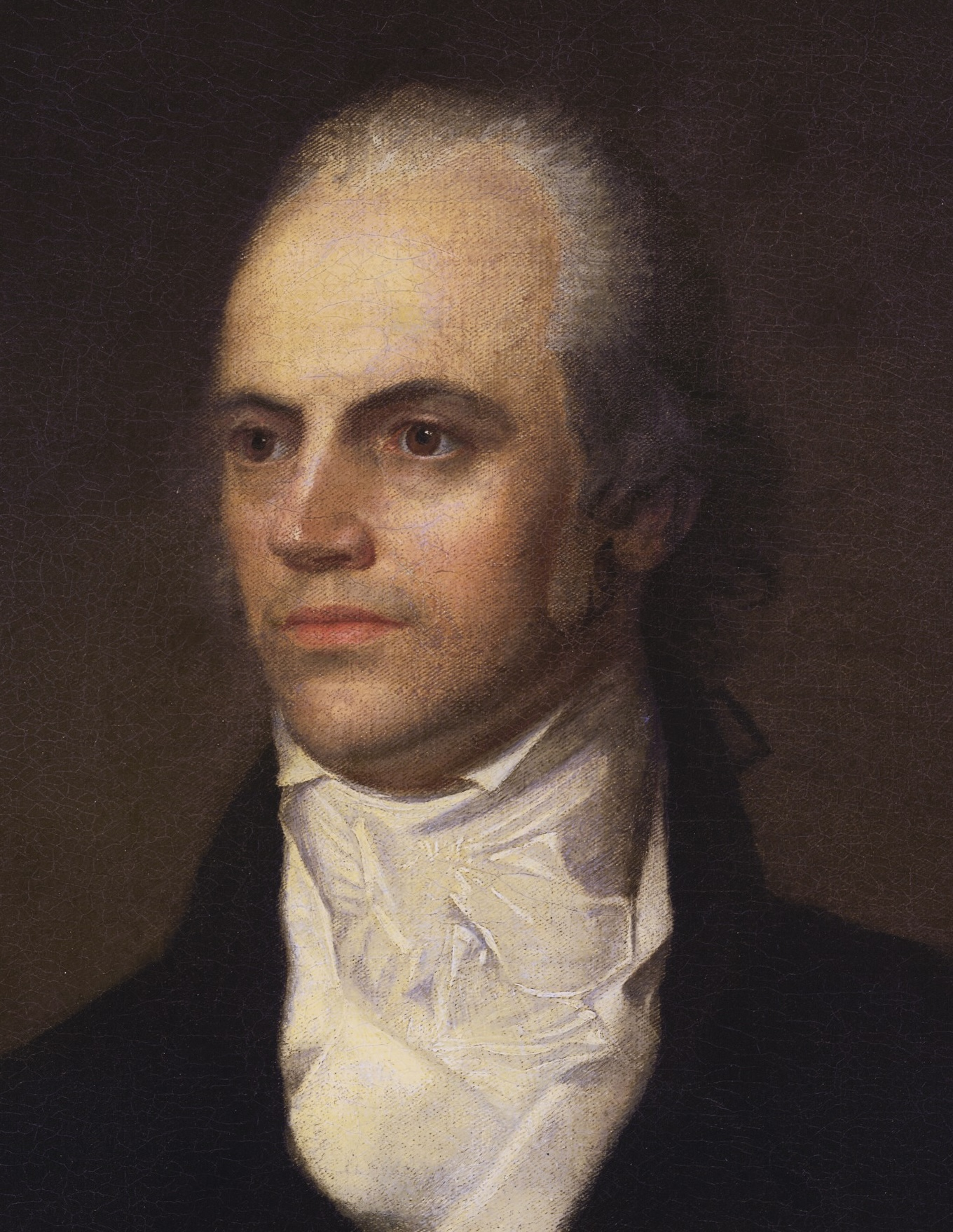

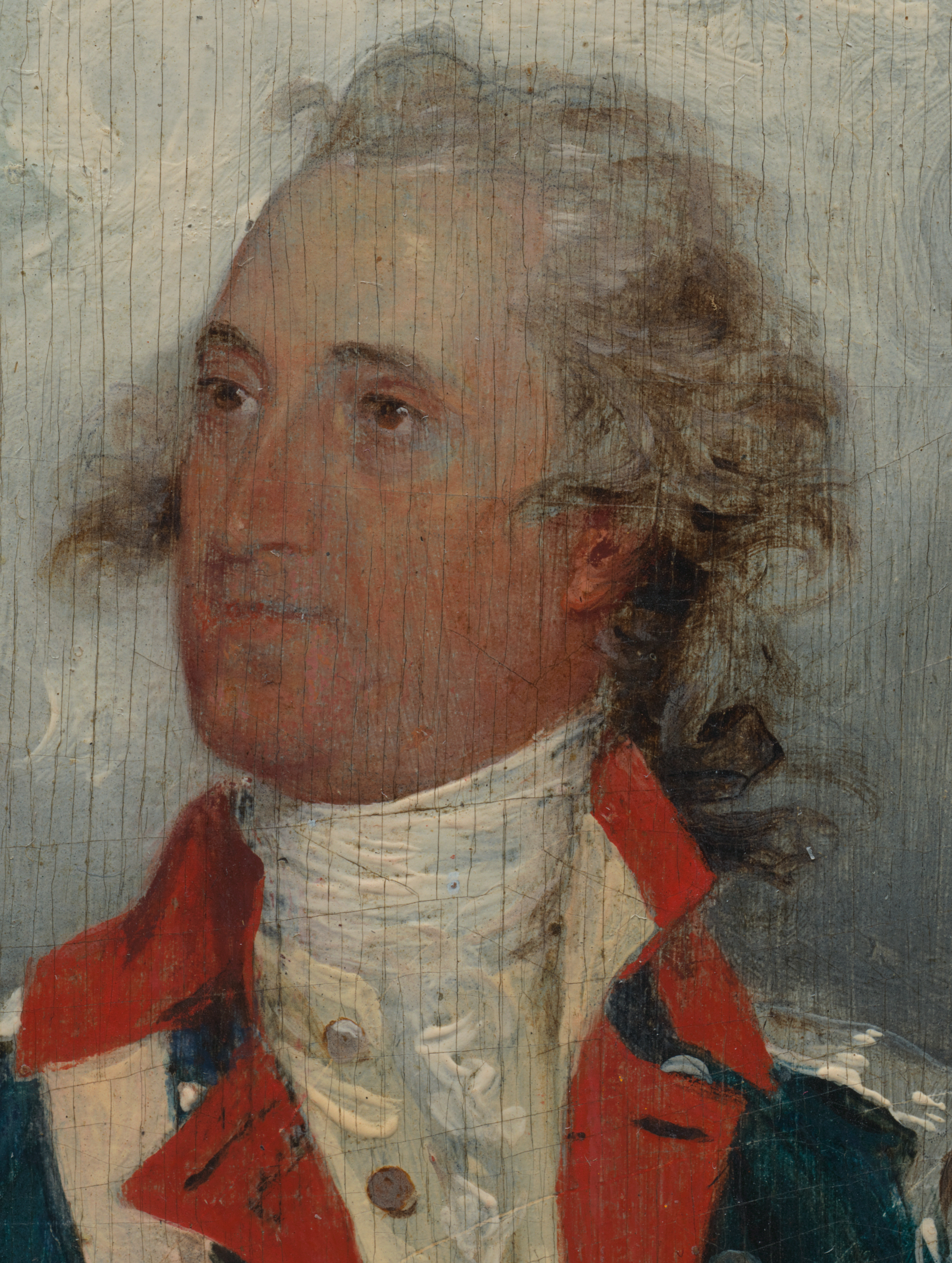
Nominee	Thomas Jefferson	John Adams
Party	Democratic-Republican	Federalist
Home state	Virginia	Massachusetts
Electoral vote	14	1
Popular vote	12,340	12,217
Percentage	50.25%	49.75%
Nominee	Aaron Burr	Thomas Pinckney
Party	Democratic-Republican	Federalist
Home state	New York	South Carolina
Electoral vote	13	2
County results
Adams
60–70%
70–80%
80–90%
90–100%
Jefferson
50–60%
70–80%
80–90%
90–100%
President before election
George Washington
Nonpartisan
Elected President
John Adams
Federalist

A presidential election was held in Pennsylvania in 1796, as part of the 1796 United States presidential election. Voters chose 15 representatives, or electors to the Electoral College, who voted for President and Vice President.

Pennsylvania voted for the Democratic-Republican candidate, Thomas Jefferson, over the Federalist candidate, John Adams. Jefferson won Pennsylvania by a margin of 0.36%. Greene County's returns, which favored Jefferson, were not submitted in time to be included in the official vote totals. (Note: Greene County's returns are included in the county results table.) As a result, the 2 highest vote-getting Adams electors received more votes than the 2 lowest vote-getting Jefferson electors and the electoral vote was split, with 14 of 15 electors casting their ballots for Jefferson. Because Greene county's results were not reported in time to be included in the official proclamation, it has been excluded from the result totals below. Greene county reported 210 votes for Jefferson, and 44 votes for Adams, all of which was rejected, and excluded from the official proclamation issued by Governor Thomas Mifflin.

== Results ==
1796 United States presidential election in Pennsylvania
Party	Candidate	Votes	%
Democratic-Republican	Thomas Jefferson	12,340	50.25%
Federalist	John Adams	12,217	49.75%
Total valid votes		24,557	100.00%
Democratic-Republican	Thomas Jefferson	12,550	50.58%
Federalist	John Adams	12,261	49.42%
Total votes		24,811	100.00%

=== Results by county ===
1796 United States presidential election in Pennsylvania
County	Thomas Jefferson Democratic-Republican		John Adams Federalist		Margin		Total (Note: Direct results for Thomas Jefferson and John Adams are taken from all electors with either a formal ticket pledge, or a submitted electoral vote, for each county.) (Note: Greene county results were not reported in time to be included in the Official Proclamation.)
County	#	%	#	%	#	%	Total
Allegheny	392	83.58%	77	16.42%	315	67.16%	469
Bedford	190	90.91%	19	9.09%	171	81.82%	209
Berks	722	55.62%	576	44.38%	146	11.24%	1,298
Bucks	358	26.34%	1,001	73.66%	-643	-47.32%	1,359
Chester	121	18.45%	535	81.55%	-414	-63.10%	656
Cumberland	857	78.26%	238	21.74%	619	56.52%	1,095
Dauphin	233	33.43%	464	66.57%	-231	-33.14%	697
Delaware	129	29.19%	313	70.81%	-184	-41.62%	442
Fayette	409	84.85%	73	15.15%	336	69.70%	482
Franklin	352	58.67%	248	41.33%	104	17.34%	600
Greene	210	82.68%	44	17.32%	166	65.36%	254
Huntingdon	22	6.57%	313	93.43%	-291	-86.86%	335
Lancaster	619	23.10%	2,061	76.90%	-1,442	-53.80%	2,680
Luzerne	8	1.93%	407	98.07%	-399	-96.14%	415
Mifflin	467	95.31%	23	4.69%	444	90.62%	490
Montgomery	333	38.45%	533	61.55%	-200	-23.10%	866
Northampton	460	55.42%	370	44.58%	90	10.84%	830
Northumberland & Lycoming	802	96.16%	32	3.84%	770	92.32%	834
Philadelphia	1,833	82.12%	399	17.88%	1,434	64.24%	2,232
Philadelphia City	1,735	61.39%	1,091	38.61%	644	22.78%	2,826
Somerset	26	35.14%	48	64.86%	-22	-29.72%	74
Washington	1,259	98.36%	21	1.64%	1,238	96.72%	1,280
Westmoreland	872	94.37%	52	5.63%	820	88.74%	924
York	141	4.19%	3,224	95.81%	-3,083	-91.62%	3,365
Total	12,550	50.79%	12,162	49.21%	388	1.58%	24,712

==== Results by county swing ====
Swing compared to the 1792 election
County	Party		Status
County	Democratic-Republican	Federalist	Status
County	± pp	± pp	Status
Allegheny	▲33.58 pp	▼33.58 pp	Gain
Bedford	No data	No data	N/A
Berks	▲18.65 pp	▼18.65 pp	Flip
Bucks	▼21.59 pp	▲21.59 pp	Gain
Chester	▼12.35 pp	▲12.35 pp	Gain
Cumberland	▲28.26 pp	▼28.26 pp	Gain
Dauphin	▼14.64 pp	▲14.64 pp	Gain
Delaware	▲21.50 pp	▼21.50 pp	Loss
Fayette	▲34.85 pp	▼34.85 pp	Gain
Franklin	No data	No data	N/A
Greene	No data	No data	New
Huntingdon	▼29.57 pp	▲29.57 pp	Gain
Lancaster	▲21.65 pp	▼21.65 pp	Loss
Luzerne	▼0.15 pp	▲0.15 pp	Gain
Mifflin	No data	No data	N/A
Montgomery	▼4.83 pp	▲4.83 pp	Gain
Northampton	▲0.03 pp	▼0.03 pp	Gain
Northumberland	▲42.74 pp	▼42.74 pp	Gain
Philadelphia	▲56.67 pp	▼56.67 pp	Flip
Philadelphia City	▲35.93 pp	▼35.93 pp	Flip
Somerset	No data	No data	New
Washington	No data	No data	N/A
Westmoreland	No data	No data	N/A
York	▲1.75 pp	▼1.75 pp	Loss
Total	▲19.37 pp	▼19.37 pp	Flip

=== Results by district ===
1796 United States presidential election in Pennsylvania
District	E.V.	Thomas Jefferson Democratic-Republican			John Adams Federalist			Margin		Total (Note: Due to missing county results data, the highest performing federalist candidate of the at-large district is represented instead.) (Note: Greene county's results were not reported in time to be included in the Official Proclamation, and has been excluded from the district results below, where applicable.)
District	E.V.	#	%	E.V.	#	%	E.V.	#	%	Total
At-large	15	12,340	50.25%	14	12,217	49.75%	1	123	0.50%	24,557
Total	15	12,340	50.25%	14	12,217	49.75%	1	123	0.50%	24,557

=== Results by elector ===
1796 United States presidential election in Pennsylvanvia
Party	Candidate	Votes	%
Democratic-Republican	Thomas McKean	12,306	3.36%
Democratic-Republican	James Boyd	12,294	3.36%
Democratic-Republican	William Brown	12,282	3.35%
Democratic-Republican	John Whitehill	12,280	3.35%
Democratic-Republican	Peter Muhlenberg	12,274	3.35%
Democratic-Republican	Abraham Smith	12,271	3.35%
Democratic-Republican	Jacob Morgan	12,269	3.35%
Democratic-Republican	James Hanna	12,267	3.35%
Democratic-Republican	John Smilie	12,266	3.35%
Democratic-Republican	John Piper	12,260	3.35%
Democratic-Republican	Joseph Hiester	12,260	3.35%
Democratic-Republican	William Irvine	12,237	3.34%
Federalist	Robert Coleman	12,217	3.34%
Federalist	Samuel Miles	12,214	3.34%
Democratic-Republican	William Maclay	12,208	3.33%
Democratic-Republican	Jonas Hartzell	12,201	3.33%
Federalist	Samuel Postlethwaite	12,197	3.33%
Federalist	William Wilson	12,190	3.33%
Federalist	Israel Whelen	12,185	3.33%
Federalist	John Carson	12,175	3.32%
Democratic-Republican	James Edgar	12,173	3.32%
Federalist	Henry Wynkoop	12,164	3.32%
Federalist	Thomas Bull	12,158	3.32%
Federalist	Jacob Hay	12,145	3.32%
Federalist	Benjamin Elliott	12,137	3.31%
Federalist	John Woods	12,136	3.31%
Federalist	Valentine Eckert	12,134	3.31%
Federalist	Ephraim Douglas	12,132	3.31%
Federalist	John Arndt	12,096	3.30%
Federalist	Thomas Stokely	12,071	3.30%
Total votes		366,199	100.00%

== See also ==
- United States presidential elections in Pennsylvania
