= Eckerle =

Eckerle is a surname. According to Hanks, the surname is of South German origin and is a derivative of Eckert. (Note: Eckert is a disambiguation page which includes a list of people with the surname.) A pair of published genealogies indicate the surname arriving in the United States from Germanic territories.

== Prevalence ==
=== United States ===
The United States census provides resources related to the prevalence of surnames for its decennial national censuses. In the 2010 census, "Eckerle" appeared 764 times, or 0.26 times per 100,000 people, having an overall rank of 30,538 and was associated primarily (95.55%) with white respondents. In the 2000 census, the surname appeared 787 times, or 0.29 times per 100,000 people, having an overall rank of 28,522 and was associated primarily (96.82%) with white respondents. In the 1990 census, the surname had a rank of 47,576. As of 1997, "Eckerle" was found 320 times out of 88.7 million names (about 0.36 times per 100,000 people) in a commercially available electronic phone registry.

== People with the surname ==
- Dinah Eckerle (b. 1995), German handballer
- Franz Eckerle (1912–1942), German World War II flying ace
- Isabella Eckerle, German virologist
- Jeff Eckerle (b. bef. 1996), American television producer and writer
