= Eker (surname) =

Eker is a surname. Notable people with the name include:

- Bård Eker (born 1961), Norwegian industrial designer and entrepreneur
- Gunvor Katharina Eker (1906–1980), Norwegian politician
- İlhan Eker (born 1983), Turkish football player
- Mehmet Mehdi Eker, Turkish politician
- Selçuk Eker (born 1991), Turkish boxer
- T. Harv Eker (born 1954), Canadian author and businessman

== See also ==
- Ecker (surname)
