= Eckart =

Eckart is a German surname, as well as a given name. Notable people with these names include:

== Surname ==
- Anselm Eckart (1721–1809), German Jesuit missionary
- Carl Eckart (1902–1973), American geophysicist and administrator
- Dennis E. Eckart (born 1950), American lawyer, former member of the U.S. House of Representatives
- Dietrich Eckart (1868–1923), German journalist, poet and one of the founders of the Deutsche Arbeiterparte
- Gabriele Eckart (born 1954), German philosopher and author
- Malcolm Eckart, American race car driver who drove Hudson cars in the Carrera Panamericana race in the 1950s
- Max-Eckart Wolff (1902–1988), German naval commander in the Kriegsmarine of Nazi Germany during World War II
- William Eckart Lehman (1821–1895), Democratic member of the U.S. House of Representatives from Pennsylvania
- William and Jean Eckart, American husband-and-wife team of theatre designers in the 1950s and 1960s

== Given name ==
- Eckart Afheldt (1921–1999), German general in the Bundeswehr
- Eckart Berkes (1949–2014), German hurdler
- Eckart Breitschuh (born 1964), German comic-book artist and author
- Eckart Diesch, German sailor
- Eckart Dux (1926–2024), German voice actor, film and television actor
- Eckart Höfling (1936–2014), German Catholic priest who worked combating poverty in Brazil
- Eckart Kehr (1902–1933), Marxist German historian
- Eckart Marsch (born 1947), German theoretical physicist
- Eckart Preu (born 1969), East German-born conductor
- Eckart Ratz (born 1953), Austrian President of the Supreme Court of Justice
- Eckart Schütrumpf (born 1939), American classicist and academician
- Eckart Suhl (born 1943), field hockey player from Germany
- Eckart Viehweg (1948–2010), German mathematician
- Eckart-Wilhelm von Bonin (1911–1943), German Second World War fighter ace
- Eckart von Hirschhausen (born 1967), German physician, comedian and talk show host
- Eckart von Klaeden (born 1965), German politician of the Christian Democratic Union
- Eckart Wagner (1938–2002), German sailor
- Eckart Witzigmann, Austrian chef
- Treuer Eckart, a character from German heroic legend and folklore

== See also ==
- Eckert (disambiguation)
- Eckhart (disambiguation)
- Ekkehard (includes people named Eckard and Eckhard)
