= Florence Bonime =

American novelist

Florence Bonime (1907-1990) was an American novelist. She also published under the name Florence Cummings.

== Life ==
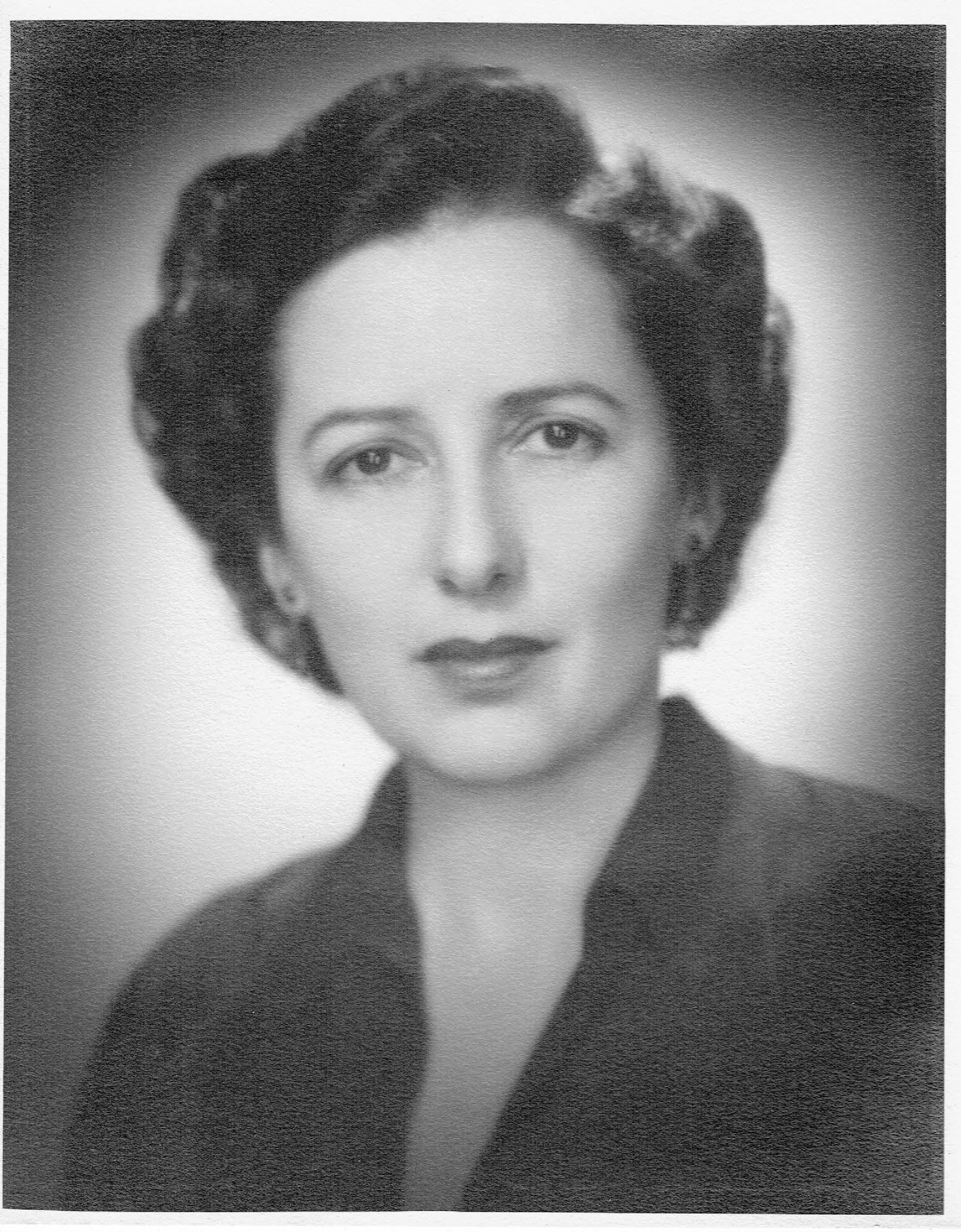
Florence Bonime

Florence Bonime was born May 12, 1907 in the Bronx.

When she was 16 she began working in advertising, eventually becoming a copywriter.

After divorcing a previous husband, Louis Cummings, she married the psychoanalyst Walter Bonime in 1953. She later co-authored papers on psychoanalysis with both him and Marianne Eckardt.

In the 1960s and 1970s she taught fiction-writing at the New School for Social Research. In 1964, aged 57, she gained a BA from Brooklyn College. In 1979 she completed a PhD at Union Institute in Cincinnati.

She died at her home in Manhattan on October 2, 1990. Some of her papers are held at the Howard Gotlieb Archival Research Center at Boston University.

She was survived by her husband, Dr Walter Bonime, her son Frank Cummings, her daughter Norma Ruth Lovins, her step-daughter Karen Bonime her step-son Stephen Bonime, nine grandchildren, and three great-grandchildren.

== Works ==
- (as Florence Cummings) The good Mrs. Shephard. New York: Crown Publishers, 1950.
- A Thousand Imitations. Harcourt, Brace and World, 1967.
- (with Marianne H. Eckardt) 'On Psychoanalyzing Literary Characters', Journal of the American Academy of Psychoanalysis, vol. 5, no. 2 (1977)
- (with Walter Bonime) 'Psychoanalytic Writing: An Essay on Communication', Journal of the American Academy of Psychoanalysis, vol. 6, no. 3 (1978)
