= Eckhart =

Eckhart may be:

== People with the surname Eckhart ==
- Meister Eckhart (c. 1260–c. 1328), German theologian
- Johann Georg von Eckhart (1664–1730), German historian and linguist
- Dietrich Eckart (1868–1923), German journalist and political activist
- Aaron Eckhart (born 1968), American film actor
- Lisa Eckhart (born 1992), Austrian comedian and slam poet

== Other ==
- Eckhart Tolle (born 1948) is a German-born writer and public speaker living in Canada.
- Eckhart von Hochheim, a.k.a. Meister Eckhart, a German theologian and philosopher
- Mason Eckhart, a comic book character
- Eckhart (TV series), a Canadian animated children's TV show
- Eckhart Branch Railroad, early short line railroad

== See also ==
- Eckart
- Eckert (disambiguation)
