= Marianne Eckardt =

German-born American psychoanalyst, translator, and editor (1913–2018)

Marianne Horney Eckardt (February 12, 1913 – August 31, 2018) was a German-born American psychoanalyst, translator and editor.

== Life ==
Marianne Horney grew up in Berlin, the second daughter of psychoanalyst Karen Horney and businessman Oskar Horney. Her older sister was the actress Brigitte Horney. At the age of 10, Marianne was analyzed by Melanie Klein. After her parents separated in 1926, she and her two sisters lived with her mother. She began her medical education at the University of Freiburg, the Ludwig-Maximilians-Universität München, and the Friedrich Wilhelm University of Berlin from 1930 to 1933, but entered the University of Chicago School of Medicine in October 1933. She there joined her mother, who had become the educational director of the University of Chicago's new psychoanalytic institute. She received her medical degree at the University of Chicago in 1937 and subsequently trained as a psychiatrist at the Payne Whitney Clinic in New York City until 1939, undertaking a psychoanalytic training with Erich Fromm. She completed her training in 1944. Her major influences as a psychoanalyst came from the interpersonal theories of Adolph Meyer, Clara Thompson, and Harry Sullivan and from Erich Fromm’s emphasis on the relationship of the individual to their culture. In 1941, she married Wolf von Eckardt, the son of Gertrude von Eckardt-Lederer and Emil Lederer, the founding dean of the University in Exile in New York. They lived in Washington D.C. where she established a private psychoanalytic practice.

In 1956, she was a founding member of the American Academy of Psychoanalysis (now the American Academy of Psychodynamic Psychiatry and Psychoanalysis), and she served as President of the Academy in 1972-73. In 1975, she divorced and moved to New York City where she maintained a practice into her nineties. She relocated to Southern California, and then at the age of 100 to Providence, Rhode Island.

== Works ==
- (tr.) Eros und Kultur by Herbert Marcuse. Translated from the English Eros and Civilization, 1957.
- (with Florence Bonime) 'On Psychoanalyzing Literary Characters', Journal of the American Academy of Psychoanalysis, Vol. 5, No. 2, pp. 159-174.
- (ed.) The Adolescent Diaries of Karen Horney, 1980
