= Linda West Eckhardt =

American journalist

Linda West Eckhardt (born September 29, 1939) is an American culinary writer, author of 18 books, including The Only Texas Cookbook (1981), American Gumbo (1983), Bread In Half The Time (with Diana Butts, 1991), and Entertaining 101 (with Katherine West DeFoyd, 1997). Her books have won James Beard and Julia Child awards. She was the first food editor of Texas Monthly (1973–). Founder and Editor/Publisher of Everybody Eats News, The Online Newspaper that monitors the sustainable food movement http://www.everybodyeatsnews.com. (2011-), and a contributor to today.com http://www.today.com.

== Biography ==
Raised in Hereford, Texas, Linda West took a B.S. in foods and nutrition at the University of Texas, and wrote the "Dining In" column for Texas Monthly, while raising a family in Houston. In the early 1980s she moved to Menlo Park, California, where she completed an M.F.A. in creative writing at San Francisco State University, then to Ashland, Oregon, where she began writing on cooking, dining, and travel, and was a columnist for The Oregonian. In the late 1990s, she moved to Maplewood, New Jersey, where she has collaborated on several books with her daughter, Katherine West Defoyd. She is an independent consultant on food and travel.

== Published works ==
- The Only Texas Cookbook (in print since 1981)
- American Gumbo (later released as Feed Your Family on $10 a day), 1983
- The New West Cuisine, 1985
- Linda Eckhardt's Guide to America's Best Foods, 1987
- Bread in Half the Time, 1991
- Rustic European Breads from Your Bread Machine, 1993, second edition 2014
- Entertaining 101, 1999
- Stylish One Dish Dinners, 2001
- Cakes in Half the Time, 2003
- The Dog Ate It: Cooking for yourself and your four-legged friends, 2006
- http://www.everybodyeatsnews.com, 2011

== Awards ==
- 1991: Julia Child Award for Best Book of the Year, International Association of Culinary Professionals, Bread in Half the Time
- 1998: James Beard Award for Best Entertaining Cookbook, Entertaining 101
- 1999: James Beard Award nomination for best single subject cookbook "Stylish One dish Dinners"
- 2001: James Beard award nomination for radio "I know what you ate last summer" The Food & Wine Radio network
- 2005: Whose Who in American University Women
