= Robb Eckert =

American politician

Member of the North Dakota House of Representatives from the 47th district
- In office January 21, 2022 – December 1, 2022 Serving with Lawrence Klemin
- Preceded by: George Keiser
- Succeeded by: Mike Motschenbacher

Personal details
- Party: Republican

Robb Eckert is an American politician. He served as a Republican member for the 47th district of the North Dakota House of Representatives.

In 2022, Eckert was elected for the 47th district of the North Dakota House of Representatives, to replace George Keiser, who had died of amyotrophic lateral sclerosis in December 2021. Eckert assumed office on January 21, 2022, but decided not to run for re-election, and was succeeded by Mike Motschenbacher on December 1, 2022.
