= Eckart Breitschuh =

German comic-book artist and author

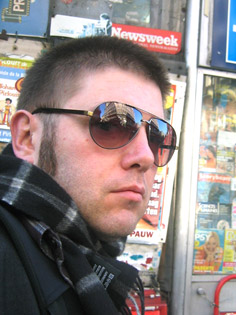
- Eckart Breitschuh, 2004
- Born: 16 August 1964 (age 62)
- Known for: Comic-book artist, Author

Eckart Breitschuh (born 16 August 1964 in Karlsruhe) is a German comic-book artist and author.

== Early life and education ==
Growing up in southern Hesse Darmstadt, Breitschuh was enthusiastic about comics from a young age. He was particularly impressed with comics from the French Caucasus Group, Manfred Schmidt, Nick Static in his early teens, along with some underground American comics, especially from Robert Crumb and S. Clay Wilson.

After graduating from college and serving in the civil service, he worked at several jobs over the next few years, including illustration work for advertising agencies, comic art for magazines and was the lead singer in several local bands. He reportedly, in this time, was an avid drug user. In 1988, he started a relationship with the literary scholar Lorraine Flack, and in 1989 they moved in together in Hamburg.

From 1990 to 1994 he studied Visual Communication at the University of Fine Arts Hamburg.

== Career ==
In 1991 his comic "The Interesting Case of Dierckhoff's Death" appeared in the Hamburg periodical SCENE. Then the Carlsen publishing house took note of him and from 1992 to 1995 he produced five seasons for the TV series Linden road at Carlsen. At the same time he worked in an animation studio, making storyboards, illustrations, and short commercials for film and advertising.

In 1997 he released his artwork done along with author Irma Corridor, "Cannibals on the Reeperbahn" in his first experience with digital media. In 1998 the first episodes of "Wanda Caramba" were published, a four-volume Crime comic in U.S. comic form, along with "Conspiracy against Berti", and the "World Cup project" of Egmont Ehapa publishing.

In 1999 he worked on his first children's book, Lotta Schlotter along with the last two volumes of Wanda Caramba series. In 2000 he was again the chief animator for a number of series and worked as a freelance editor. He then worked on the subsequent Wanda Caramba series, Bear Cage, for which he won the ICOM Independent prize. In 2002, the complete series of Wanda Carambra was published.

In 2003 he worked alongside the theologian Dr. Andreas Köhn on the concept of an apocalypse and made a comic version. It appeared in GRIMM along with various horror stories for Levin Novelty Tinplate comics. In 2004 he ran his one-page series Patty Party Girl nationwide in 36 magazines. In 2005 he published Wide Heavy Metal Shoe and the short story A Mother's Love (with author Josef Rother) published in the Tinplate book Horrorschocker #6.

After Heavy Metal, in 2006 he published the first Argstein episode, "The Law of the Forest" (also with author Josef Rother), released in the spring of 2007 in German at Ehapa. Another Argstein series followed in October 2009 in the anthology series of Worlds of Terror in Tinplate comics.

== Personal life and influences ==
Breitschuh major influences included André Franquin, Will Eisner, Mike Mignola, and Régis Loisel. He now lives in Hamburg-St. Pauli with Lorraine Flack and their three children.
