= Harry Eckler =

Canadian softball player

Harry Eckler (15 October 1916 – 25 May 2011) was a former ball player. From the 1940s -1950s he was considered to be the finest hardball and fastpitch softball first baseman in Canada. He played first base on fastball teams that represented Canada in four world Tournaments. He was elected into the Canadian Baseball softball Hall of Fame in 1991. He was also the owner of the Mercury Night club with Joe Krol and Sam Luftspring. Harry and his wife Shirley won many Trophies in Latin American Dancing.
