= Anselm Eckart =

German Jesuit missionary

Personal life
- Born: 4 August 1721 Mainz
- Died: 29 June 1809 (aged 87) Polotsk, Polish Russia

Religious life
- Religion: Society of Jesus

Anselm Eckart (4 August 1721 – 29 June 1809) was a German Jesuit missionary.

== Life ==
Eckart was born in Mainz, in what is now Germany. Entering the Society of Jesus at nineteen, he was sent as a missionary to Brazil. Two years after his arrival in that country, he and his Jesuit brethren were arrested in the aftermath of the Távora affair and carried to Portugal. There they were kept in prison.

Eckart was confined for eighteen years in the underground dungeons of Almeida and St. Julian. He wrote the story of his own sufferings and those of his companions in prison. Upon the death of Joseph I of Portugal in 1777, the Jesuits' opponent Sebastião José de Carvalho e Melo, Marquis of Pombal fell into disgrace, and those of his victims who survived were released.

The Society of Jesus, which had been suppressed four years earlier by the Brief of Pope Clement XIV, had continued to exist in Russia. Eckart applied for readmission, and spent another 32 years in this way in the order. After filling the office of Master of Novices at Dünaburg, he was sent to the College of Polotsk, Polish Russia, where he died aged 87.
