= Gisela Eckhardt =

German physicist, inventor and entrepreneur (1926–2020)

- Born: 28 October 1926; Frankfurt, Germany
- Died: 30 January 2020 (aged 93); Malibu, California, United States
- Education: Johann Wolfgang Goethe University
- Known for: Raman laser
- Scientific career
- Workplaces: Hughes Research Laboratories

Gisela Eckhardt (28 October 1926 – 30 January 2020) was a German physicist and co-developer of the Raman laser.

== Early years ==
Eckhardt grew up as a child of a Frankfurt electrical wholesaler, who died when she was only 13 years old. She became interested in physics at the age of 12 while at the Wöhler School in Frankfurt.

After graduation she studied physics at the Johann Wolfgang Goethe University Frankfurt am Main. She graduated in 1952 with a diploma, with a diploma thesis on the extension of the scope of Christiansen filters to the infrared. In 1958 she received her doctorate.

== Career ==
She then went to the United States together with her husband Wilfried, who also received his PhD in physics shortly before. There, they first worked for the electronics group RCA, where they had to go to another laboratory of the group, since married couples were not hired there at the time. While her husband was in Princeton's main lab, she was in the semiconductor lab in Somerville, at a slightly lower pay. She managed to invent an improved method for polishing silicon wafers, but this did not promote her career. She was openly told that she needed to work twice as hard as a man to be promoted.

In 1960, like many other RCA employees who were dissatisfied with management and pay, she moved to California's booming high technology industry, and in 1960, with her husband, accepted a much larger job offer from Hughes Research Laboratories in Malibu. Here she was involved in the development of the first Raman laser in 1962, which used nitrobenzene as a liquid laser medium and a ruby laser with Q-switch as a pump laser. The Raman laser made it possible to produce laser beams on a wide range of wavelengths. The patent listed Woodbury and Eckhardt as inventors. Eckhardt was in 1963 significantly involved in the realization of a first Raman laser on diamond base.

Soon after patenting, for personal reasons, she moved to a department that developed methods for converting AC to DC and vice versa in power electronics, and later became her husband's laboratory manager. Together with her husband, she successfully ran various photo shops in the US as a franchisee.

From 1977 to 1979, she was on the executive committee of the Gaseous Electronics Conference, where she organized panel discussions. In 1982 she co-edited Applied Physics A (Solids and Surfaces). In 2014 she gave a keynote address at the Europhoton Conference in Zürich on the occasion of the 50th anniversary of her discovery.

Eckhardt lived in Malibu and in Frankfurt-Sachsenhausen.

== Literature ==
Alumni in the portrait. Questions to Dr. med. Gisela Eckhardt. In: Insight. The Magazine for Alumni & Friends [of the Johann Wolfgang Goethe University], issue 37, November 2017, p. 12-13.
