= Eckerd =

Eckerd may refer to:

- Eckerd Corporation (Eckerd Pharmacy), former American drugstore chain
- Eckerd College, private liberal arts college in St. Petersburg, Florida, United States
  - Eckerd College Search and Rescue, a student volunteer maritime search and rescue team
  - Eckerd Tritons, an intercollegiate sports team representing Eckerd College
- Eckerd Open, defunct WTA Tour affiliated women's tennis tournament
- Ruth Eckerd Hall, a performing arts venue in Clearwater, Florida

== People ==
- Jack Eckerd (1913–2004), American businessman
