= Wolf Von Eckardt =

American writer (1918–1995)

Wolf Von Eckardt (6 March 1918 – 27 August 1995) was a German-American writer, art and architecture critic for the Washington Post.

== Life ==
Wolf Von Eckardt was born in Berlin on 6 March 1918. His mother, Gertrude von Eckardt-Lederer, was Jewish, and his father Emil Lederer was a Jewish socialist professor of political economy. His parents divorced when he was a boy. Von Eckardt was excluded from school in Germany for being Jewish. He worked as a printer's apprentice before fleeing Germany in 1936 with a younger sister and their mother. On arrival in the United States, he found work as a printer's apprentice and took classes at the New School for Social Research. He later worked designing book covers for Alfred A. Knopf. In 1941, he married Karen Horney's daughter Marianne Horney, also a psychoanalyst. During World War II, he served in Army intelligence, and after the war, worked as an adviser to the West German government. In 1963, he started working at the Washington Post. His marriage to Marianne Horney ended in 1975. In 1981, he left The Post but wrote about architecture for Time until 1985 and continued teaching and writing until his first stroke in 1989.

In 1987, Von Eckardt married again, to Nina Ffrench-Frazier. He died of complications after a stroke on 27 August 1995 at his home in Jaffrey, New Hampshire.

== Works ==
- Eric Mendelsohn, 1960
- Otto Dorfner, 1960
- Mid-century architecture in America: honor awards of the American Institute of Architects, 1949–1961, 1961
- Bulldozers and bureaucrats; cities and urban renewal, 1963
- (with Charles Goodman) Life for dead spaces; the development of the Lavanburg Commons, 1963
- The challenge of Megalopolis: a graphic presentation of the urbanized Northeastern seaboard of the United States, 1964
- A place to live: the crisis of the cities. Foreword by August Heckscher. 1967
- Bertolt Brecht's Berlin: a scrapbook of the twenties, 1975
- Proposal for a National Museum of the Building Arts, 1978
- Back to the drawing board!: Planning livable cities, 1978
- Live the good life!: creating a human community through the arts, 1982
- Oscar Wilde's London: a scrapbook of vices and virtues, 1880–1900, 1987
