= Eckert Building =

- U.S. National Register of Historic Places
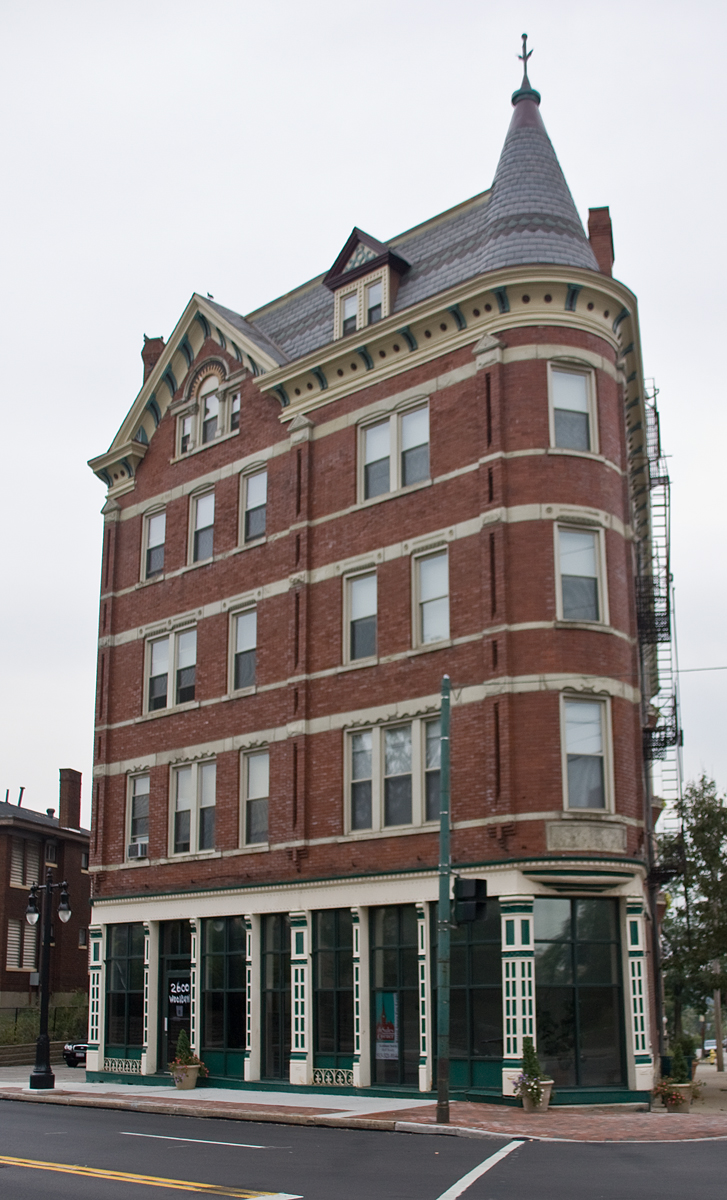
- The building in 2008

- Location within Ohio Location within the United States
- Location: Cincinnati, Ohio
- Coordinates: 39°07′38″N 84°28′42″W
- Built: c. 1896
- Built for: Valentine Eckert
- Architectural style: Queen Anne
- NRHP reference No.: 83001981
- Added to NRHP: 29 September 1983

Eckert Building is a historic building in Cincinnati, Ohio. It was listed in the National Register of Historic Places on September 29, 1983.

== Description and history ==
The large multi–story mixed residential/commercial use building sits on a foundation of rock faced limestone in an ashlar pattern capped with a smooth plinth course. The main wall treatment is deep red brick with sandstone belt courses that become ornamented lintels. The lintels vary on each floor. String courses run in line with lug sills. A decorative frontispiece with a glazed brick arch and name plate is on the south facade. It is an example of Queen Anne style architecture in the United States. It is the only example of its kind on the east side of the Cincinnati. It was built for Valentine Eckert, who operated a notions business with his brother Joseph, as an investment property.

== See also ==
- Historic preservation
- National Register of Historic Places listings in Cincinnati
