= Eckart Marsch =

German theoretical physicist

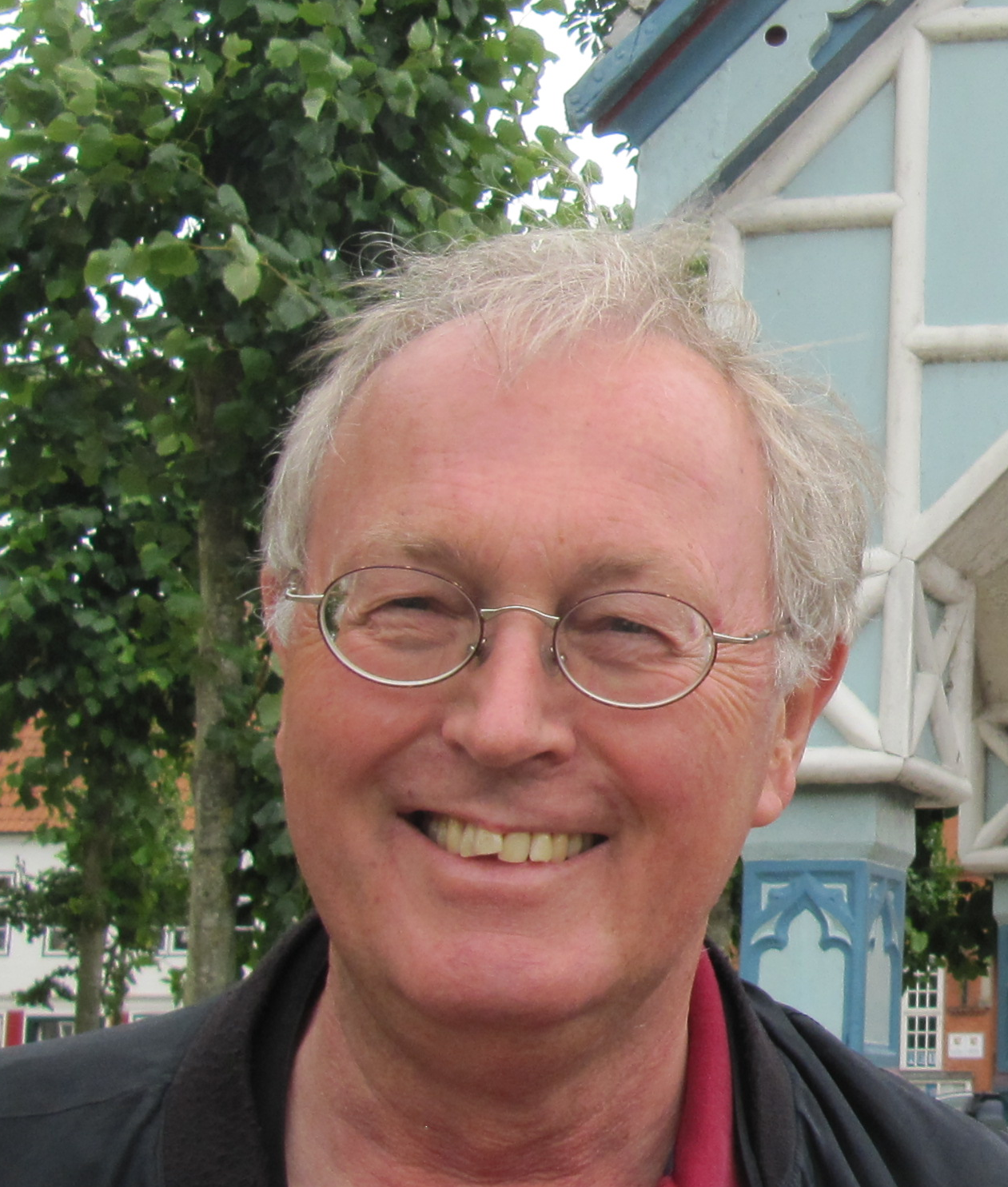
- Theoretical physicist Eckart Marsch visiting his hometown Friedrichstadt (Germany), 2018
- Born: 1 February 1947 (age 79); Friedrichstadt, Germany
- Awards: Fellow of the AGU (2009), Hannes Alfvén Medal (2018)
- Scientific career
- Fields: Space Plasma (physics), solar wind and solar physics, physics of condensed matter, relativistic quantum mechanics
- Institutions: Max Planck Institute for Solar System Research (until 2012), Christian-Albrechts-University Kiel (since 2012)

Eckart Marsch (born 1 February 1947 in Friedrichstadt) is a German theoretical physicist, who worked from 1980 to 2012 at the originally named Max Planck Institute for Aeronomy, from 2004 on named Max Planck Institute for Solar System Research (MPS) in Katlenburg-Lindau on the physics of the solar wind, solar corona and space plasmas and taught at the University of Göttingen.

In appreciation of his extensive theoretical, data-analytical and application-related research, as author of a large number of scientific articles and co-editor of several books on the physics of the heliosphere, heating of the solar corona, plasma physics of the solar wind and astrophysical plasmas, as co-editor of geophysical journals, especially of the well-known online journal Living Reviews in Solar Physics, as member of a variety of scientific committees and reviewer of leading scientific journals, as lecturer and associate professor at the University of Göttingen and as a personal supervisor of a large number of doctoral students and young scientists, the European Geosciences Union (EGU) in Vienna awarded him in the year 2018 the Hannes Alfvén Medal. "The Hannes Alfvén Medal goes to Eckart Marsch for his fundamental contributions to our understanding of the kinetic processes and plasma turbulence in the heliosphere, as well as to the work that has made Helios a successful mission and initiated the Solar Orbiter." As a theoretical plasma physicist, Eckart Marsch (often in collaboration with the Chinese heliospheric physicist Chuan-Yi Tu of the Peking University analyzed and interpreted in particular the extensive plasma and magnetic field data on processes in the magnetized solar wind, which were acquired over a decade using the HELIOS space probes between the Earth and the Sun. In the crucial initial stages he planned and coordinated the development of the ESA solar mission Solar Orbiter, which now is scheduled to launch in 2020. Eckart Marsch is a Fellow of the American Geophysical Union (AGU).

As part of his diploma and doctoral thesis he had studied the physics of condensed matter at the Christian-Albrechts-Universität Kiel. After his retirement in 2012 he again works there, now as a retired scientist, among others topics on relativistic quantum mechanics and quantum field theory.

== Academic career ==
After attending high school in Husum and serving in the German army in Nordfriesland (district), Eckart Marsch, born in Friedrichstadt (Schleswig-Holstein) in 1968, studied physics at the Karlsruhe Institute of Technology and the Technische Universität Berlin, and after his undergraduate degree at the University of Kiel. Here he finished his studies with the diploma in 1973 and acquired the title Dr. rer. nat. in theoretical physics. Topic of his doctoral thesis was "Transport coefficients and susceptibilities of the Hubbard model in the Hartree–Fock approximation". From 1976 to 1980 he worked as a research assistant at the Max Planck Institute for Extraterrestrial Physics(MPE) in Garching near Munich.

As a research associate and later scientific group leader, he then worked until his retirement at the beginning of 2012 at the former Max Planck Institute for Aeronomy, from 2004 named as Max Planck Institute for Solar System Research (MPS) in Katlenburg-Lindau (Nordheim County, Lower Saxony). During this time he also worked in between as a visiting scientist at the Center for Space Research at MIT in Cambridge (USA), at the Observatoire de Paris in Meudon (France), at the Institute for Astronomy in Cambridge (England), as guest lecturer and guest professor at the Physical Institute of the University of Bern (Switzerland), from 1996 as an adjunct professor at the University of Göttingen. Since 1990 he has been habilitated at the University of Göttingen for astronomy and astrophysics. His habilitation was titled "Kinetic Physics of the Solar Wind".

Although he declined a call as a C4 professor to the University of Kiel in 1999, he finally, after his retirement in 2012, accepted there a one-year teaching assignment at the Institute for Experimental and Applied Physics. As a retired scientist, in cooperation with a former doctoral student at the MPS, Yasuhito Narita from the Institute for Space Research of the Austrian Academy of Sciences in Graz, he deals intensively with recent ideas on relativistic quantum mechanics and quantum field theory.

== Scientific work areas ==
In his professional career as a theoretical physicist, the father of three now grown-up children, focused on plasma physics, the solar corona, the physical processes in the heliosphere, the particles, waves and turbulences in the solar wind, and the effects of space weather. Since the year 2000, he has taken the lead in defining the scientific goals of the future ESA mission "Solar Orbiter" (Start 2020) and accompanied some of the instrumental development work. He has participated in a number of summer schools and workshops, has been instrumental in shaping the content and design of scientific books, has co-edited scientific journals, and been the author and co-author of more than three hundred research articles, some of which are frequently quoted. He has been a member of major scientific panels and has worked as a reviewer for leading scientific journals. The goal of the theoretician Eckart Marsch was always to reconcile theoretical and analytical knowledge with the observational data obtained by solar and space probes, and also to gain a global view of the complex physical processes involved. Main goals of his work were to gain knowledge about the formation, heating and acceleration of the solar wind in the inner heliosphere, as well as to analyse plasma turbulence in the context of magnetohydrodynamics and with the help of kinetic theories.

Through statistical analysis, in particular of the data obtained from the HELIOS spacecraft, he studied in his research the properties of the three-dimensional flow structures of the solar wind and discovered special features of the anisotropic, radial development of the velocity distribution functions of protons and alpha particles. He succeeded in detecting the occurrence of wave-particle interactions by means of in situ measurements. He early brought the possibility of plasma heating and acceleration by ion cyclotron resonance processes into play. In addition to the study of turbulent MHD energy cascade models and dissipation processes using wave modes, he also developed kinetic models for the analysis of various turbulence phenomena in the largely collision-free plasma of the solar wind. For the first time, he carried out MHD model calculations and data analysis, employing profitably Elsasser variables, and analyzed the multifractal nature of fluctuations and their dissipation in turbulent energy cascades. Eckart Marsch received the awards for his life's work also as a dedicated supervisor of doctoral students and as a teacher of young students with strong interest in heliospheric and space plasma physics. For many years he gave regularly lectures at the International Max Planck Research School in Katlenburg Lindau and the Georg August University in Göttingen.

== Awards ==
Presentation of the Hannes Alfvén medal to Eckart Marsch by the President Margit Haberrreiter of the EGU Division on Solar-Terrestrial Sciences, Vienna 2018

In recognition of his high scientific rank in geophysics, he was named an AGU Fellow in 2009 by the President of the American Geophysical Union (AGU).

Due to his many contributions to a deeper understanding of heliospheric physical processes, he was awarded the Hannes Alfvén Medal in 2018 at the annual meeting of the European Geosciences Union (EGU).

== Publication of books ==
- R. Schwenn, E. Marsch (eds.) Physics of the Inner Heliosphere 1 – Large-Scale Phenomena; in: Physics and Chemistry in Space 20. Springer-Verlag, Heidelberg (1990)
- R. Schwenn, E. Marsch (eds.) Physics of the Inner Heliosphere 2 – Particles, Waves and Turbulence; in: Physics and Chemistry in Space 21. Springer-Verlag, Heidelberg (1991)
- E. Marsch, R. Schwenn (eds.) Solar Wind Seven – COSPAR Colloquia Series. Pergamon Press, Oxford, England (1992)
- C.-Y. Tu, E. Marsch, MHD Structures, Waves and Turbulence in the Solar Wind, Observations and Theories. Academic Publishers, reprinted by Space Science Reviews, Vol. 73, Nos. 1–2, 1–210 (1995)
- J. Büchner, W.I. Axford, E.Marsch, V.M. Vasyliunas (eds.) Plasma Astrophysics and Space Physics, Kluwer Academic Publishers, Dordrecht, The Netherlands (1999)
- K. Scherer, H. Fichtner, E. Marsch (eds.) "The Outer Heliosphere: Beyond the Planets." Copernicus Society, Katlenburg Lindau, ISBN 3-9804862-3-0 (2000)
- K. Scherer, H. Fichtner, H.-J. Fahr, E. Marsch (eds.) "The Outer Heliosphere: The Next Frontiers." COSPAR Colloquia Series, Vol. 11, Pergamon, ISBN 0-444-50909-7 (2001)
- D. Burgess, J. Drake, E. Marsch, R. von Steiger, M. Velli, T. Zurbuchen (eds.) Multi-Scale Physics in Coronal Heating and Solar Wind Acceleration. Space Science Series of ISSI, Vol. 38, Springer, New York, ISSN 1385-7525 (2013)
- G.P. Zank, J. Borovsky, R. Bruno, J. Cirtain, S. Cranmer, H. Elliott, J. Giacalone, W. Gonzalez, G. Li, E. Marsch, E. Moebius, N. Pogorelov, J Spann, O. Verkhoglyadova (eds.) Solar Wind 13: Proceedings of the Thirteenth International Solar Wind Conference. AIP Conference Proceedings (2013)
- U. von Kusserow, E. Marsch. Magnetisches Sonnensystem - Solare Eruptionen, Sonnenwinde und das Weltraumwetter. Sptinger Nature (2023) ISBN 978-3-662-65400-2, eBook ISBN 978-3-662-65401-9
