= Guido Hermann Eckardt =

German musician and journalist (1873–1951)

Guido Herman Eckardt (1873–1951) was a German-language author, musician and journalist from Estonia who used the pseudonym Fritz Geron Pernauhm for his literary works.

== Life ==
Eckardt was born in Pärnu, Estonia, on 19 September 1873 (7 September Old Style). His father Guido Heinrich Eckardt (1843–1906) was a lawyer who also wrote poetry and journalism in local newspapers.

He studied music in Munich, Geneva, Berlin and Paris. In Munich he was acquainted with German authors such as Thomas Mann, Frank Wedekind and Max Halbe. After a stay in Rome, he returned home to Liepāja (Libau) where he taught Piano.

In 1908 he moved to Riga, working as a journalist for the newspaper Rigasche Neueste Nachrichten and later the Rigasche Rundschau. He mainly write criticism about music, theatre and art. He married poetess and translator Elfriede Skalberg (1884-1964) with whom he would have a daughter. In Riga, he became a central figure of culture.

In 1940 he left Riga, after the Molotov–Ribbentrop Pact had effectively opened up the Baltic states for Soviet invasion and most Germans were transferred to Nazi Germany.

He died on 26 September 1951 in Überlingen, Germany.

== Works ==
Apart from his journalistic work, Eckardt remains known for three novels he published in Germany at the beginning of the 20th century, using the pseudonym Fritz Geron Pernauhm. 'Ercole Tomei' (Leipzig, 1900), 'Der junge Kurt' (Berlijn/Leipzig, 1904) and 'Die Infamen' (Leipzig, 1906)) focus on the theme of homosexuality, making him one of the first authors in German literature to openly publish on the theme.

== Sources ==
- Gottzmann, Carola L. & Hörner, Petra, 'Lexikon der deutschsprachigen Literatur des Baltikums und St. Petersburgs vom Mittelalter bis zur Gegenwart' (Berlin-New York 2007), vol. 1, p. 380
- Digital Text Repository for Older Estonian Literature, Online
- Fritz Geron Pernauhm entry on Männerschwarm
