= Eckert, Colorado =

Neighborhood in Orchard City, Colorado, Colorado, United States

- neighborhood
- Location of Eckert, Colorado. Eckert (Colorado)
- Coordinates: 38°50′34″N 107°57′46″W
- Country: United States
- State: Colorado
- County: Delta
- Town: Orchard City

Government
  - Type: Unincorporated place
  - Body: Orchard City
- Elevation: 5,568 ft (1,697 m)
- Time zone: UTC−07:00 (MST)
  - Summer (DST): UTC−06:00 (MDT)
- ZIP code: 81418
- Area codes: 970/748
- GNIS ID: 186504
- FIPS code: 08-55980

Eckert is a U.S. post office and neighborhood of the Town of Orchard City in Delta County, Colorado, United States. The Eckert, Colorado, post office has the ZIP Code 81418.

== History ==
The Eckert, Colorado, post office opened on October 27, 1891. The community was named after Isadora "Dora" Eckert States, the wife of Charles Adelbert States, the first postmaster.

Eckert Presbyterian Church is located in the area.

== See also ==
- List of populated places in Colorado
