= Pan Zecheng =

Chinese footballer (born 2005)

Personal information
- Date of birth: 19 November 2005 (age 20)
- Place of birth: Shanghai, China
- Height: 1.81 m (5 ft 11 in)
- Positions: Midfielder; forward

Team information
- Current team: Johns Hopkins Blue Jays

Youth career
- Shanghai FA
- Shanghai Lucky Star
- 2022–2023: IMG Academy

College career
Years	Team	Apps	(Gls)
2024–	Johns Hopkins Blue Jays	40	(4)

Pan Zecheng (Chinese: 潘则诚; born 19 November 2005), known in the United States as Jason Pan, is a Chinese footballer who plays as a midfielder at the Johns Hopkins University.

== Early life ==
Pan was born in Shanghai, China, but spent most of his early life in South Africa.

== Career ==
=== Early career ===
Having played football from the age of five, Pan played in a number of youth tournaments in Shanghai as a child. He captained the Shanghai provincial team before travelling to Spain to pursue a footballing career. While in Spain, he represented a number of clubs, including Levante, before returning to China due to the COVID-19 pandemic in Spain and enrolled at the Shanghai Pinghe School, where he continued to play football at Shanghai Lucky Star.

In April 2022, he represented Serbia's Red Star Belgrade at a youth tournament in Abu Dhabi in the United Arab Emirates, scoring once in five games. In the same year, he sent highlight videos to German club FC Bayern Munich, and was accepted as the only Chinese player to join their "World Squad" initiative.

=== Collegiate soccer ===
Following his experience with the Bayern Munich World Squad, he moved to the United States to enroll at the IMG Academy in Bradenton, Florida. He was commended for his academic ability while at the school, earning a perfect score on the Advanced Placement Macroeconomics exam. Pan enrolled at the Johns Hopkins University in Baltimore in 2024. In his first season with the university's Blue Jays soccer team, he scored twice in nineteen games.
