= Tobias Eckert =

German politician (born 1980)

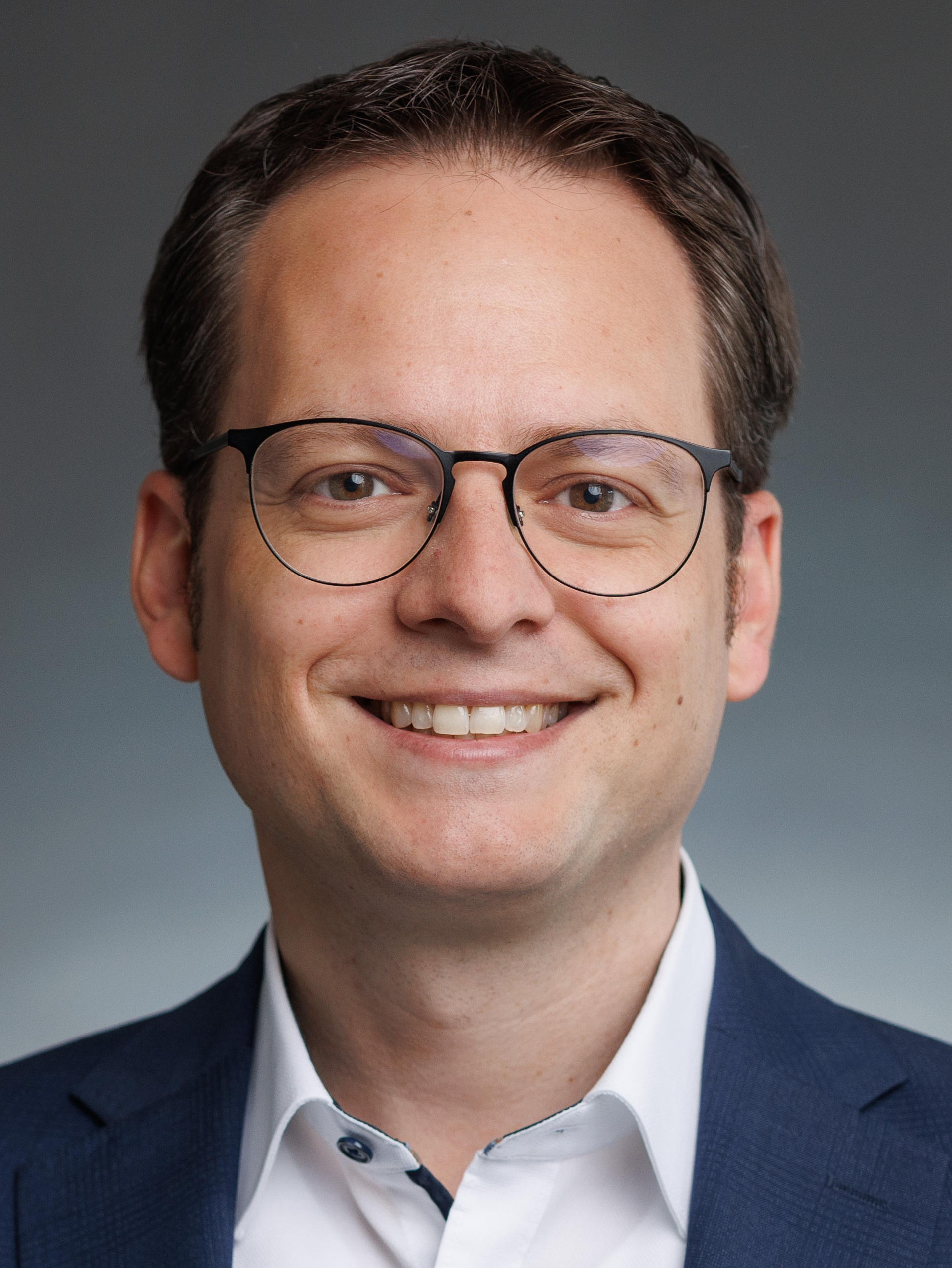
- Eckert in 2022

Member of the Landtag of Hesse
- Incumbent
- Assumed office 10 June 2012

Personal details
- Born: 18 December 1980 (age 45)
- Party: Social Democratic Party (since 1998)

Tobias Eckert (born 18 December 1980) is a German politician serving as a member of the Landtag of Hesse since 2012. He has served as group leader of the Social Democratic Party since 2024.
