= Ecker (surname) =

Ecker is a surname. Notable people with the name include:

- Alexander Ecker (1816–1877), German anthropologist and anatomist
- Cornelia Ecker (born 1976), Austrian politician
- Danny Ecker (born 1977), German pole vaulter
- Donnie Ecker (born 1986), American baseball coach
- Enrique Ecker (1923–1990), American football player
- Gerhard Ecker (born 1962), Austrian medicinal chemist and professor
- Guy Ecker (born 1959), American-Brazilian actor
- Haylie Ecker (born 1975), Australian violinist
- Janet Ecker (born 1953), Canadian politician
- John Ecker (born 1948), German-American basketball player and coach
- Johnny Ecker (born 1973), French football player
- Paul Ecker (1913–1979), German World War II officer
- Sara Virginia Ecker (1868–1950), First Lady of North Carolina
- William Ecker (1924–2009), US Navy aviator
- Wolfert Acker or Ecker (1667–1753), American colonial clergyman

== See also ==
- Eker (surname)
- Ecker, UK/Irish slang word for homework
- Eckert (disambiguation), includes list of people with surname Eckert
- Eckler, surname
