= William Eckhardt (lawyer) =

William G. Eckhardt is a lawyer, a professor of law at the University of Missouri–Kansas City, and formerly a military officer, where his most notable case was the prosecution of Captain Ernest Medina, for the My Lai Massacre.

Professor Eckhardt received his B.A., with honors from the University of Mississippi in 1963 where he was a member of the Sigma Chi fraternity. Professor Eckhardt went on to receive his LL.B., also with honors, from the University of Virginia in 1966. In addition, he earned an LL.M. Equivalent with honors from The Judge Advocate General’s School in 1970. He is a graduate of the United States Army War College, where he later served on the faculty and held the Dwight D. Eisenhower Chair of National Security.

Professor Eckhardt completed 30 years of service and retired as Colonel in the Army Judge Advocate General's Corps. His significant positions included: Chief Prosecutor in the My Lai Cases (receiving the Federal Bar Association - Federal Younger Lawyer Award for his professional efforts), Personnel Affairs Branch Chief in the Army’s Litigation Division, General Counsel to units in California and Germany, the Army’s Chief Appellate Defender and Legal Advisor to Wartime Theater Commander. His varying teaching duties included being an adjunct professor at the University of California at Berkeley.

On June 3, 2006 Eckhardt conducted an interview with the Kansas City Star where he was asked whether he saw parallels between My Lai, and the alleged massacre at Haditha, and the treatment of the detainees in the Guantanamo Bay detainment camps.
