= Valentine Eckert =

American judge (1733–1821)

Judge of the Berks County Court of Common Pleas
- In office 1784–1791

Member of the Pennsylvania General Assembly
- In office 1776–1779
- Constituency: Berks County

Delegate to the Pennsylvania Constitutional Convention
- In office July 1776 – 1776
- Constituency: Berks County

Personal details
- Born: 1733 Langenselbold, present-day Hesse, Germany
- Died: December 1821 (aged 88) Winchester, Virginia, U.S.
- Occupation: Blacksmith, politician, judge, militia officer

Valentine Eckert (1733 – December 1821) was a German-born Pennsylvania politician, militia officer, and judge active during and after the American Revolution. He represented Berks County in the Pennsylvania Provincial Conference and the Pennsylvania Constitutional Convention of 1776, served in the Pennsylvania Assembly, commanded militia during the Revolutionary War, and later served for seven years as a judge of the Berks County Court of Common Pleas.

== Early life ==
Born in Langenselbold, in present-day Hesse, Germany, he emigrated to Pennsylvania with his parents in 1741, with the family settling in the Tulpehocken Valley, east of present-day Womelsdorf. He was naturalized in September 1761, and worked as a blacksmith in Cumru Township. Eckert was a slaveholder, in 1773 placing an advertisement in The Pennsylvania Gazette offering a reward for the return of an enslaved man named Joe who had escaped Eckert's property in Cumru Township.

== Political and military career ==
In June 1776, Eckert was one of ten Berks County delegates to the Provincial Conference held at Carpenters' Hall in Philadelphia. The conference called for the election of a constitutional convention to establish a new government based on the authority of the people. The following month, Eckert was elected as one of eight Berks County delegates to the Provincial Convention that drafted the Pennsylvania Constitution of 1776.

Eckert was elected to represent Berks County in Pennsylvania's Provincial Assembly in 1776, 1777, and 1779. During the American Revolutionary War, he offered his services to the revolutionary government, which were accepted. He commanded a company of cavalry Associators and participated in the Battle of Germantown, in October, 1777, where he was wounded. Having been appointed Sub-Lieutenant of the county on March 21, 1777, he also served in this office until his promotion to Lieutenant of the County in January, 1781. He continued to act as Lieutenant until the close of the war. While serving as Sub-Lieutenant, he also acted as a commissioner for the purchase of army supplies.

On March 1, 1780, he was among the legislators who voted against the Act for the Gradual Abolition of Slavery, and he joined the formal protest entered by legislators opposed to the measure. He returned to the Assembly again on January 16, 1784, replacing John Bishop, who had declined his seat. As county lieutenant, Eckert was also involved in the supervision of prisoners of war being held at Reading. In June 1781, he reported that approximately 1,100 prisoners had arrived in the area and corresponded with Pennsylvania president Joseph Reed concerning their guarding and accommodation. Eckert, Major Bayly, and Colonel Wood were charged with selecting a site outside Reading where the prisoners could be housed in huts.

== Judicial service and later life ==
In 1784, he was appointed judge of the Court of Common Pleas of the county and occupied this office for a term of seven years, when, by the Pennsylvania Constitution of 1790, a president judge of all the courts was appointed to take the place of the several judges. In the Pennsylvania Militia, he was brigade inspector for the county from April 11, 1793, for a period of 20 years.

Around 1816 he moved to Winchester, Virginia, where he died in December 1821 at the age of 88. His son, Peter Eckert, was engaged in farming and merchandising all his life in Berks County, near Womelsdorf, the family home.
