= Greg Eckhardt =

American soccer player

Personal information
- Full name: Gregory Eckhardt
- Date of birth: January 7, 1989 (age 37)
- Place of birth: Orange Park, Florida, United States
- Height: 1.83 m (6 ft 0 in)
- Position: Defender

Youth career
- 2005: Clay County SC
- 2006–2009: Clemson Tigers

Senior career*
| Years | Team | Apps | (Gls) |
| 2008 | Atlanta Silverbacks U23's | 1 | (0) |
| 2010 | VPS | 19 | (0) |

International career
| 2008 | United States U20 | | |
- * Club domestic league appearances and goals as of August 7, 2010

Gregory Eckhardt (born January 7, 1989, in Orange Park, Florida) is an American soccer player.

== Career ==
Eckhardt began his career with Clay County SC and joined for his Studium in 2006 to the Clemson University. He was a three-year starter for the Clemson Tigers soccer team. On February 11, 2011, he left Clemson University and signed with the Finnish Veikkausliiga club Vaasan Palloseura. On February 1, 2011, he left Finland.

== Post Soccer Career ==
Greg works as the director of operations at Unum Insurance. He is also pursuing his executive MBA at the prestigious Fuqua school of business, Duke University.

Greg is married and resides in Chattanooga, TN.

== International career ==
He is a former member of the United States men's national under-20 soccer team.
