= Ekkehard =

Ekkehard (and Eckard, Eckehard, Eckhard, Ekkehart) is a Germanic dithematic name. It is composed of stems ekke "edge, blade; sword" and hart "brave; hardy". Variant forms include Eckhart and Eckart. The Anglo-Saxon form of the name was Ecgheard, possibly attested in the toponym Eggerton. Achard is a French Norman version of Ekkehard. Notable people with the name include:

== Middle Ages ==
It was the name of five monks of the Abbey of Saint Gall from the tenth to the thirteenth century:

- Ekkehard I (died 973)
- Ekkehard II (died 990)
- Ekkehard III
- Ekkehard IV (died c. 1056)
- Ekkehard V (died c. 1220)

It was also the name of two Margraves of Meissen:

- Eckard I (died 1002)
- Eckard II (died 1046)

Other notable people with that given name include:

- Ekkehard of Huysburg (died 1084), abbot of Huysburg Abbey
- Ekkehard of Aura (died 1126), chronicler and abbot of Aura Abbey
- Meister Eckhart (died c. 1327), philosopher and mystic
- Eckhard Christian (1907-1985), Luftwaffe officer
- Ekkehard von Kuenssberg (1913–2000), German doctor
- Eckhard Märzke (born 1952), German footballer
- Eckhard Pfeiffer (born 1941), German businessman

== See also ==
- Ekkehard (novel), 1855 novel by Joseph Victor von Scheffel inspired by Ekkehard II of Saint Gall
- Ekkehard (opera), 1878 opera by Johann Joseph Abert based on the novel
