= Minstrelsy of the Scottish Border =

Collection of ballads edited by Walter Scott

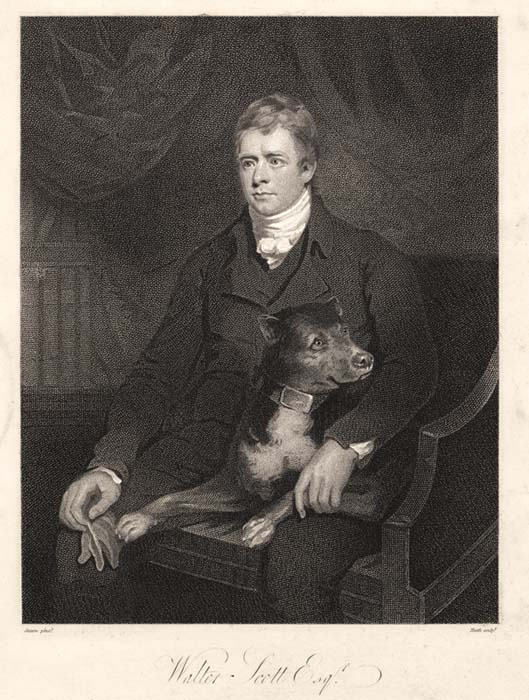
Engraving of an 1805 portrait of Walter Scott by James Saxon

Minstrelsy of the Scottish Border is an anthology of Border ballads, together with some from north-east Scotland and a few modern literary ballads, edited by Walter Scott. It was first published by Archibald Constable in Edinburgh in 1802, but was expanded in several later editions, reaching its final state in 1830, two years before Scott's death. It includes many of the most famous Scottish ballads, such as "Sir Patrick Spens", "The Young Tamlane", "The Twa Corbies", "The Douglas Tragedy", "Clerk Saunders", "Kempion", "The Wife of Usher's Well", "The Cruel Sister", "The Dæmon Lover", and "Thomas the Rhymer". Scott enlisted the help of several collaborators, notably John Leyden, and found his ballads both by field research of his own and by consulting the manuscript collections of others. Controversially, in the editing of his texts he preferred literary quality over scholarly rigour, but Minstrelsy of the Scottish Border nevertheless attracted high praise from the first. It was influential both in Britain and on the Continent, and helped to decide the course of Scott's later career as a poet and novelist. In recent years it has been called "the most exciting collection of ballads ever to appear".

== Contents ==
The contents of the 1812 edition were as follows:

- Introduction

Historical Ballads

- "Sir Patrick Spens"
- "Auld Maitland"
- "The Battle of Otterbourne"
- "The Sang of the Outlaw Murray"
- "Johnie Armstrang"
- "Lord Ewrie"
- "The Lochmaben Harper"
- "Jamie Telfer of the Fair Dodhead"
- "The Raid of the Reidswire"
- "Kinmont Willie"
- "Dick o' the Cow"
- "Jock o' the Side"
- "The Death of Featherstonhaugh"
- "Hobbie Noble"
- "Rookhope Ryde"
- "Barthram's Dirge"
- "Archie of Ca'field"
- "Armstrong's Goodnight"
- "The Fray of Support"
- "Lord Maxwell's Goodnight"
- "The Lads of Wamphray"
- "Lesly's March"
- "The Battle of Philiphaugh"
- "The Gallant Grahams"
- "The Battle of Pentland Hills"
- "The Battle of Loudon-Hill"
- "The Battle of Bothwell-Bridge"

Romantic Ballads

- "Scottish Music, an Ode", by J. Leyden
- Introduction to the Tale of Tamlane
- "The Young Tamlane"
- "Erlinton"
- "The Twa Corbies"
- "The Douglas Tragedy"
- "Young Benjie"
- "Lady Anne"
- "Lord William"
- "The Broomfield Hill"
- "Proud Lady Margaret"
- "The Original Ballad of the Broom of Cowdenknows"
- "Lord Randal"
- "Sir Hugh le Blond"
- "Græme and Bewick"
- "The Duel of Wharton and Stuart"
- "The Lament of the Border Widow"
- "Fair Helen of Kirconnell"
- "Hughie the Græme"
- "Johnie of Breadislee"
- "Katharine Janfarie"
- "The Laird o' Logie"
- "A Lyke-Wake Dirge"
- "The Dowie Dens of Yarrow"
- "The Gay Goss-Hawk"
- "Brown Adam"
- "Jellon Grame"
- "Willie's Ladye"
- "Clerk Saunders"
- "Earl Richard"
- "The Dæmon-Lover"
- "The Lass of Lochroyan"
- "Rose the Red and White Lilly"
- "Fause Foodrage"
- "Kempion"
- "Lord Thomas and Fair Annie"
- "The Wife of Usher's Well"
- "Cospatrick"
- "Prince Robert"
- "King Henrie"
- "Annan Water"
- "The Cruel Sister"
- "The Queen's Marie"
- "The Bonny Hynd"
- "O Gin My Love Were Yon Red Rose"
- "O Tell Me How to Woo Thee"
- "The Souters of Selkirk"
- "The Flowers of the Forest"
- "The Laird of Muirhead"
- "Ode on Visiting Flodden", by J. Leyden

Imitations of the Ancient Ballad

- "Christie's Will"
- "Thomas the Rhymer"
- "The Eve of Saint John", by the Editor
- "Lord Soulis", by J Leyden
- "The Cout of Keeldar", by John Leyden
- "Glenfinlas, or Lord Ronald's Coronach", by the Editor
- "The Mermaid", by J Leyden
- "The Lord Herries His Complaint", by Charles Kirkpatrick Sharpe
- "The Murder of Caerlaveroc", by Charles Kirkpatrick Sharpe
- "Sir Agilthorn", by M. G. Lewis
- "Rich Auld Willie's Farewell", by Anna Seward
- "Water Kelpie", by Rev. Dr. Jamieson
- "Ellandonan Castle", by Colin Mackenzie
- "Cadyow Castle", by the Editor
- "The Gray Brother" [by] Walter Scott
- "The Curse of Moy", by J. B. S. Morritt
- "War-Song of the Royal Edinburgh Light Dragoons", by the Editor
- "The Feast of Spurs", by the Rev. John Marriott
- "On a Visit Paid to the Ruins of Melrose Abbey by the Countess of Dalkeith, and Her Son, Lord Scott", by the Rev. John Marriott
- "Archie Armstrang's Aith", by the Rev. John Marriott

== Research ==
For Walter Scott, as his son-in-law J. G. Lockhart later wrote, compiling Minstrelsy of the Scottish Border was "a labour of love truly, if ever such there was". His passion for ballads went back to earliest childhood. While still an infant he had the ballad "Hardiknute" by heart, and would recite it at the top of his voice to the annoyance of all around him. As a ten-year-old he began collecting the broadsheet ballads that were still being sold on the streets, and his interest was further stimulated by his discovery, at the age of 13, of Percy's Reliques of Ancient English Poetry. "To read and to remember was in this instance the same thing", he later wrote, "and henceforth I overwhelmed my schoolfellows, and all who would hearken to me, with tragical recitations from the ballads of Bishop Percy." His memory was prodigious, and by his own account it "seldom failed to preserve most tenaciously a favourite passage of poetry, a playhouse ditty, or, above all, a Border-raid ballad". In 1792 Scott turned to field research, making an expedition into the wilds of Liddesdale, in southern Roxburghshire, and taking down the words of traditional ballads from villagers, farmers and herds wherever he could find any who still remembered them, and in the next seven years he repeated these "raids", as he called them, seven times. In late 1799, impressed by the elegant work of the Kelso printer James Ballantyne, an old schoolfellow of his, the idea occurred to him of putting together a selection of ballads to be printed by him. This would satisfy his patriotic feelings in various ways, not just displaying the typographical prowess of a little-known Border town, but also preserving the folk-poetry of his beloved Scotland for the admiration of the world at large.

== Editing ==
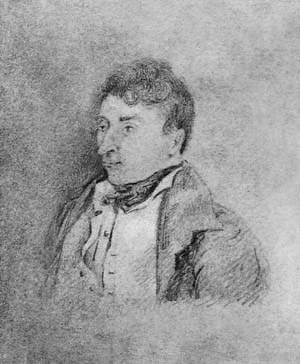
John Leyden, Scott's collaborator in the Minstrelsy

Energetic as Scott's researches had been, he gained still more from the researches of other collectors he befriended or exchanged letters with. He gained access to several manuscript collections originating from the Borders and from north-east Scotland, notably those of Mrs Brown of Falkland, David Herd and Robert Riddell. He recruited assistants from widely different strata of society, including the wealthy and learned bibliophile Richard Heber, the lawyer Robert Shortreed, the literary antiquaries Robert Jamieson and Charles Kirkpatrick Sharpe, and later the farmer William Laidlaw and the shepherd-poet James Hogg. Of these the most invaluable, more a collaborator than an assistant, was John Leyden, a brilliant young linguist and poet who has been called "the project's workhorse and its architect". There have been criticisms of Scott for exploiting his helpers and for letting only his own name appear on the title-page, but all gave their help freely and were fully acknowledged in the body of the book.

In the Minstrelsy, Scott produced an eclectic edition, combining lines and stanzas from different versions of each ballad to produce what he thought the best version from a purely literary point of view. This approach would now be considered unscholarly, but Scott wanted his book to appeal to a general reading public which had little regard either for scholarship or for ballad texts in the raw state. In his later years he changed his mind on this point, and wrote that "I think I did wrong...and that, in many respects, if I improved the poetry, I spoiled the simplicity of the old song". One aspect of his editing has proved controversial over the years. Scott denied introducing any new material of his own into the ballads to patch over corrupt lines, saying "I have made it an invariable rule to attempt no improvements upon the genuine Ballads which I have been able to recover"; and again, "I utterly disclaim the idea of writing anything that I am not ready to own to the whole world". J. G. Lockhart took his claims at face value, but later commentators, from Francis James Child onwards, took a different view, so that it became commonplace to accuse him of writing not just lines of his own but even entire stanzas. However, more recent analyses of the texts by Keith W. Harry, Marryat Ross Dobie and Charles G. Zug have largely vindicated Scott's claims, showing that he was probably responsible for nothing more than an occasional word or phrase.

The Minstrelsy began with a substantial general introduction with several appendices of documentary material, followed by the editions of the various ballads; each of these has an explanatory headnote which puts the ballad into its historical context, then the text of the ballad itself, and finally a set of explanatory notes. Originally Scott wanted to restrict himself to those ballads that celebrated the Border raids of the past, but he was drawn into including romantic ballads telling entirely unhistorical stories, and also modern imitations of the traditional ballads written by Scott and Leyden, and in later editions by Matthew Lewis, Charles Kirkpatrick Sharpe, Anna Seward and others. These three categories of ballad were clearly demarcated from each other in the Minstrelsy. For some while Scott intended to include the Middle English romance Sir Tristrem among the romantic ballads, convinced as he was that it was a Scottish production, but it proved so difficult and time-consuming to edit that he had to publish it separately in 1804, two years after the Minstrelsy had appeared. Likewise, one of his imitations of the ancient ballads expanded to such a length as he wrote it that it outgrew its intended place in the Minstrelsy and was instead published as The Lay of the Last Minstrel, laying the foundation of Scott's tremendous fame as an original poet.

== Publication ==
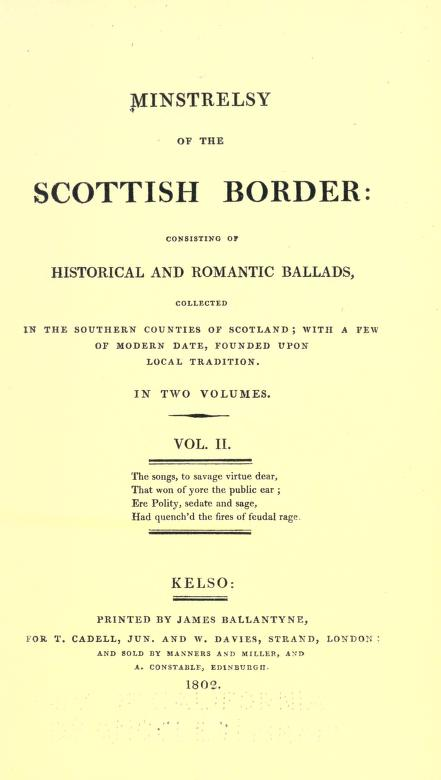
The title-page of volume 2 of the first edition

The first edition, printed by James Ballantyne and published by Cadell and Davies, appeared in two volumes in January 1802. The print-run was 800 copies and the price for most copies 18 shillings. It included 53 ballads. That edition took only six months to sell out, but a second one, with additions to all three categories bringing it up to 87 ballads, was published in three volumes by Longman and Rees in May 1803, priced at £1 11s. 6d. This time there were 1000 copies of the first two volumes, and 1500 of the third volume, containing the "Imitations of Ancient Ballads". A third edition was published in 1806 and a fourth in 1810, each adding a few more ballads. The fifth edition, in 1812, added one more, bringing the final tally to 96 ballads, of which 43 had never before appeared in print. A second issue of this edition, published in 1830, added two substantial new essays by Scott. In 1833, following Scott's death, Lockhart produced another edition which included the music of nine of the ballads, making it the first collection to do such a thing. In 1837, he reported that there had been numerous American editions. T. F. Henderson's edition, first published in 1902, remained the reference edition of this work until the appearance in 2017 of Edinburgh University Press's three-volume Minstrelsy of the Scottish Border, edited by Sigrid Rieuwerts.

== Reception ==
James Hogg's mother Margaret was outraged by the Minstrelsy, and is said to have told him that the ballads she had recited for him "war made for singing an' no for reading; but ye hae broken the charm now, an' they'll never be sung mair". But others saw the book very differently. Scott received congratulatory letters from delighted literary figures such as George Ellis, Anna Seward, and George Chalmers, and even from the notoriously prickly antiquaries John Pinkerton and Joseph Ritson. Reviews of the Minstrelsy were also in general enthusiastic. The Scots Magazine said that it would "attract the attention of men of literature, not only in Scotland, but in every country which has preserved a taste for poetical antiquities, and popular poetry". It admired the notes, and ranked the work alongside Percy's Reliques. The British Critic praised the "taste and learning" displayed in this "elegant collection". The Edinburgh Review thought the Minstrelsy "highly interesting and important to literature", and found much to praise in Scott's notes, not to mention Ballantyne's printing. Poetical merit, it judged, "is here attained in a very eminent degree", while warning that "We are not...to view these poems as...highly-polished and elaborate specimens of art; but as exhibiting the true sparks and flashes of individual nature". Only the critic in the Monthly Review dissented. He had little time for rude and unpolished Scottish ballads, protested that "the taste of the age calls for models more correct and refined", and lamented that "it was decreed that Mr. Scott should publish these volumes, and that Reviewers should be doomed to read them". But even he admired the section of Imitations, praised the "fidelity, taste and learning" displayed in the editing, and admitted that the notes throw some light on the country's history.

For many later readers, as Andrew Lang wrote, "Scott composed 'a standard text', now the classical text, of the ballads which he published". Comparisons are often made with Percy's Reliques. The Scott scholar Jane Millgate thought the Minstrelsy had a unity and coherence not found there, but A. N. Wilson nevertheless found himself preferring the Reliques: "[I]n terms of range, [Scott] surpassed Bishop Percy, but not in that nebulous, odd art which can make an anthology a companion for life. We still keep Percy's Reliques, not Scott's Minstrelsy, on the bedside table." In the 20th century the Minstrelsy had a controversial reputation among academic writers on the folk tradition because of its failure to meet modern standards of scholarship, but they have nevertheless acknowledged the ability of Scott's editorial method to capture something of the essence of the Scottish ballad. Jane Millgate admired "his ability not only to draw on the skills of very different men and organize the most diverse kinds of material but also to appear, almost simultaneously, in several guises – as antiquarian, scholar, historian, critic, and poet". T. F. Henderson called it "one of the great monuments of Scottish literature", and the literary historian David Hewitt has called it "the most exciting collection of ballads ever to appear".

== Influence ==
Minstrelsy of the Scottish Border exercised a powerful influence on both British and European literature, not least on Scott himself. His first efforts as a writer had been translations of German Sturm und Drang poems, together with one or two original pieces in the same lurid manner. His experience as a ballad-editor did a great deal towards purifying his taste and turning him towards a more simple and natural style. His experience of working with both the English and Scots languages, with narrative verse and critical and historiographical prose, and integrating them together, was to prove formative on his original works, steeped as they are both in the spirit of the Scottish oral tradition and in his own experience of antiquarian commentary on it. It also furnished him with abundant subject-matter, and indeed Lockhart claimed that "In the text and notes of this early publication, we can now trace the primary incident, or broad outline of almost every romance, whether in verse or in prose" of his career as a creative writer. It has been shown that his novel Old Mortality, for example, derives its setting and much of its action, personnel, and motivation from two Minstrelsy ballads, "The Battle of Loudon Hill" and "The Battle of Bothwell Bridge". As the scholar H. J. C. Grierson wrote, the Minstrelsy was "the tap-root of Scott's later work as a poet and novelist".

With the publication of the Minstrelsy, the ballad finally became a fashionable and respectable form, increasingly displacing the Burnsian type of lyric poem in literary favour. James Hogg was one of those who responded to this shifting of the market by trying to surpass the imitations of ancient ballads in its third volume. One of the consequences of Scott's use of the phrase Scottish Border in his title, in spite of the fact that many of his ballads came from north-east Scotland, was to popularize the still-current fallacy that the Borders rather than the north-east were the richest source of Scottish ballads. Most ballad editors of the 19th century and later, such as William Motherwell and Francis James Child, practised strict fidelity to one source, but Scott's example of preferring collation was followed by some of his successors, and can be seen in William Allingham's Ballad Book, Arthur Quiller-Couch's Oxford Book of Ballads, and Robert Graves's The English Ballad and English and Scottish Ballads.

Across Europe the publication of the Minstrelsy was an inspiration to literary nationalists. It was translated into French, Danish and Swedish, and individual ballads from it into Czech and Hungarian. There were two German translations of the Minstrelsy: one by Henriette Schubart, and another by Elise von Hohenhausen, Willibald Alexis and Wilhelm von Lüdemann. Wilhelm Grimm rendered two of its ballads into German, Theodor Fontane another, and the Minstrelsy profoundly influenced Fontane's own ballads. Most importantly, perhaps, the publication of the Minstrelsy was the main impulse that led Clemens Brentano and Achim von Arnim to produce their famous collection of German folk-poems and legends, Des Knaben Wunderhorn, itself the inspiration for the collections of other folklorists and the source of musical settings by some of the greatest composers of the 19th century.
