= Walter of Aquitaine =

Legendary king of the Visigoths

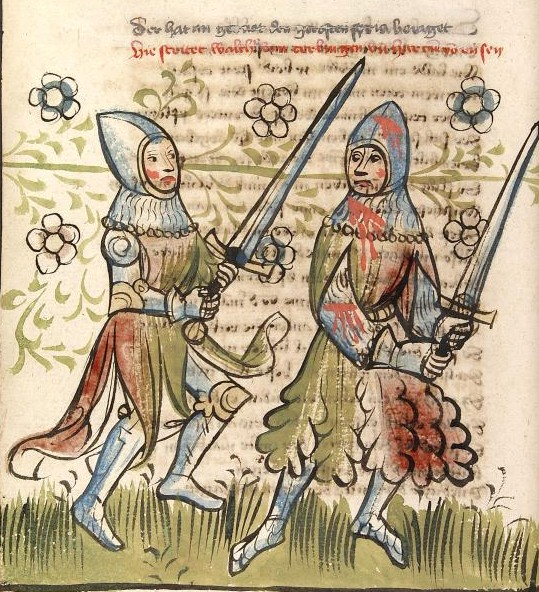
Walter fighting.

Walter or Walther of Aquitaine is a king of the Visigoths in Germanic heroic legend.

== Epic poetry ==
Walter figures in several epic poems and narratives dealing with Germanic heroic legend in medieval languages:

- Waldere, a fragment of an Old English epic of which just over sixty lines survive.
- Waltharius, a 10th-century Latin epic written by the monk Ekkehard I of St Gall.
- Chronicon Novaliciense ("Chronicle of Novalesa"), a Latin prose chronicle composed c.1060, at Novalesa Abbey: Waltarius figures in chapters 7-13.
- Nibelungenlied, a Middle High German epic in which Walter is mentioned briefly.
- Walther, a lost Middle High German epic of which several short fragments from different redactions are known. In these the hero is sometimes called "Walther von Kärlingen".
- The Rosengarten zu Worms, where Walter appears among the Burgundian champions of Kriemhilt's rose garden. He refuses to fight his kinsman Dietleib.
- Biterolf und Dietleib, an epic tale about Walter's brother Biterolf and his nephew Dietleib, who enter the service of Etzel. Walter plays a supporting role.
- Þiðrekssaga, which tells the stories of Walter briefly in chapters 241-244.
- Chronicon Poloniae ("Chronicle of Poland") by Boguchwał, which outlines the story of Walter as a Polish count, Wdaly Walczerz, under the year 1135.

The most complete poem specifically about Walter is Waltharius, in which Walter fights single-handedly against the Burgundian king Gunther and his retinue, killing all attackers except for Gunther and Hagen. In later literature, Walter figures in Scheffel's novel Ekkehard (1855).

Walter is not a historical king, but the historical nucleus of his legend lies in the 5th century (the reign of the Balti dynasty), after king Wallia established a Visigothic kingdom in Aquitaine in 417, clashing with the Vandals under king Gunderic. The Burgundians became neighbours of the Visigoths after being resettled to Savoy by Flavius Aëtius in 443 during the rule of Gunderic of Burgundy.

== See also ==
- Château du Wasigenstein
