= Rat-catcher (disambiguation) =

A rat-catcher is profession centred on catching rats as a form of pest control.

Rat-catcher or ratcatcher might also refer to:

== Arts and entertainment ==
- Ratcatcher (comics), a DC Comics supervillain character
- Ratcatcher (film), a 1999 British drama film directed by Lynne Ramsay
- Ratcatcher, motorcycle of animated television series character Darkwing Duck
- The Ratcatcher: A Lyrical Satire, a poem by Marina Tsvetaeva released in 1925–26
- "The Ratcatcher", a Robert Browning poem collected in his Dramatic Lyrics (1842)
- "The Ratcatcher", a short story by Roald Dahl collected in Someone Like You (short story collection) (1953)
- The Rat Catchers, 1960s British television series
- Der Rattenfänger von Hameln, an opera by Viktor Nessler

== Other uses ==
- Ratcatcher, colloquial name for a populist
- Ratcatcher (attire), clothing worn by British fox hunters
- Ratcatcher, name used in Great Britain to market the Crosman 2250 CO_{2} carbine

== See also ==
- Pied Piper of Hamelin
