= Waltharius =

Latin epic poem

Waltharius is a Latin epic poem founded on German popular tradition relating the exploits of the Visigothic hero Walter of Aquitaine. While its subject matter is taken from early medieval Germanic legend, the epic stands firmly in the Latin literary tradition in terms of its form and the stylistic devices used. Thus, its 1456 verses are written in dactylic hexameter (the traditional meter of Latin epic poetry) and the poem includes copious references to (and phrases borrowed from) various Latin epics of antiquity, especially Vergil's Aeneid.

== History ==
Our knowledge of the author, Ekkehard, a monk of St. Gall, is due to a later Ekkehard, known as Ekkehard IV (died 1060), who gives some account of him in the Casus Sancti Galli (cap. 80). Ekkehard IV's account is much discussed among scholars and seems to be confirmed by another monk of St. Gall, Herimannus, the author of the later (ca 1075) life of St Wiborada of St Gall where he cites verse 51 of the Waltharius. According to Ekkehard IV, the poem was written by the earlier Ekkehard, generally distinguished as Ekkehard I, for his master Geraldus in his schooldays. This would date the poem no later than 920, since he was probably no longer young when he became deacon (in charge of ten monks) in 957. He died in 973.

Waltharius was dedicated by Geraldus to Erchanbald, bishop of Strasbourg (fl. 965–991), but manuscripts of it were in circulation before that time. Ekkehard IV stated that he corrected the Latin of the poem, the Germanisms of which offended his patron Aribo, archbishop of Mainz. The poem was probably based on epic songs now lost, so that if the author was still in his teens when he wrote it he must have possessed considerable and precocious powers.

== Synopsis ==
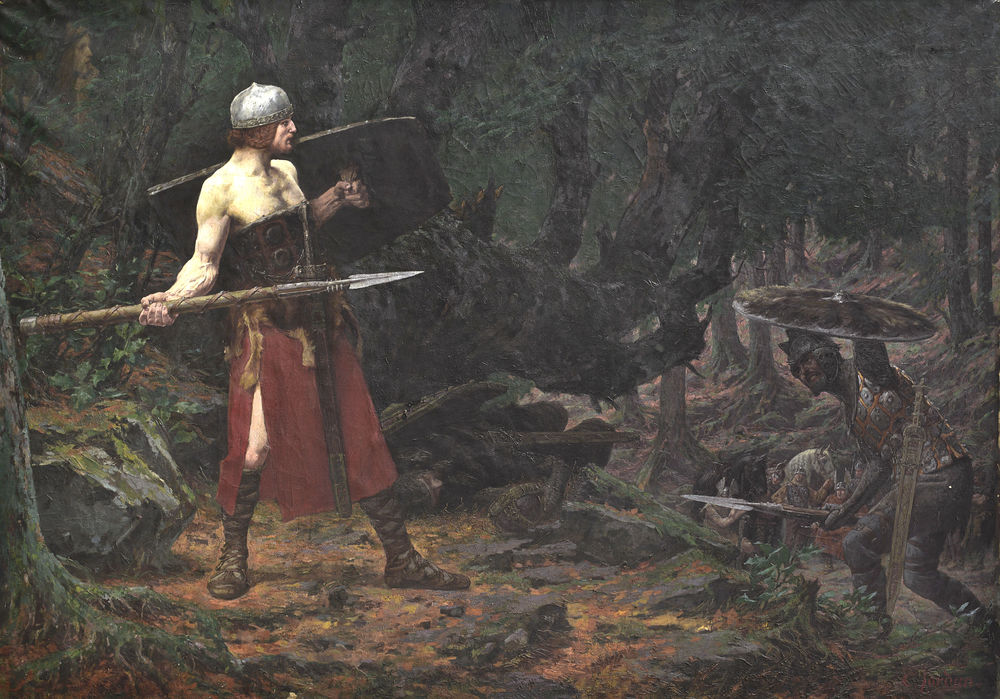
Waltharius, painting by Karl (or Carl) Jordan, 1904 (Strasbourg Museum of Modern and Contemporary Art)

Waltharius was the son of Alphere, ruler of Aquitaine, which in the 5th century, when the legend developed, was the centre of the Visigothic kingdom of Toulouse. When Attila invaded the west, the western princes are represented as making no resistance. They purchased peace by offering tribute and hostages. King Gibicho, here described as a Frankish king, gave Hagano as a hostage (of Trojan race, but not, as in the Nibelungenlied, a kinsman of the royal house) in place of his infant son Guntharius; the Burgundian king Herirīcus, his daughter Hiltgunt; and Alphere, his son Waltharius.

Hagano and Waltharius became brothers in arms, fighting at the head of Attila's armies, while Hiltgunt was put in charge of the queen's treasure. Presently Guntharius succeeded his father and refused to pay tribute to the Huns, whereupon Hagano fled from Attila's court. Waltharius and Hiltgunt, who had been betrothed in childhood, also made good their escape during a drunken feast of the Huns, taking with them a great treasure. They were recognized at Worms, however, where the treasure excited the cupidity of Guntharius. Taking with him twelve knights, among them the reluctant Hagano, he pursued them, and overtook them at the Wasgenstein in the Vosges mountains (Vosagus). Waltharius, mentioned as being armed in fine armor made by the legendary smith Wieland, engaged the Nibelungen knights one at a time, until all were slain but Hagano. The latter held aloof from the battle due to his vows of friendship with Waltharius, and was only persuaded by Guntharius to attack his comrade due to Waltharius' killing of some of family members. So Hagano and Guntharius devised a plan to wait until the second day, when they lured Waltharius from the strong position of the day before and attacked him together. All three were incapacitated, but their wounds were bound up by Hiltgunt and they separated as friends.

== Commentary ==
The essential part of this story is the series of single combats. The occasional incoherences of the tale make it probable that many changes have been introduced in the legend. The Þiðrekssaga (chaps. 241–244) makes the story more probable by representing the pursuers as Huns. There is reason to believe that Hagano was originally the father of Hiltgunt, and that the tale was a variant of the saga of Hild as told in the Skáldskaparmál. Hildr, daughter of King Hǫgni, was carried off by Heðinn, son of Hjarrandi (A.S. Heorrenda). The fight between the forces of father and lover only ceased at sundown, to be renewed on the morrow, since each evening Hildr raised the dead by her incantations. This has been interpreted as a form of the old myth of the daily recurring struggle between light and darkness. The songs sung by Hiltgunt in Waltharius during her night watches were probably incantations, a view strengthened by the fact that in a Polish version the glance of Helgunda is said to have inspired the combatants with new strength. Hiltgunt has retained nothing of Hild's fierceness, but the fragment of the Anglo-Saxon Waldere shows more of the original spirit. In Waltharius Hiltgunt advises Waltharius to fly; in Waldere she urges him to the combat.

One of the most extensive studies of the poem is by Dennis M. Kratz, who argues that the poem makes sophisticated use of allusions to its Classical sources to satirise the heroic ethics of its protagonists. Leonard Neidorf noted several common motifs between the poem and the later Solomon and Marcolf, such as intoxication as an escape ruse, one man fighting twelve attackers, and gratuitous beheadings. Neidorf posited that, rather than the author of Solomon and Marcolf being directly influenced by Waltharius, the similarities stem from a common derivation from the Germanic bridal-quest narrative tradition.

== Manuscripts ==
- Gemblours MS (Brussels)
- Hirschau MS (Karlsruhe)
- Regensburg MS (Stuttgart)
- Epternach MS (Paris)
- Salzburg MS (Vienna)
- Metlach MS (Trier)
- Engelberg fragment

There are two fragments of a 9th-century Old English version, known as Waldere, consisting of 15 lines each, discovered in 1860, edited by George Stephens.

== Editions and translations ==
Waltharius was first edited by F. Ch. J. Fischer (Leipzig, 1780) and Fr. Molter (Karlsruhe). Later and more scholarly editions are by: Jacob Grimm Lateinische Gedichte des Mittelalters (Göttingen, 1838); R. Peiper (Berlin, 1873); V. Scheffel, A. Holder (Stuttgart, 1874), Marion Dexter Learned (Baltimore, 1892, the entire corpus of texts concerning the Saga of Walther of Aquitaine), and Karl Strecker (Weimar, 1951).

Dennis Kratz produced an English edition and translation under the title, Waltharius, and Ruodlieb, ed. and trans. by Dennis M. Kratz, The Garland Library of Medieval Literature, Series A, 13 (New York: Garland, 1984). More recently, the Dallas Medieval Texts and Translations series has published a new Latin text and English translation, authored by Abram Ring: Waltharius. Edition, Translation, and Introduction by Abram Ring, Dallas Medieval Texts and Translations 22 (Louvain: Peeters, 2016).

An edition and translation of the text into English was done by Leonard Neidorf (ed.) and Brian Murdoch (trans.), Waltharius: The Latin Epic of Walther of Aquitaine (London: Uppsala Books, 2025).

Another English translation is Brian Murdoch's, Walthari: A Verse Translation of the Medieval Latin Waltharius, Scottish Papers in Germanic Studies, 9 (Glasgow, 1989). There are German translations by F. Linnig (Paderborn, 1885), H. Althof (Leipzig, 1896), and Karl Langosch (Darmstadt, 1967).

== Influence ==
See also Scheffel's novel Ekkehard (Stuttgart, 1887); B. Symons, Deutsche Heldensage (Strassburg, 1905).

With Waltharius compare the Scottish ballads of "Earl Brand" and "Erlinton" (F.J. Child's English and Scottish Popular Ballads, i. 88 seq.).
