= Kinmont Willie =

Scottish ballad

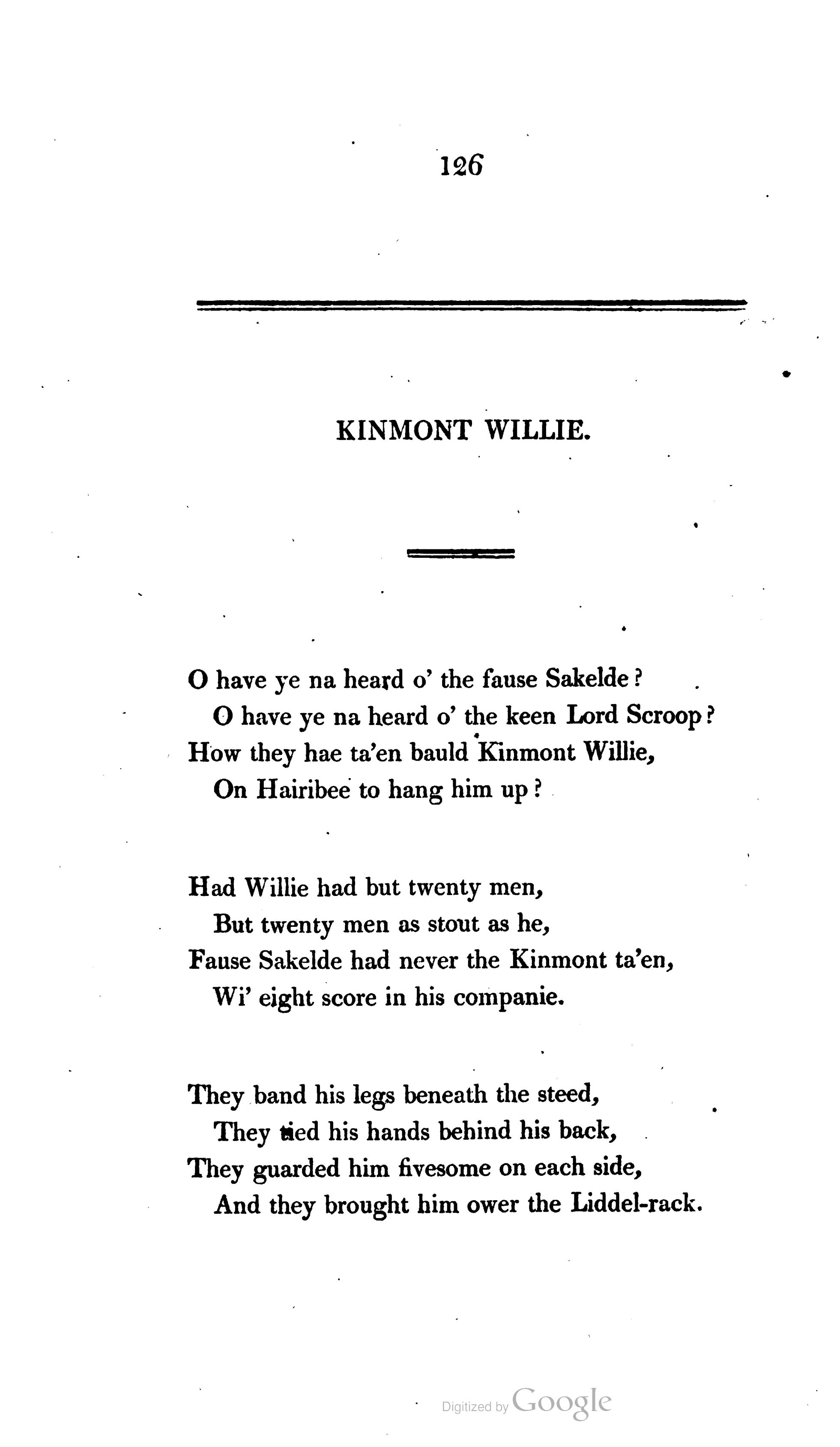
First page of Kinmont Willie in Scott's Minstrelsy of the Scottish Border.

"Kinmont Willie" or "Kinmount Willie" is a ballad from the English-Scottish border country, catalogued as Child ballad 186 (Roud 4013). It recounts the rescue of William Armstrong of Kinmont from an English prison. It is one of several border ballads dealing with the exploits of the Armstrongs.

"Kinmont Willie" is one of three border ballads that recount a raid to break someone out of prison, the others being Jock o' the Side and Archie o' Cawfield. It shares several motifs with these other prison-break ballads, including the raiders' demonstration of physical strength in carrying the prisoner with leg irons still attached, and the raiding party crossing a stream and turning to mock their pursuers from the far bank.

Unlike many ballads it is composed in tetrameter rather than traditional ballad metre. First published by Walter Scott in 1802, it has often been suspected of being Scott's own work.

== Synopsis ==
The ballad is based on a true story which took place in 1596. William Armstrong of Kinmont, a notorious Border reiver, was seized by the English authorities on a day of truce, in breach of agreements between Scotland and England. The Scottish Warden of the West March, Walter Scott, the "Bold Buccleuch", sprung him from Carlisle Castle, much to the embarrassment of Scrope, the English Warden. Taking the guards by surprise, the rescuers escaped back across the River Eden with Armstrong.

== Origins ==
"Kinmont Willie" first appeared in print in 1802, in the first edition of Walter Scott's Minstrelsy of the Scottish Border. Its authenticity has frequently been questioned. Francis Child suspected it of having been heavily influenced, or possibly invented, by Scott himself. Scott himself acknowledged relying heavily on a 1688 chronicle by Walter Scot of Satchells, A true history of the several honourable families of the right honourable name of Scot, and to making "conjectural emendations" to the ballad so that the story would be "intelligible".

The origins of the ballad were the subject of a lengthy scholarly dispute between Fitzwilliam Elliot and Andrew Lang, in which Lang argued that there was an underlying traditional ballad on which Scott's text and likely also Satchell's was based, and Elliot argued that the ballad was entirely Scott's invention. Lang agreed, however, that much of the ballad was Scott's own work. In his final paper on the subject, Lang summarized the dispute:

Lastly, Kinmont Willie, and Scott's share in it, is matter of presumption, not of proof. He had been in quest of the ballad, as we know from his list of desiderata; he says that what he got was "mangled" by reciters, and that, in what he got, one river was mentioned where topography requires another. He also admits that, in the three ballads of rescues, he placed passages where they had most poetical appropriateness. My arguments to show that Satchells had memory of a Kinmont ballad will doubtless appeal with more or less success, or with none, to different students. That an indefinite quantity of the ballad, and improvements on the rest, are Scott's, I cannot doubt, from evidence of style.

== Recordings ==
The ballad was recorded by the marine biologist Max Dunbar in 1956 for the Smithsonian Folkways album Songs and Ballads of the Scottish Wars, 1290-1745. Subsequent recordings were made by other performers in 1998 and 2000.
