= Ekkehard II =

Ekkehard II (died 23 April 990), called Palatinus ("the Courtier"), was a monk of the Abbey of Saint Gall who became known for his sequence poetry.

== Life ==
Ekkehard was probably born in the Saint Gall area; he and his cousin Ekkehard III were nephews of Ekkehard I (Ekkehardus Decanus; 910–973), dean at the abbey and presumed author of the Waltharius poem. Ekkehard II was educated by his uncle and the monk Geraldus, who educated also his other nephews, Notker Physicus and Burkard, later abbot of the monastery. Ekkehard II likewise became a teacher at the monastery school. A number of his pupils joined the order; others became bishops.

About 973 Dowager Duchess Hadwig of Swabia, the widow of Duke Burchard III called Ekkehard II to her seat at Hohentwiel Castle. Hadwig, a member of the Imperial Ottonian dynasty, was wont occasionally to visit St. Gall, and eventually asked for and obtained the services of Ekkehard as her tutor in the reading of the Latin classics. Nevertheless, he continued to render great services to his monastery, especially on the occasion of the differences between Saint Gall and the nearby Reichenau Monastery under Abbott Ruodmann; in many other ways also Ekkehard proved himself useful to the monks by the influence he had obtained as tutor of the duchess.

Ekkehard, erudite and eloquent, also socialised at the court of Emperor Otto I. Later he became provost of Mainz Cathedral, where he died in 990. He was buried in the church of St. Alban, outside the city gates. Ekkehard was the author of various ecclesiastical hymns, known as sequences, all of which are lost, except one (Summis conatibus nunc) in honour of Saint Desiderius. The attribution of several other works is uncertain.

== Reception ==
Ekkehard's life was perpetuated by the Saint Gall monk Ekkehard IV, when he continued the Casus Sancti Galli chronicles begun by Ratpert of St. Gallen. His records were the basis for the 1855 historic novel Ekkehard by Joseph Victor von Scheffel, which became hugely successful. Johann Joseph Abert's 1878 opera Ekkehard is based on Scheffel's book. A German TV miniseries on Ekkehard's life was produced in 1989–90.

== Sources ==
- Herbermann, Charles, ed. (1913). "Ekkehard". Catholic Encyclopedia. New York: Robert Appleton Company.
