= Bad Säckingen =

- Town
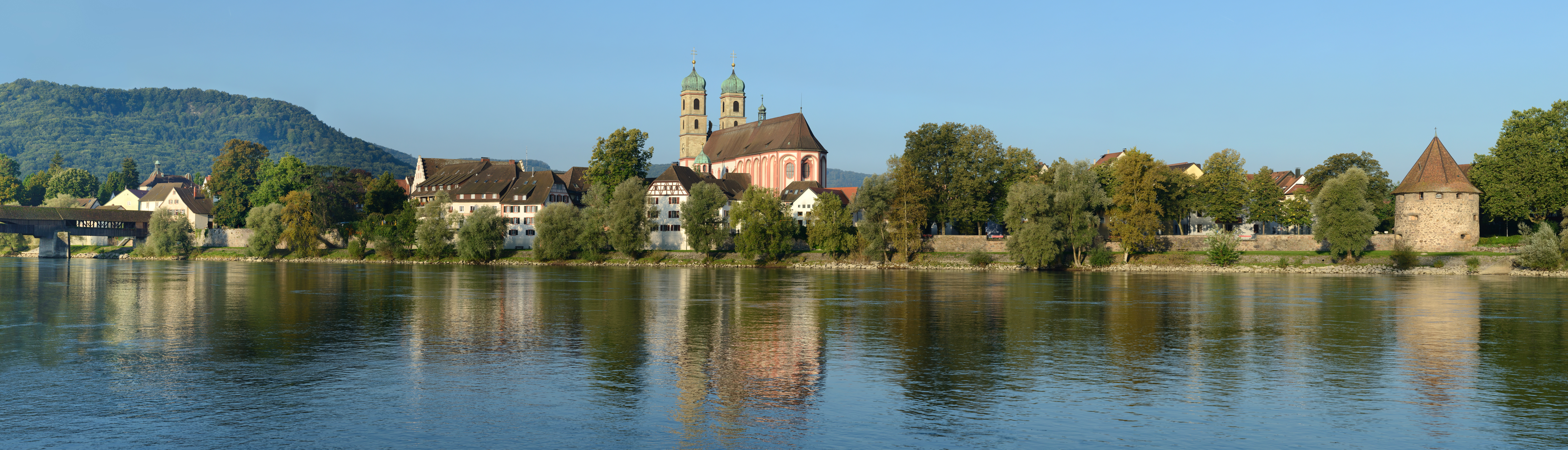
- Bad Säckingen; panorama from Swiss border

- Coat of arms

- Location of Bad Säckingen within Waldshut district
- Interactive map of Bad Säckingen
- Location within Germany Location within Baden-Württemberg
- Coordinates: 47°33′N 7°57′E
- Country: Germany
- State: Baden-Württemberg
- Admin. region: Freiburg
- District: Waldshut

Government
  - Mayor (2019–27): Alexander Guhl (SPD)

Area
  - Total: 25.34 km^{2} (9.78 sq mi)
- Elevation: 291 m (955 ft)

Population (2025-12-31)
  - Total: 17,924
  - Density: 707.3/km^{2} (1,832/sq mi)
- Time zone: UTC+01:00 (CET)
  - Summer (DST): UTC+02:00 (CEST)
- Postal codes: 79701–79713
- Dialling codes: 07761
- Vehicle registration: SÄK
- Website: http://www.bad-saeckingen.de/

Bad Säckingen (German pronunciation: [baːt ˈzɛkɪŋən]; High Alemannic: Bad Säckinge) is a rural town in the administrative district of Waldshut in the state of Baden-Württemberg in Germany. It is famous as the "Trumpeter's City" because of the book Der Trompeter von Säckingen ("The Trumpeter of Säckingen"), a famous 19th-century novel by German author Joseph Victor von Scheffel.

== Geography ==
Bad Säckingen is located in the very southwest of Germany on the High Rhine next to the Swiss border. The city lies on the southern edge of the Hotzenwald, which is the southern foothills of the Black Forest.

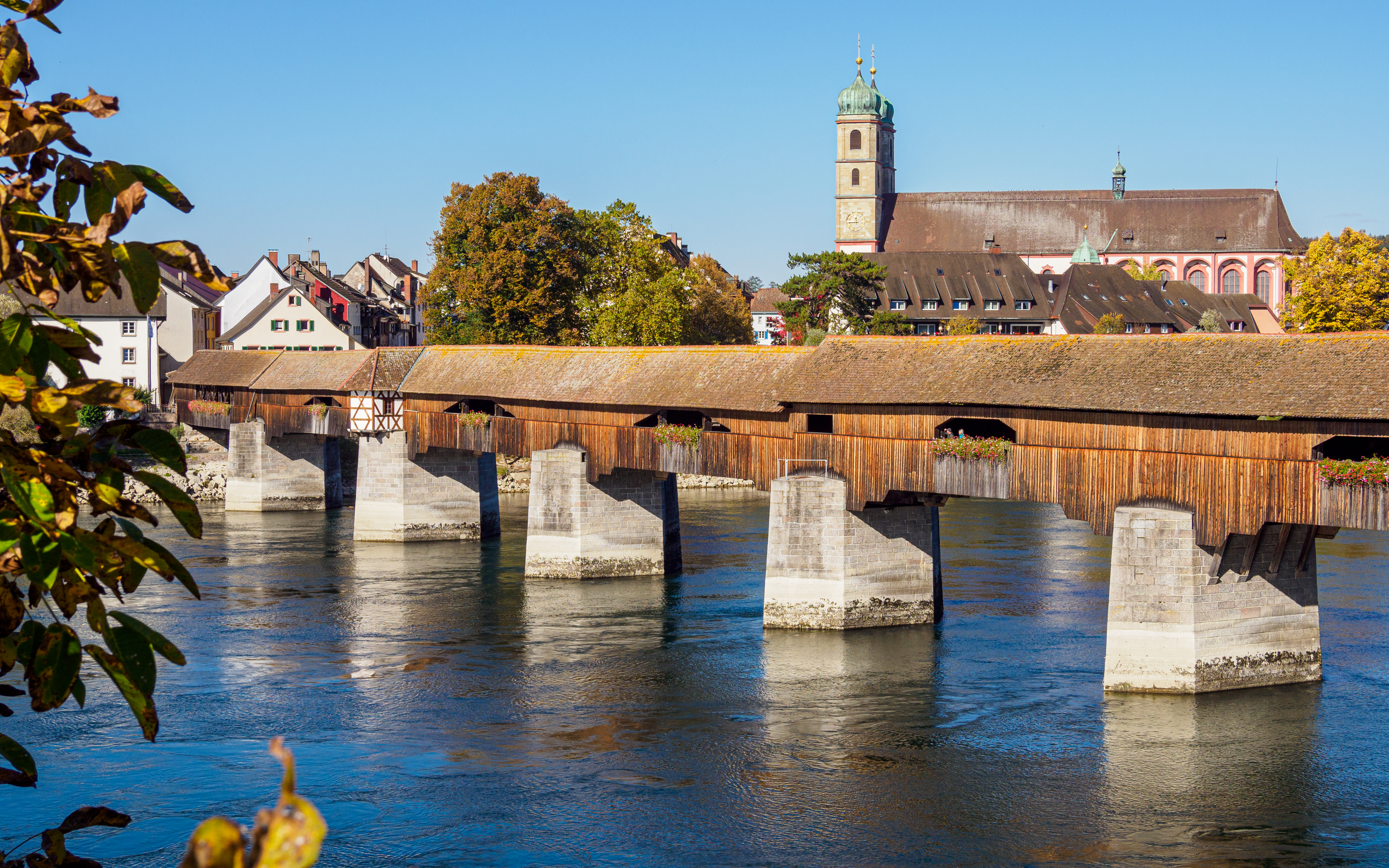
Wooden bridge between Säckingen and Stein and St. Fridolin's Cathedral

=== Constitutuent communities ===
The town of Bad Säckingen consists of the following former municipalities:

- Harpolingen with the farms Lochmühle and Rüttehof and the houses Holdmatt
- Rippolingen with the Flut farmstead and the Santihof houses
- Säckingen with the district of Obersäckingen and the houses Am Bergsee
- Wallbach

=== Nearby places ===
- Close (<15 km): Wallbach, Wehr (Baden), Murg am Hochrhein, Laufenburg (Baden), Stein AG, Rheinfelden (Schweiz), Rheinfelden (Baden), Rickenbach (Hotzenwald)
- Further away (>15 km): Waldshut-Tiengen, Schopfheim, Lörrach, Basel, Brugg AG, Aarau AG, Zürich, Schaffhausen SH, St. Blasien, Todtmoos, Freiburg i.Br., Konstanz.

== Origin of the name ==
Säckingen (since 1978 Bad Säckingen, first mentioned in a document in 878 as Seckinga) is traditionally considered to be the foundation of an Alemanni group called Secco. However, the name of the city most likely originated from the Germanization of a Roman place name (Sanctio) (similar to Aachen, Baden-Baden and others), possibly from the name of the Diocletian province Maxima Sequanorum, founded in 297 AD.

In the Latin text of Fridolinsvita (970), Säckingen is called Secanis and Seconis (pronunciation a>o) and in 1207 also Seconia. Seconis is to be interpreted as a local case of Seconia, which can be easily derived from Sequaniacum (= sanctuary of Sequana). According to the belief of the Celts, the goddess of springs, the art of healing and health revealed herself in the swampy soil of the saline thermal baths of Säckingen (seik – "dripping flow", Sequana – "daughter of the springs").

The author of Fridolinsvita based himself on a concept that had probably originated as early as the 8th century and had preferred the pre-Alemannic place name. However, the emerging tax cadastre of the Franks could not do without Seckinga.

In the documents of the 13th century, the Celto-Roman place name was used again as a sign of erudition: 1275 Sigillum Civium Seconiensium = seal of the citizens of the city of Seconis (Seconiis = "at the Temple of Seconia").

== History ==
The history of the city dates back to the early 6th Century, when Saint Fridolin founded Säckingen Abbey and a church. Around 1200 most of the city was destroyed in a huge fire. Afterwards, construction began in the middle of the town on a Gothic cathedral, called the Fridolinsmünster, which can still be visited today.

In the closing stages of the 1672–1678 Franco-Dutch War, the town was severely damaged by French soldiers commanded by the Comte de Choiseul, following their victory over an Imperial force at Rheinfelden on 7 July 1678.

After the Second World War the city was under control of France from 1945-1952. The city was financially helped by the Swiss Fricktal to get over the financial struggles after the war.

== Transport ==
The town has a railway station that provide trainlinks to other parts of Germany and Switzerland. Holzbrücke Bad Säckingen is a covered bridge which connects with the village of Stein in Switzerland. The nearest airports to Bad Säckingen are EuroAirport Basel Mulhouse Freiburg, located 45 km (28 mi) west and Zurich Airport, located 64 km (40 mi) south east of Bad Säckingen.

== Notable people ==
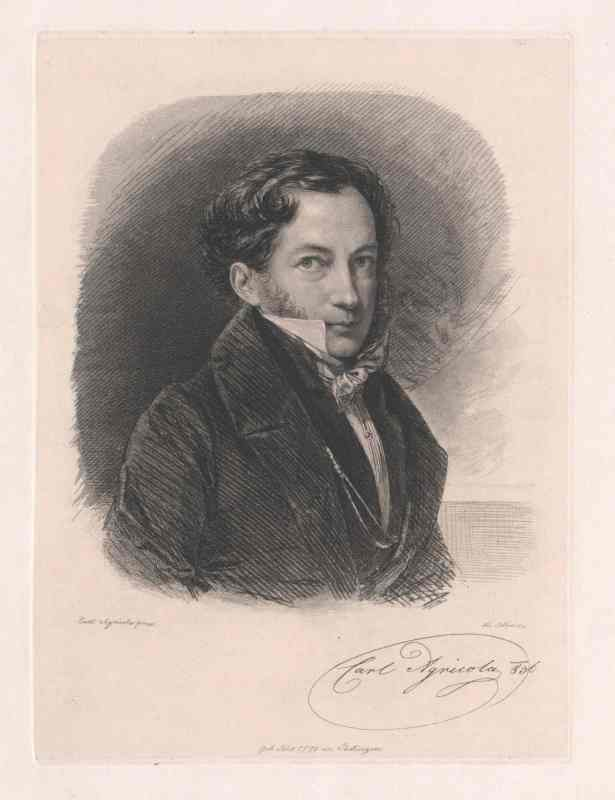
Karl Agricola, before 1834

- Wibrandis Rosenblatt (1504-1564), successively the wife of three religious reformers Johannes Oecolampadius, Wolfgang Capito and Martin Bucer
- Jacob Keller (1568–1631), German Jesuit theologian, author, and religious instructor.
- Karl Agricola (1779-1852), engraver and painter of portrait miniatures.
- Joseph Victor von Scheffel (1826-1886), author of Der Trompeter von Säckingen and Ekkehard,
- Axel Neumann, (DE Wiki) (born 1966), actor
- Baki Davrak (born 1971), Turkish-German actor
- Thorsten Frei (born 1973), German politician
- Stefanie Böhler (born 1981), cross-country skier, team medalist at the 2006 & 2014 Winter Olympics
- Manuel Metzger (born 1986), racing driver

== Twin towns ==
- Sanary-sur-Mer, France (1973)
- Purkersdorf, Austria (1973)
- Nagai, Yamagata, Japan (1983)
- Santeramo, Italy (1983)
- Näfels, Switzerland (1988)
