= Louis Schindelmeisser =

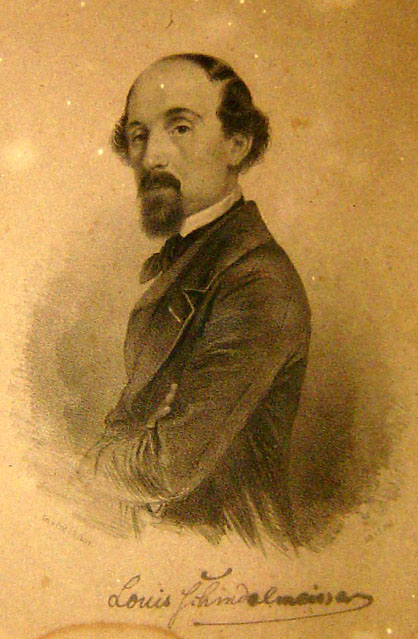
Louis Schindelmeisser.

Louis (Ludwig) Alexander Balthasar Schindelmeisser (8 December 1811 - 30 March 1864) was a nineteenth-century German clarinetist, conductor and composer. He was born Königsberg, Prussia, and studied in Berlin and Leipzig. He was an early and enthusiastic partisan of Richard Wagner, arranging his first performances in Wiesbaden and Darmstadt of Tannhäuser, of which he conducted the premiere, Rienzi and Lohengrin.

== Life ==
Schindelmeisser attended High School for music in Berlin where he studied clarinet under the guidance of French virtuoso J. M. Hostié who had moved to Berlin in 1824. However, it is possible that he taught him earlier in Königsberg since Hostié had settled there already in 1812. He died in Darmstadt.

His own operas were in the tradition of von Weber and Spohr and "he kept the lyrical and dramatic components in balance". Of note is his Sinfonia Concertante Op. 2 for four clarinets and orchestra composed in 1833, believed to be the only one of its kind, (Note: Liner notes of the Koch Schwann CD 3-1125-2 H1 by Dieter Klöcker and Gernot Schmallfuß) Georg Druschetzky wrote a piece for three clarinets and orchestra.

== Compositions ==
=== Music for winds ===
- Ouvertüre zu dem Trauerspiel "Uriel Acosta" für Harmoniemusik in E-flat major.
- Sinfonia Concertante op.2 for 4 clarinets
- Concertino in E flat dedicated to J. M. Hostié.

=== Operas and Stageworks ===
- Peter von Szapáry, premiered on 8 August 1839 in Pest.
- Malwina (Librettist: Uffer). Romantic Opera in 4 Acts premiered on 20 December 1841 in Pest.
- Der Rächer (Librettist: Otto Prechtler after Corneille's Le Cid). Heroic-romantic Opera in 4 Acts premiered on 4 April 1846 in Pest.
- Diavolina (Librettist: Giovanni Ambrogio Migliavacca). Ballet in 4 acts (c. 1860 Darmstadt).
- Melusine (Librettist: Ernst Pasqué). Romantic Opera in 5 Acts, premiered on 29 December 1861 in Darmstadt.
- Mathilde (premiere not known)
- Die zehn glücklichen Tage (premiere not known)
