= Niedersteinbach =

- Commune
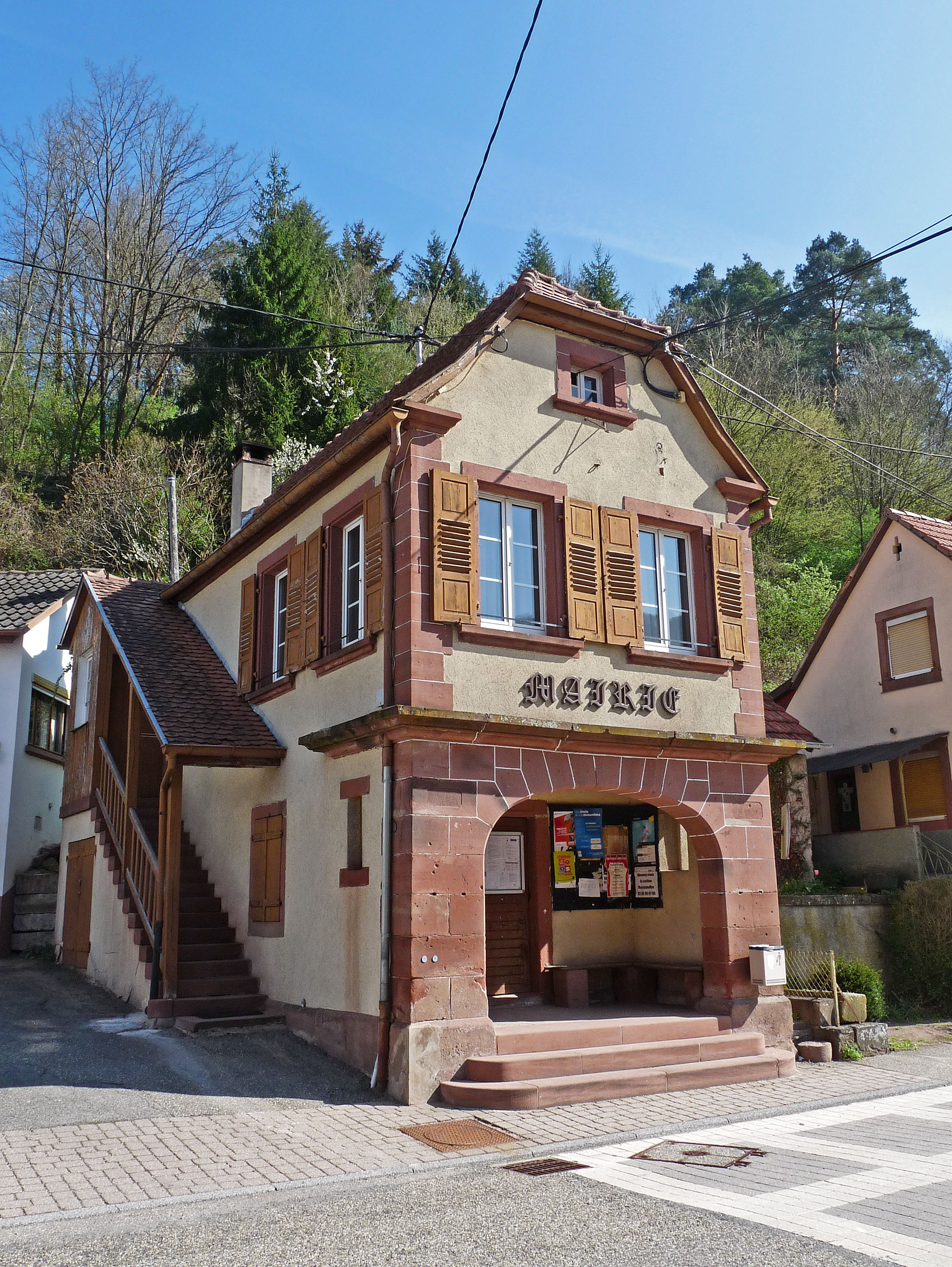
- The town hall in Niedersteinbach

- Coat of arms
- Location of Niedersteinbach
- Location within France Location within Grand Est
- Coordinates: 49°01′50″N 7°42′45″E
- Country: France
- Region: Grand Est
- Department: Bas-Rhin
- Arrondissement: Haguenau-Wissembourg
- Canton: Reichshoffen

Government
  - Mayor (2020–2026): Christophe Schertz
- Area^{1}: 8.3 km^{2} (3.2 sq mi)
- Highest elevation: 510 m (1,670 ft)
- Lowest elevation: 212 m (696 ft)
- Population (2023): 124
  - Density: 15/km^{2} (39/sq mi)
- Time zone: UTC+01:00 (CET)
  - Summer (DST): UTC+02:00 (CEST)
- INSEE/Postal code: 67334 /67510
- ^{1} French Land Register data, which excludes lakes, ponds, glaciers > 1 km^{2} (0.386 sq mi or 247 acres) and river estuaries.

Niedersteinbach is a commune in the Bas-Rhin département in Grand Est in north-eastern France.

== Sites and monuments ==
- Château du Wasigenstein - 13th-century castle

== See also ==
- Communes of the Bas-Rhin department
