= Jacob Keller =

German Jesuit theologian, author and religious instructor

Jacob Keller (1568 – 23 February 1631) was a German Jesuit theologian, author, and religious instructor.

== Life ==
He was born in Säckingen, Baden, Germany. After entering the Society of Jesus in 1589 and completing his studies, he taught the classics at Freiburg and was professor of philosophy and of moral and dogmatic theology at Ingolstadt. He was appointed rector of the college of Ratisbon in 1605, and of the college of Munich in 1607, a post he held until 1623. In 1628 he was reappointed to the rectorship of Munich, and was still holding the office when an apoplexy ended his life.

He was consulted by Maximilian I, Elector of Bavaria, who entrusted to him some important affairs. He died in Munich.

== Works ==
His major works are: Tyrannicidium (Munich, 1611) and Catholisch Pabsttumb (Munich, 1614). The former, which appeared both in German and Latin, was an answer to a Calvinist attack on the teaching of the Society of Jesus on the subject of tyrannicide in which Keller argued that the Jesuit teaching followed prominent theologians, both Catholic and Protestant. The work on the Papacy was a reply to Jacob Heilbrunner (1548–1618), a Lutheran court theologian; it comprised a collection of answers to objections of Protestants. It was followed by a public debate between Keller and Heilbrunner. Keller published four other works on the subject.

Among his other works are:

- Ludovicus IV Imperator defensus contra Bzovium (Munster, 1618), historical
- Vita R. P. Petri Canisii, on Petrus Canisius

There were other polemical writings, e.g.

- Litura seu castigatio Cancellariae Hispanicae a Ludovico Camerario, Excancellario Bohemico, Exconciliario Heidelbergensii . . . instructae
- An der theil Anhaldischer Cancellay
- Tubus Galilaeanus
- Rhabarbarum domandae bili quam in apol[o]giae sua proritavit Ludov. Camerarius propinatum

He published other writings, under his own name or a pseudonym, mostly controversial.
