= Ekkehard III =

Ekkehard III was a monk of the Abbey of Saint Gall and a nephew of Ekkehard I and a cousin of Ekkehard II. He shared the educational advantages of his cousin and, at his invitation, accompanied him to Hohentwiel to superintend and direct the studies of the local clergy. On his return to St. Gall he was made dean of the abbey, and is reported to have filled this office for thirty years. He died early in the eleventh century.

== Sources ==
- Herbermann, Charles, ed. (1913). "Ekkehard". Catholic Encyclopedia. New York: Robert Appleton Company.
