= Johann Joseph Abert =

German composer (1832–1915)

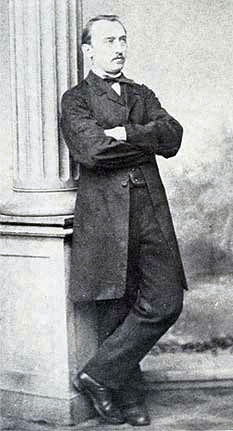
Johann Joseph Abert

Johann Joseph Abert (20 September 1832 – 1 April 1915 in Stuttgart) was a German composer. An ethnic German from the Sudetenland, he is also known in Czech as Jan Josef Abert.

== Life and career ==
Abert was born in Kochowitz near Gastorf, Bohemia, now Kochovice, Hoštka, Czech Republic. He studied double bass at the Prague Conservatory with Josef Hrabě and also received lessons in theory from Johann Friedrich Kittl and August Wilhelm Ambros. In 1853, Peter Josef von Lindpaintner selected him as a double bassist for the Court Orchestra at Stuttgart, the royal capital of Württemberg. He became the Court Kapellmeister in 1867 and remained in this office, previously occupied by Lindpainter, Friedrich Wilhelm Kücken, and Karl Anton Eckerts, until 1888.

Abert composed chamber music and lieder, as well as several successful operas. Of his seven symphonies, the Frühlingssinfonie (Spring Symphony, No. 7) in C, the program symphony Columbus (No. 4), and the Symphony in C minor (No. 2) are generally considered to be the best. The Württembergische Landesbibliothek in Stuttgart and the Deutsches Literaturarchiv Marbach currently share responsibility for the preservation of his manuscripts and other personal papers.

Abert's son, Hermann, became a noted music historian and his granddaughter, Anna Amalie, became Professor of Musicology at the University of Kiel.

== Recordings ==
Little of Abert's oeuvre has so far been recorded. However, there are recordings available of the String Quartet in A (together with a collection of songs), the opera Ekkehard, the 4th Symphony (Columbus), and the concertante works for double bass and orchestra. The opera Ekkehard was recorded with a young Jonas Kaufmann in the title role.

== Selected list of works ==
- Symphonies
  - Symphony No.1 in B minor (1852)
  - Symphony No.2 in C minor (1854)
  - Symphony No.3 in A major (1856)
  - Symphony No.4 in D major, Op. 31 (1865), "Columbus (Musikalisches Seegemälde in Form einer Sinfonie)"
  - Symphony No.5 in C minor (1870)
  - Symphony No.6 in D minor (1890), "Lyrische Sinfonie"
  - Symphony No.7 in C major (1894), "Frühlingssinfonie"
- Other works for orchestra
  - Overture in E major for large orchestra (1850)
  - Overture in D minor for large orchestra (1851)
  - Jubilation Overture for large orchestra, dedicated to Emperor Franz Joseph of Austria (1855)
  - Festive Overture in D major, composed at the occasion of the Württemberg royal wedding (1874)
  - Concert Overture
  - Tragic March, dedicated to the soldiers fallen in 1866 war (1866)
  - Celebration March, for the 25-year anniversary of the reign of King Karl I (1889)
  - Festive March for Harmony Band for the anniversary of the Ulanen Regiment of Queen Olga of Württemberg (1883)
- Concertos
  - Polonaise and Introduction in D major for double bass and orchestra (1848)
  - Variations and Rondo in C major for double bass and orchestra (1849)
  - Introduction and Polonaise in C major for double bass and orchestra (1849)
  - Concertino in F major for double bass and orchestra (1851)
  - Concerto for double bass and orchestra in D major (1851)
  - Rondeau for double bass and orchestra in C major (1852)
- Chamber Music
  - String Quartet in A, dedicated to Karl Eckert (1862)
- Operas
  - Anna von Landskron, libretto by Christian Gottfried Nehrlich, premiered 1858, Stuttgart
  - König Enzio, libretto by Albert Friedrich Benno Dulk, premiered 1862, Stuttgart
  - Astorga, libretto by Ernst Pasqué, premiered 1866, Stuttgart
  - Enzio von Hohenstaufen, premiered 1875, Stuttgart
  - Ekkehard, based on the novel by Joseph Viktor von Scheffel about Ekkehard von St. Gallen, premiered 1878, Hofoper Berlin
  - Die Almohaden, based on the play The Clock of Almudaina by Don Juan Palou y Coll, libretto by A. Kröner. Premiered 1890, Leipzig
