= Karl Agricola =

German artist

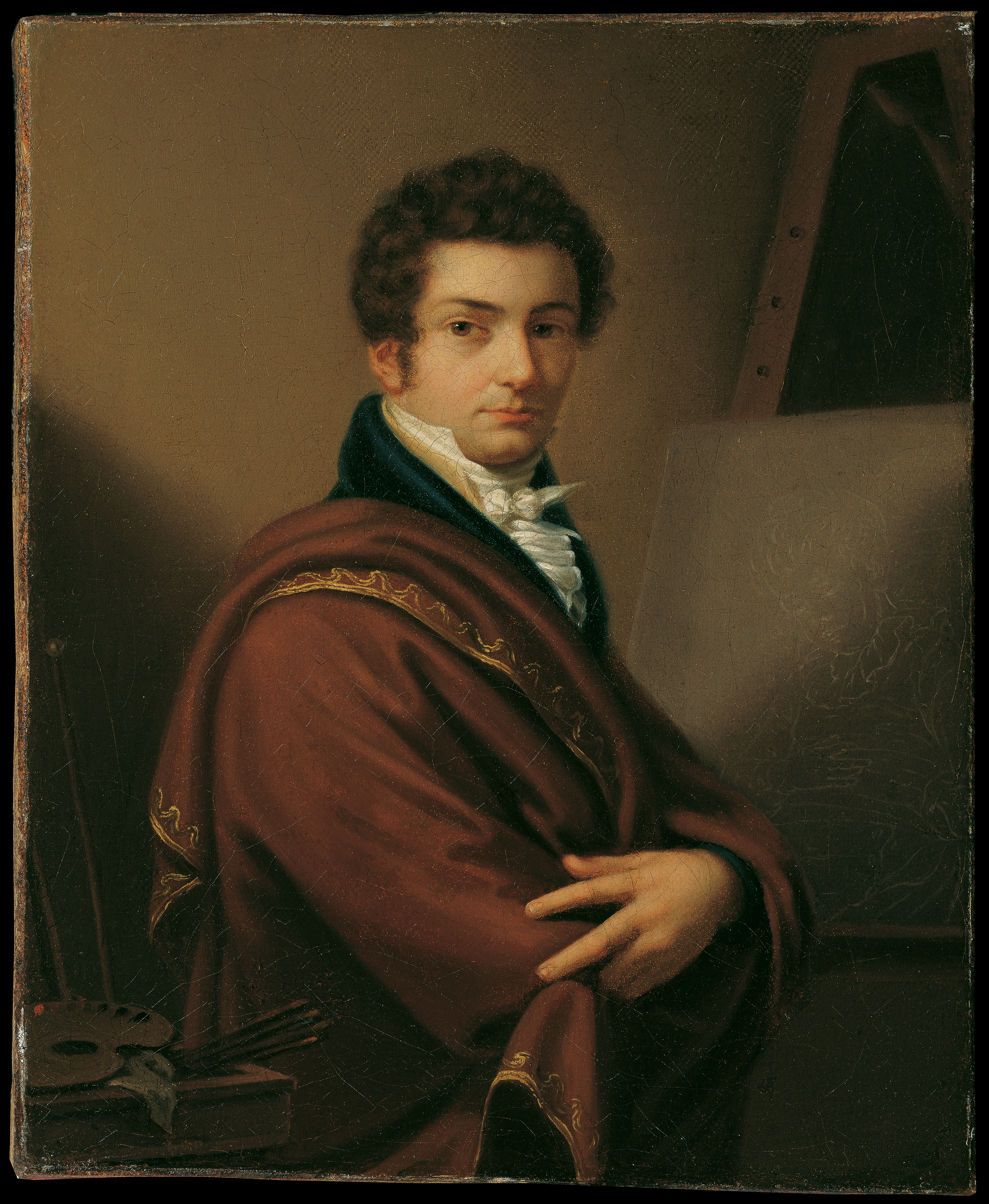
Self-portrait (c.1810)

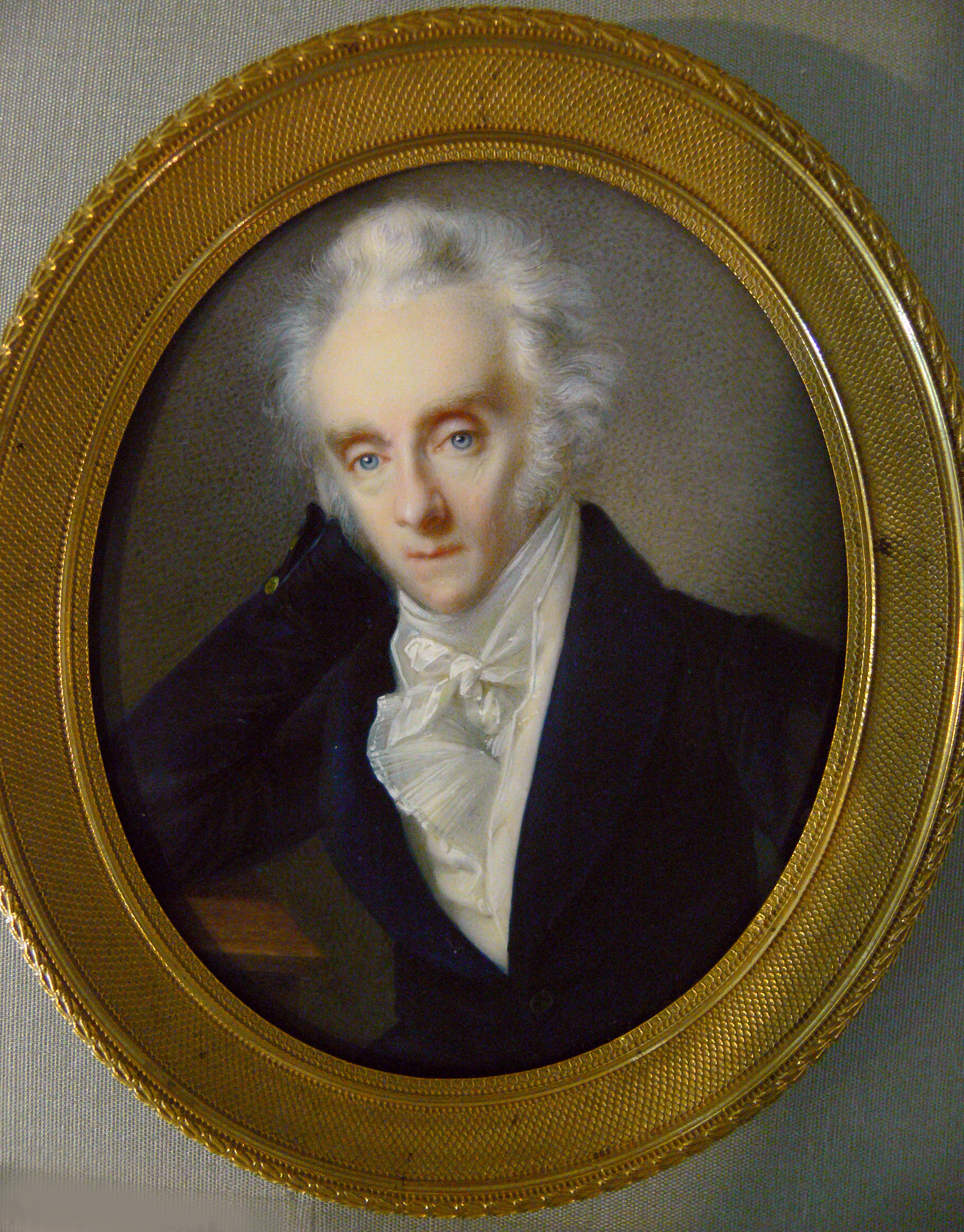
Franz Joseph, Prince of Dietrichstein

Karl Joseph Aloys Agricola (18 October 1779 – 15 May 1852) was a German artist, noted for his portrait miniatures.

== Life and works ==
Agricola was born at Bad Säckingen, Margraviate of Baden, in 1779. After a preliminary course of instruction in Karlsruhe, he went in 1798 to Vienna and enrolled the Academy, where he studied under Heinrich Füger.

He soon became known for his mythological pictures in oil and watercolour – such as his Cupid and Psyche – and for his etchings and lithographs; but he was most noted for his miniature portraits. After a prosperous career he died in Vienna in 1862.

He painted in the style of the end of the 18th century, and was an imitator of his teacher, Heinrich Füger. He made engraving after the works of Elzheimer, Raphael, Poussin, Parmigiano, Domenichino, Füger, and others.

== Gallery ==
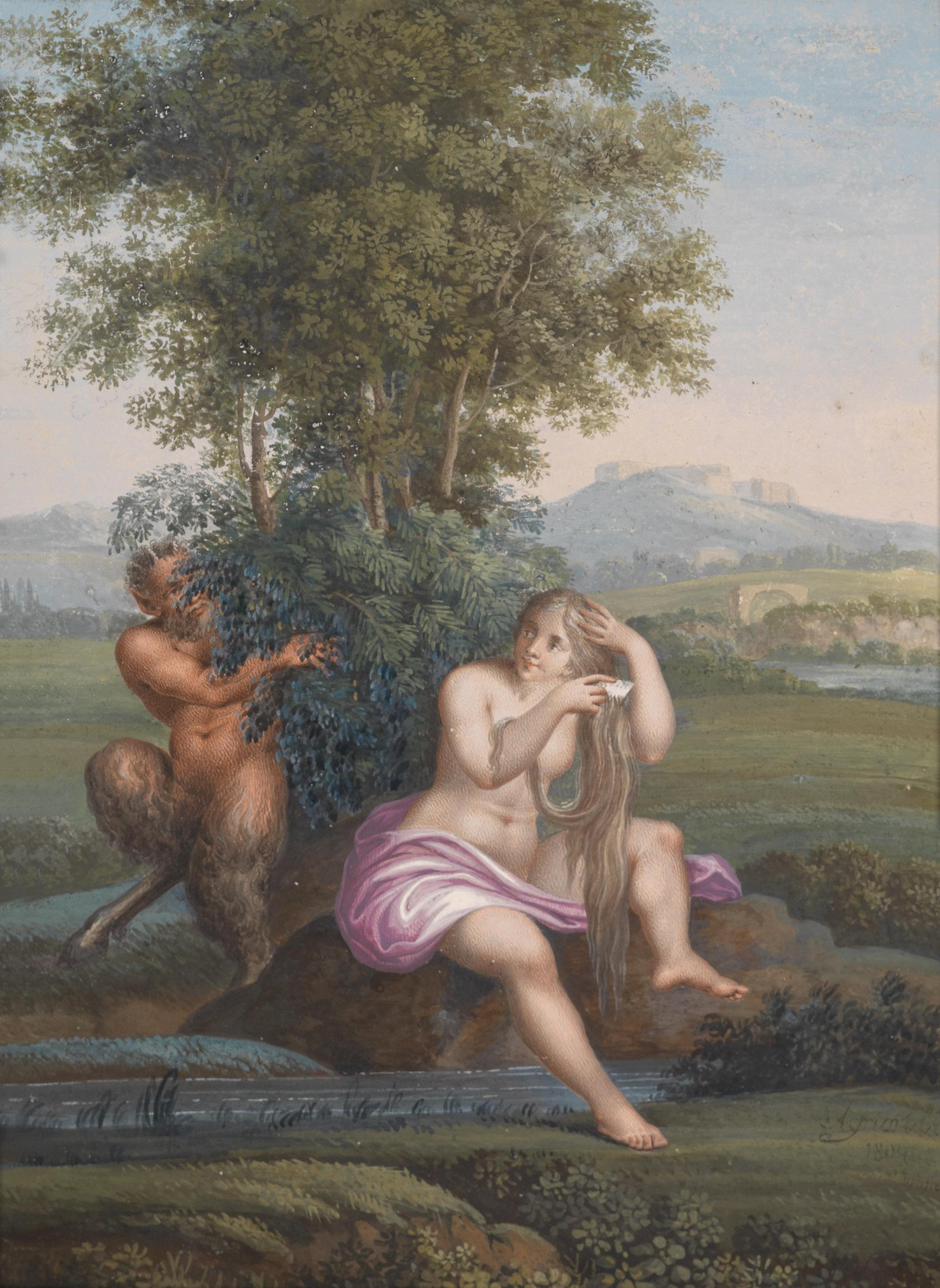
Bachnymphe und Faun, 1804

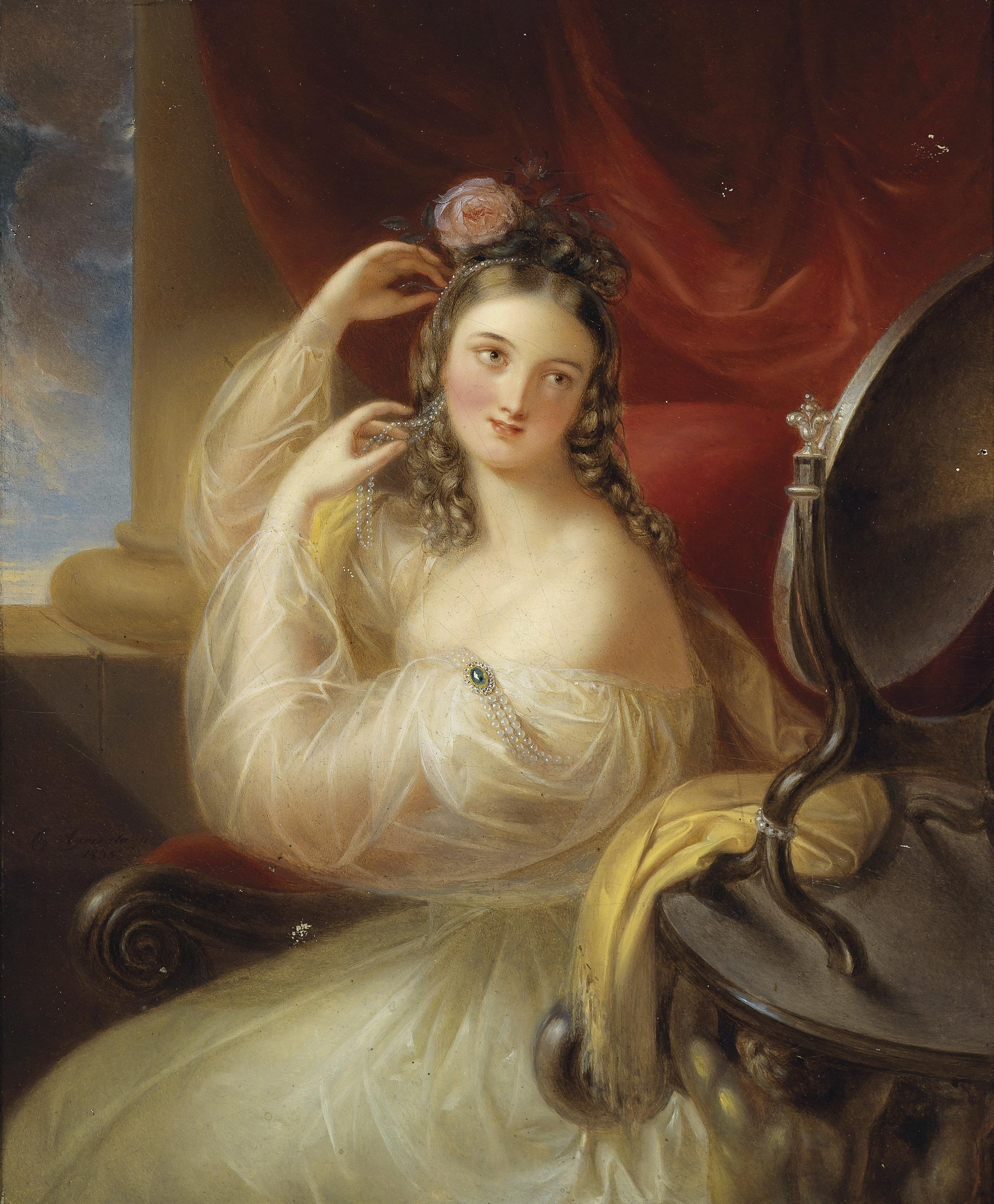
Lady in front of the toilet mirror, 1835

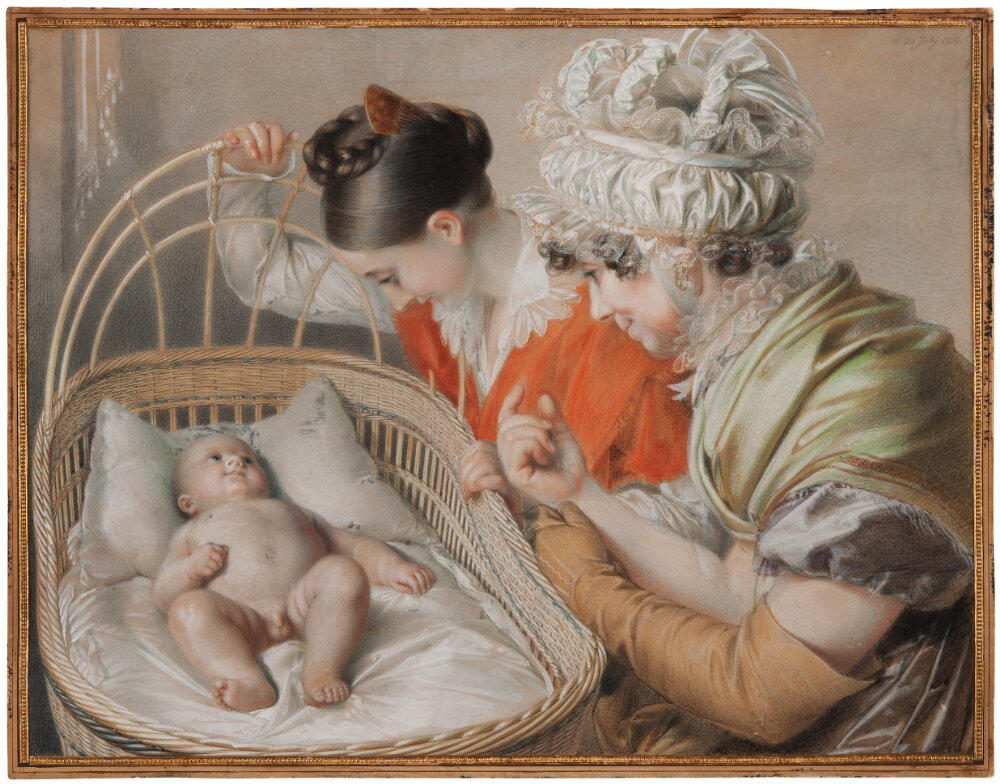
The Artist's Family, 1815

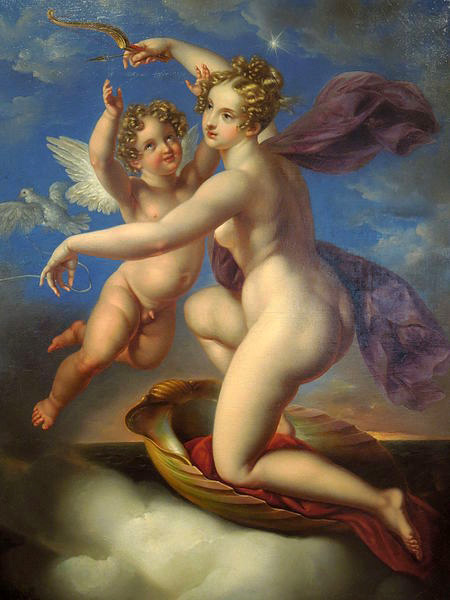
Venus and Cupid, 1824

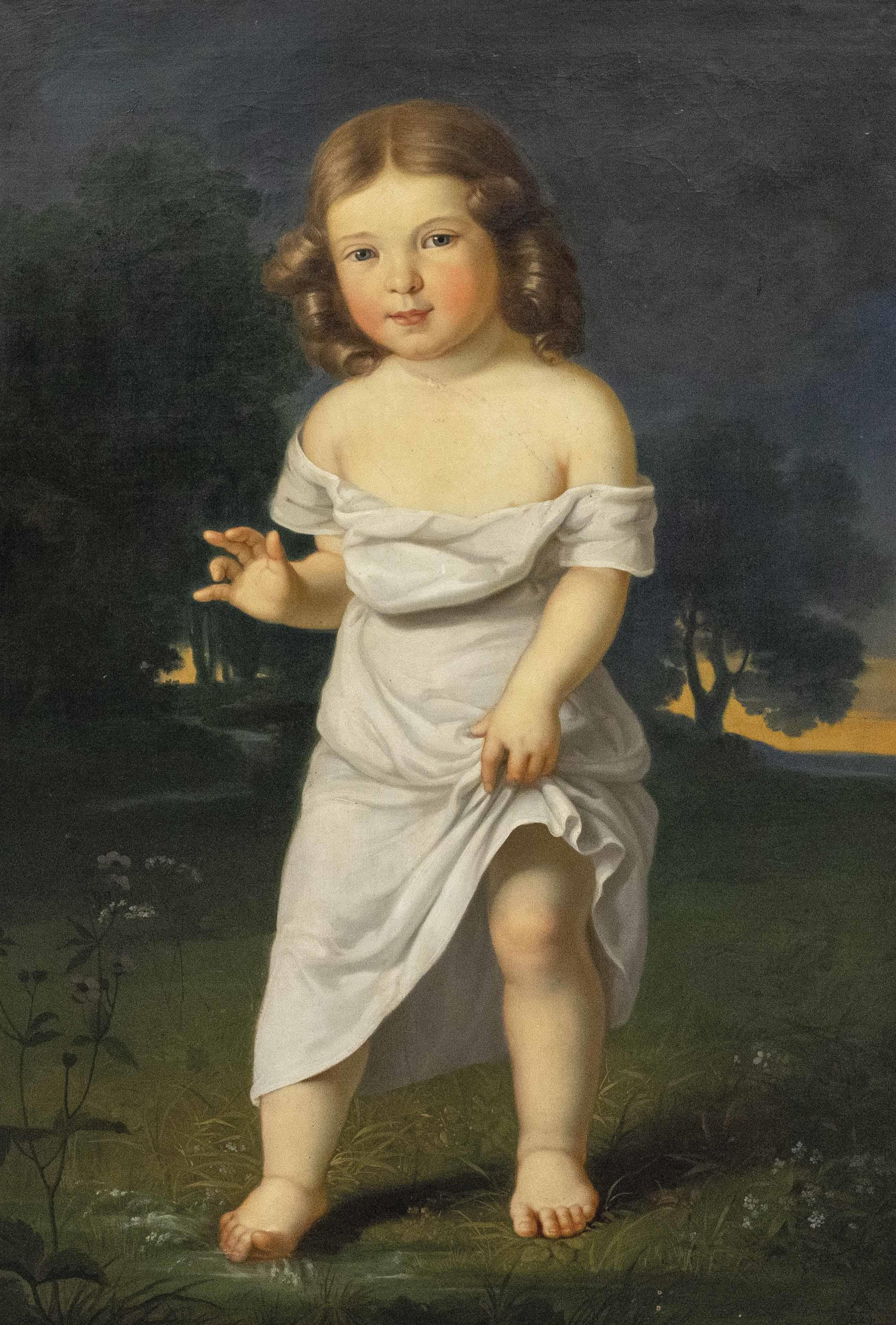
Portrait of a child in a white robe in front of a twilight landscape, splashing his foot into standing water, 1829

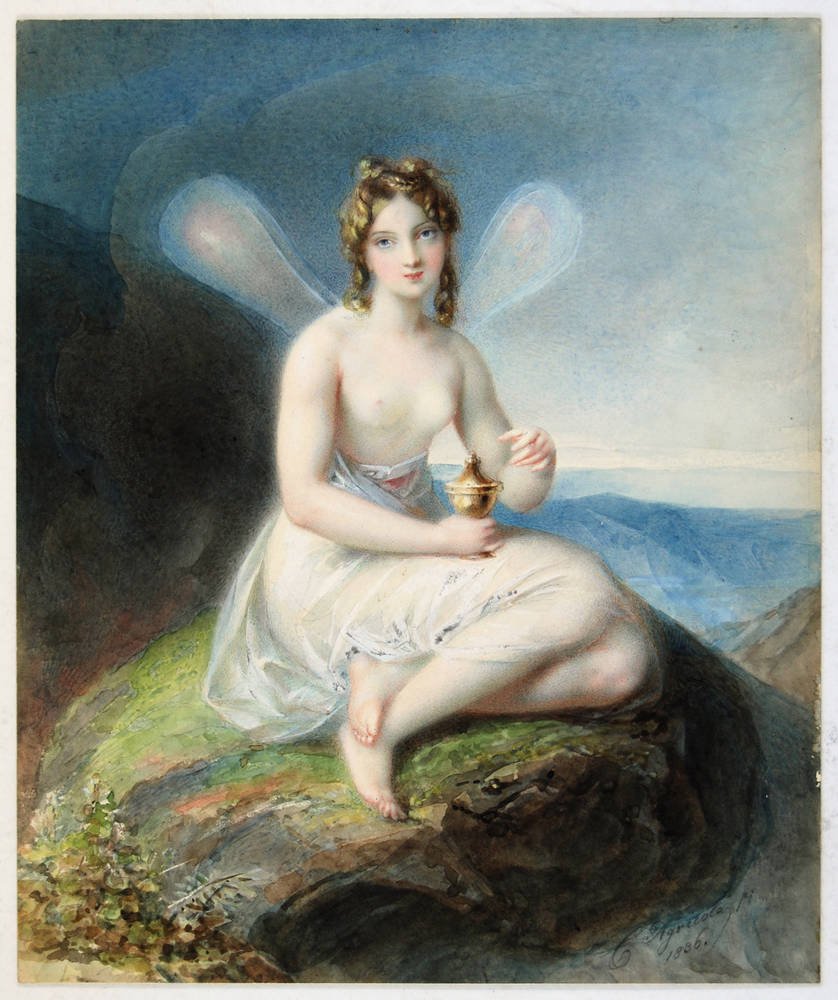
Psyche
