= Der Trompeter von Säckingen =

German Opera by Viktor Nessler

- Opera by Viktor Nessler
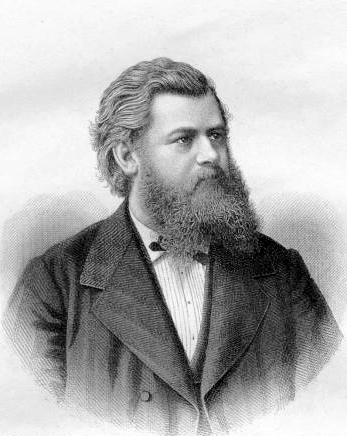
- The composer
- Translation: The Trumpeter of Säckingen
- Librettist: Rudolf Bunge
- Language: German
- Based on: Trompeter von Säkkingen by Joseph Viktor von Scheffel
- Premiere: 4 May 1884; Carola Stadttheater in Leipzig

Der Trompeter von Säckingen (The Trumpeter of Säckingen) is an opera in a prologue and three acts by Viktor Nessler. The German libretto was by Rudolf Bunge, based on the epic poem, Der Trompeter von Säkkingen [sic], by Joseph Victor von Scheffel.

== Performance history ==
Arthur Nikisch, to whom Nessler dedicated the opera, conducted the first performance at the Carola-Theater (or Stadttheater) in Leipzig on 4 May 1884. It was Nessler's greatest success, albeit in part because of the popularity of von Scheffel's poem. It was subsequently given at the Metropolitan Opera in New York City on 23 November 1887, and at the Theatre Royal, Drury Lane, in London on 8 July 1892 by the Hamburg Stadttheater, conducted by Leo Feld.

== Roles ==
Roles, voice types, premiere cast
Role	Voice type	Premiere cast, 4 May 1884 Conductor: Arthur Nikisch
Werner Kirchhofer, law student, later a trumpeter	baritone	Otto Schelper
Konradin, a trumpeter	bass	Karl Grengg
Baron von Schönau	bass	Karl Grengg
Maria, daughter of the Baron	soprano	Margarethe Jahns
Count von Wildenstein	bass	Karl Grengg
Countess Wildenstein, Maria's aunt, former wife of the Count	contralto	
Damian, son of the Count by a subsequent wife	tenor	George Marion
The majordomo	baritone	
The rector	bass	Karl Grengg

== Synopsis ==
Setting: 17th-century Heidelberg and Säkkingen, after the Thirty Years' War. The trumpeter Werner loves Maria, the daughter of the Baron, but her father and mother want her to marry the cowardly Damian. Werner proves himself a hero and is opportunely discovered to be of noble birth, so all ends happily.

== Recordings ==
- Nessler: Der Trompeter von Säckingen – WDR Rundfunkorchester Köln and Chorus, conductor: Helmuth Froschauer, Alfred Kuhn (bass); Christoph Späth (tenor); Franz Hawlata (bass); Hermann Prey (baritone); Katharina Kammerloher (mezzo-soprano); 2013 [1994] Capriccio C5187 (CD)

== Sources ==
- Casaglia, Gherardo (2005). "Der Trompeter von Säkkingen, 4 May 1884". L'Almanacco di Gherardo Casaglia (in Italian).
- Franklin, Peter (1992), "Trompeter von Säckingen, Der" in The New Grove Dictionary of Opera, ed. Stanley Sadie (London) ISBN 0-333-73432-7
