= Willie and Lady Maisry =

Traditional song

Song
- Genre: Scottish folk

Willie and Lady Maisry (Roud 198, Child 70), also known as William and Lady Marjorie, is an English-language traditional folk song, likely originating in Scotland. In the liner notes to folk musician Joe Rae's recording of this song, Rod Stradling writes that "Joe believes that the ballad is set in the area around Selkirk—possibly at Thirlstane Castle, in Lauderdale, to the north-east of Selkirk."

== Synopsis ==
Willie kills the watch on Lady Maisry's father's hall to get to her chamber. After the night, her father kills him. Lady Maisry taxes him with it. He may tell her that Willie killed the guard, but she retorts that they were in armor but Willie was not.

== Variants ==
This ballad has much in common with Clerk Saunders, with some influence from The Bent Sae Brown.
