= Ekkehard (opera) =

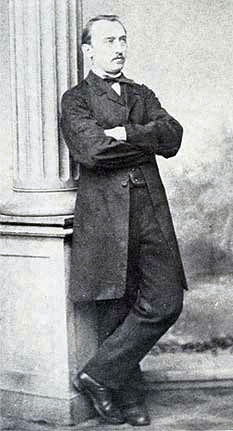
Picture of Johann-Josef Abert

Ekkehard is an 1878 German-language opera by Johann Joseph Abert to a libretto by Adolf Kröner after the novel Ekkehard by Joseph Victor von Scheffel. The plot tells a romantic episode in the life of Ekkehard II of Saint Gall.

== Recording ==
- Ekkehard - Jonas Kaufmann, Christian Gerhaher, Nyla van Ingen, Susanne Kelling, Henryk Böhm, Alfred Reiter, Stuttgarter Choristen, SWR Rundfunkorchester, Peter Falk. 2CDs Capriccio, DDD/LA, 1998
