= Wallbach (Bad Säckingen) =

Coordinates: 47°33′54″N 7°54′55″E

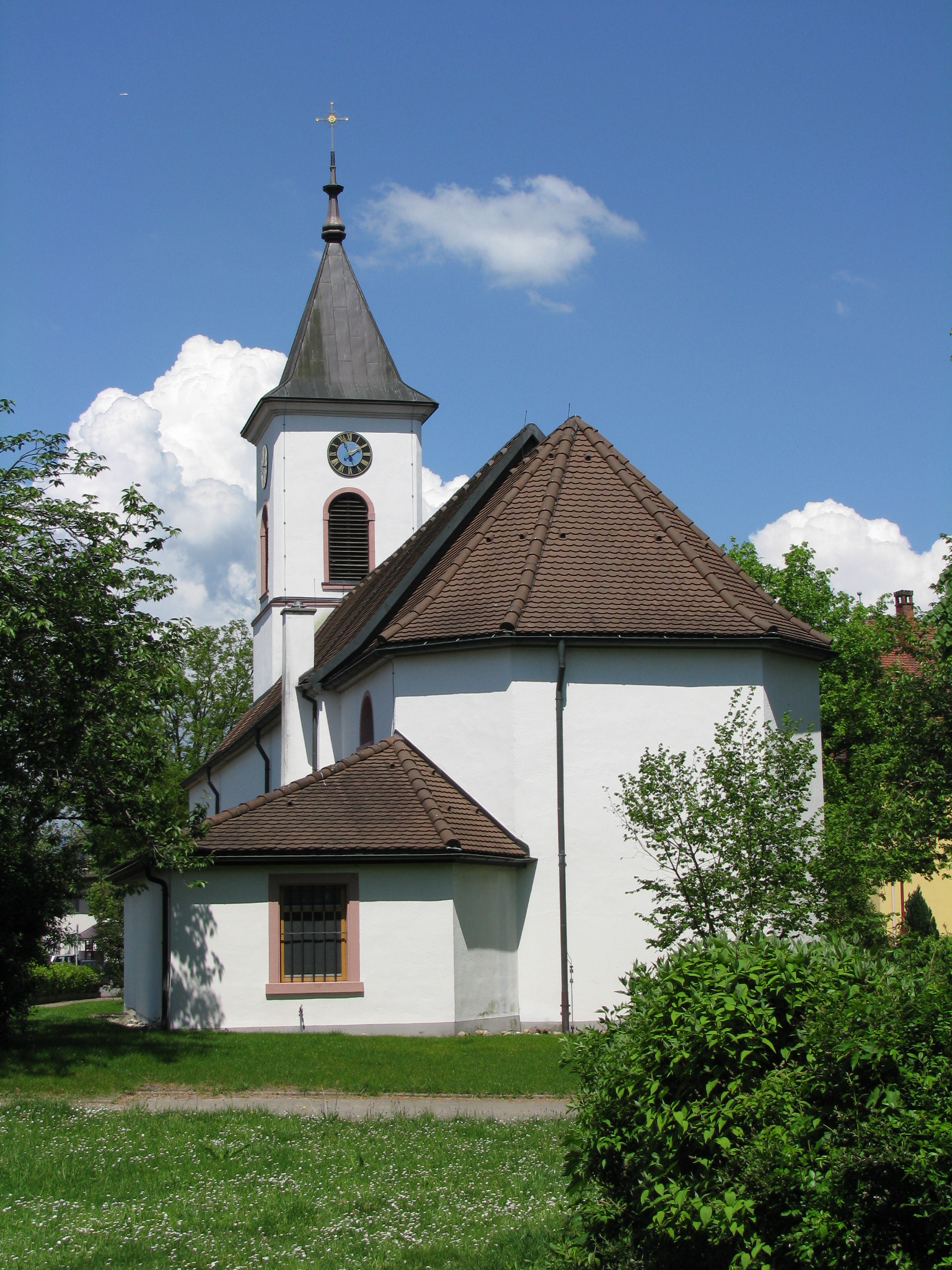

Wallbach (German pronunciation: [ˈvalbax]) is a small village in the southern part of the state of Baden-Württemberg in Germany. It has a population of 1,200. It is an administrative part of Bad Säckingen and located next to the Rhine very close to the border of Switzerland.
