= Katharine Jaffray =

Traditional song

Katharine Jaffray is Child ballad 221 (Roud 93). It exists in several variants. The poem first appears in Minstrelsy of the Scottish Border (Kelso: James Ballantyne, 1802), 1.216–19, under the title "The Laird of Laminton". The editor of this collection states

There are two copies of this ballad in Mr Herd’s MS. in one of which the bride’s name is Katherine Jaffrey, and the unlucky bridegroom is called the Laird of Lochinton, ‘out frae the English border.’—The Editor has been unable to discover whether the story is founded in fact

== Synopsis ==
A woman is wooed by a man who asks her family for leave. Another man comes and wins the consent of her family but does not bother to tell her until the wedding day. Her original lover comes to the wedding and carries her off. Sometimes there is a bloody fight.

Some variants end with a warning that Englishmen should not seek Scottish brides.

== Adaptations ==
This is similar to the Lochinvar tale included in Sir Walter Scott's Marmion; indeed, in one variant, the hero is named Lochinvar.

== See also ==
- David Herd (anthologist), Scottish anthologist
- Francis James Child (1825–1896), American educator and folklorist
