= Der Rattenfänger von Hameln =

1879 grand opera by Viktor Nessler

Der Rattenfänger von Hameln (The Rat-Catcher of Hamelin or The Piper of Hamelin) is a grand opera (Große Oper) in five acts by Viktor Nessler. The German libretto by Friedrich Hofmann is based on a 1875 romantic poem by Julius Wolff about the Pied Piper of Hamelin.

== Performance history ==
The opera was first performed at the Neues Stadttheater in Leipzig, on 19 March 1879, conducted by Arthur Nikisch. The first performance in the U.S. was at the Thalia Theatre, New York City, on 28 April 1886 conducted by John Lund.

The premiere in Vienna was given in 1897, which the critic Eduard Hanslick attended. He regarded the opera as overly long and old fashioned.

== Roles ==
Roles, voice types
Role	Voice type
Hunold Singuf, the rat-catcher	baritone
Bertholdus de Sunneborne, the bailiff	bass
Heribert de Sunneborne, son of Bertholdus, in love with Regina	tenor
Ethelerus, a clerk, also in love with Regina	tenor
Gertrud, a fisher-girl	soprano
Wulf, a smith, in love with Gertrude	baritone
Isfried Rhynperg, canon	bass
Wichard Gruwelhot, the mayor	bass
Regina, the mayor's daughter	soprano
Dorothea, Regina's cousin	contralto

== Synopsis ==
The 13th-century tale is about Hunold Singuf, a name given by Wolff in his poem to the "pied piper", who rids the town of Hamelin of its rats. Hunold is not suitably rewarded by the townspeople, and they pay a terrible price when he lures all the children away and they disappear.
