= Earl Brand =

Traditional song

"Earl Brand" (Child 7, Roud 23) is a pseudo-historical English ballad.

== Synopsis ==
The hero, who may be Earl Brand, Lord Douglas, or Lord William, flees with the heroine, who may be Lady Margaret. A Carl Hood may betray them to her father, but they are always pursued. The hero kills the pursuers and is mortally wounded. He gets the heroine to his mother's house, but when he dies, she dies of sorrow.

== Commentary ==
This ballad has many similarities with Child ballad 8, Erlinton, where the lovers succeed in their escape, and the fight scenes often have details in common across variants. Francis James Child only reluctantly separated them, but concluded that because the lovers' assailants are her kin in Earl Brand and strangers in Erlinton, they were separate types.

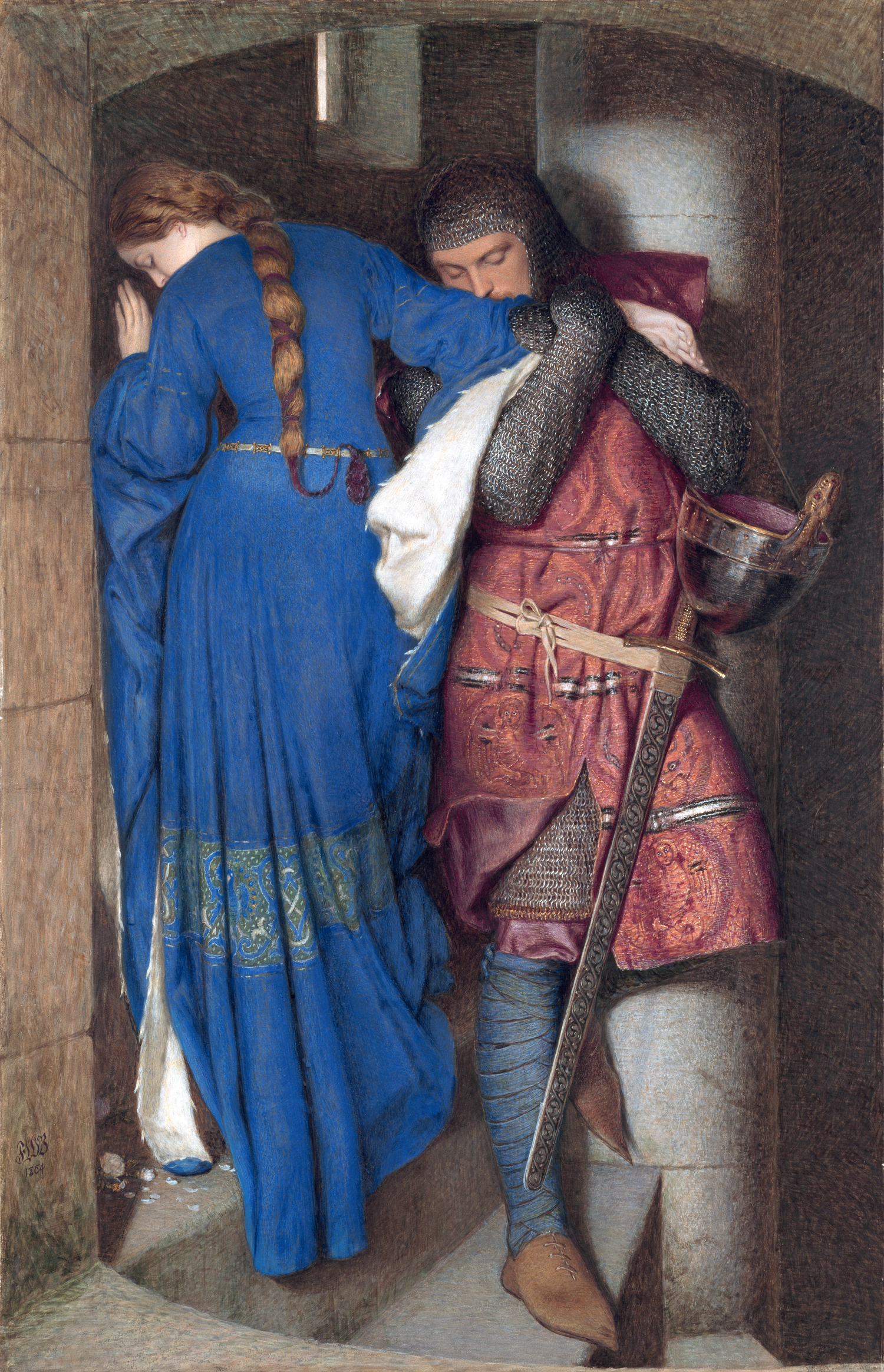
Hellelil and Hildebrand, the meeting on the turret stairs

Scandavian variants often have a detail that Child believed was originally contained but lost from the English ballad: the hero warns the heroine not to speak his name, and when he is about to kill her last brother, she begs him by name to let the brother live to bear the news, and this causes his death. These variants include the Danish Ribold and Guldborg and Hildebrand and Hilde and the German Waltharius and Þiðrekssaga.

Auld Carl Hood is also an old man in the Scandavian variants; he appears to be a malicious figure of Odin or Woden.

Many variants of this ballad end with flowers growing from the lovers' grave. This is a common motif for all manner of ballads having no other connection, such as Fair Margaret and Sweet William, Lord Thomas and Fair Annet, Fair Janet, and Lord Lovel, and in tales and ballads found throughout Europe and parts of Asia. This is found in the legend of Tristan and Iseult, which is sometimes supposed to be the source, but there is no evidence for its being older in the romances than in the ballad.

== Cultural uses ==
Frederick William Burton drew upon a Danish ballad of this type for his "Meeting on the Turret Stairs", depicting the parting of the lovers before the fight.

== See also ==
- List of the Child Ballads
- Erlinton
- Hildebrand
- Walter
