= Clerk Saunders =

Traditional song

Clerk Saunders (Roud 3855, Child 69) is an English-language folk song, likely originating somewhere in England or Scotland. It exists in several variants.

== Synopsis ==
Clerk Saunders and may Margaret ("may" meaning maiden and being a title rather than a name) are walking in the garden. He persuades her to go to bed with him before their marriage, saying that he will let himself in and she can cover her eyes, so that she can swear that she did not let him in or see him. Her seven brothers catch them and argue over what to do, but the youngest kills him without a word, and Margaret finds him dead in the morning. They bury him.

In some versions his ghost appears at her window and tells her she must release him from his promise. She demands a kiss, but he tells her it would kill her. She frees him.

== Variants ==
The woman who attempts to conceal her lover, and the family members who find him, are common ballad motifs. Willie and Lady Maisry has much in common with it. There are also variants on Sweet William's Ghost (Child 77, version F) in which the name Clerk Saunders is used, and with content akin to the end of the song.

== Recordings ==
Frequently recorded by some of the best known names in the English and Scottish folk traditions. Well-known recordings include:

- Jean Redpath on her 1980 album, Lowlands
- Emily Smith on her 2014 album, Echoes
- Malinky on their 2005 album, The Unseen Hours
- Eliza Carthy on the 1996 album, Heat Light and Sound
- June Tabor on her second solo album, Ashes and Diamonds from 1977
- Martin Simpson on Kind Letters (2005) and various collections

== Depictions ==
Clerk Saunders is the subject, and title, of paintings by Edward Burne-Jones in the Tate Collection and Elizabeth Siddal, currently in the collection of the Fitzwilliam Museum.

== See also ==
- Sweet William's Ghost
