= Château du Wasigenstein =

Ruined castle in Bas-Rhin, Grand Est, France

Coordinates: 49°2′52″N 7°42′6″E

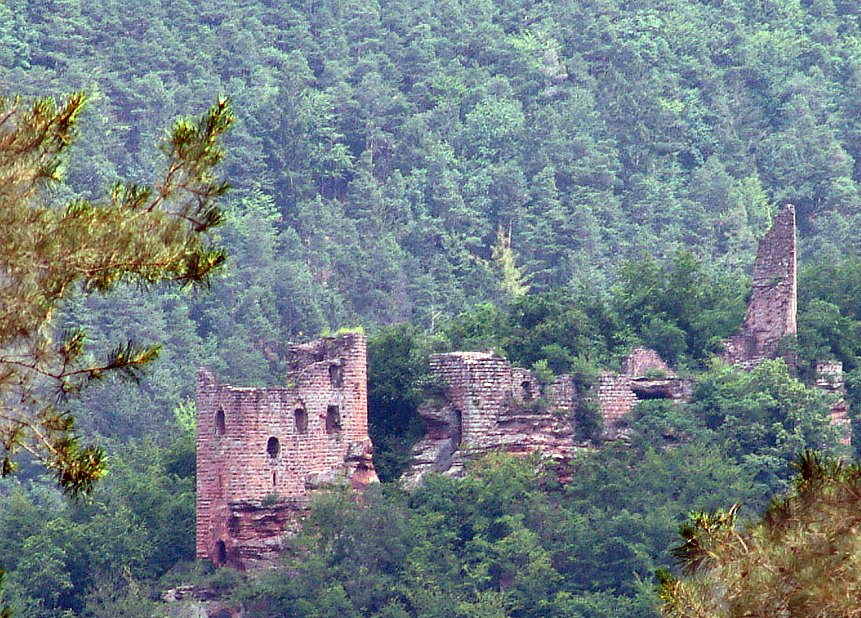
Château du Wasigenstein

The Château du Wasigenstein (German: Burg Wasigenstein) is a ruined castle in the commune of Niedersteinbach in the Bas-Rhin département of France.

== History ==
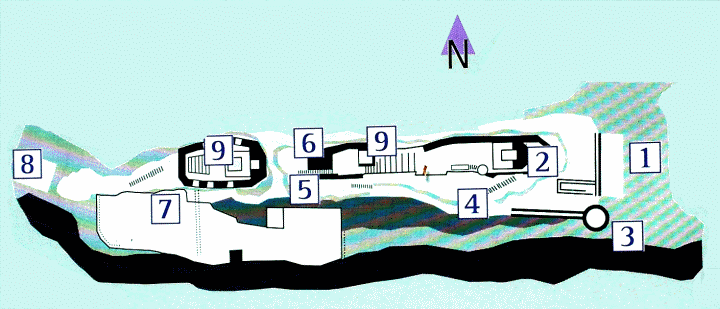
Diagram of Wasigenstein

The site was first known as the centre of the German legend of Waltharius in the 10th century. Two castles were built here in the 13th century each dependent on the other.

The complex initially occupied only the eastern part of the castle rock, but was expanded from 1299 and supplemented by a second castle complex on the western part of the rock. Since then, it has been a double castle. The shares in both were held by members of the various lines of the von Wasigenstein family until the middle of the 14th century. When the male line died out, the property passed through heir daughters to the Fleckensteins and Hohenburgs. They sold their rights to the property piece by piece, or passed parts on as fiefdoms, so that there was a strong fragmentation of ownership. Within 83 years, it was besieged and conquered a total of seven times. The castle, which was probably very dilapidated afterwards, was given up as a residence in the 15th or 16th century. It was damaged by fire in the Thirty Years War and was completely destroyed in the War of the Palatinate Succession and has been in ruins ever since. The castle is state property and has been listed since 1898 as a monument historique by the French Ministry of Culture.

== Key points ==
- at Grand-Wasigenstein, the former cistern, the keep, well-built rooms, etc.
- at Petit-Wasigenstein, a habitable keep with a thick walls, an enormous windlass capable of lifting considerable loads
- access stairways cut into the rock: a monumental architectural work provided a steep ascent to the summits
- a rift fault, separating the two castles ("the fault of Walther")
- erosion on the south face of the rocky outcrop
- a viewpoint over the Langenbach valley and towards Obersteinbach

== Access ==
From the Wengelsbach pass on the D 190, parking at Wasigenstein, a footpath of the Club Vosgien, signposted with red rectangles, leads to the castle.

== See also ==
- List of castles in France
