= Ernst Pasqué =

German opera singer

Ernst Heinrich Anton Pasqué (3 September 1821 – 20 March 1892) was a German operatic baritone, opera director, theatre director, writer and librettist.

== Life ==
Born in Cologne, at the age of 17 Pasqué decided to have his voice trained. At the instigation of Daniel-François-Esprit Auber, he was accepted at the Conservatoire de Paris. There he was a pupil of the tenor Antoine Ponchard.

On 4 May 1844 he made his debut as a "hunter" in the "night camp" in Mainz.

He came in 1845 as baritone to the Staatstheater Darmstadt. From 1846 to 1847 he was active in Leipzig, but then went back to Darmstadt.

In the summer of 1855 he was director of the Deutsche Oper in Amsterdam, and from 1856 to 1859 opera director in Weimar.

After illness and the loss of his voice he became an economic inspector in Darmstadt in 1859. Besides music-related literature, his main work "Geschichte der Musik und des Theater am Hofe zu Darmstadt", he also wrote stories and the libretto to Johann Joseph Abert's opera Astorga.

Pasqué died in Alsbach-Hähnlein at the age of 70.

== Work ==
Fiction

- Der Karlsberg. Kulturgeschichtlicher Roman. Verlag Ries, Homburg 1902
- Eine Visitenkarte Bismarcks. Erzählungen. Hillger Verlag, Leipzig 1899.
- In Paris. Heitere Geschichten aus den Lehrjahren eines Sängers. B. Behr Buchhandlung, Berlin 1872.
- Aus der Welt der Töne. Erlebnisse eines Mädchen-Quartetts im Haidehause. Onkel Reinholds Erzählungen a.d. Bereich der Oper, des Volksliedes, des Künstlerthums und des Tanzes. 70 Text-Illustrationen und vier Tonbilder. Leipzig, Verlag Otto Spamer, 1878.

non-fiction book

- Goethe’s Theaterleitung in Weimar. Leipzig 1863. volume 1 is available for free viewing and download at the Internet Archive, volume 2 is available for free viewing and download at the Internet Archive
- Geschichte der Musik und des Theaters am Hofe zu Darmstadt. Mit Berücksichtigung der diesbezüglichen Hoffeste, der Biografien betheiligter Künstler und im Zusammenhange mit der allgemeinen deutschen Musik- und Theatergeschichte. Wittich, Darmstadt 1853.
