= Viktor Nessler =

French music composer (born 1841)

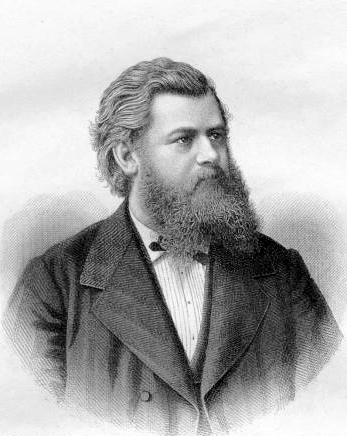
Victor Nessler

Viktor (or Victor) Ernst Nessler (28 January 1841 – 28 May 1890) was an Alsatian composer who worked mainly in Leipzig.

Nessler was born at Baldenheim near Sélestat, Alsace. At Strasbourg he began his university career with the study of theology, but he concluded it with the production of a light opera entitled Fleurette (1864). To complete his knowledge of music Nessler went to Leipzig to study with Moritz Hauptmann. In 1870, he was appointed chorus master and later conductor of the Caroltheater, Leipzig.

His musically conservative, mock-Gothic, fairy-tale operas, notably Der Rattenfänger von Hameln (The Pied Piper of Hamelin) (1879) and Der Trompeter von Säkkingen (1884), based on the famous poem by Joseph Viktor von Scheffel, were very popular in the 19th century. The great conductor Artur Nikisch composed an orchestral arrangement of material from Der Trompeter von Säkkingen. Besides a number of other operas, Nessler wrote many songs and choral works; but it is with the Trompeter von Säkkingen that his name is most closely associated. In 1895 a monument to him by the sculptor Alfred Marzolff was erected in Strasbourg, the place of his death.

== Works ==
- Fleurette (1864 Strasbourg)
- Dornröschens Brautfahrt (1867 Leipzig)
- Die Hochzeitsreise (1867 Leipzig)
- Am Alexandertag (1869 Leipzig)
- Nachtwächter und Student (1871 Leipzig)
- Irmingard (1876 Leipzig)
- Der Rattenfänger von Hameln (1879 Leipzig)
- Der wilde Jäger (1881 Leipzig)
- Der Trompeter von Säckingen (1884 Leipzig)
- Otto der Schütz (1886 Leipzig)
- Die Rose von Strassburg (1890 Munich)
