= Ekkehard I =

German writer

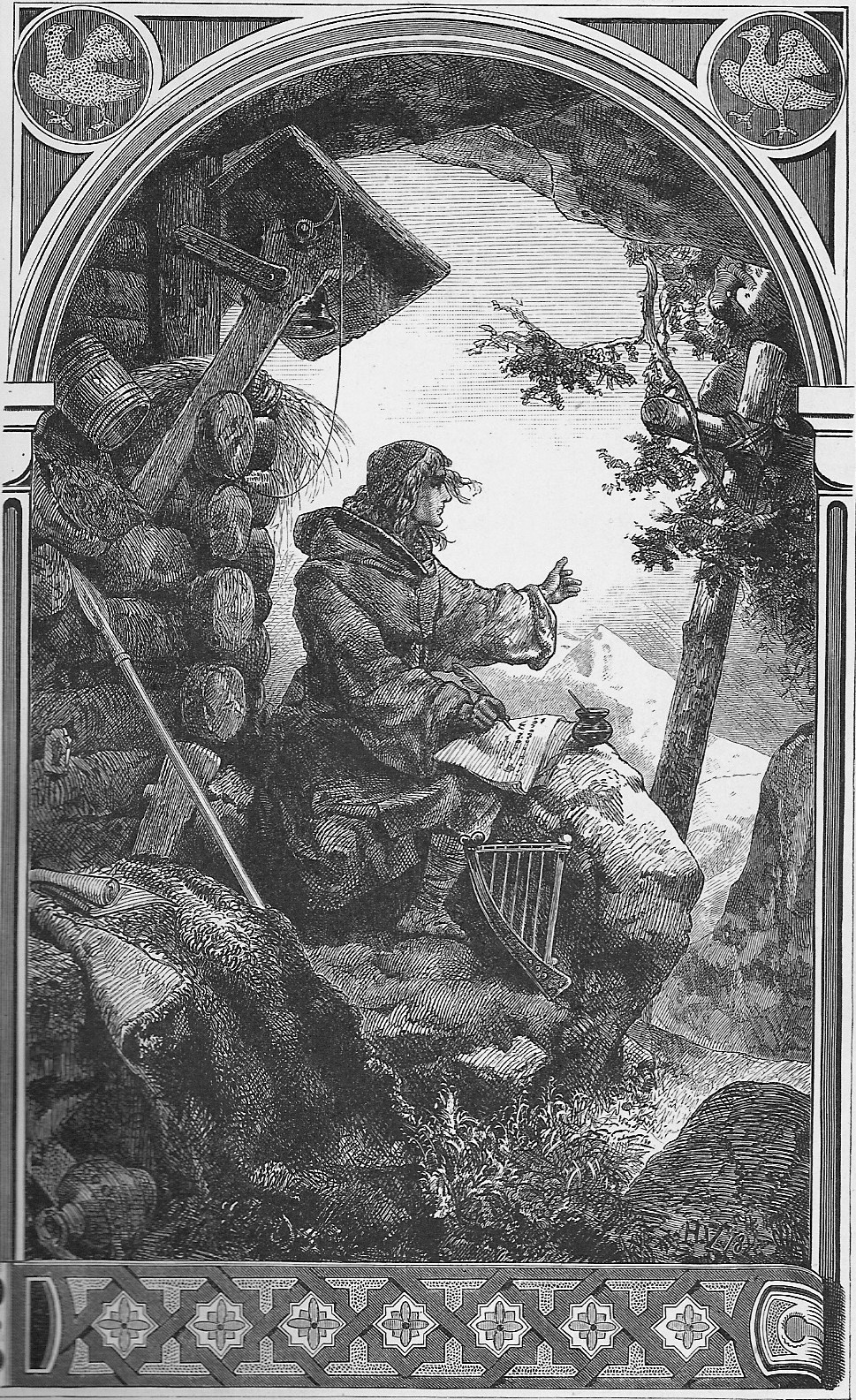
A picture of Ekkehard I

Ekkehard I (Latin: Eccehardus; died 14 January 973), called Major or Senex (the Elder), was a monk of the Abbey of Saint Gall. He was of noble birth, of the Jonschwyl family in Toggenburg, and was educated in the monastery of St. Gall. After joining the Benedictine Order, he was appointed director of the inner school there. Later, under Abbot Kralo, who trusted him implicitly, he was elected dean of the monastery and, for a time, directed all the affairs of the abbey.

Ekkehard made a pilgrimage to Rome, where he stayed for some time under Pope John XII, who presented him with various relics of St. John the Baptist. After Kralo's death Ekkehard refused the abbatial succession, because of lameness resulting from a fractured leg. However, he directed the choice of Burkard, son of Count Ulrich of Buchhorn, who governed St. Gall with the advice and co-operation of Ekkehard. The latter erected a hospice in front of the monastery for the sick and strangers, and was in many other ways a model of charity.

He was also distinguished as a poet and wrote a Latin epic "Waltharius", basing his version on an original German text. He dedicated this poem to Bishop Erkanbald of Strasburg (965-991). It describes the elopement of Walter of Aquitaine with the Burgundian princess Hildegunde from the land of the Huns, followed by the battle of Wasgenstein between Walter and the followers of Gunther and Hagen (ed. Peiper, Berlin, 1873).

He also composed various ecclesiastical hymns and sequences, e. g., in honour of the Blessed Trinity, St. John the Baptist, St. Benedict, St. Columbanus and St. Stephen (Meyer, "Philologische Bemerkungen zum Waltharius" in "Abhandl. der bayr. Akad. d. Wissenschaften", Munich, 1873. Streeker, "Ekkehard und Virgil" in "Zeitschrift f. deutsches Altertum", 1898, XLII, 338-366).

== In popular culture ==
- Ekkehard (1855) - historical romance by Joseph Victor von Scheffel.

== Sources ==
- Herbermann, Charles, ed. (1913). "Ekkehard". Catholic Encyclopedia. New York: Robert Appleton Company.
