= Hobie Noble =

Traditional song

Hobie Noble (Roud 4014, Child 189) is an Anglo-Scottish border ballad.

== Synopsis ==
Hobie Noble, an Englishman, was outlawed and fled to Scotland. A traitor tried to persuade him to come to England. The traitor failed, but learned where Hobie was going, and sent word. Hobie dreamed that he was attacked, and awoke. He and his men tried to escape, but his attackers found and defeated them. Hobie was taken prisoner and carried off, to many comments that he had freed Jock o the Side. He refused to confess to any crimes, and said he would rather be a prisoner than a traitor.
