= Archie o Cawfield =

Traditional song

Archie o Cawfield, also known as "The Bold Archer", "The Bold Prisoner", or "The Escape of Old John Webb"", is an Anglo-Scottish border ballad, number 188 of the Child ballads.

== Synopsis ==
Two brothers lament that their third brother is to be hanged. A proposal of force is met by the more cunning brother with the suggestion that they bring only a handful of men. They get horses, have them shod, and set out. Once they sneak into the prison, the captive brother says he is carrying too heavy a load of chain to escape. They carry him off anyway and cross a river that their pursuers can not. The former captor asks for the chains back. The captive says that he will use them to shoe horses.

Irish rock band, U2, closed several pub concerts with this ballad during early U.S. tours in the early 1980s. Bono was quoted in Rolling Stone magazine as saying the ballad was deeply moving since he felt a strong connection to the ballad's protagonist.

== See also ==
- Jock o the Side
