= Erlinton =

Traditional song

"Erlinton" (Roud 24, Child 8) is an English-language folk ballad. One variant features Robin Hood, but this variant forces the folk hero into a ballad structure where he does not fit naturally.

== Synopsis ==
Erlinton imprisons his daughter in her bower, to keep her from sinning. She persuades her sister to go to the woods with her, and escapes her with her lover Willie. They are attacked, by knights or outlaws, but he fights and kills them all, and they escape.

In the Robin Hood variant, Robin sees a woman walking in the woods and persuades her to run away with him; unlike the other variants, they are not already lovers and she does not need to escape her father. Her brothers attack, but Robin kills all of them except the youngest.

== Commentary ==
This ballad has many similarities with Child ballad 7, Earl Brand, where the lovers' escape ends in their deaths, and the fight scenes often have details in common across variants. Francis James Child only reluctantly separated them, but concluded that because the lovers' assailants are her kin in Earl Brand and strangers in Erlinton, they were separate types.

== See also ==
- List of the Child Ballads
