= Jock o' the Side =

Traditional song

Jock of the Side or Jock O' the Side (Roud 82, Child 187) is a border ballad existing in several variants.

The rescue it depicts is recorded solely in popular tradition, although Jock of the Side himself appears to have existed.

== Synopsis ==
A failed raid results in the capture of Jock of the Side. Hobie Noble—in some variants his illegitimate half-brother, and in some an outlawed Englishman—set out with few men to rescue him. They sneak into the castle, over the hall or by murdering the porter, and find and rescue him. They must carry him off in his chains, but they get him away. In some variant, once they have escaped by crossing a river, the former captor asks for the chains back, but the prisoner says he will use them to shoe horses.

== See also ==
- Archie o Cawfield
