= Ekkehard (novel) =

1855 novel by Joseph Victor von Scheffel

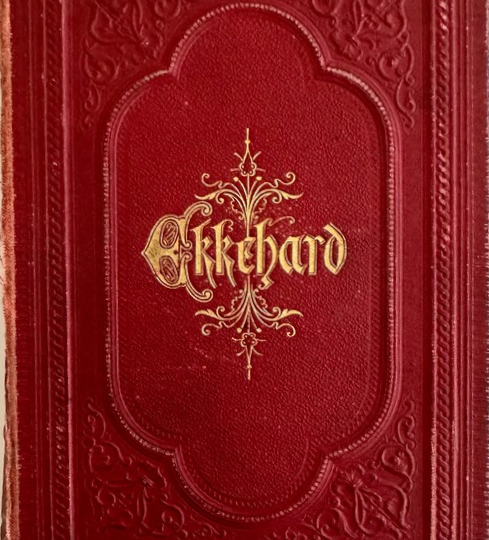
- Author: Joseph Victor von Scheffel
- Language: German
- Genre: historican novel
- Publisher: Johann Valentin Meidinger Sohn
- Publication date: 1855
- Publication place: Germany
- Pages: 467

Ekkehard is an 1855 historical novel by the German writer Joseph Victor von Scheffel.

== Plot ==
The novel is about the 10th-century monk and hymn writer Ekkehard II at the Abbey of Saint Gall. Ekkehard has a romantic affair with a widow who visits the abbey. He has an oak cut down when he learns a woman is using it in pagan ceremonies. When there is a Hun invasion, Ekkehard goes to battle and proves to be a skilled warrior.

== Reception ==
The novel was published in 1855 by Johann Valentin Meidinger Sohn. With the 4th edition in 1873, it turned into a phenomenon, becoming one of Germany's most popular novels of the 19th century. By 1903, it had been printed in 200 editions.

== Adaptations ==
- Ekkehard, 1878 opera by Johann Joseph Abert to a libretto by Adolf Kröner
- Ekkehard, 1990 TV miniseries
