= Joseph Victor von Scheffel =

German poet and novelist (1826–1886)

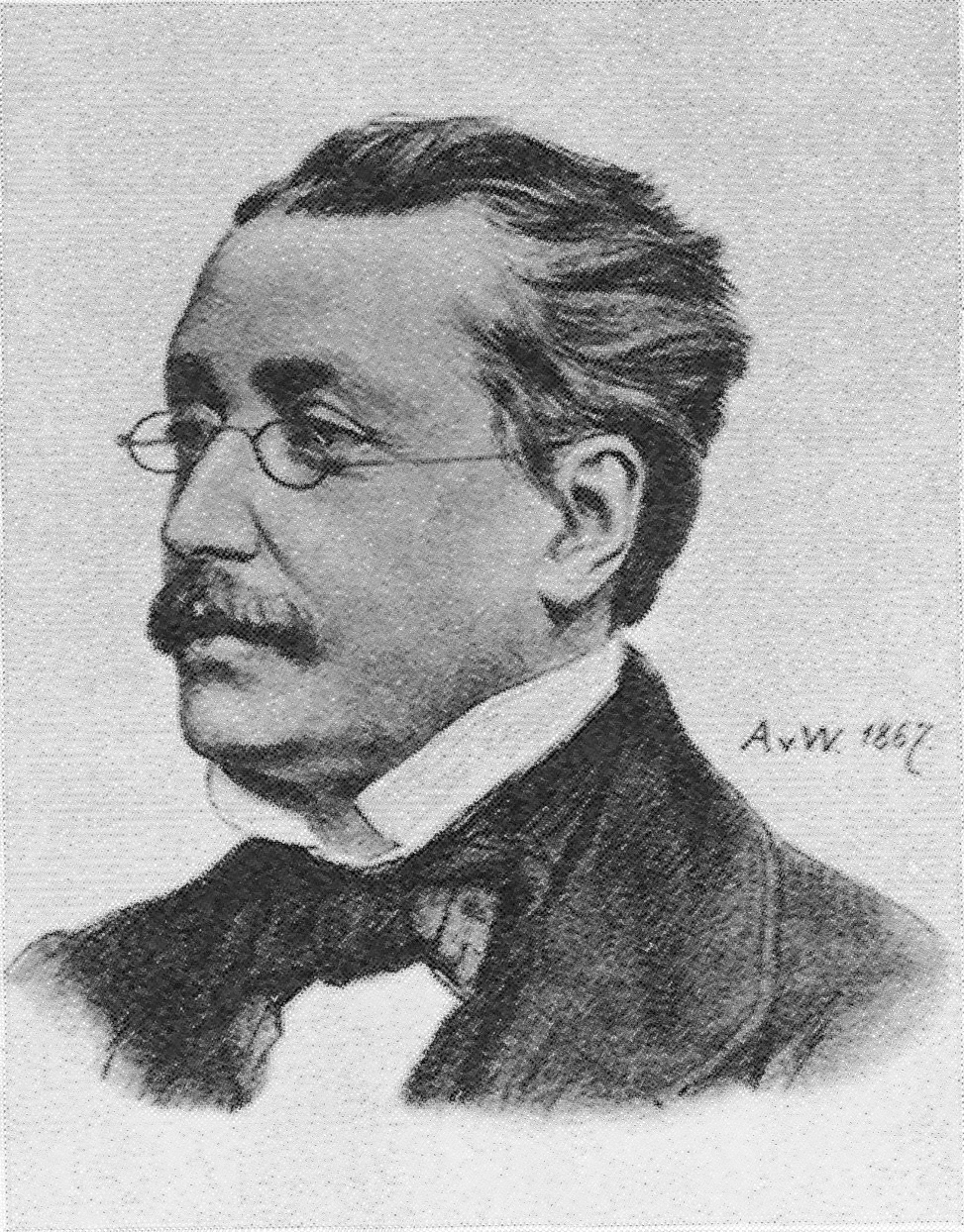
Joseph von Scheffel; drawing by Anton von Werner

Joseph Victor von Scheffel (16 February 1826 – 9 April 1886) was a German poet and novelist. His novel Ekkehard (1855) became one of the most popular German novels in the 19th century.

== Biography ==
He was born at Karlsruhe. His father, a retired major in the Baden army, was a civil engineer and member of the commission for regulating the course of the Rhine; his mother, née Josephine Krederer, the daughter of a prosperous tradesman at Oberndorf am Neckar, was a woman of great intellectual powers and of a romantic disposition. Young Scheffel was educated at the lyceum at Karlsruhe and afterwards (1843–1847) at the Ludwig-Maximilians-Universität München, Heidelberg University, and the Friedrich Wilhelm University of Berlin.

After passing the state examination for admission to the judicial service, he graduated as Doctor juris and for four years (1848–1852) held an official position at the town of Säckingen. Here he wrote his epic poem Der Trompeter von Säkkingen (The Trumpeter of Säckingen) (1853), a romantic and humorous tale which immediately gained extraordinary popularity. It reached more than 250 editions and was made into an opera by Viktor Nessler in 1884. Scheffel next undertook a journey to Italy.

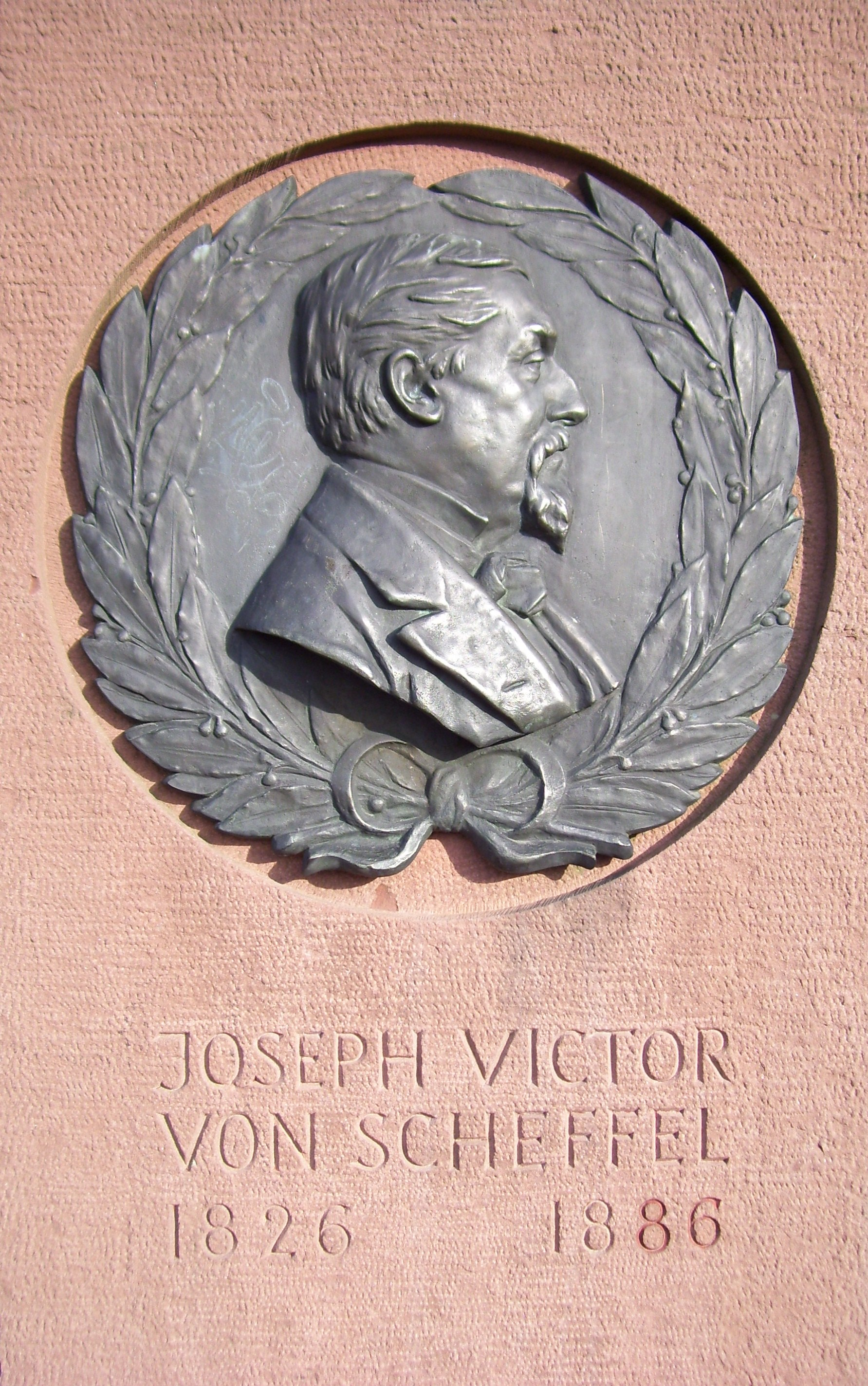
Memorial to von Scheffel in the Heidelberg Castle Court Garden (Hortus Palatinus)

Returning home in 1853 he found his parents more than ever anxious that he should continue his legal career. But in 1854, defective eyesight incapacitated him; he quit the government service and took up his residence at Heidelberg, with the intention of preparing himself for a post on the teaching staff of the university. His studies were, however, interrupted by eye disease, and in search of health he travelled to Switzerland and took up residence at Lake Constance, and elaborated the plan of his famous historical romance Ekkehard (1855); (Eng. translation by Sofie Delffs, Leipzig, 1872). Part of this work was later used by Max Bruch as the libretto for his cantata The Lay of the Norsemen. The first ideas for this work he got from the Monumenta Germaniae Historica. Ekkehard was almost as popular than the Trompeter von Säkkingen. In 1901, it reached the 179th edition.

Scheffel next returned to Heidelberg, and published Gaudeamus, Lieder aus dem Engeren und Weiteren (1868), a collection of joyous and humorous songs, the subject matter of which is taken partly from German legends and partly from historical subjects. In these songs the author shows himself the light-hearted student, a friend of wine and song; and their success is unexampled in German literature and encouraged numerous imitators. One example is "Im schwarzen Walfisch zu Askalon" where the lyrics reflect an endorsement of the bacchanalian mayhem of student life. The song describes an 'old assyrian' drinking binge with some references to the Classics and the large invoice presented in cuneiform on six brick stones. However, the carouser has to admit that he left his money already in an inn in Nineveh and gets kicked out. In typical manner of Scheffel, it contains an anachronistic mixture of various times and eras and parodistic notions on current science.

Scheffel's life was marked by disappointments: the unsuccessful German revolution of 1848 and his unsuccessful courting of Emma Heim in 1851. He also used natural science to mock the political environment, as he mocked Hegel with his guano poem or referred to the course of time in his Ichthyosaurus poem. Indirectly, Scheffel coined the expression 'Biedermeier' for the pre-1848 age, as two of Scheffel poems Biedermanns Abendgemütlichkeit and Bummelmaiers Klage, based on the poetry of teacher and poet Samuel Friedrich Sauter, published 1848, were used in later satires about the reactionary petite bourgeoisie.

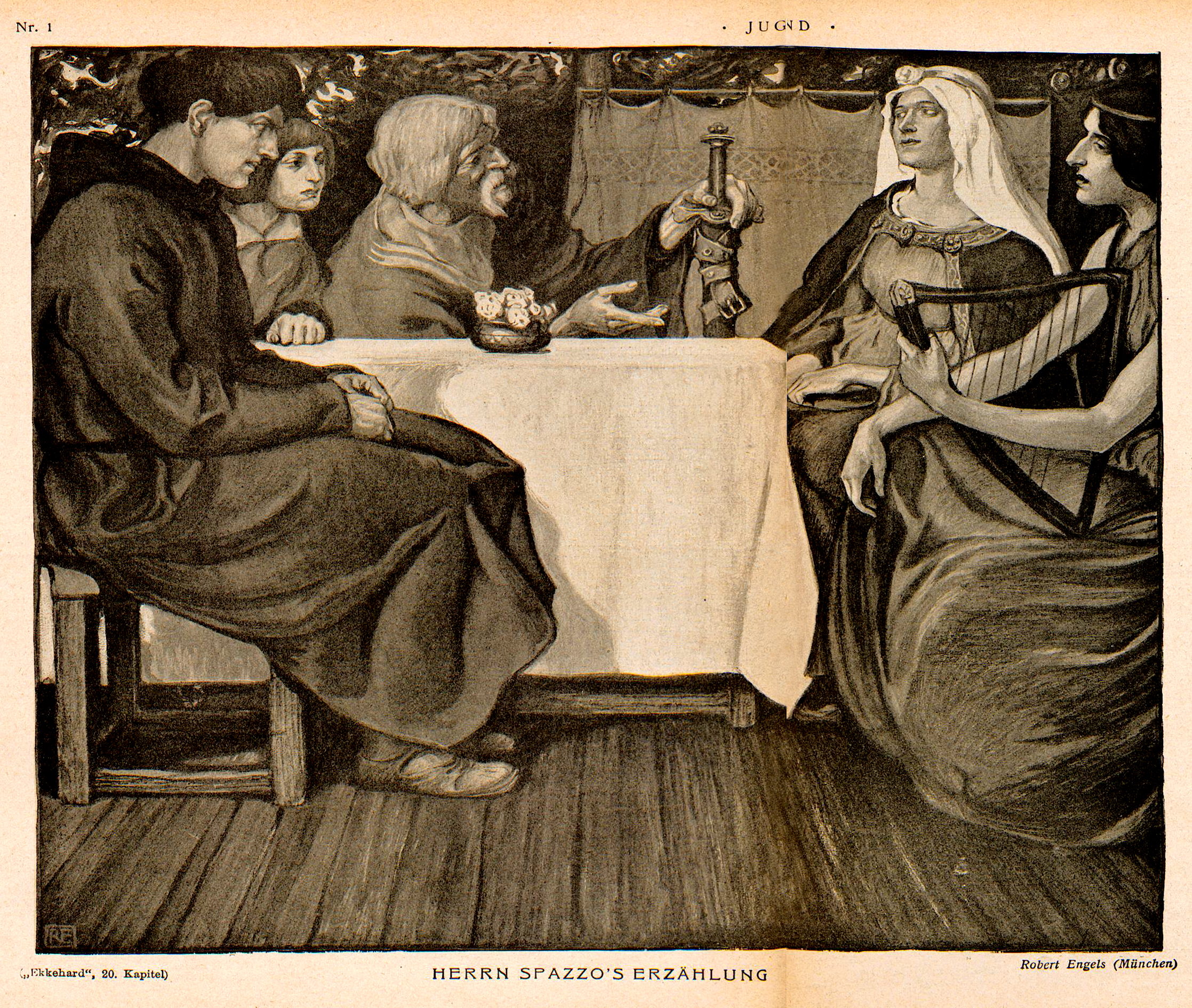
"Tale of Herr Spazzo", a story in Scheffel's Ekkehard, illustrated by Robert Engels for the magazine Jugend (1902)

For two years (1857–1859) Scheffel was custodian of the library of Prince Egon von Fürstenberg at Donaueschingen, but giving up his appointment in 1850, visited Joseph von Laßberg, at Meersburg at Lake Constance, stayed for a while with Charles Alexander, Grand Duke of Saxe-Weimar-Eisenach, at the Wartburg in Thuringia, then, settling at Karlsruhe, he married in 1864 Caroline von Malzen, and, in 1872, retired to his Villa Seehalde near Radolfzell at the lower Lake Constance. On the occasion of his jubilee (1876), which was celebrated all over Germany, he was granted a patent of hereditary nobility by the grand duke of Baden. He died at Karlsruhe on 9 April 1886.

== Legacy ==
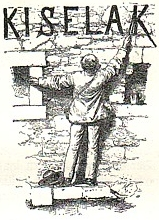
Joseph Kyselak was described in Scheffels poem "Aggstein", illustration about 1860

1891 Joseph Stöckle (1844–1893) founded the Scheffelbund in Schwetzingen (now Karlsruhe), the largest literary society in Germany with about 7000 members. The Scheffelprize is dedicated to excellent pupils. There are various Scheffel memorials, street and place names. The Scheffel Archive is partially at the Scheffelbund and partially at the Baden State Library.

== Works ==
His works, other than those already mentioned, are:

- Frau Aventiure. Lieder aus Heinrich von Ofterdingens Zeit (1863)
- Juniperus. Geschichte eines Kreuzfahrers (1866)
- Bergpsalmen (1870)
- Waldeinsamkeit (1880)
- Der Heini von Steier (1883)
- Hugideo, eine alte Geschichte (1884)

Volumes of Reisebilder (1887); Epistein (1892); and Briefe (1898) were published posthumously. Scheffel's Gesammelte Werke have been published in six volumes (1907).

=== Editions in English ===
- Ekkehard. A tale of the tenth century. Translated from the German by Sofie Delffs. In: German Authors. Collection of German Authors. (Tauchnitz edition.) vols. 21–22. 1867.
- Ekkehard. Translated by Helena Easson, Everyman's Library, 1940.
- Charles Godfrey Leland, Gaudeamus! Humorous Poems by Joseph Viktor von Scheffel, Ebook-Nr. 35848 on gutenberg.org
