= Adams vs. Jefferson =

Adams vs. Jefferson may refer to one of two United States presidential elections between John Adams and Thomas Jefferson:

- 1796 United States presidential election, won by John Adams against Thomas Jefferson
- 1800 United States presidential election, won by Thomas Jefferson against John Adams
