= 1796 United States presidential election in New York =

- November 7, 1796
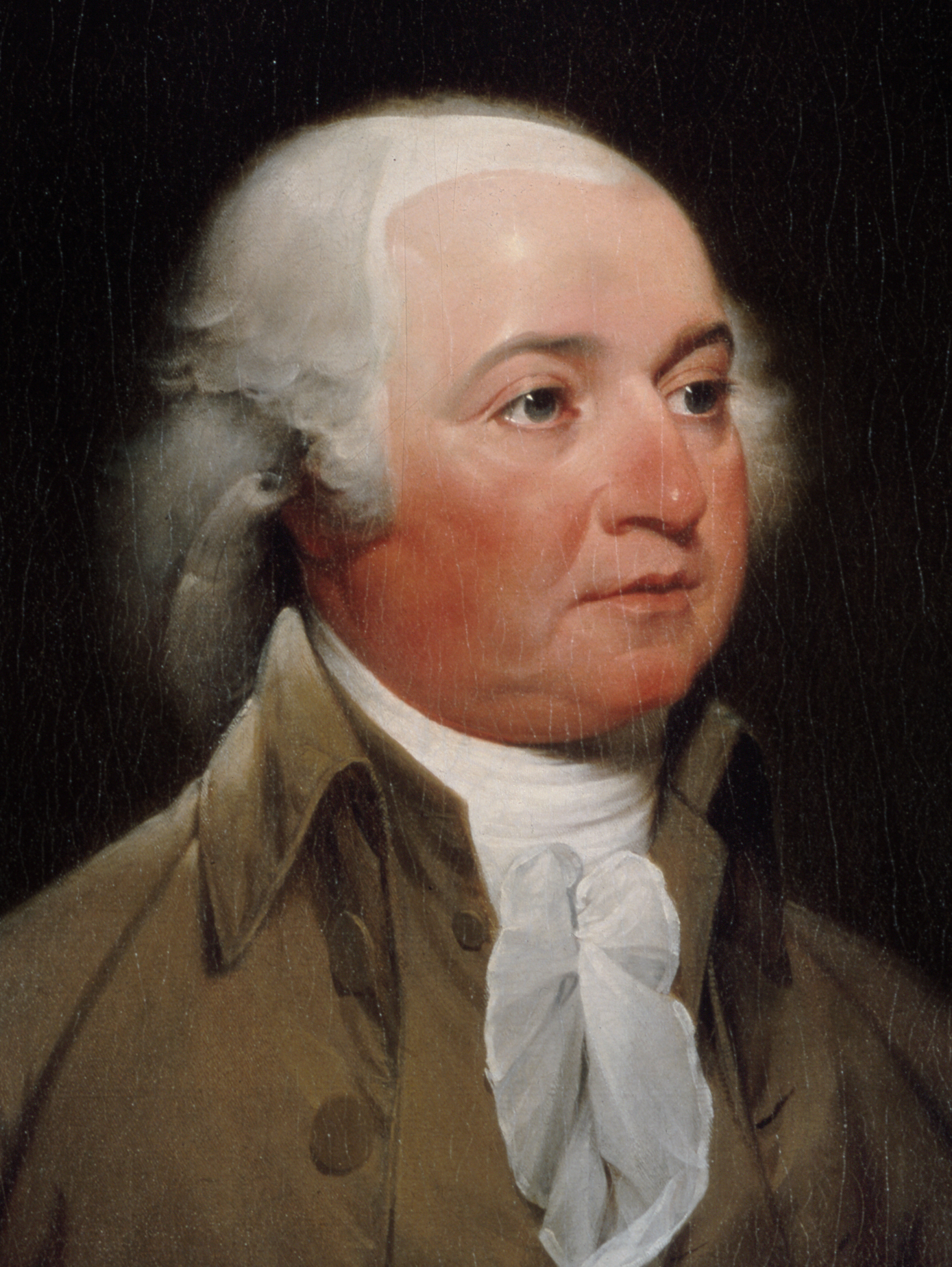
Nominee	John Adams
Party	Federalist
Home state	Massachusetts
Running mate	Thomas Pinckney
Electoral vote	12
Percentage	100.00%
President before election
George Washington
Independent
Elected President
John Adams
Federalist

A presidential election was held in New York on November 7, 1796, as part of the 1796 United States presidential election. The state legislature chose 12 representatives, or electors to the Electoral College, who voted for President and Vice President.

During this election, New York cast 12 electoral votes for Vice President John Adams.

== See also ==
- United States presidential elections in New York
