= 1796 United States presidential election in New Jersey =

- November 4 – December 7, 1796
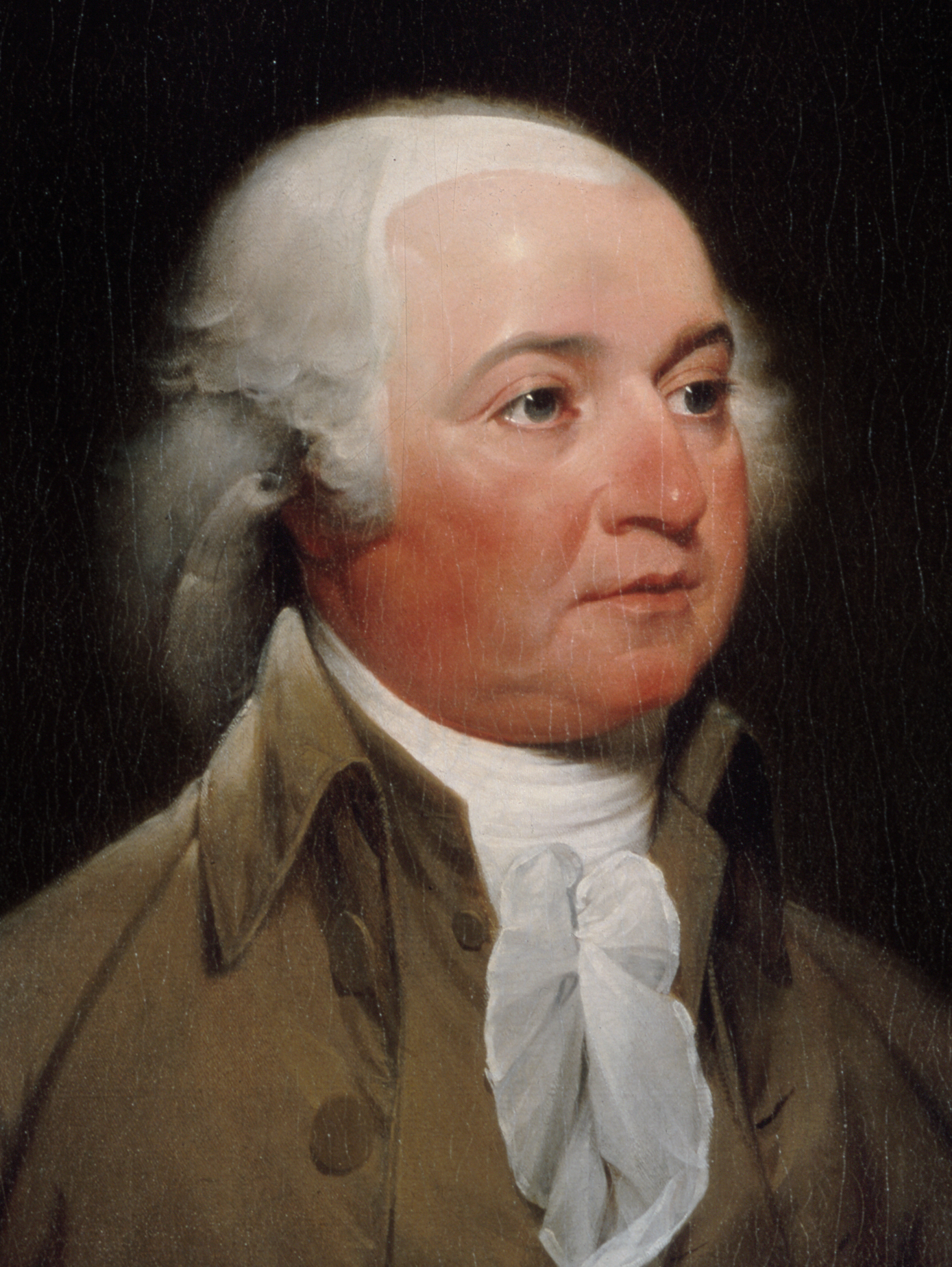

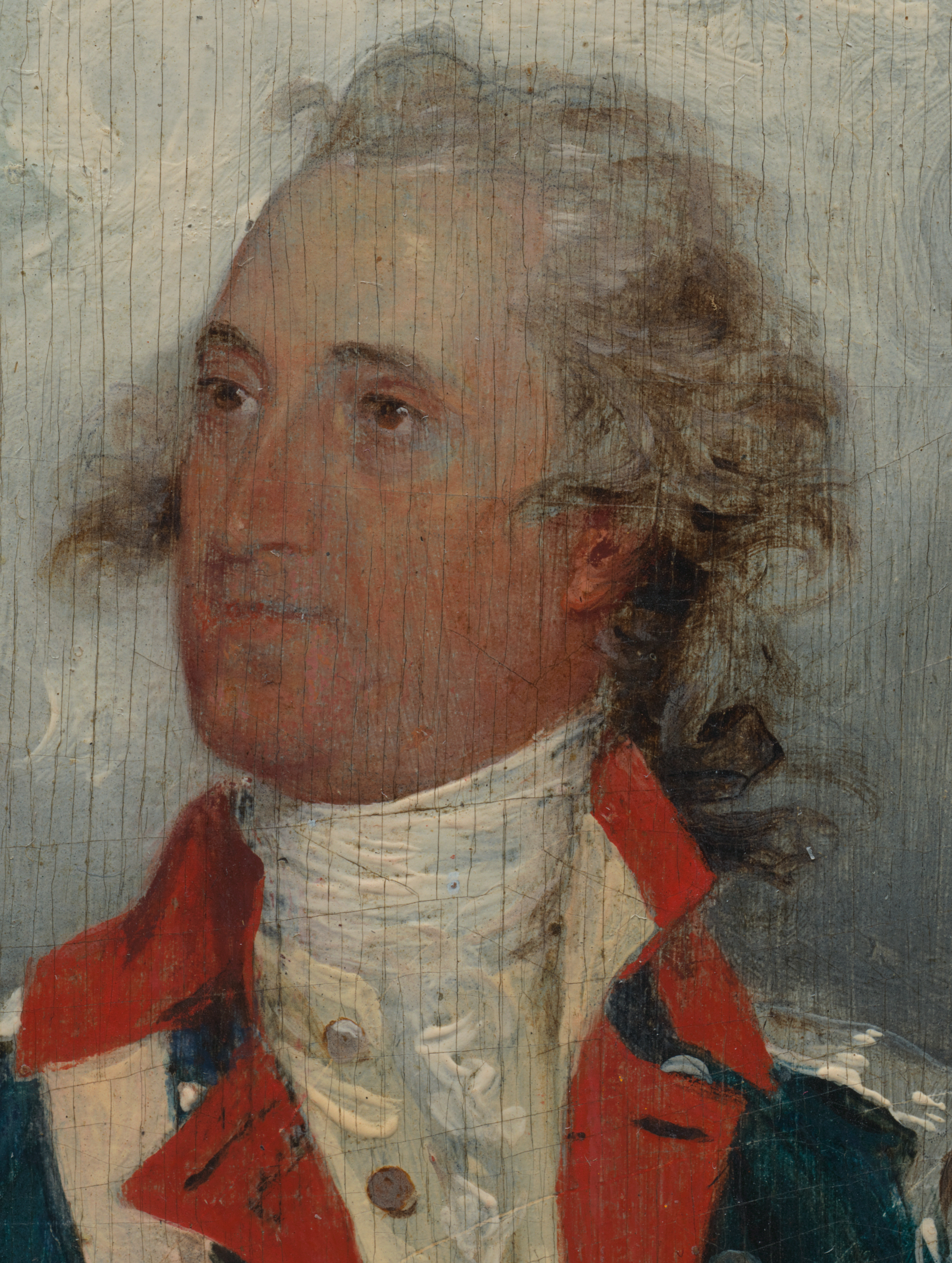
Nominee	John Adams	Thomas Pinckney
Party	Federalist	Federalist
Home state	Massachusetts	South Carolina
Electoral vote	7	7
Percentage	100.00%	–
President before election
George Washington
Independent
Elected President
John Adams
Federalist

A presidential election was held in New Jersey between November 4 and December 7, 1796, as part of the 1796 United States presidential election. The state legislature chose seven representatives, or electors to the Electoral College, who voted for President and Vice President.

During this election, New Jersey cast seven electoral votes for incumbent vice president John Adams.

== See also ==
- United States presidential elections in New Jersey
