= 1796 United States presidential election in Connecticut =

- November 4 – December 7, 1796
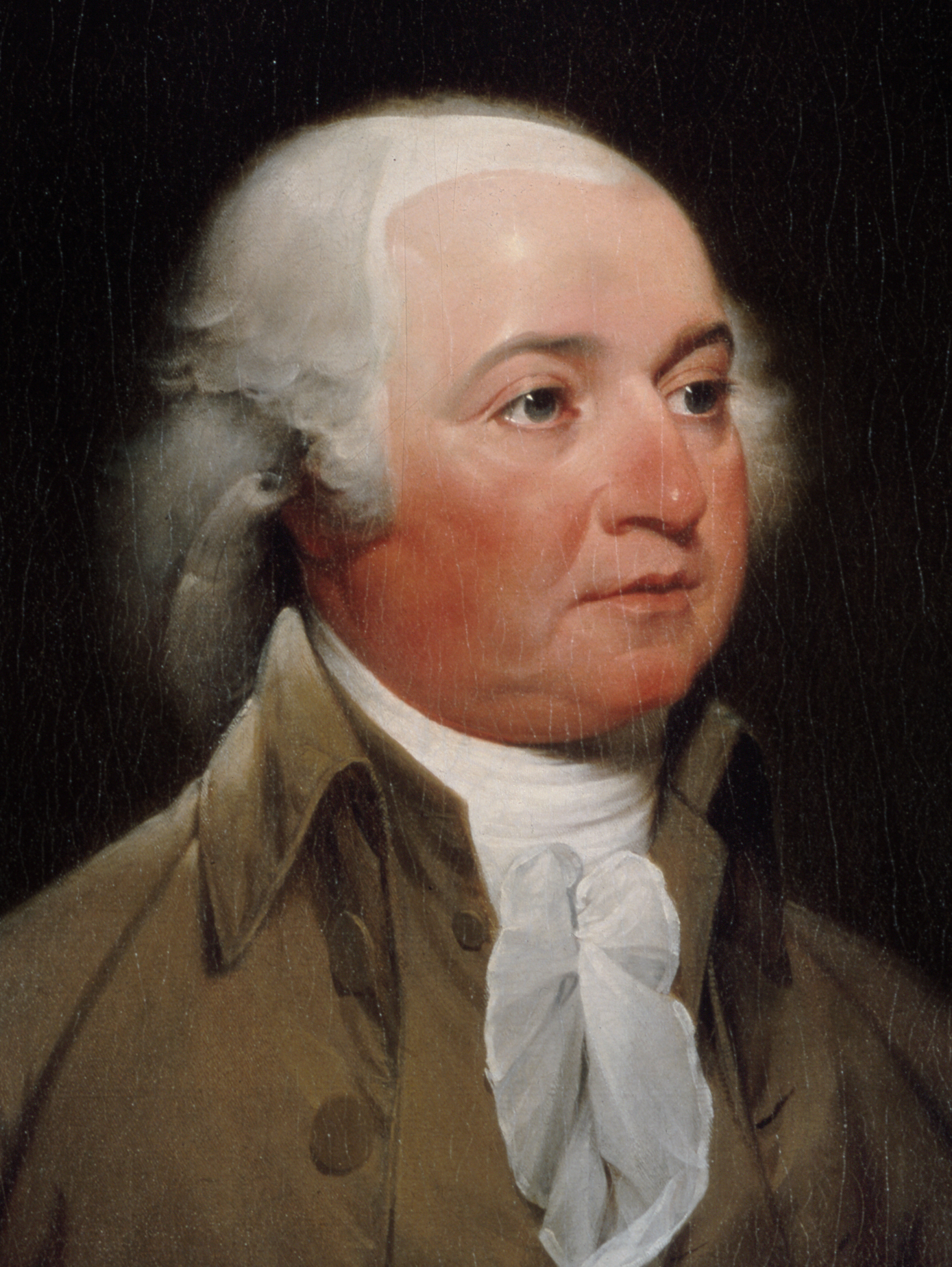

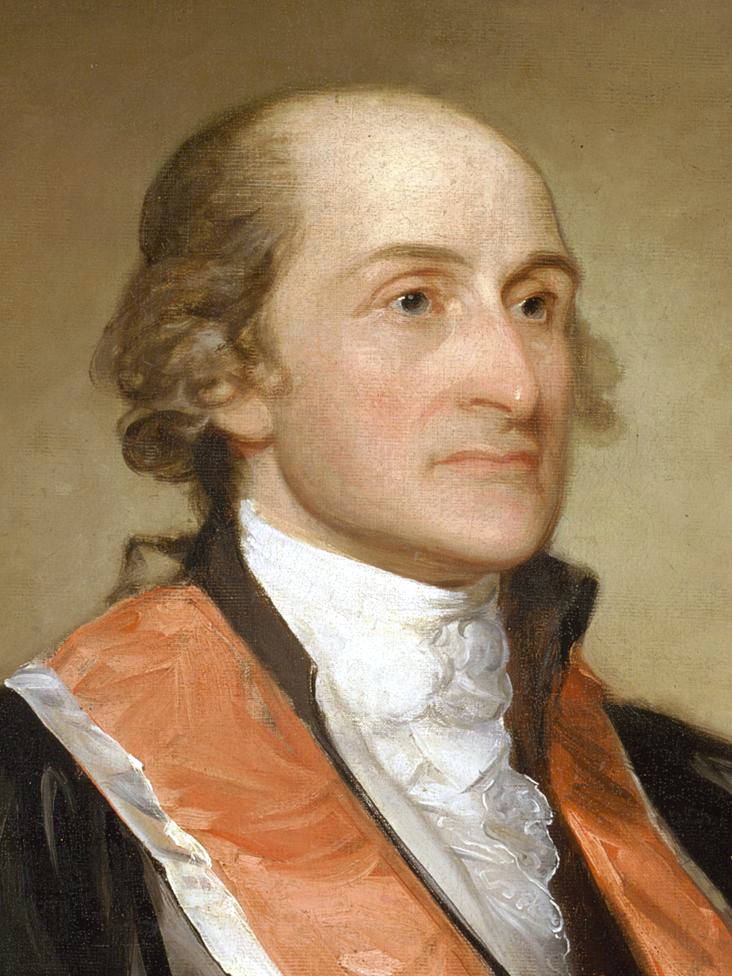

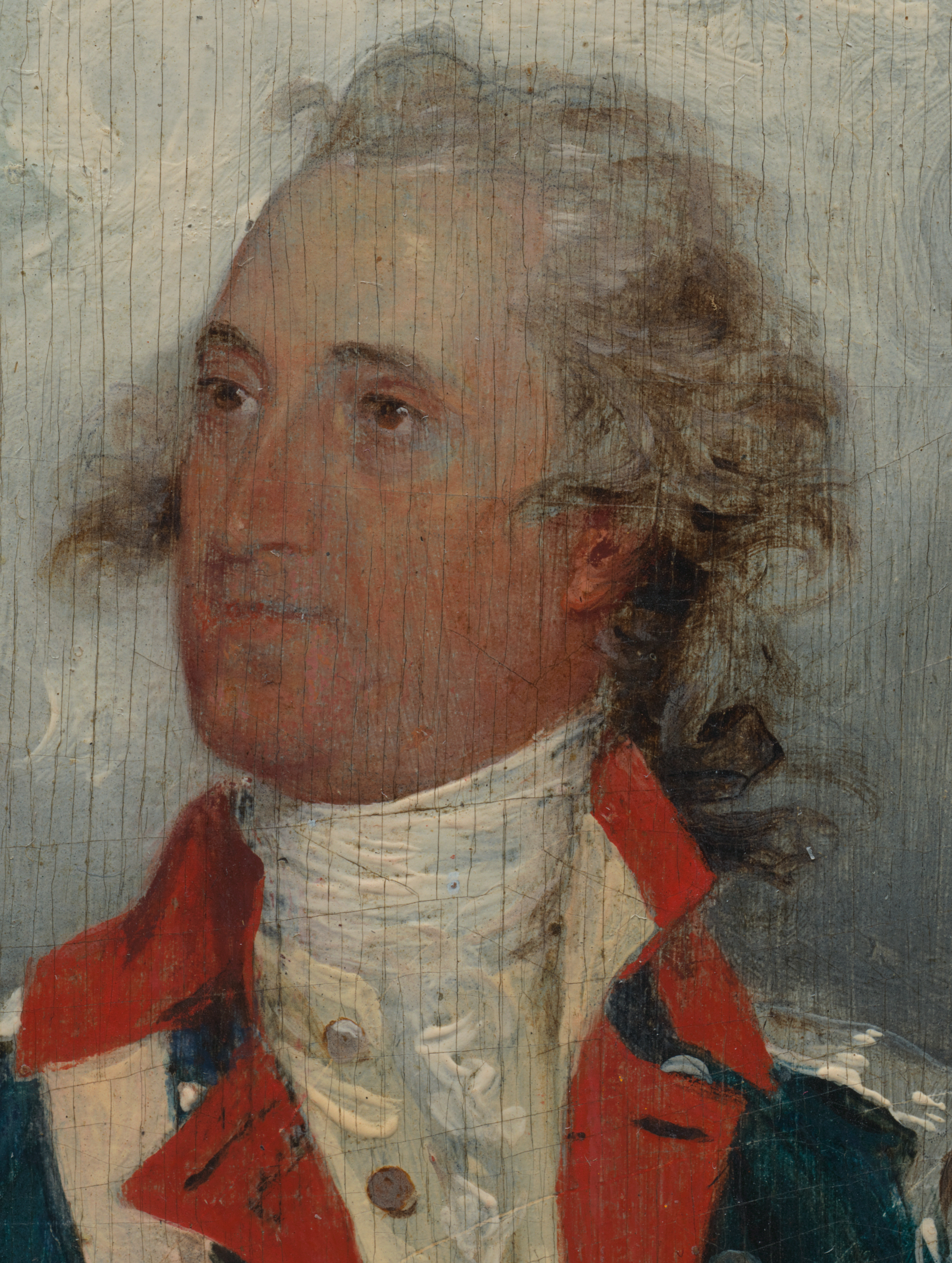
Nominee	John Adams	John Jay	Thomas Pinckney
Party	Federalist	Federalist	Federalist
Home state	Massachusetts	New York	South Carolina
Electoral vote	9	5	4
Percentage	100.00%	–	–
President before election
George Washington
Independent
Elected President
John Adams
Federalist

A presidential election was held in Connecticut between November 4 and December 7, 1796, as part of the 1796 United States presidential election. The state legislature chose nine representatives, or electors, to the Electoral College, who voted for President and Vice President.

Connecticut cast nine electoral votes for New England native John Adams.

== See also ==
- United States presidential elections in Connecticut
