= 1796 United States presidential election in Vermont =

- November 4 – December 7, 1796
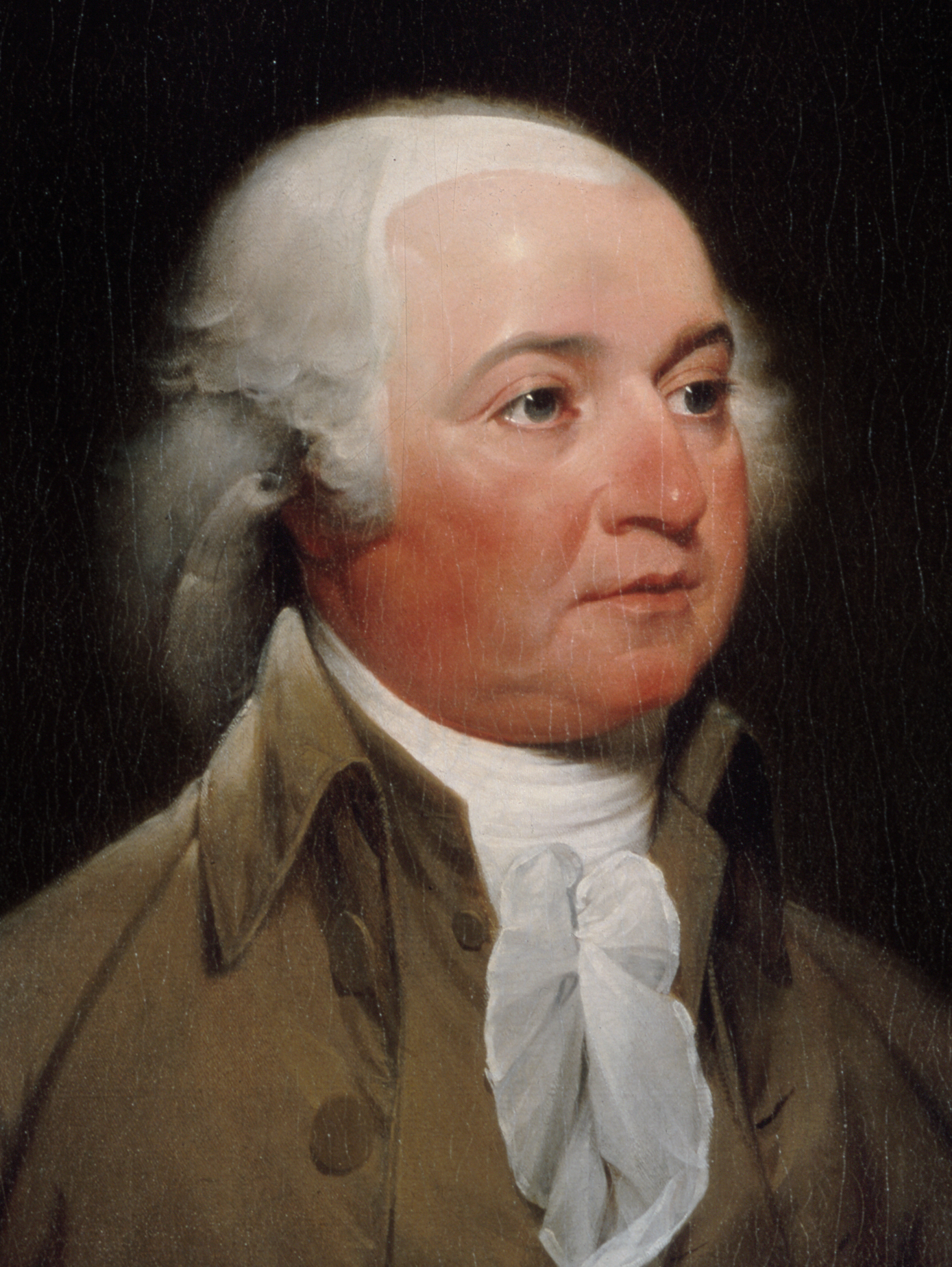

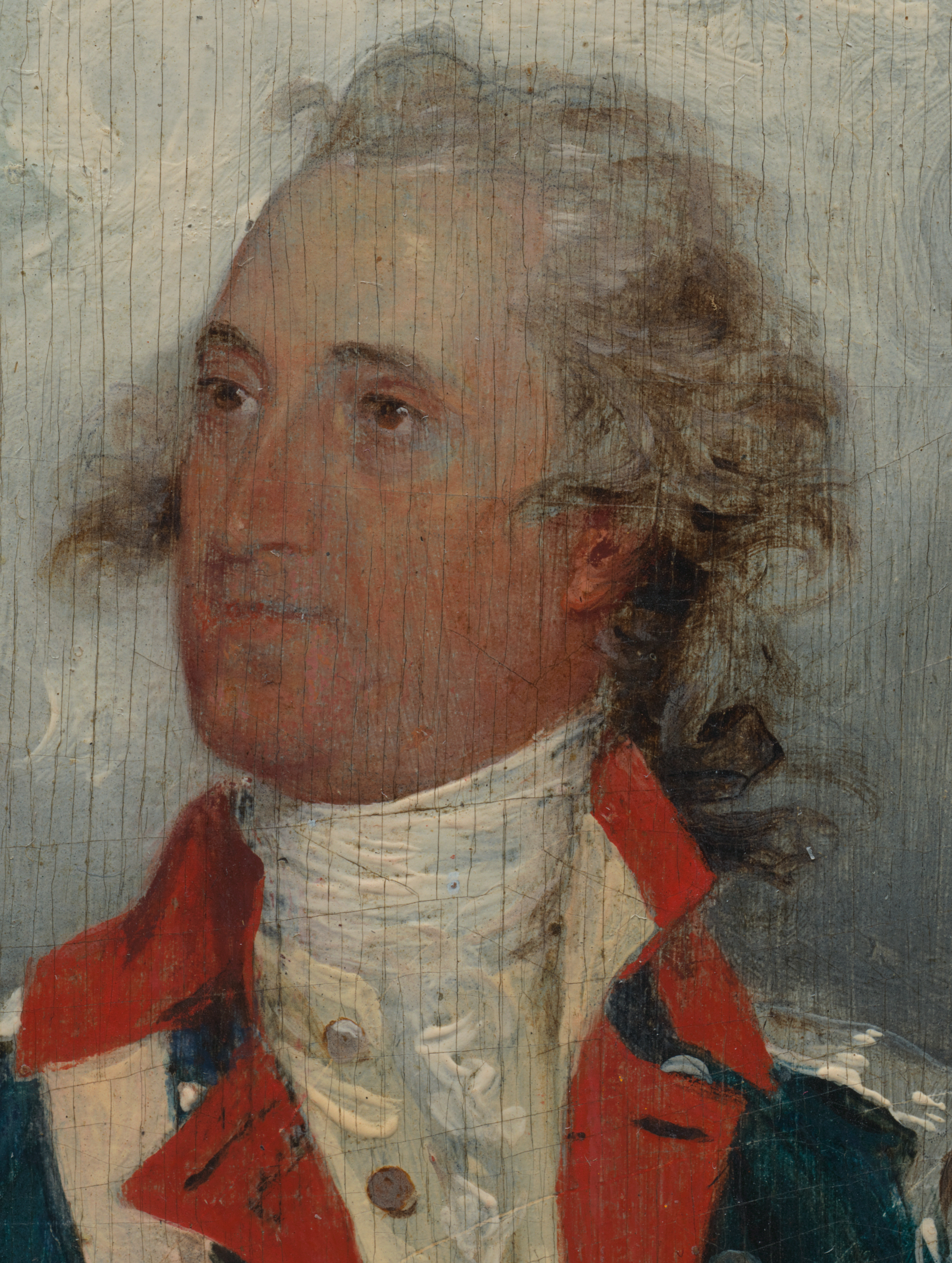
| Nominee | John Adams | Thomas Pinckney |
| Party | Federalist | Federalist |
| Home state | Massachusetts | South Carolina |
| Electoral vote | 4 | 4 |
| Percentage | 100.00% | – |
President before election
George Washington
Independent
Elected President
John Adams
Federalist

A presidential election was held in Vermont between November 4 and December 7, 1796, as part of the 1796 United States presidential election. The state legislature chose four representatives, or electors to the Electoral College, who voted for President and Vice President.

During this election, Vermont cast four electoral votes for vice president and New England native John Adams.

== See also ==
- United States presidential elections in Vermont
