= 1796 United States presidential election in Rhode Island =

- November 4 – December 7, 1796
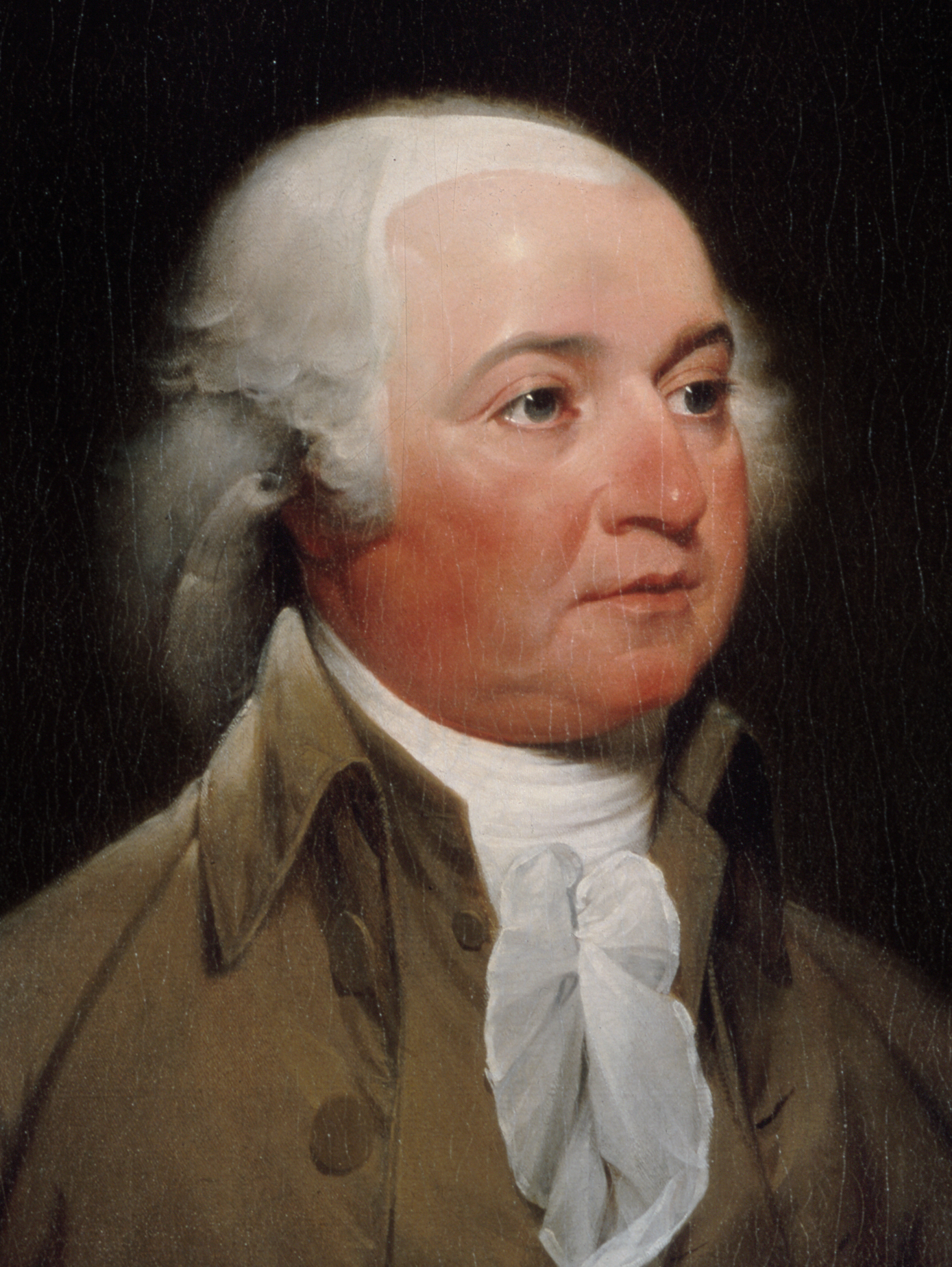
Nominee	John Adams
Party	Federalist
Home state	Massachusetts
Running mate	Thomas Pinckney
Electoral vote	4
Percentage	100.00%
President before election
George Washington
Independent
Elected President
John Adams
Federalist

A presidential election was held in Rhode Island between November 4 to December 7, 1796, as part of the 1796 United States presidential election. Voters chose four representatives, or electors to the Electoral College who voted for president and vice president.

During this election, Rhode Island cast its four electoral votes for John Adams.

== Results ==
1796 United States presidential election in Rhode Island
Party	Candidate	Votes	Percentage	Electoral votes
Federalist	John Adams	—	—	4
Totals		—	—	4

== See also ==
- United States presidential elections in Rhode Island
