= 1796 United States presidential election in North Carolina =

- November 4 – December 7, 1796
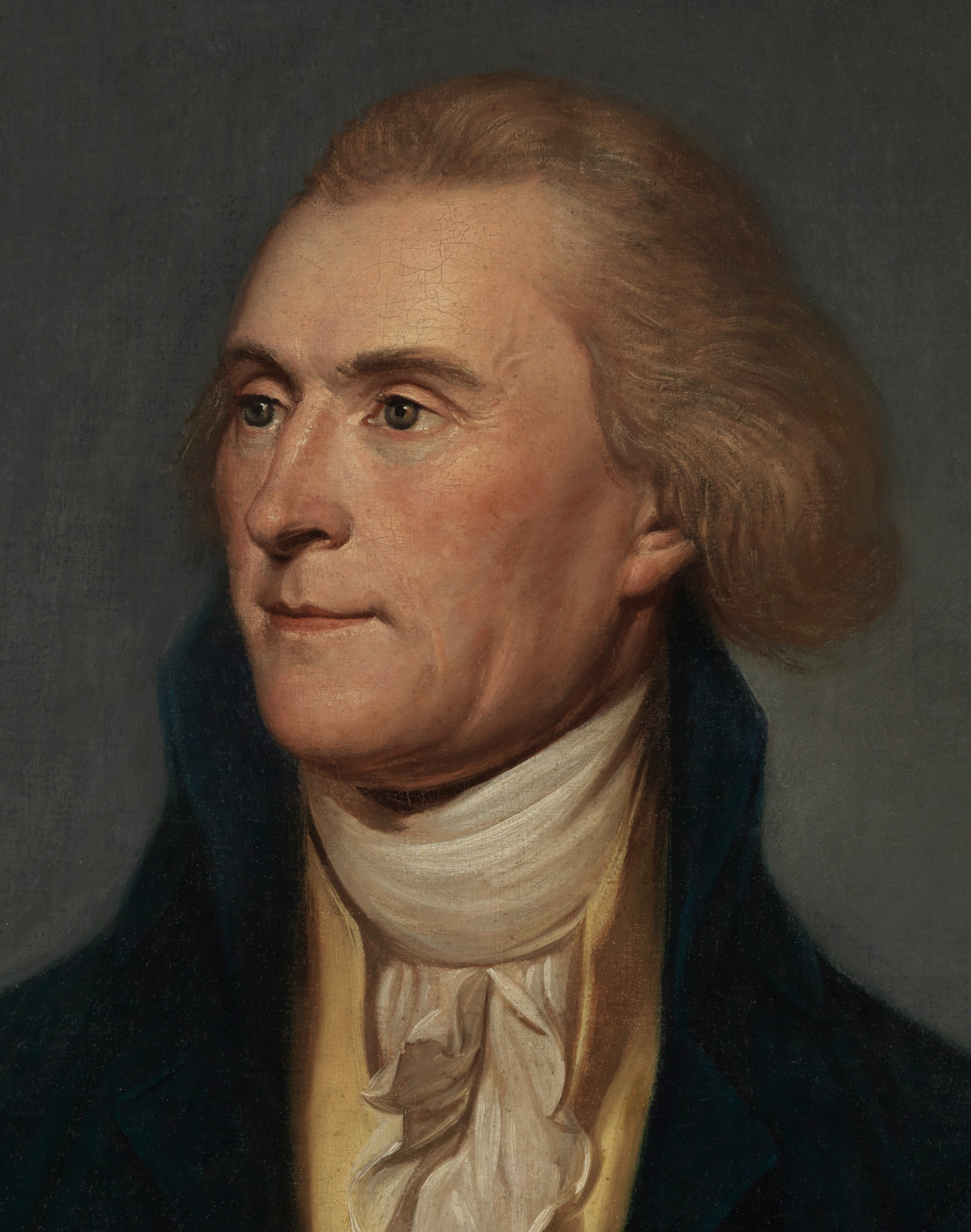

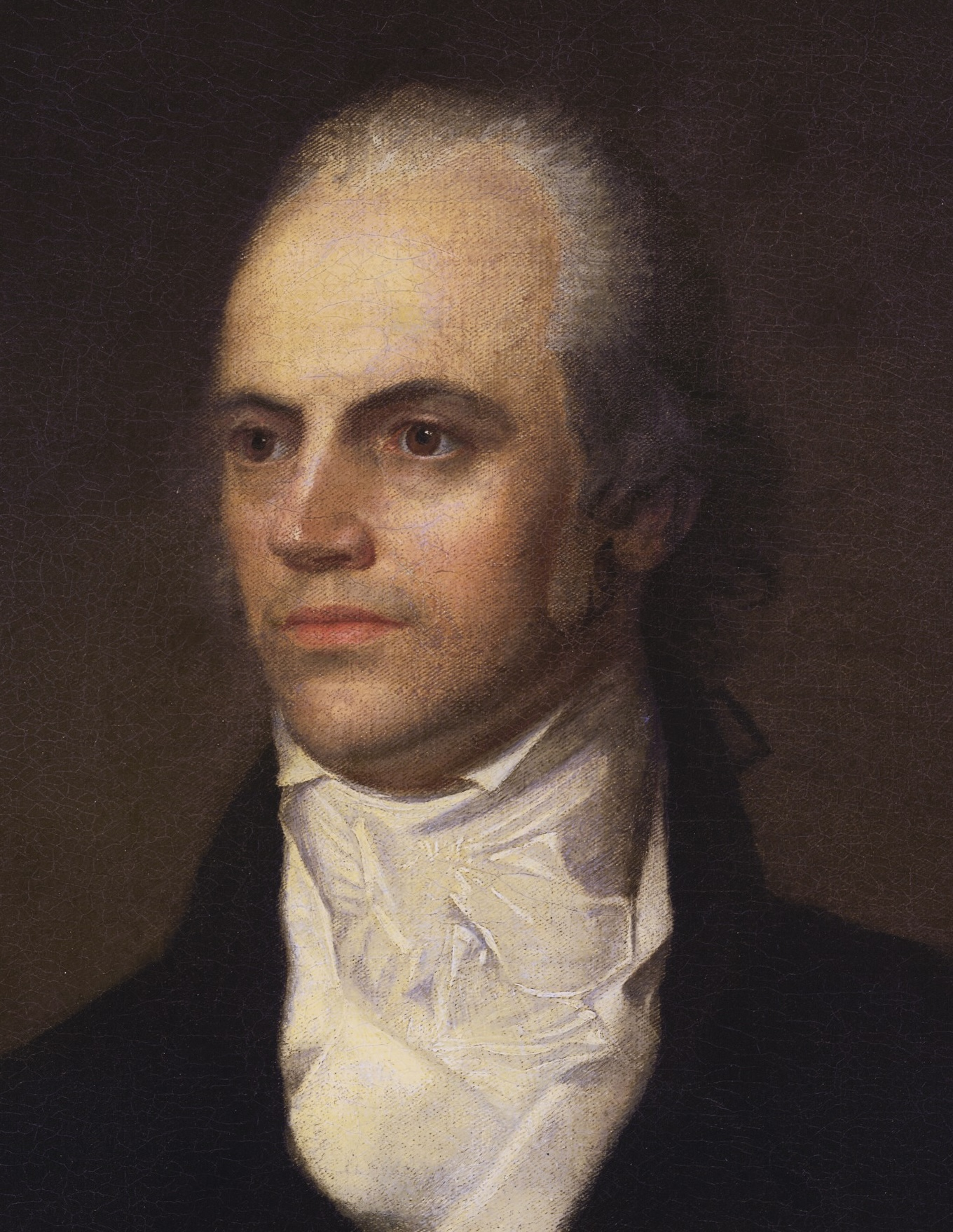
Nominee	Thomas Jefferson	Aaron Burr
Party	Democratic-Republican	Democratic-Republican
Home state	Virginia	New York
Electoral vote	11	6
President before election
George Washington
Independent
Elected President
John Adams
Federalist

A presidential election was held in North Carolina between November 4 until December 7, 1796, as part of the 1796 United States presidential election. 12 members of the Electoral College were allocated to the presidential candidates.

Democratic-Republican candidate Thomas Jefferson won and carried North Carolina by 11 electoral votes.

== Results ==
Jefferson won 11 votes, but the remaining 13 were spread among six different candidates from both parties.

1796 United States presidential election in North Carolina
Party	Candidate	Electoral votes
Democratic-Republican	Thomas Jefferson	11
Democratic-Republican	Aaron Burr	6
Federalist	James Iredell	3
Federalist	John Adams	1
Federalist	Thomas Pinckney	1
Independent	George Washington	1
Federalist	Charles Cotesworth Pinckney	1
Totals		24

== See also ==
- United States presidential elections in North Carolina
