= 1796 United States presidential election in Kentucky =

- November 4 – December 7, 1796
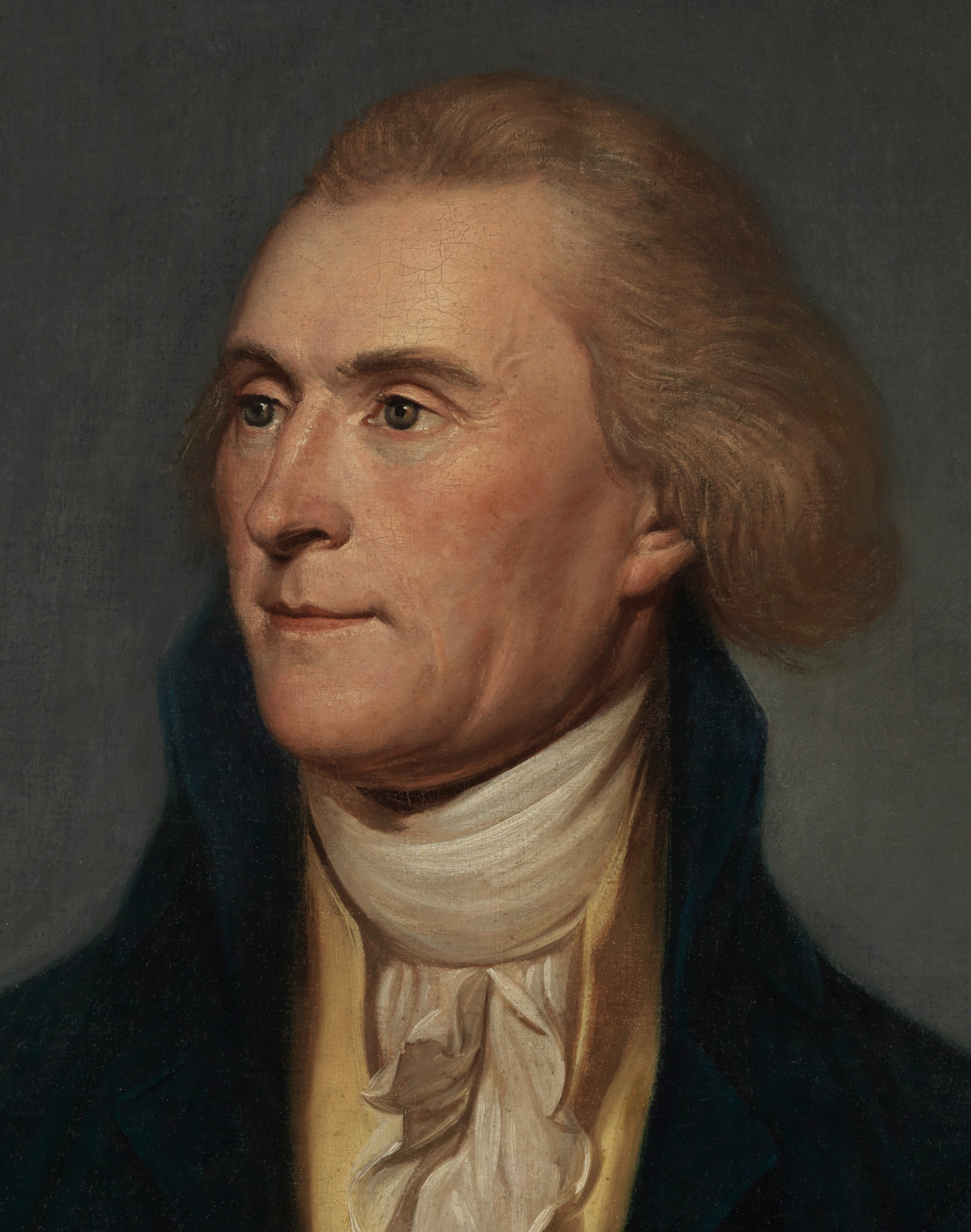

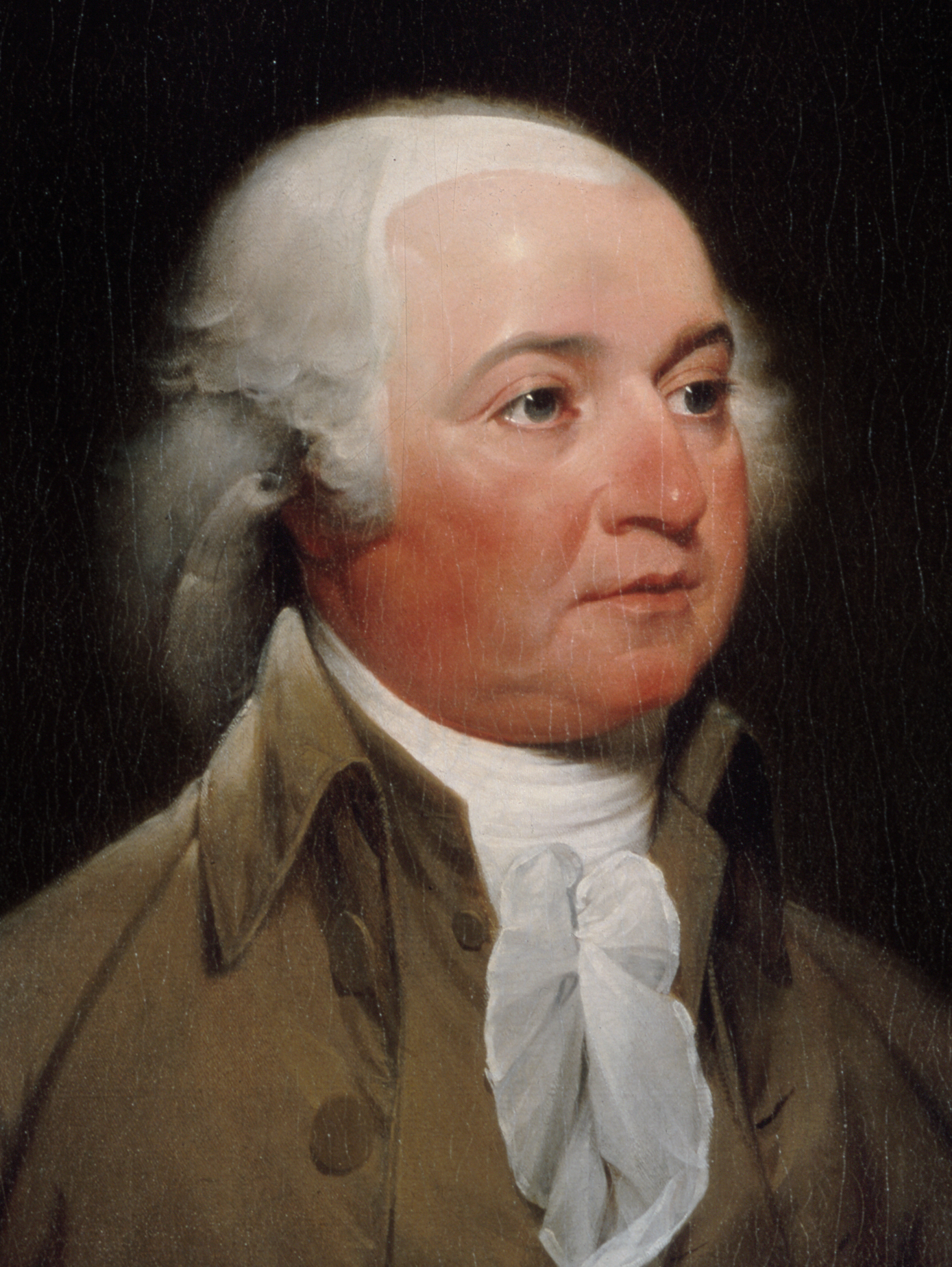
Nominee	Thomas Jefferson	John Adams
Party	Democratic-Republican	Federalist
Home state	Virginia	Massachusetts
Running mate	Aaron Burr	Thomas Pinckney
Electoral vote	4	0
Percentage	100.00%	0.00%

A presidential election was held in Kentucky between November 4 and December 7, 1796, as part of the 1796 United States presidential election. The voters chose four representatives, or electors to the Electoral College, who voted for President and Vice President.

Kentucky cast four electoral votes for the Democratic-Republican candidate Thomas Jefferson over the Federalist candidate and incumbent Vice President John Adams. The electoral votes for Vice president were cast for Jefferson's running mate Aaron Burr from New York. The state was divided into four electoral districts with one elector each, whereupon each district's voters chose the electors.

== Results ==
1796 United States presidential election in Kentucky
Party	Candidate	Votes	Percentage	Electoral votes
Democratic-Republican	Thomas Jefferson	—	100.00%	4
Federalist	John Adams	—	0.00%	0
Totals		—	100.00%	4

== See also ==
- United States presidential elections in Kentucky
