= 1796 United States presidential election in Georgia =

- November 4, 1796
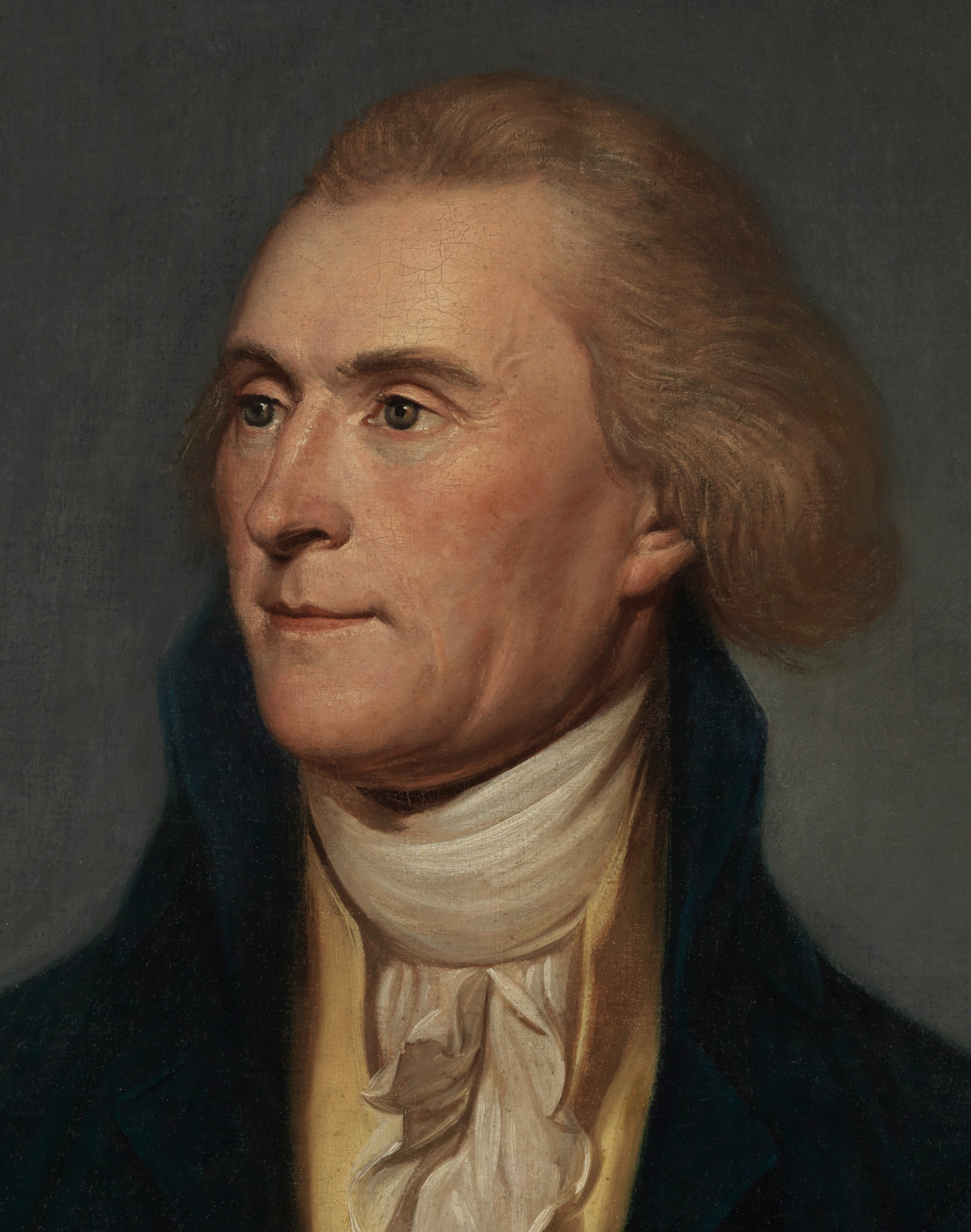
Nominee	Thomas Jefferson
Party	Democratic-Republican
Home state	Virginia
Running mate	Aaron Burr
Electoral vote	4
Popular vote	6,246
Percentage	100.00%
County results
Jefferson
50–60%
60–70%
70–80%
80–90%
90–100%
Adams
50–60%
60–90%
90–100%
No data
Yazoo lands

A presidential election was held in Georgia on November 4, 1796, as part of the 1796 United States presidential election. The voters chose four representatives, or electors, through plurality block voting to the Electoral College. These electors then voted for president and vice president.

Out of 51 elector candidates, four Democratic-Republican electors were elected who then voted for Thomas Jefferson over the Federalist candidate and incumbent Vice President John Adams. The electoral votes for vice president were, however, not cast for Jefferson's running mate Aaron Burr, but for George Clinton from New York.

== Results by presidential candidates ==
1796 United States presidential election in Georgia
Party	Candidate	Votes	%
Democratic-Republican	Thomas Jefferson	6,246	100.00%
Total votes		6,246	100.00%

=== Results by county ===
1796 United States presidential election in Georgia
County	Thomas Jefferson Democratic-Republican		Margin		Total (Note: Direct results for Thomas Jefferson and John Adams are taken from the highest voted elector with either a formal ticket pledge, or a submitted electoral vote, for each county.)
County	#	%	#	%	Total
Bulloch	13	100.00%	13	100.00%	13
Burke	606	100.00%	606	100.00%	606
Chatham	350	100.00%	350	100.00%	350
Columbia	418	100.00%	418	100.00%	418
Elbert	478	100.00%	478	100.00%	478
Effingham	129	100.00%	129	100.00%	129
Franklin	392	100.00%	392	100.00%	392
Greene	270	100.00%	270	100.00%	270
Hancock	739	100.00%	739	100.00%	739
Jackson	161	100.00%	161	100.00%	161
Jefferson	509	100.00%	509	100.00%	509
Liberty	85	100.00%	85	100.00%	85
Lincoln	166	100.00%	166	100.00%	166
Montgomery	No votes		No votes		
Oglethorpe	454	100.00%	454	100.00%	454
Richmond	234	100.00%	234	100.00%	234
Screven	108	100.00%	108	100.00%	108
Warren	337	100.00%	337	100.00%	337
Washington	214	100.00%	214	100.00%	214
Wilkes	583	100.00%	583	100.00%	583
Total	6,246	100.00%	6,246	100.00%	6,246

=== Results by district ===
1796 United States presidential election in Georgia
District	E.V.	Thomas Jefferson Democratic-Republican			Margin		Total (Note: Direct results for Thomas Jefferson and John Adams are taken from the highest voted elector with either a formal ticket pledge, or a submitted electoral vote, for each district.)
District	E.V.	#	%	E.V.	#	%	Total
At-large	4	6,246	100.00%	4	6,246	100.00%	6,246
Total	4	6,246	100.00%	4	6,426	100.00%	6,246

== Results by presidential electors ==
1796 United States presidential election in Georgia
Party	Candidate	Votes	%
Democratic-Republican	Democratic-Republican electors	6,246	65.92%
Federalist	Federalist electors	3,229	34.08%
Total votes		9,475	100.00%

=== Results by county ===
1796 United States presidential election in Georgia
County	Democratic-Republican electors		Federalist electors		Margin		Total (Note: Results are taken from the highest voted Federalist, and Democratic-Republican elector for each county.)
County	#	%	#	%	#	%	Total
Bulloch	13	52.00%	12	48.00%	1	4.00%	25
Burke	606	90.31%	65	9.69%	541	80.62%	671
Chatham	350	72.61%	132	27.39%	218	45.22%	482
Columbia	418	57.81%	305	42.19%	113	15.62%	723
Elbert	478	80.07%	119	19.93%	359	60.14%	597
Effingham	129	84.31%	24	15.69%	105	68.62%	153
Franklin	392	62.62%	234	37.38%	158	25.24%	626
Greene	270	52.73%	242	47.27%	28	5.46%	512
Hancock	739	91.80%	66	8.20%	673	83.60%	805
Jackson	161	61.69%	100	38.31%	61	23.38%	261
Jefferson	509	57.84%	371	42.16%	138	15.68%	880
Liberty	85	96.59%	3	3.41%	82	93.18%	88
Lincoln	166	59.29%	114	40.71%	52	18.58%	280
Montgomery	0	0.00%	18	100.00%	-18	-100.00%	18
Oglethorpe	454	68.37%	210	31.63%	244	36.74%	664
Richmond	234	40.55%	343	59.45%	-109	-18.90%	577
Screven	108	78.26%	30	21.74%	78	56.52%	138
Warren	337	72.63%	127	27.37%	210	45.26%	464
Washington	214	82.95%	44	17.05%	170	65.90%	258
Wilkes	583	46.53%	670	53.47%	-87	-6.94%	1,253
Total	6,246	65.92%	3,229	34.08%	3,017	31.84%	9,475

=== Results by district ===
1796 United States presidential election in Georgia
District	E.V.	Democratic-Republican electors			Federalist electors			Margin		Total (Note: Results are taken from the highest voted Federalist, and Democratic-Republican elector for each district.)
District	E.V.	#	%	E.V.	#	%	E.V.	#	%	Total
At-large	4	6,246	65.92%	4	3,229	34.08%	0	3,017	31.84%	9,475
Total	4	6,246	65.92%	4	3,229	34.08%	0	3,017	31.84%	9,475

=== Results by elector ===
1796 United States presidential election in Georgia
Party	Candidate	Votes	%
Democratic-Republican	James Jackson (Note: Democratic-Republican elector for this election.)	6,200	22.18%
Democratic-Republican	Edward Telfair	4,610	16.49%
Democratic-Republican	Charles Abercrombie	4,357	15.59%
Democratic-Republican	William Barnett	3,965	14.18%
Federalist	Thomas Glascock (Note: Federalist elector for this election.)	2,644	9.46%
Federalist	George Walton	2,357	8.43%
Federalist	John Milton	1,042	3.73%
Federalist	Burwell Pope	910	3.26%
Federalist	George Mathews	710	2.54%
Federalist	Benjamin Taliaferro (Note: Federalist elector for this election.)	249	0.89%
Federalist	Marshall	163	0.58%
Federalist	Medlock	127	0.45%
Federalist	John Berrien (Note: Federalist elector for this election)	126	0.45%
Federalist	Joseph Clay	104	0.37%
Unknown	Robert Watkins	79	0.28%
Unknown	James Jones	75	0.27%
Unknown	John Talbot	37	0.13%
Unknown	Thomas Napier	30	0.11%
Unknown	J. B. Sharp	26	0.09%
Unknown	John Mathews	21	0.08%
Unknown	William Few	20	0.07%
Unknown	Thomas Gibbons	14	0.05%
Unknown	Elijah Clarke	13	0.05%
Unknown	James Henricks	7	0.03%
Unknown	Johnston	7	0.03%
Unknown	Nicholas Long	7	0.03%
Unknown	Thomas P. Carnes	7	0.03%
Unknown	Edward Watts	5	0.02%
Unknown	Francis Willis	4	0.01%
Unknown	Irwin	4	0.01%
Unknown	Samuel Hammond	4	0.01%
Unknown	Irwin N. Fly	3	0.01%
Unknown	John Milledge	3	0.01%
Unknown	Abraham Baldwin	2	0.01%
Unknown	Hampton	2	0.01%
Unknown	Philip Clayton	2	0.01%
Unknown	Thomas Watkins	2	0.01%
Unknown	Butler	1	0.00%
Unknown	Ebenezer Jackson	1	0.00%
Unknown	Edward Jackson	1	0.00%
Unknown	George Jones	1	0.00%
Unknown	George Nailor	1	0.00%
Unknown	George Walker	1	0.00%
Unknown	Gibbons	1	0.00%
Unknown	James B. Maxwell	1	0.00%
Unknown	John Gibbons	1	0.00%
Unknown	John Mead	1	0.00%
Federalist	John Y. Noel	1	0.00%
Unknown	John Twiggs	1	0.00%
Unknown	Nathaniel Cooke	1	0.00%
Unknown	Noble W. Jones	1	0.00%
Unknown	Tatnall	1	0.00%
Unknown	Thomas Burke	1	0.00%
Unknown	Thomas McCall	1	0.00%
Total votes		27,955	100.00%

== See also ==
- United States presidential elections in Georgia
