= 1796 United States presidential election in Delaware =

- November 4 – December 7, 1796
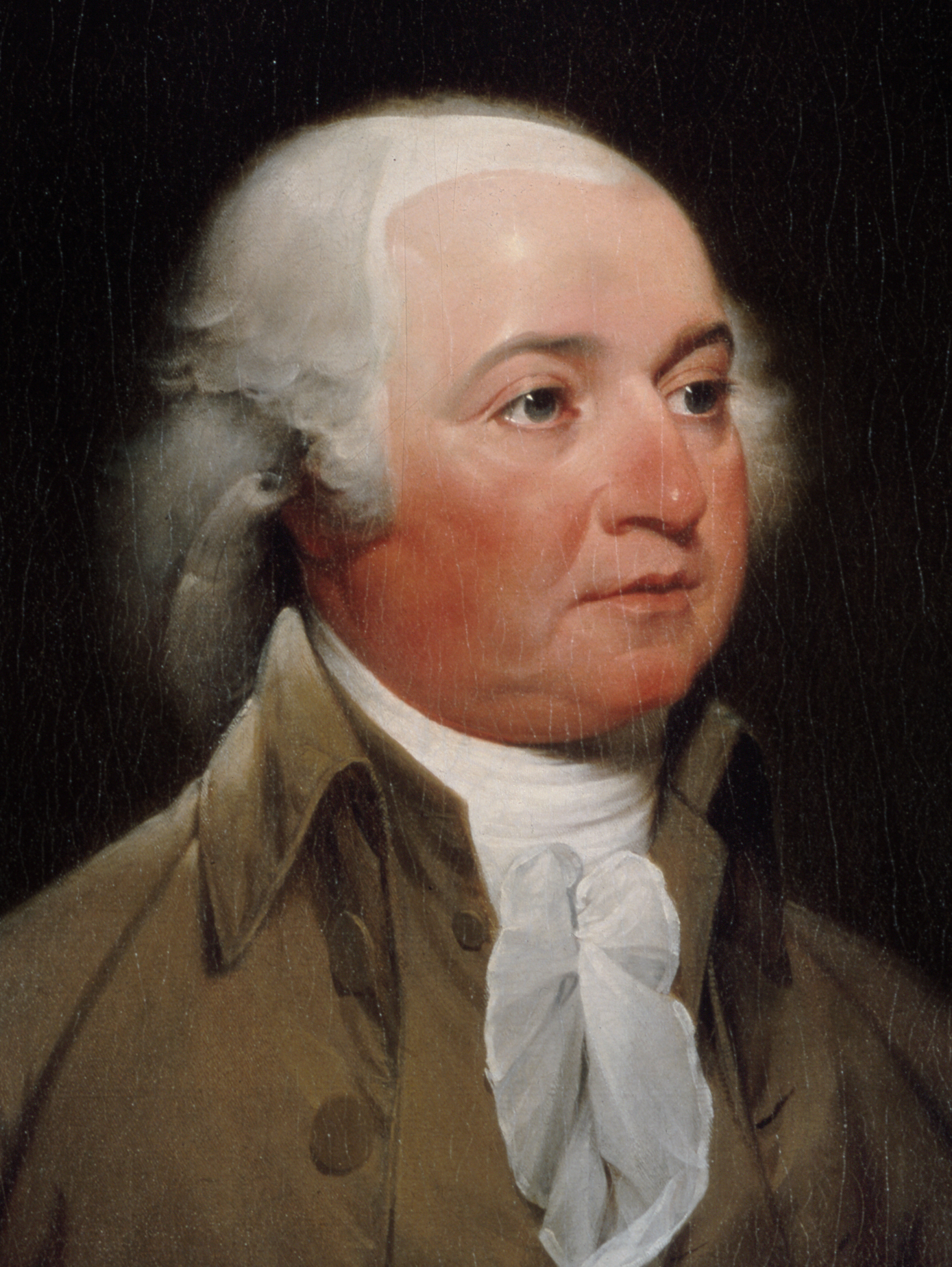

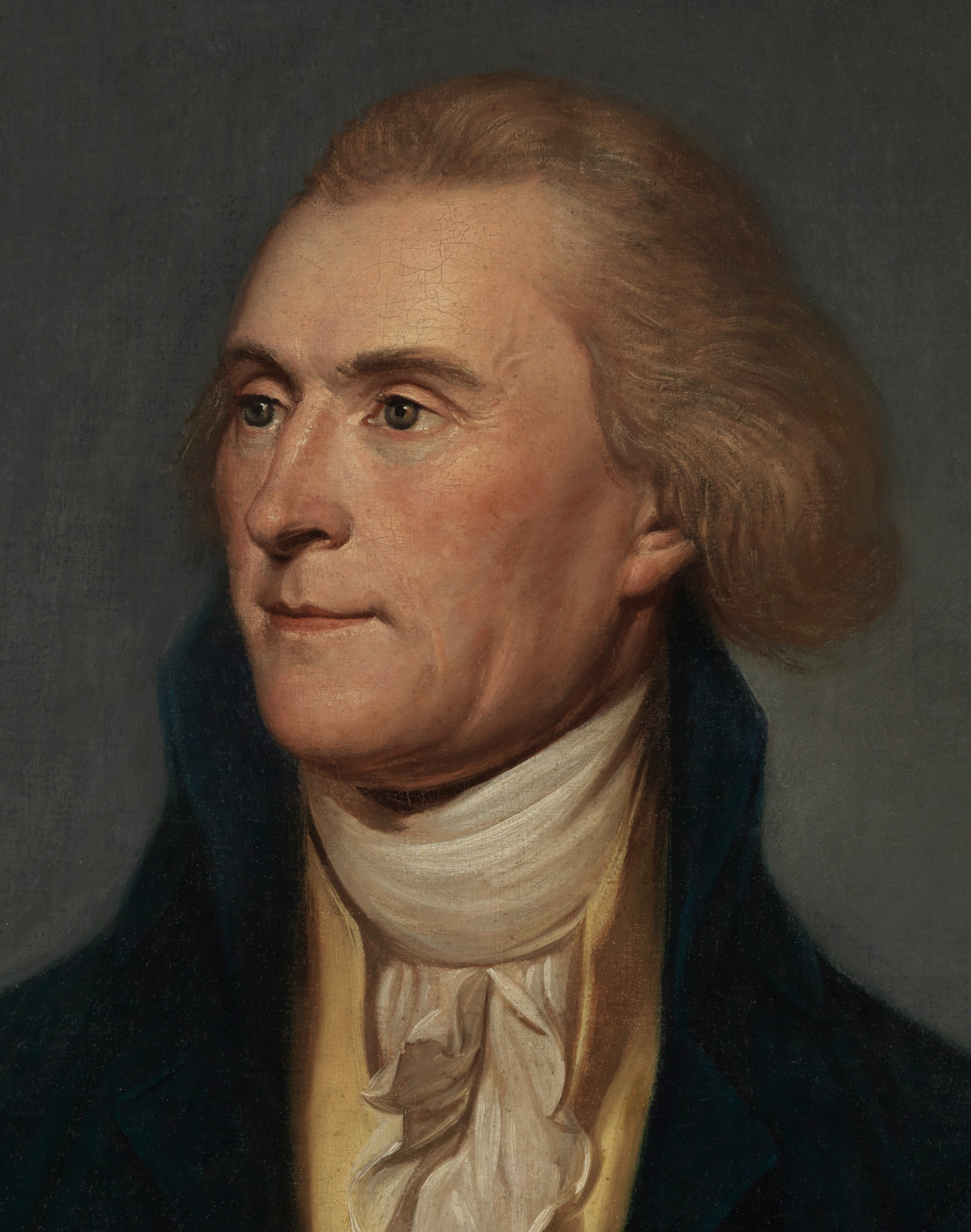
Nominee	John Adams	Thomas Jefferson
Party	Federalist	Democratic-Republican
Home state	Massachusetts	Virginia
Running mate	Thomas Pinckney	Aaron Burr
Electoral vote	3	0
Percentage	100.00%	0.00%

A presidential election was held in Delaware between November 4 and December 7, 1796, as part of the 1796 United States presidential election. Voters chose three representatives, or electors to the Electoral College, who voted for president and vice president.

Delaware cast three electoral votes for the Federalist candidate and incumbent vice president John Adams over the Democratic-Republican candidate Thomas Jefferson. These electors were elected by the Delaware General Assembly, the state legislature, rather than by popular vote. The three electoral votes for vice president were cast for Adams' running mate Thomas Pinckney from South Carolina.

== Results ==
1796 United States presidential election in Delaware
Party	Candidate	Votes	Percentage	Electoral votes
Federalist	John Adams	–	100.00%	3
Democratic-Republican	Thomas Jefferson	–	0.00%	0
Totals		–	–	3

== See also ==
- United States presidential elections in Delaware
