= 1796 United States presidential election in New Hampshire =

- November 4 – December 7, 1796
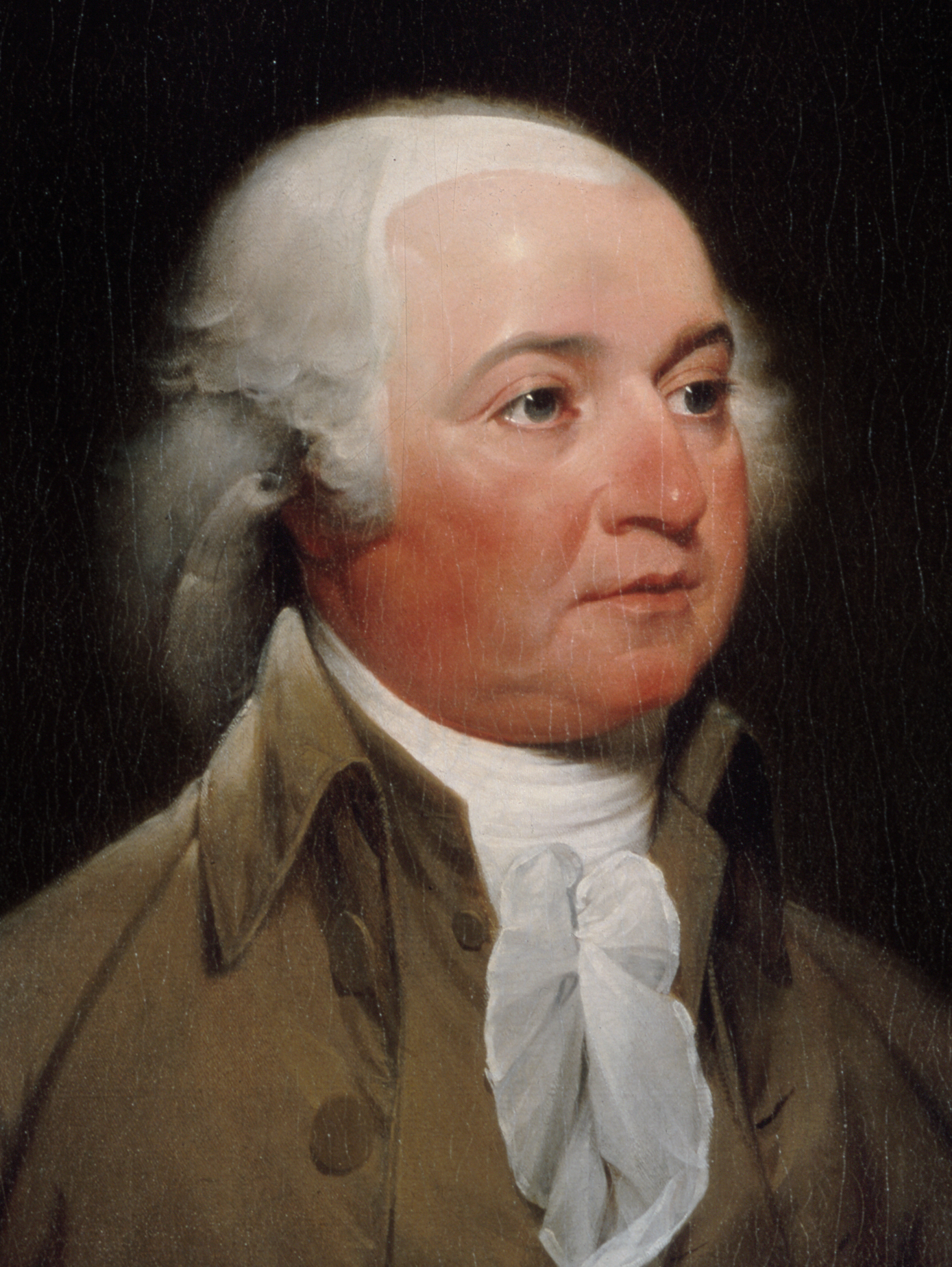
Nominee	John Adams
Party	Federalist
Home state	Massachusetts
Running mate	Thomas Pinckney
Electoral vote	6
Popular vote	3,719
Percentage	100.00%
County results
Adams
60-70%
70–80%
80–90%
90-100%
President before election
George Washington
Independent
Elected President
John Adams
Federalist

A presidential election was held in New Hampshire between November 4 to December 7, 1796, as part of the 1796 United States presidential election to elect the President. Voters chose five representatives, or electors to the Electoral College, who voted for President and Vice President.

New Hampshire voted for Federalist candidate and Vice President John Adams, over the Democratic-Republican candidate and Secretary of State Thomas Jefferson by a total of 78.6% margin of the popular vote, making this the largest margin for a presidential candidate in the state of New Hampshire.

== Results by presidential candidates ==
1796 United States presidential election in New Hampshire
Party	Candidate	Votes	%
Federalist	John Adams	3,719	100.00%
Total votes		3,719	100.00%

=== Results by county ===
1796 United States presidential election in New Hampshire
County	John Adams Federalist		Margin		Total (Note: Direct results for John Adams and Thomas Jefferson are taken from the highest voted elector with either a formal ticket pledge, or a submitted electoral vote, for each township where applicable.) (Note: Important. These partial county results are not indicative of the final result. Full township results are said to be lost or missing for this election.)
County	#	%	#	%	Total
Cheshire	208	100.00%	208	100.00%	208
Grafton	187	100.00%	187	100.00%	187
Hillsborough	125	100.00%	125	100.00%	125
Rockingham	282	100.00%	282	100.00%	282
Strafford	132	100.00%	132	100.00%	132
Total	934	100.00%	934	100.00%	934

=== Results by district ===
1796 United States presidential election in New Hampshire
District	E.V.	John Adams Federalist			Margin		Total (Note: Direct results for John Adams and Thomas Jefferson are taken from the highest voted elector with either a formal ticket pledge, or a submitted electoral vote, for each district.) (Note: Due to missing township results data, the highest performing elector of the at-large district is represented instead.)
District	E.V.	#	%	E.V.	#	%	Total
At-large	6	3,719	100.00%	6	3,719	100.00%	3,719
Total	6	3,719	100.00%	6	3,719	100.00%	3,719

== Results by presidential electors ==
1796 United States presidential election in New Hampshire
Party	Candidate	Votes	%
Federalist	Federalist electors	3,719	84.52%
Democratic-Republican	Democratic-Republican electors	681	15.48%
Total votes		4,400	100.00%

=== Results by county ===
1796 United States presidential election in New Hampshire
County	Federalist electors		Democratic-Republican electors		Margin		Total (Note: Results are taken from the highest voted Federalist, and Democratic-Republican elector for each township where applicable.)
County	#	%	#	%	#	%	Total
Cheshire	209	90.48%	22	9.52%	187	80.96%	231
Grafton	187	100.00%	0	0.00%	187	100.00%	187
Hillsborough	125	78.13%	35	21.87%	90	56.26%	160
Rockingham	282	67.63%	135	32.37%	147	35.26%	417
Strafford	132	89.19%	16	10.81%	116	78.38%	148
Total	935	81.80%	208	18.20%	727	63.60%	1,143

==== Results by county swing ====
Swing compared to the 1792 election
County	Party		Status
County	Federalist	Democratic-Republican	Status
County	± pp	± pp	Status
Cheshire	▼9.52 pp	▲9.52 pp	Loss
Grafton	▲53.85 pp	▼53.85 pp	Flip
Hillsborough	▲23.01 pp	▼23.01 pp	Gain
Rockingham	▲12.31 pp	▼12.31 pp	Gain
Strafford	▲44.84 pp	▼44.84 pp	Flip
Total	▲28.35 pp	▼28.35 pp	Gain

=== Results by district ===
1796 United States presidential election in New Hampshire
District	E.V.	Federalist electors			Democratic-Republican electors			Margin		Total (Note: Due to missing township results data, the highest performing federalist candidate and the highest performing democratic-republican candidate of the at-large district is represented instead.)
District	E.V.	#	%	E.V.	#	%	E.V.	#	%	Total
At-large	6	3,719	84.52%	6	681	15.48%	0	3,038	69.04%	4,400
Total	6	3,719	84.52%	6	681	15.48%	0	3,038	69.04%	4,400

=== Results by elector ===
1796 United States presidential election in New Hampshire
Party	Candidate	Votes	%
Federalist	Oliver Peabody (Note: Federalist elector for this election.)	3,719	16.61%
Federalist	John Taylor Gilman	3,408	15.22%
Federalist	Benjamin Bellows	3,176	14.18%
Federalist	Timothy Farrar	3,027	13.52%
Federalist	Ebenezer Thompson	2,867	12.80%
Federalist	Bezaleel Woodward	2,077	9.28%
Federalist	Timothy Walker (Note: Federalist elector for this election. Failed to reach a majority of votes and was subsequently selected to be an at-large presidential elector by the Massachusetts General Court.)	836	3.73%
Democratic-Republican	Joseph Badger (Note: Democratic-Republican elector for this election.)	681	3.04%
Federalist	Simeon Olcott	481	2.15%
Democratic-Republican	Robert Wallace	444	1.98%
Democratic-Republican	Thomas Bellows	443	1.98%
Democratic-Republican	Peter Wingate	310	1.38%
Democratic-Republican	John Goddard	139	0.62%
Democratic-Republican	Woodbury Langdon	132	0.59%
Unknown	Moses Leavitt	119	0.53%
Federalist	James Sheafe	74	0.33%
Federalist	John Prentice (Note: Federalist candidate for the New Hampshire House of Representatives in 1796.)	73	0.33%
Democratic-Republican	Thomas Cogswell (Note: Democratic-Republican candidate for the New Hampshire House of Representatives in 1796.)	68	0.30%
Democratic-Republican	Joseph Cilley (Note: Republican partisan during the 1790s who supported Thomas Jefferson in politics.)	65	0.29%
Federalist	Ammi Ruhamah Cutter (Note: Federalist partisan during the 1790s.)	61	0.27%
Unknown	John Calfe	26	0.12%
Democratic-Republican	Michael McClary	26	0.12%
Unknown	Israel Evans	24	0.11%
Unknown	Joseph Sheafe	22	0.10%
Unknown	Aaron Hutchinson	19	0.08%
Unknown	Ebenezer Smith (Note: Ebenezer Smith of Durham.)	16	0.07%
Unknown	Ebenezer Smith (Note: Ebenezer Smith of Meredith.)	13	0.06%
Democratic-Republican	Nathaniel Peabody (Note: Democratic-Republican candidate for the New Hampshire House of Representatives in 1796.)	13	0.06%
Unknown	Christopher Toppan	10	0.04%
Unknown	Joshua Brackett	6	0.03%
Unknown	Jonathan Warner	4	0.02%
Unknown	John Bellows	2	0.01%
Unknown	Joseph Pearson	2	0.01%
Unknown	Nathaniel Adams	2	0.01%
Unknown	Supply Clapp	2	0.01%
Unknown	Daniel Newcomb	1	0.00%
Unknown	Jeremiah Richardson	1	0.00%
Unknown	Moses Baker	1	0.00%
Federalist	Paine Wingate (Note: Federalist candidate for the New Hampshire State Senate in 1796.)	1	0.00%
Unknown	Samuel Drowne	1	0.00%
Unknown	Thomas Leavitt	1	0.00%
Unknown	Scattering	—	—
Total votes		22,393	100.00%

== See also ==
- United States presidential elections in New Hampshire
