= 1796 United States presidential election =

Election of John Adams

- November 4 – December 7, 1796

138 members of the Electoral College (Note: One Maryland elector pledged to Adams cast his two votes for Adams and Jefferson, bringing the total between them to 139 votes.) 70 electoral votes needed to win
- Turnout: 20.1% (▲13.8 pp)
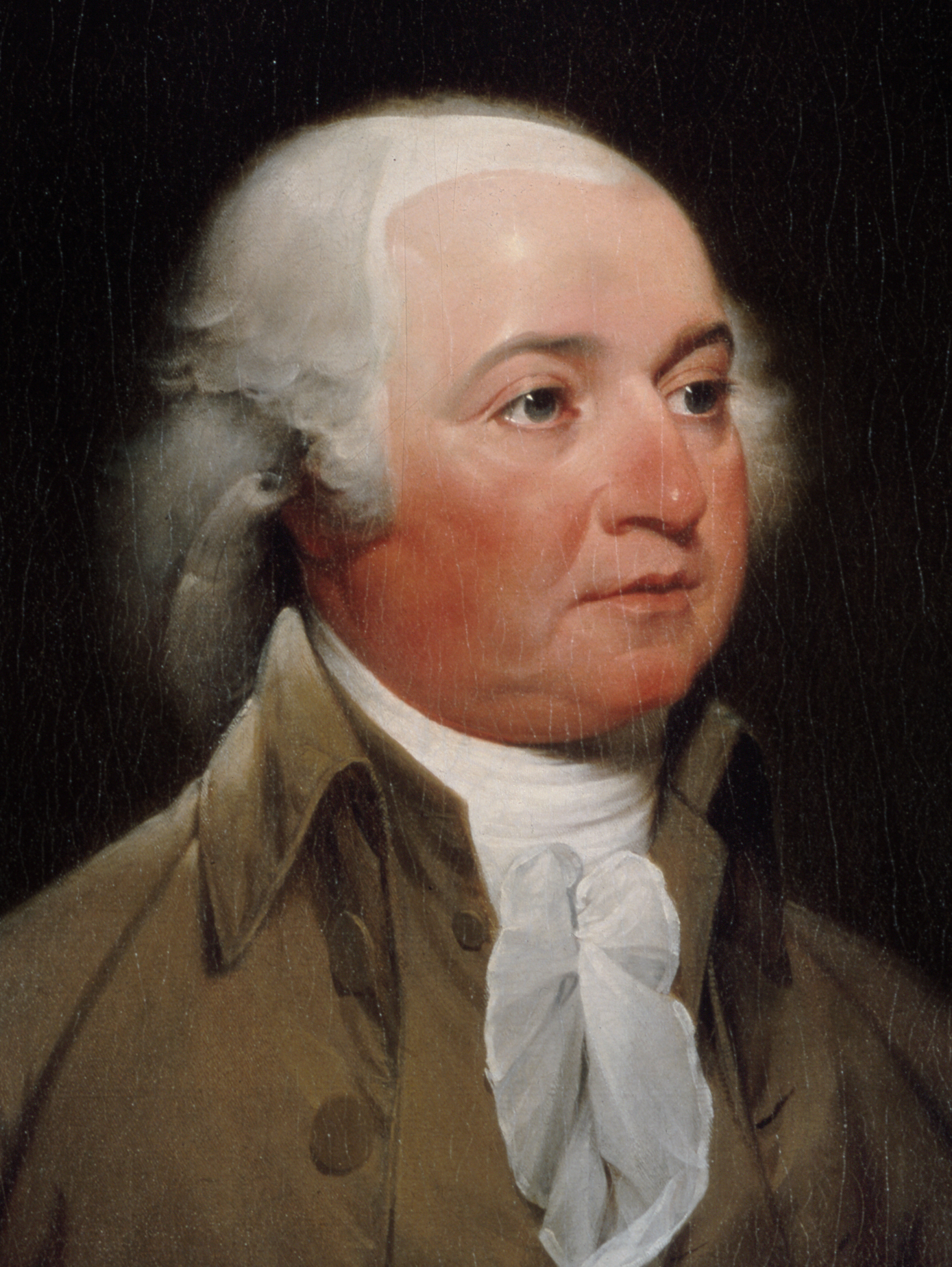

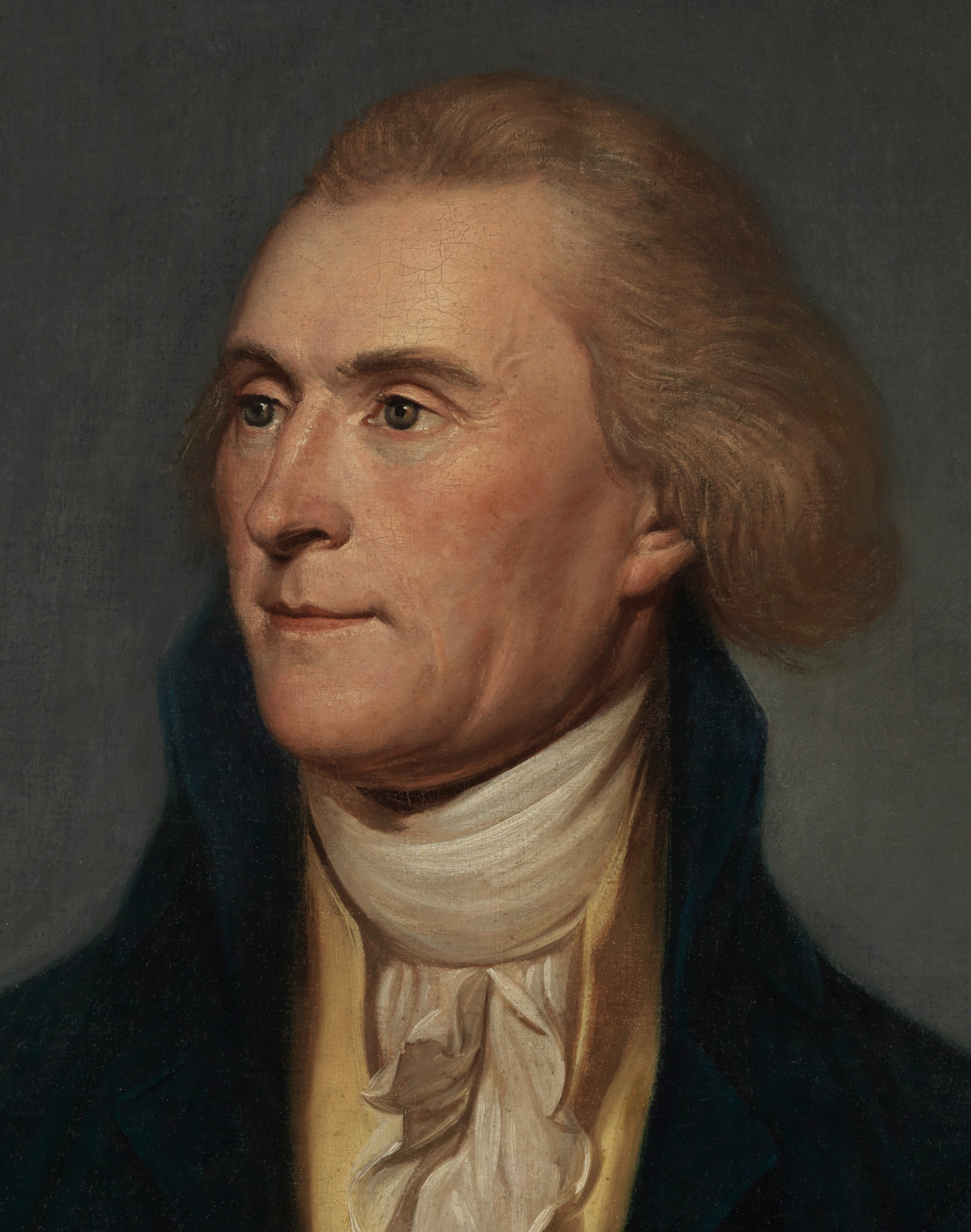
Nominee	John Adams	Thomas Jefferson (elected Vice President)
Party	Federalist	Democratic-Republican
Home state	Massachusetts	Virginia
Electoral vote	71	68
States carried	9	7
Popular vote	35,174	30,860
Percentage	53.3%	46.7%
- Presidential election results map. Green denotes states won by Jefferson, and salmon denotes states won by Adams. Numbers indicate the number of electoral votes cast by each state.
President before election
George Washington
Independent
Elected President
John Adams
Federalist

A presidential election was held in the United States from November 4 to December 7, 1796, when electors throughout the United States cast their ballots. It was the first contested American presidential election, the first presidential election in which political parties played a dominant role, and the only presidential election in which a president and vice president were elected from opposing tickets. Incumbent vice president John Adams of the Federalist Party defeated former secretary of state Thomas Jefferson of the Democratic-Republican Party.

With incumbent president George Washington having refused a third term in office, the 1796 election became the first U.S. presidential election in which political parties competed for the presidency. The Federalists coalesced behind Adams and the Democratic-Republicans supported Jefferson, but each party ran multiple candidates. Under the electoral rules in place prior to the Twelfth Amendment, the members of the Electoral College each cast two votes, with no distinction made between electoral votes for president and electoral votes for vice president. The individual with the votes of a majority of electors became president, and the runner-up became vice president. If there was a tie for first place or no person won a majority, the House of Representatives would hold a contingent election. Also, if there were a tie for second place, the vice presidency, the Senate would hold a contingent election to break the tie.

The campaign was a bitter one, with Federalists attempting to identify the Democratic-Republicans with the violence of the French Revolution and the Democratic-Republicans accusing the Federalists of favoring monarchism and aristocracy. Republicans sought to associate Adams with the policies developed by fellow Federalist Alexander Hamilton during the Washington administration, which they declaimed were too much in favor of Great Britain and a centralized national government. In foreign policy, Republicans denounced the Federalists over the Jay Treaty, which had established a temporary peace with Great Britain. Federalists attacked Jefferson's moral character, alleging he was an atheist and that he had been a coward during the American Revolutionary War. Adams's supporters also accused Jefferson of being too pro-France; the accusation was underscored when the French ambassador embarrassed the Republicans by publicly backing Jefferson and attacking the Federalists right before the election. Despite the hostility between their respective camps, neither Adams nor Jefferson actively campaigned for the presidency.

Adams was elected president with 71 electoral votes, one more than was needed for a majority. He won by sweeping the electoral votes of New England and winning votes from several other swing states, especially the states of the Mid-Atlantic region. Jefferson received 68 electoral votes and was elected vice president. Former governor Thomas Pinckney of South Carolina, a Federalist, finished with 59 electoral votes, while Senator Aaron Burr, a Democratic-Republican from New York, won 30 electoral votes. The remaining 48 electoral votes were dispersed among nine other candidates. Several electors cast one vote for a Federalist candidate and one for a Democratic-Republican. The election marked the formation of the First Party System, and established a rivalry between Federalist New England and the Democratic-Republican South, with the middle states holding the balance of power (New York and Maryland were the crucial swing states, and between them only voted for a loser once between 1789 and 1820).

== Candidates ==
George Washington, the incumbent president in 1796, whose second term expired on March 4, 1797

With Washington retiring after two terms, both parties sought the presidency for the first time. Before the ratification of the 12th Amendment in 1804, each elector was to vote for two persons but was not able to indicate which vote was for president and which for vice president. Instead, the recipient of the most electoral votes would become president and the runner-up vice president. As a result, both parties ran multiple candidates for president, in hopes of keeping one of their opponents from being the runner-up. These candidates were the equivalent of modern-day running mates, but under the law, they were all candidates for president. Thus, both Adams and Jefferson were technically opposed by several members of their own parties. The plan was for one of the electors to cast a vote for the main party nominee (Adams or Jefferson) and a candidate besides the primary running mate, thus ensuring that the main nominee would have one more vote than his running mate.

=== Federalist candidates ===
The Federalists' nominee was John Adams of Massachusetts, the incumbent vice president and a leading voice during the Revolutionary period. Most Federalist leaders viewed Adams, who had twice been elected vice president, as Washington's natural heir. Adams's main running mate was Thomas Pinckney, a former governor of South Carolina who had negotiated the Treaty of San Lorenzo with Spain. Pinckney agreed to run after the first choice of many party leaders, former governor Patrick Henry of Virginia, declined. Alexander Hamilton, who competed with Adams for leadership of the party, worked behind the scenes to elect Pinckney over Adams by convincing Jefferson electors from South Carolina to cast their second votes for Pinckney. Hamilton did prefer Adams to Jefferson, and urged Federalist electors to cast their votes for Adams and Pinckney.

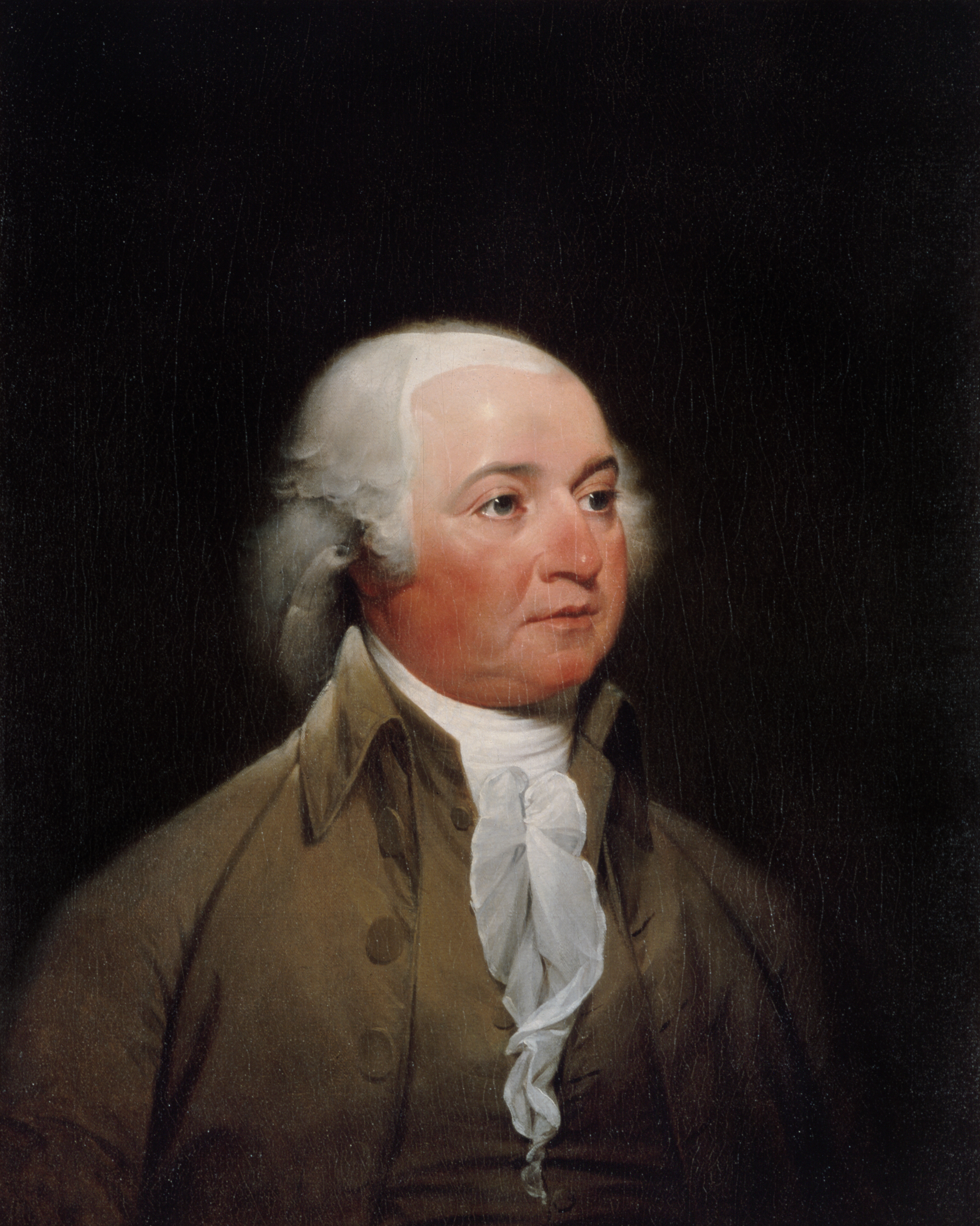
John Adams,
vice president of the United States from Massachusetts

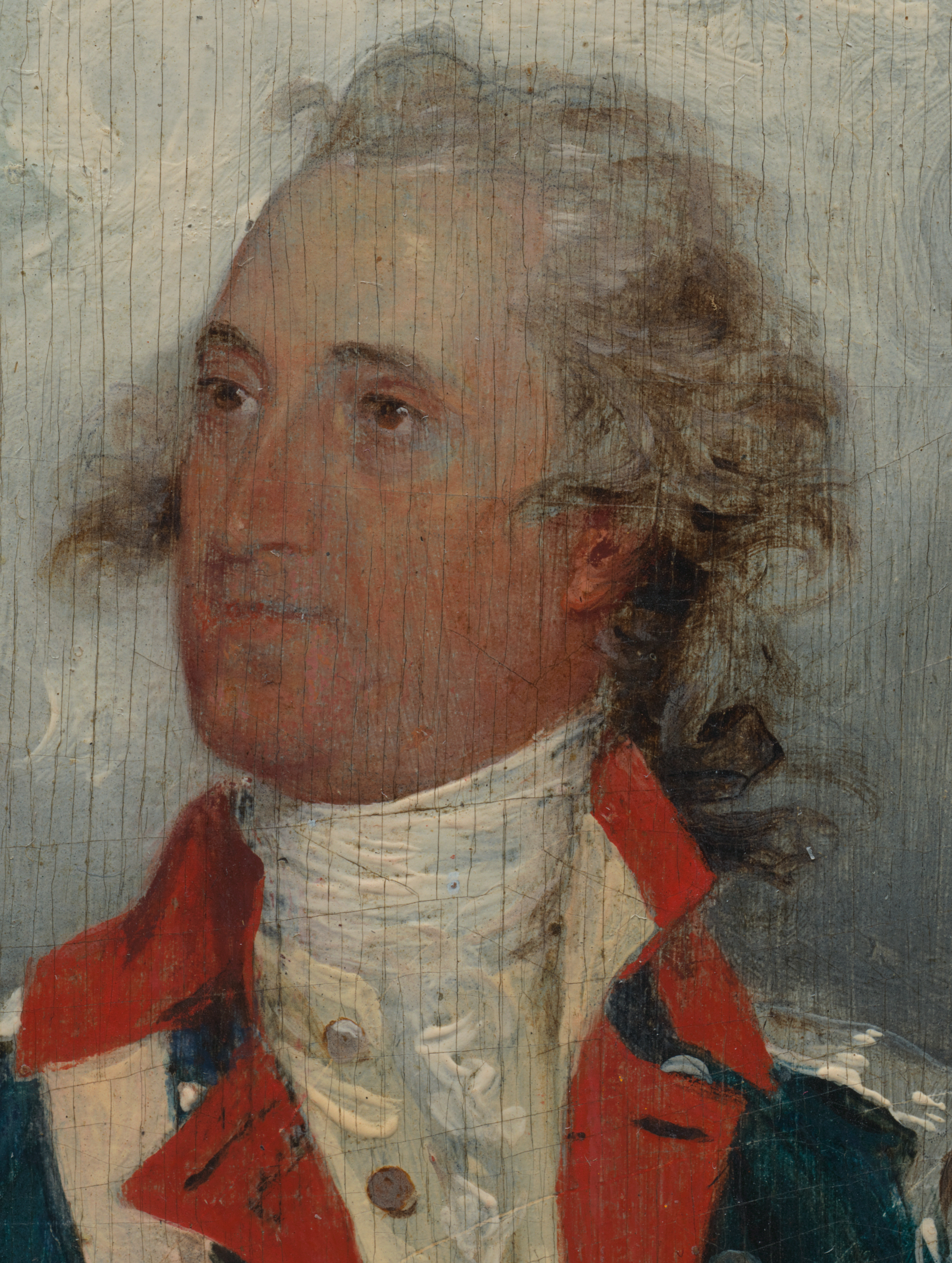
Thomas Pinckney, U.S. minister to Great Britain
from South Carolina

Oliver Ellsworth,
U.S. chief justice
from Connecticut

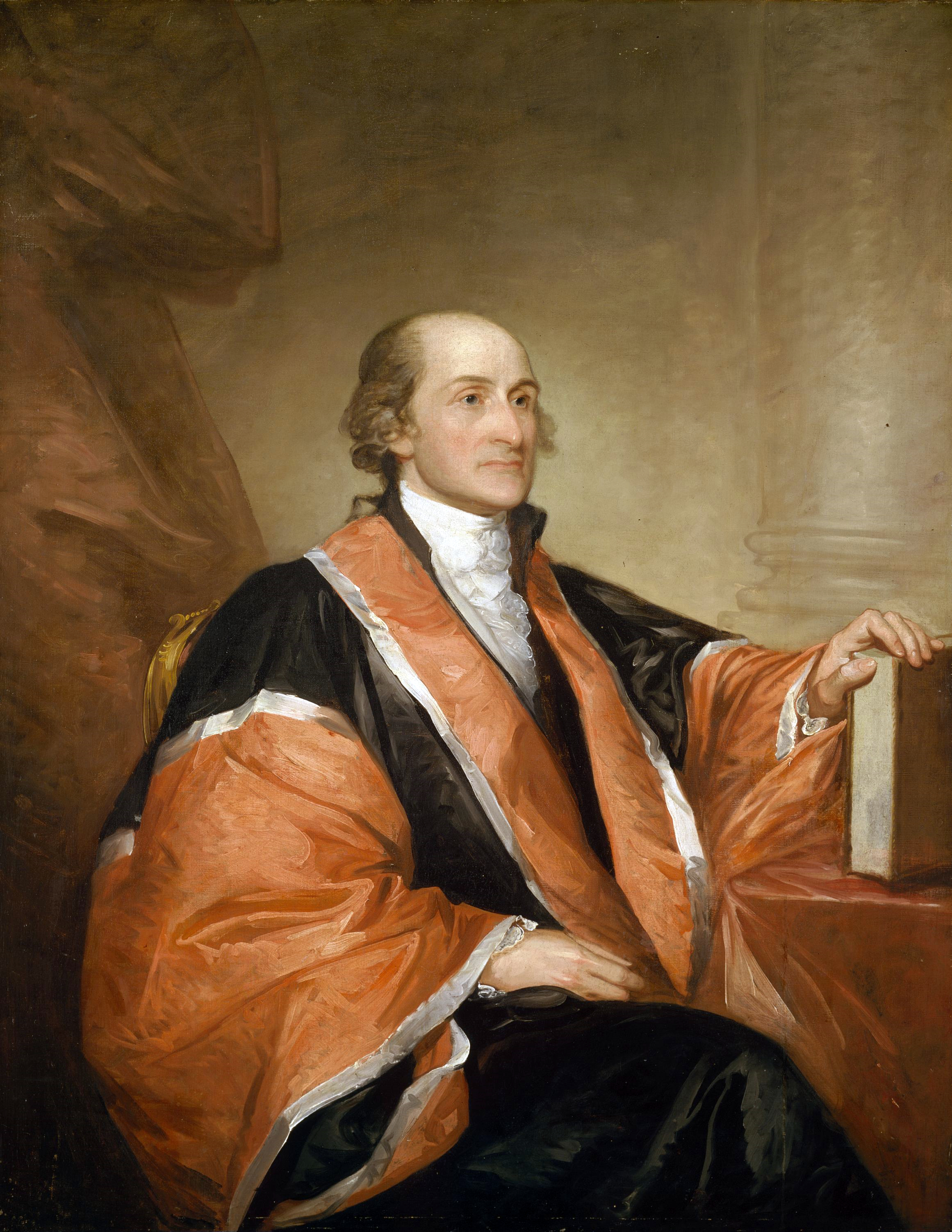
John Jay,
governor of New York

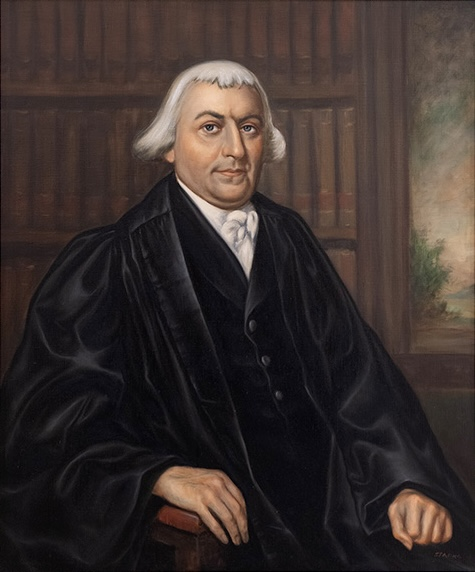
James Iredell,
associate justice of the U.S. Supreme Court
from North Carolina

Samuel Johnston,
former U.S. senator from North Carolina

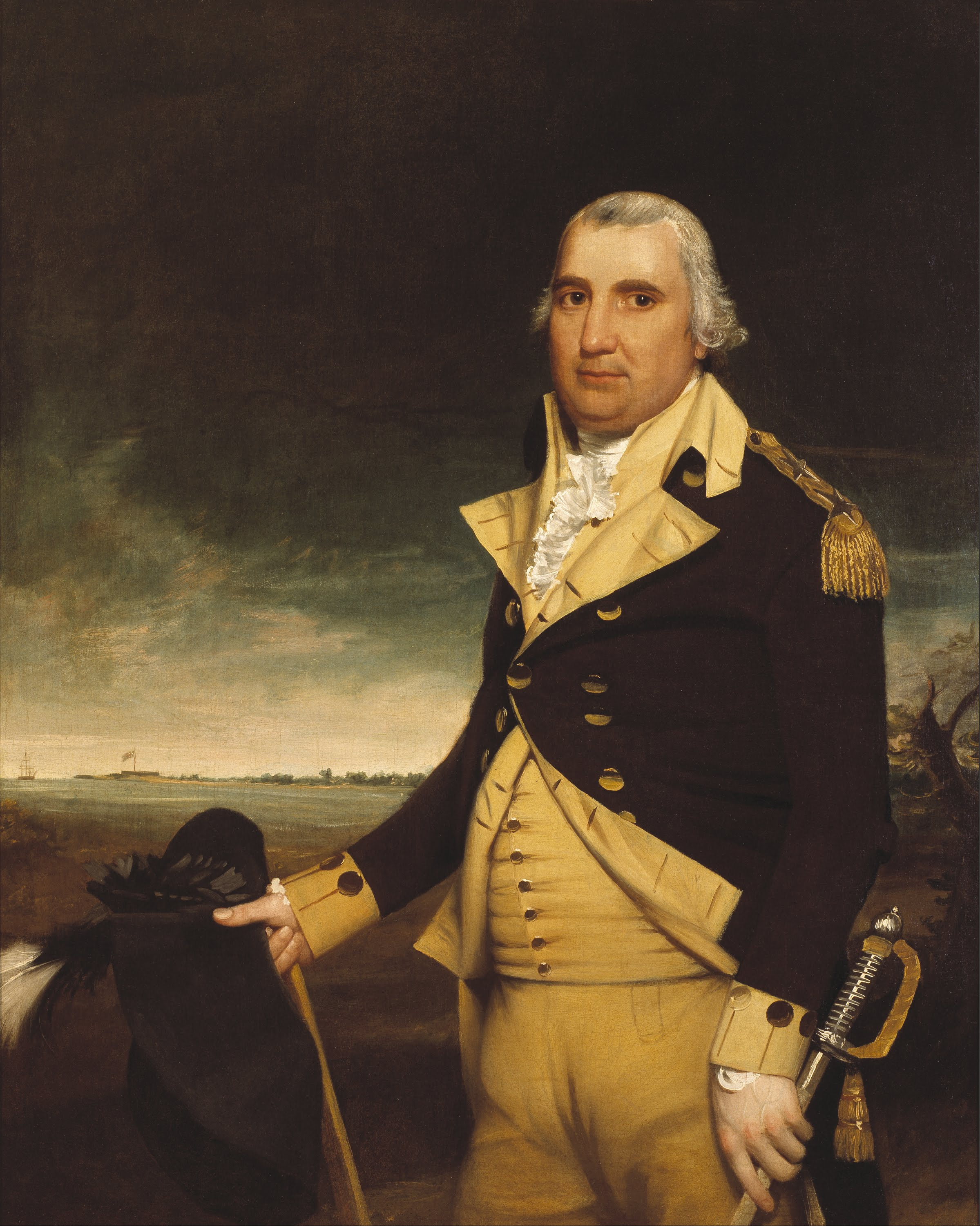
Charles Cotesworth Pinckney,
U.S. minister to France
from South Carolina

=== Democratic-Republican candidates ===
The Democratic-Republicans united behind former secretary of state Thomas Jefferson, who had co-founded the party with James Madison and others in opposition to Hamilton's policies. Congressional Democratic-Republicans sought to also unite behind one vice-presidential nominee. With Jefferson's popularity strongest in the South, many party leaders wanted a Northern candidate as Jefferson's running mate. Popular choices included Senator Pierce Butler of South Carolina and three New Yorkers: Senator Aaron Burr, Chancellor Robert R. Livingston, and former governor George Clinton. A group of Democratic-Republican leaders met in June 1796 and agreed to support Jefferson for president and Burr for vice president.

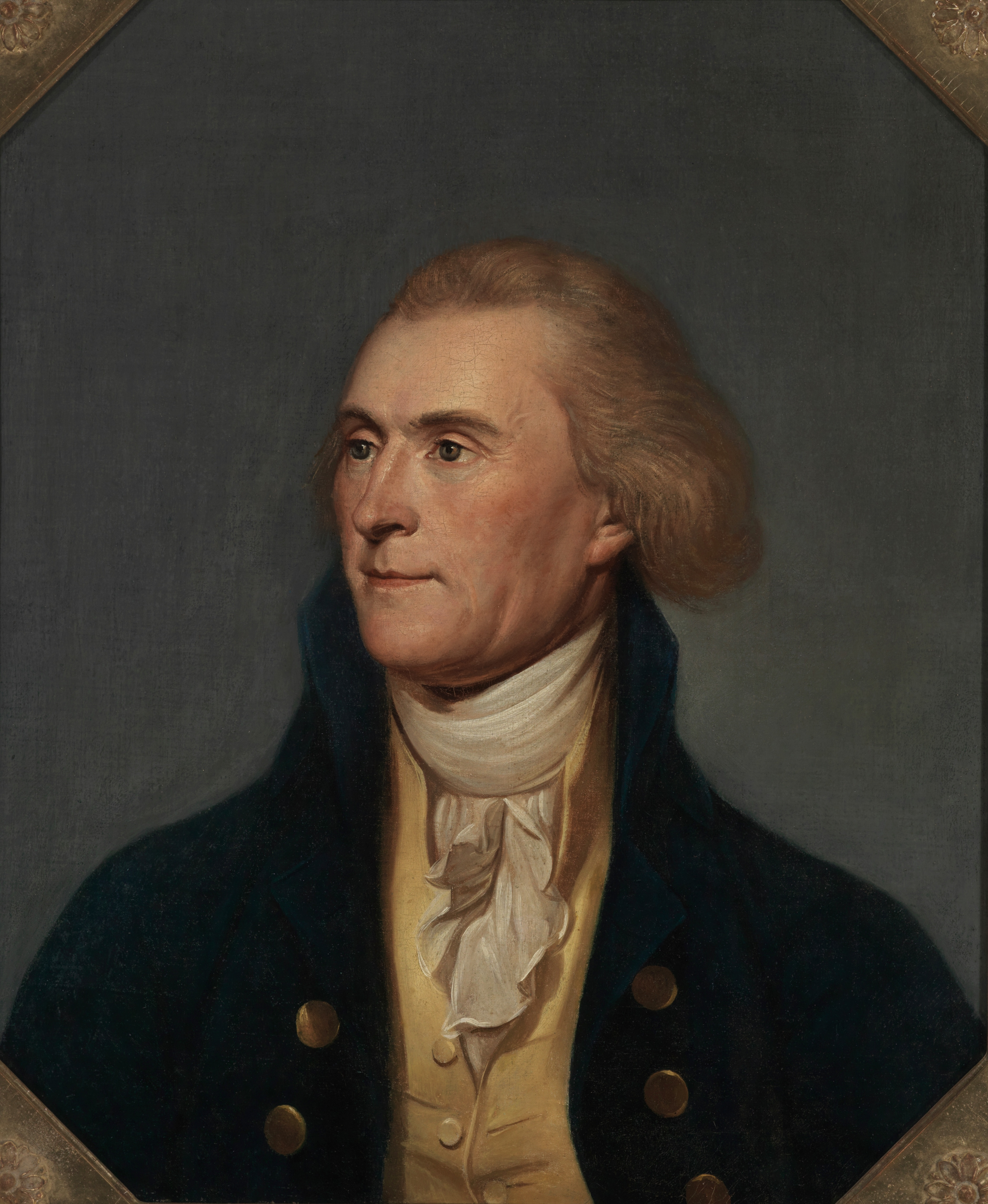
Thomas Jefferson,
former secretary of state

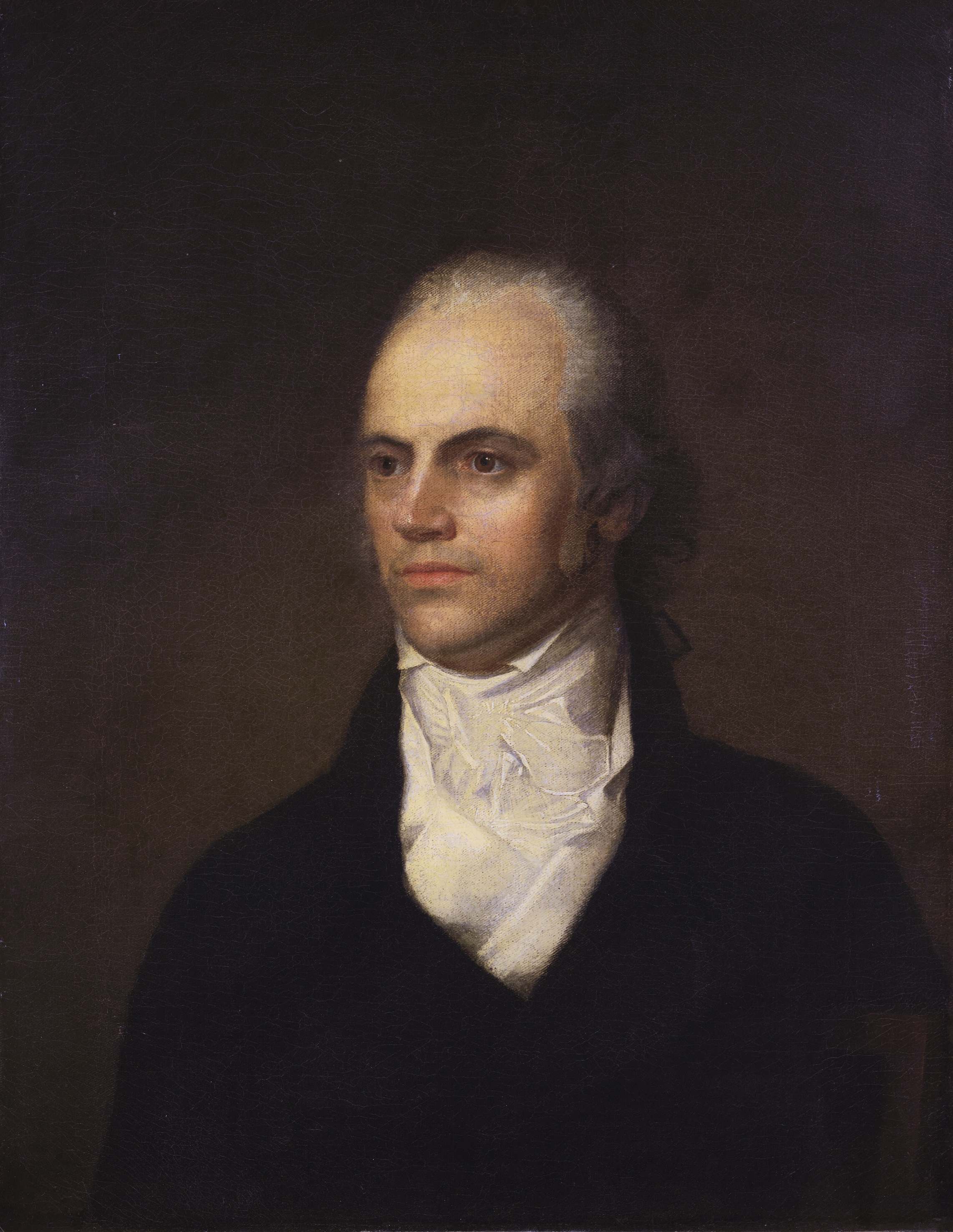
Aaron Burr,
U.S. senator from New York

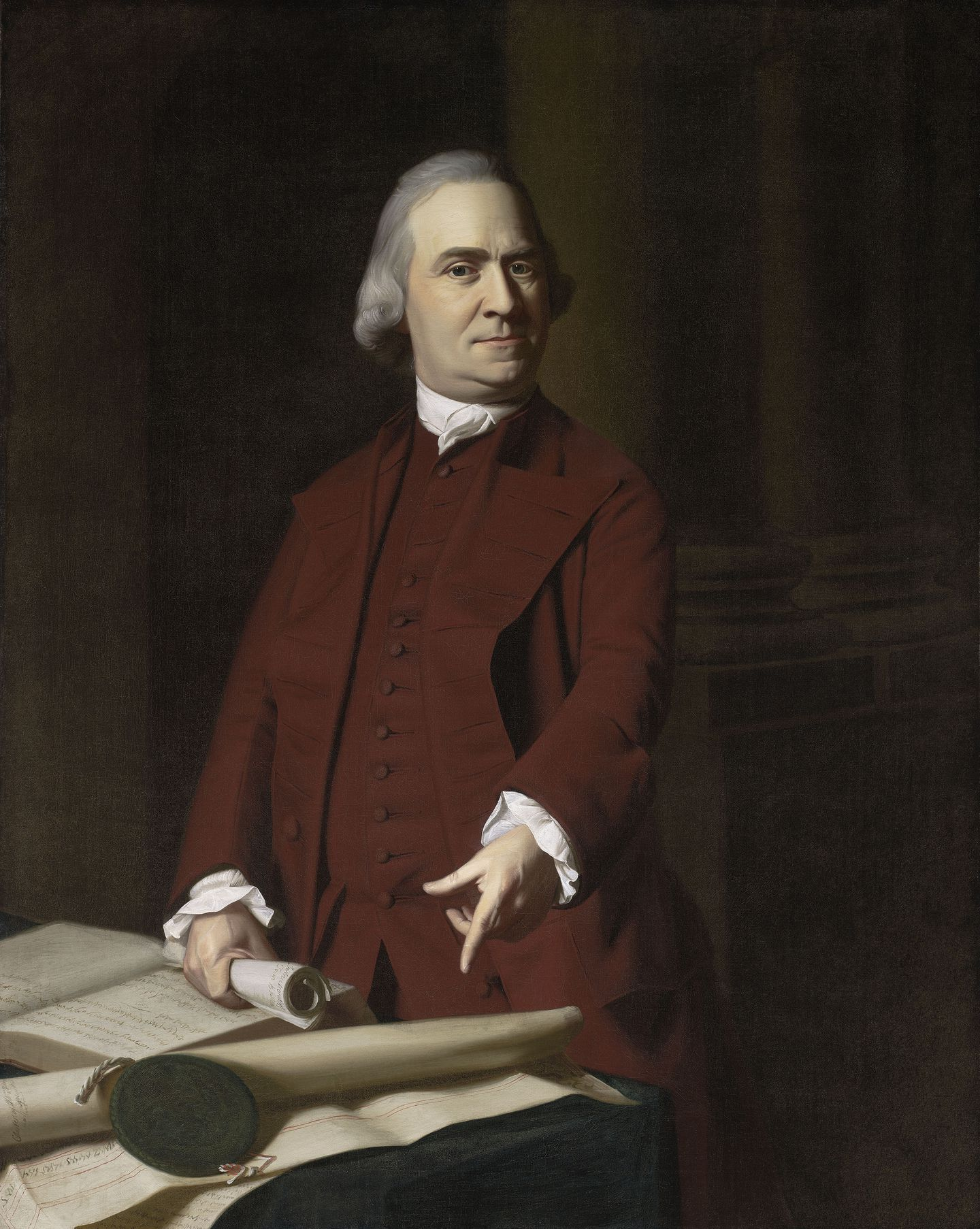
Samuel Adams,
governor of Massachusetts

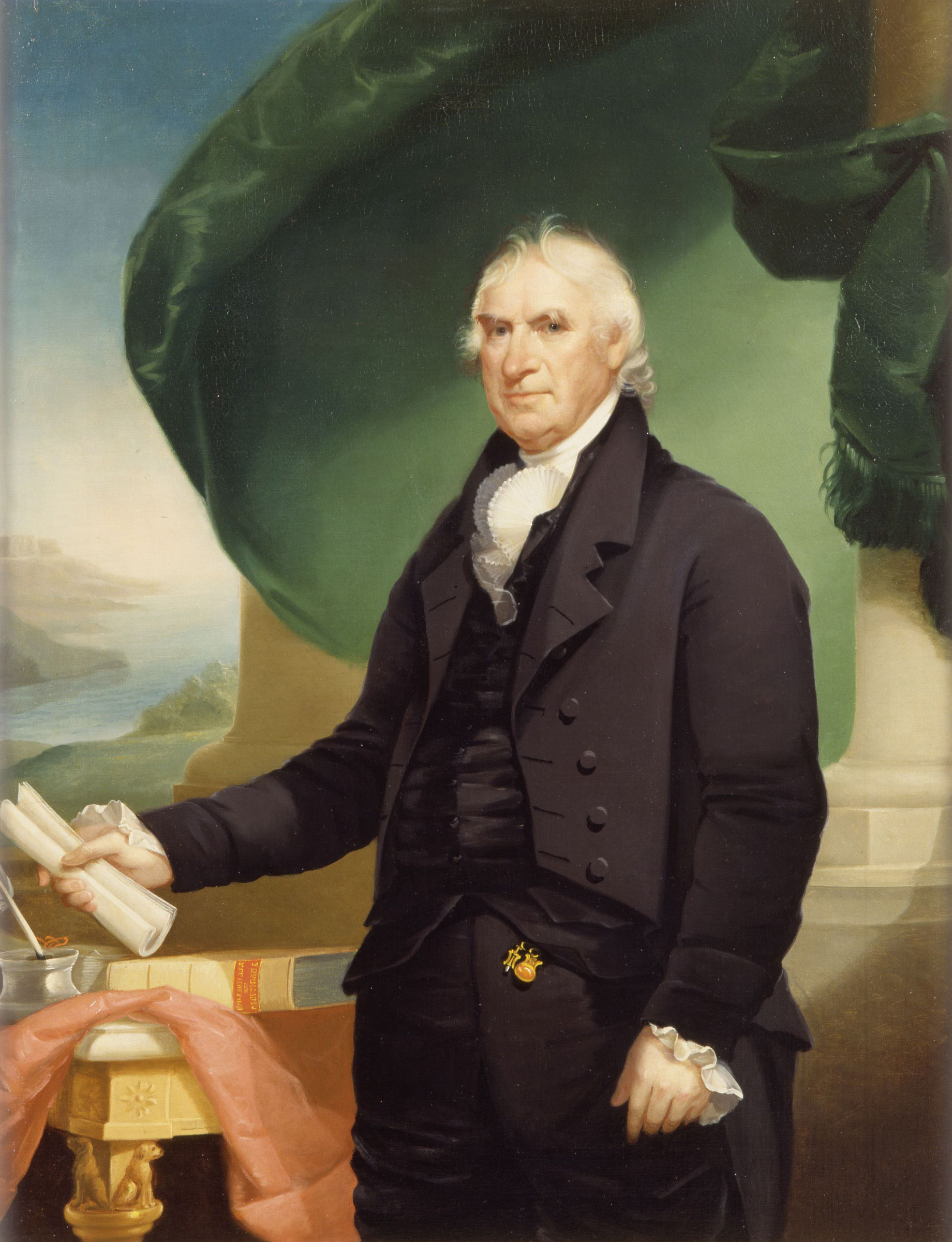
George Clinton,
former governor of New York

== Results ==
Electoral College result (first vote)

Electoral College result (second vote)

Objections made to the electoral college votes of the 1796 U.S. presidential election
No objections

Tennessee was admitted into the United States after the 1792 election, increasing the Electoral College to 138 electors.

Under the system in place before the 1804 ratification of the Twelfth Amendment, electors were to cast votes for two persons for president; the runner-up in the presidential race was elected vice president. If no candidate won votes from a majority of the Electoral College, the House of Representatives would hold a contingent election to select the winner. Each party intended to manipulate the results by having some of their electors cast one vote for the intended presidential candidate and one vote for someone besides the intended vice-presidential candidate, leaving their vice-presidential candidate a few votes shy of their presidential candidate. But all electoral votes were cast on the same day, and communications between states were extremely slow at that time, making it very difficult to coordinate which electors were to manipulate their vote for vice president. Additionally, there were rumors that Hamilton had coerced southern electors pledged to Jefferson to give their second vote to Pinckney in hope of electing him president instead of Adams.

Campaigning centered in the swing states of New York and Pennsylvania. Adams and Jefferson won a combined 139 electoral votes from the 138 members of the Electoral College. The Federalists swept every state north of the Mason–Dixon line except Pennsylvania, though one Pennsylvania elector voted for Adams. The Democratic-Republicans won the votes of most Southern electors, but the electors of Maryland and Delaware gave a majority of their votes to Federalist candidates, while North Carolina and Virginia each gave Adams one electoral vote.

Nationwide, most electors voted for Adams and a second Federalist or for Jefferson and a second Democratic-Republican, but there were several exceptions to this. One elector in Maryland voted for both Adams and Jefferson, and two electors cast votes for Washington, who had not campaigned and was not formally affiliated with either party. Pinckney won the second votes from most of the electors who voted for Adams, but 21 electors from New England and Maryland cast their second votes for other candidates, including Chief Justice Oliver Ellsworth. Those who voted for Jefferson were significantly less united in their second choice, though Burr won a plurality of the Jefferson electors. All eight electors in Pinckney's home state of South Carolina, as well as at least one Pennsylvania elector, cast their ballots for Jefferson and Pinckney. In North Carolina, Jefferson won 11 votes, but the remaining 13 were spread among six different candidates from both parties. In Virginia, most electors voted for Jefferson and Governor Samuel Adams of Massachusetts.

Congress counted the electoral results on February 8, 1797, with John Adams opening and reading the votes in his role as President of the Senate. Although some contemporary newspapers contested the legal validity of Vermont's electoral votes, no objections against them were raised in congress. The result was that Adams received 71 electoral votes, one more than required to be elected president. If any two of the three Adams electors in Pennsylvania, Virginia, and North Carolina had voted with the rest of their states, it would have flipped the election. Jefferson received 68 votes, nine more than Pinckney, and was elected vice president. Burr finished in a distant fourth place with 30 votes. Nine other candidates received the remaining 48 electoral votes. If Pinckney had won the second votes of all of the New England electors who voted for Adams, he would have been elected president over Adams and Jefferson.

Presidential candidate	Party	Home state	Popular vote^{(a), (b), (c)}		Electoral vote
Presidential candidate	Party	Home state	Count	Percentage	Electoral vote
John Adams	Federalist	Massachusetts	35,174	53.3%	71
Thomas Jefferson	Democratic-Republican	Virginia	30,860	46.7%	68
Thomas Pinckney	Federalist	South Carolina	—	—	59
Aaron Burr	Democratic-Republican	New York	—	—	30
Samuel Adams	Democratic-Republican	Massachusetts	—	—	15
Oliver Ellsworth	Federalist	Connecticut	—	—	11
George Clinton	Democratic-Republican	New York	—	—	7
John Jay	Federalist	New York	—	—	5
James Iredell	Federalist	North Carolina	—	—	3
George Washington	Independent	Virginia	—	—	2
John Henry	Federalist	Maryland	—	—	2
Samuel Johnston	Federalist	North Carolina	—	—	2
Charles Cotesworth Pinckney	Federalist	South Carolina	—	—	1
Total			66,034	100.0%	138
Needed to win					70

Source (Popular Vote): Dubin, Michael J. (2002). United States Presidential Elections, 1788-1860: The Official Results by County and State. Jefferson: McFarland & Company. pp. 6–8. ISBN 9780786410170.
Source (Popular Vote): A New Nation Votes: American Election Returns 1787-1825
Source (Electoral Vote): "Electoral College Box Scores 1789–1996". National Archives and Records Administration.

^{(a)} Votes for Federalist electors have been assigned to John Adams and votes for Democratic-Republican electors have been assigned to Thomas Jefferson.
^{(b)} Only 9 of the 16 states used any form of popular vote.
^{(c)} Those states that did choose electors by popular vote had widely varying restrictions on suffrage via property requirements.

Popular vote
J. Adams	53.4%
Jefferson	46.6%

Electoral vote (Note: Electors voted for two candidates; percentages are calculated as a share of the total number of electors.)
J. Adams	51.4%
Jefferson	49.3%
T. Pinckney	42.8%
Burr	21.7%
S. Adams	11.0%
Ellsworth	8.0%
Clinton	5.1%
Jay	3.6%
Iredell	2.2%
Washington	1.4%
Henry	1.4%
Johnston	1.4%
C. Pinckney	0.7%

=== Electoral votes by state ===
As per the terms of the unamended constitution, each elector was permitted two votes for president, with a majority of "the whole number of electors appointed" necessary to elect a president. Of the 138 participating electors, 70 voted for Adams and some other candidate and 67 voted for Jefferson and some other candidate; one elector from Maryland voted for both Adams and Jefferson, bringing their respective totals to 71 and 68. With both parties' electors divided on their choice of a vice president, Jefferson finished second in the electoral vote ahead of Adams' intended running mate, Thomas Pinckney of South Carolina, making him vice president-elect.

State	Electors	Electoral votes	JA	TJ	TP	AB	SA	OE	GC	JJ	JI	JH	SJ	GW	CP
Connecticut (Note: Electors chosen by the state legislature)	9	18	9	—	4	—	—	—	—	5	—	—	—	—	—
Delaware	3	6	3	—	3	—	—	—	—	—	—	—	—	—	—
Georgia	4	8	—	4	—	—	—	—	4	—	—	—	—	—	—
Kentucky	4	8	—	4	—	4	—	—	—	—	—	—	—	—	—
Maryland	10	20	7	4	4	3	—	—	—	—	—	2	—	—	—
Massachusetts	16	32	16	—	13	—	—	1	—	—	—	—	2	—	—
New Hampshire	6	12	6	—	—	—	—	6	—	—	—	—	—	—	—
New Jersey	7	14	7	—	7	—	—	—	—	—	—	—	—	—	—
New York	12	24	12	—	12	—	—	—	—	—	—	—	—	—	—
North Carolina	12	24	1	11	1	6	—	—	—	—	3	—	—	1	1
Pennsylvania	15	30	1	14	2	13	—	—	—	—	—	—	—	—	—
Rhode Island	4	8	4	—	—	—	—	4	—	—	—	—	—	—	—
South Carolina	8	16	—	8	8	—	—	—	—	—	—	—	—	—	—
Tennessee	3	6	—	3	—	3	—	—	—	—	—	—	—	—	—
Vermont	4	8	4	—	4	—	—	—	—	—	—	—	—	—	—
Virginia	21	42	1	20	1	1	15	—	3	—	—	—	—	1	—
TOTAL	138	276	71	68	59	30	15	11	7	5	3	2	2	2	1
TO WIN	70	70													

Source: A New Nation Votes: American Election Returns 1787-1825

=== Popular vote by state ===
Compiling reliable popular vote statistics for elections of the First Party System poses a challenge to historians. Election procedures of the late 18th century differed greatly from those of later campaigns: rather than vote for a presidential candidate, voters chose from candidates running to represent their state in the electoral college. Candidates for elector did not always advertise a party preference or even for whom they intended to vote; in some districts, candidates from the same party were in direct competition, while in others, inconsistent support for all candidates of a party led states to split their electoral votes. These conditions make it difficult or impossible to determine voter intent in some cases. Moreover, some states' returns have not survived to the present day, meaning that national popular vote totals in this article are necessarily incomplete.

The table below calculates each state's popular vote by comparing the vote for the most popular Adams elector to that for the most popular Jefferson elector.

In Massachusetts, the best performing elector candidates for the First Western and Second Middle Districts, Simon Larned and James Winthrop respectively, were not selected by the Massachusetts General Court to be electors. Larned was a Democratic-Republican and Winthrop was a former Anti-Federalist.

The totals for Massachusetts and Virginia appear to be incomplete. In several states candidates of unknown affiliation received votes.

		John Adams Federalist			Thomas Jefferson Democratic-Republican			Margin		State total
State	Electoral votes	#	%	Electoral votes	#	%	Electoral votes	#	%	#
Connecticut	9	no popular vote		9	no popular vote		—	—		—
Delaware	3	no popular vote		3	no popular vote		—	—		—
Georgia	4	2,644	29.9	—	6,200	70.1	4	-3556	-40.2	8,844
Kentucky	4	no data		—	no data		4	—		—
Maryland	10 (Note: Ten electors were chosen from Maryland in 1796, with two votes apiece. Six voted for John Adams and some other Federalist; three voted for Thomas Jefferson and Aaron Burr; the final elector voted for Adams and Jefferson, both. This brings the sum of Adams' and Jefferson's electoral votes from Maryland to eleven, one greater than the number of electors chosen from that state.)	7,029	52.0	7	6,490	48.0	4	539	4.0	13,519
Massachusetts	16	7,848	82.4	16	1,671	17.6	—	6,177	64.8	9,519
New Hampshire	6	3,719	84.5	6	681	15.5	—	3,038	69.0	4,400
New Jersey	7	no popular vote		7	no popular vote		—	—		—
New York	12	no popular vote		12	no popular vote		—	—		—
North Carolina	12	no data		1	no data		11	—		—
Pennsylvania	15	12,217	49.8	1	12,306	50.2	14	-89	-0.4	24,523
Rhode Island	4	no popular vote		4	no popular vote		—	—		—
South Carolina	8	no popular vote		—	no popular vote		8	—		—
Tennessee	3	no popular vote		—	no popular vote		3	—		—
Vermont	4	no popular vote		4	no popular vote		—	—		—
Virginia	21	1,717	32.8	1	3,512	67.2	20	-1,795	-34.4	5,229
TOTALS	138	35,174	53.3	71	30,860	46.7	68	4,314	6.6	66,034
TO WIN	70									

Sources: A New Nation Votes; Dubin, p. 6-8.

=== Maps ===
Map of presidential election results by county, shaded according to the vote share of the highest result for an elector of any given party

Map of presidential election results by electoral district, shaded according to the vote share of the highest result for an elector of any given party. Electoral boundaries and data for Kentucky, Massachusetts, and North Carolina could not be found.

=== Close states ===
States where the margin of victory was under 1% (15 electoral votes):

1. Pennsylvania, 0.4% (89 votes)

States where the margin of victory was under 5% (11 electoral votes):

1. Maryland, 4.0% (539 votes)

== Consequences ==
The following four years were the only time that the president and vice president were from different parties. John Quincy Adams and John C. Calhoun were later elected president and vice-president as political opponents, but they were both Democratic-Republicans, and while Andrew Johnson, Abraham Lincoln's second vice-president, was a Democrat, Lincoln ran on a combined National Union Party ticket in 1864, not as a strict Republican.

On January 6, 1797, Representative William L. Smith of South Carolina presented a resolution on the floor of the House of Representatives for an amendment to the Constitution by which the presidential electors would designate which candidate would be president and which vice president. No action was taken on his proposal, setting the stage for the deadlocked election of 1800.

This is also the first of only two elections so far in the history of the Republic which elected a presidential term of only 1,460 days rather than 1,461 days (the second was in 1896). This is because of the Gregorian calendar rule that years ending in "00" but not divisible by 400, are not leap years.

== Foreign influence ==
The French foreign minister, Charles Delacroix, wrote that France "must raise up the [American] people and at the same time conceal the lever by which we do so... I propose... to send orders and instructions to our minister plenipotentiary at Philadelphia to use all means in his power to bring about a successful revolution, and [George] Washington's replacement." The French minister (ambassador) to the United States, Pierre Adet, openly supported the Democratic-Republican Party and its presidential nominee, Thomas Jefferson, while attacking the Federalist Party and its presidential nominee, John Adams.

The foreign intrigue France perpetrated was unsuccessful, as Adams won the election with an electoral vote count of 71–68. A significant factor in thwarting the French efforts was George Washington's Farewell Address, which condemned foreign meddling in America.

== Electoral college selection ==
The Constitution, in Article II, Section 1, provided that the state legislatures should decide the manner in which their Electors were chosen. Different state legislatures chose different methods:

Method of choosing electors	State(s)
Each elector appointed by the state legislature	Connecticut; Delaware; New Jersey; New York; Rhode Island; South Carolina; Vermont
State is divided into electoral districts, with one elector chosen per district by the voters of that district	Kentucky; Maryland; North Carolina; Virginia
Each elector chosen by voters statewide	Georgia; Pennsylvania
Two electors appointed by the state legislature; Each remaining elector chosen by the state legislature from list of top two vote-getters in each congressional district	Massachusetts
Each elector chosen by voters statewide; however, if no candidate wins majority, the state legislature appoints elector from top two candidates	New Hampshire
Divided the state into three electoral districts and named three persons from each county in each district to elect an elector for each of the three districts	Tennessee

== See also ==
- Inauguration of John Adams
- Bibliography of Thomas Jefferson
- History of the United States (1789–1849)
- First Party System
- 1796–97 United States House of Representatives elections
- 1796–97 United States Senate elections

== Primary sources ==
- Cunningham, Noble E., Jr. ed. The Making of the American Party System 1789 to 1809 (1965), short excerpts from primary sources
- Cunningham, Noble E., Jr., ed. Circular Letters of Congressmen to Their Constituents 1789-1829 (1978), 3 vol; political reports sent by Congressmen to local newspapers
